= List of philosophers born in the 20th century =

Philosophers born in the 20th century (and others important in the history of philosophy) listed alphabetically:

Note: This list has a minimal criterion for inclusion and the relevance to philosophy of some individuals on the list is disputed.

== A ==
- Elisa Aaltola (born 1976)
- Richard Aaron (1901–1987)
- Gholamreza Aavani (born 1943)
- Nicola Abbagnano (1901–1990)
- Ruth Abbey (born 1961)
- Bijan Abdolkarimi (born 1963)
- Taha Abdurrahman (born 1944)
- Masao Abe (1915–2006)
- Henry D. Abelove (born 1945)
- Raziel Abelson (1921–2017)
- Miguel Abensour (1939–2017)
- Arash Abizadeh
- William Emmanuel Abraham (born 1934)
- David Abram (born 1957)
- Gerd B. Achenbach (born 1947)
- Peter Achinstein (born 1935)
- Hans Achterhuis (born 1942)
- Felicia Nimue Ackerman (born 1947)
- J. L. Ackrill (1921–2007)
- H. B. Acton (1908–1974)
- Carol J. Adams (born 1951)
- James Luther Adams (1901–1994)
- Marilyn McCord Adams (1943–2017)^{[b]}^{[c]}
- Maynard Adams (1919–2003)
- Robert Merrihew Adams (1937–2024)^{[b]}^{[c]}
- Peter Adamson (born 1972)
- Matthew Adler (born 1962)
- Mortimer J. Adler (1902–2001)
- Mantas Adomėnas (born 1972)
- Theodor Adorno (1903–1969)^{[a]}^{[b]}^{[c]}^{[d]}^{[e]}
- Sediq Afghan (born 1958)
- Michel Aflaq (1910–1989)
- Sylviane Agacinski (born 1945)
- Giorgio Agamben (born 1942)
- Joseph Agassi (1927–2023)
- Khurshid Ahmad (born 1932)
- Arif Ahmed
- Scott Aikin (born 1971)
- Timo Airaksinen (born 1947)
- Shabbir Akhtar (1960–2023)
- Lilli Alanen (1941–2021)
- David Albert (born 1954)
- Hans Albert (1921–2023)
- Rogers Albritton (1923–2002)
- Linda Martín Alcoff (born 1955)
- Virgil Aldrich (1903–1998)^{[b]}
- Gerda Alexander (1908–1994)
- Aleksandr Danilovich Aleksandrov (1912–1999)
- Robert Alexy (1945–2026)
- Keimpe Algra (born 1959)
- Lucy Allais
- George James Allan (born 1935)
- Trevor Allan (born 1955)
- Amy Allen
- Anita L. Allen (born 1953)
- Diogenes Allen (1932–2013)
- William B. Allen (born 1944)
- Henry E. Allison (1937–2023)
- Ferdinand Alquié (1906–1985)
- William Alston (1921–2009)^{[a]}^{[b]}^{[c]}
- Jimmy Altham (born 1944)
- Louis Althusser (1918–1990)^{[a]}^{[b]}^{[c]}^{[d]}
- Thomas J. J. Altizer (1927–2018)
- Alexander Altmann (1906–1987)
- Peter Alward (born 1964)
- Alice Ambrose (1906–2001)
- Karl Ameriks (born 1947)
- Roger T. Ames (born 1947)
- Günther Anders (1902–1992)
- Alan Ross Anderson (1925–1973)^{[b]}^{[c]}
- C. Anthony Anderson (born 1940)
- Elizabeth S. Anderson (born 1959)
- John Mueller Anderson (1914–1999)
- Pamela Sue Anderson (1955–2017)
- R. Lanier Anderson
- Judith Andre
- Kristin Andrews (born 1971)
- Antanas Andrijauskas (born 1948)
- Irving Anellis (1946–2013)
- Ian Angus (born 1949)
- Loreta Anilionytė
- Julia Annas (born 1946)
- G. E. M. Anscombe (1918–2001)^{[a]}^{[b]}^{[c]}^{[d]}
- Keith Ansell-Pearson (born 1960)
- Dario Antiseri (born 1940)
- Maria Rosa Antognazza (born 1964)
- John P. Anton (1920–2014)
- G. Aldo Antonelli (1962–2015)
- Louise Antony
- Karl-Otto Apel (1922–2017)
- Kwame Anthony Appiah (born 1954)
- Richard Appignanesi (born 1940)
- Richard E. Aquila (born 1944)
- Lennart Åqvist (born 1932)
- István Aranyosi (born 1975)
- Reza Davari Ardakani (born 1933)
- Hannah Arendt (1906–1975)^{[a]}^{[b]}^{[c]}^{[d]}^{[e]}
- Türker Armaner (born 1968)
- Leslie Armour (1931–2014)
- A. H. Armstrong (1909–1997)
- David Malet Armstrong (1926–2014)^{[a]}^{[b]}^{[c]}^{[d]}
- John Armstrong (born 1966)
- Juan Arnau (born 1968)
- Richard Arneson
- Rudolf Arnheim (1904–2007)
- Raymond Aron (1905–1983)
- Robert Arp (born 1970)
- Nomy Arpaly (born 1973)
- Robert Arrington (1938–2015)
- Kenneth Arrow (1921–2017)
- Zaki al-Arsuzi (1899–1968)
- Sergei N. Artemov (born 1951)
- John Arthur (1946–2007)
- Mariano Artigas (1938–2006)
- Adil Asadov (born 1958)
- Molefi Kete Asante (born 1942)
- Karl Aschenbrenner (1911–1988)
- Pandurang Shastri Athavale (1920–2003)
- Margaret Atherton (born 1943)
- George N. Atiyeh (1923–2008)
- Ronald Field Atkinson (1928–2005)
- Henri Atlan (born 1931)
- Syed Muhammad Naquib al-Attas (born 1931)
- Robin Attfield (born 1931)
- Elspeth Attwooll (born 1943)
- Gwenaëlle Aubry (born 1971)
- Robert Audi (born 1941)
- Lene Auestad (born 1973)
- John Langshaw Austin (1911–1960)^{[a]}^{[b]}^{[c]}^{[d]}
- Randall Auxier (born 1961)
- Armen Avanessian (born 1973)
- Jeremy Avigad (born 1968)
- Anita Avramides (born 1952)
- Kostas Axelos (1924–2010)
- Francisco J. Ayala (1934–2023)
- Alfred Jules Ayer (1910–1989)^{[a]}^{[b]}^{[c]}^{[d]}^{[e]}
- Michael R. Ayers (born 1935)
- Hiroki Azuma (born 1971)
- Joxe Azurmendi (born 1941)
- Jody Azzouni (born 1954)

== B ==
- Harriet Baber (born 1950)
- Babette Babich (born 1956)
- Rebeca Baceiredo (born 1979)
- Kent Bach (born 1943)
- Bronisław Baczko (1924–2016)
- Alain Badiou (born 1937)
- Julian Baggini (born 1968)
- Archie J. Bahm (1907–1996)
- Annette Baier (1929–2012)^{[b]}
- Kurt Baier (1917–2010)^{[b]}
- Moya Bailey
- Alan Baker
- Gordon Park Baker (1938–2002)
- Lynne Rudder Baker (1944–2017)
- Albena Bakratcheva (born 1961)
- Gopal Balakrishnan (born 1966)
- Tom Baldwin (born 1947)
- Étienne Balibar (born 1942)
- Renford Bambrough (1926–1999)
- Hassan al-Banna (1906–1949)
- Michael Banner (born 1961)
- Yehoshua Bar-Hillel (1915–1975)
- Dorit Bar-On (born 1955)
- Karen Barad (born 1956)
- Amiri Baraka (1934–2014)
- José Barata-Moura (born 1948)
- Renaud Barbaras (born 1955)
- Ian Barbour (1923–2013)
- Alejandro Bárcenas
- Sidi Mohamed Barkat (born 1948)
- Jason Barker (born 1971)
- Stephen F. Barker (1927–2019)
- Elizabeth Barnes
- Hazel Barnes (1915–2008)
- Jonathan Barnes (born 1942)^{[b]}^{[c]}
- Marcia Baron (born 1955)
- William Barrett (1913–1992)
- Eduardo Barrio
- Phillip Barron
- Brian Barry (1936–2009)^{[b]}^{[c]}
- Christian Barry
- Norman P. Barry (1944–2008)
- Roland Barthes (1915–1980)^{[a]}^{[c]}^{[d]}
- Lauren Swayne Barthold (born 1965)
- Sandra Bartky (1935–2016)
- Steven James Bartlett (born 1945)
- W. W. Bartley III (1934–1990)
- Renate Bartsch (born 1939)
- Shadi Bartsch (born 1966)
- Jon Barwise (1942–2000)
- Jacques Barzun (1907–2012)
- David Basinger (born 1947)
- Diderik Batens (born 1944)
- Gregory Bateson (1904–1980)
- David Batstone (born 1958)
- Jean Baudrillard (1929–2007)^{[c]}^{[d]}^{[e]}
- Nancy Bauer (born 1960)
- Zygmunt Bauman (1925–2017)
- Charles A. Baylis (1902–1975)
- Francoise Baylis (born 1961)
- Jc Beall (born 1966)
- Monroe Beardsley (1915–1985)
- Tom Beauchamp (born 1939)
- Jean Beaufret (1907–1982)
- Emily Beausoleil
- Simone de Beauvoir (1908–1986)^{[b]}^{[c]}^{[d]}^{[e]}
- Anthony Beavers (born 1963)
- William Bechtel (born 1951)
- Lewis White Beck (1913–1997)
- Gerhold K. Becker (born 1943)
- Lawrence C. Becker (1939–2018)
- Francis J. Beckwith (born 1960)
- Hugo Bedau (1926–2012)
- Mark Bedau (born 1950)
- Helen Beebee (born 1968)
- Hasna Begum (1935–2020)
- Ernst Behler (1928–1997)
- Werner Beierwaltes (1931–2019)
- Frederick C. Beiser (born 1949)
- Charles Beitz (born 1949)
- Daniel Bell (1919–2011)
- John Lane Bell (born 1945)
- Shannon Bell (born 1955)
- Robert N. Bellah (1927–2013)
- Kathryn Sophia Belle (born 1978)
- Nuel Belnap (born 1930)^{[b]}^{[c]}
- Yemima Ben-Menahem (born 1946)
- Aaron Ben-Ze'ev (born 1949)
- Paul Benacerraf (born 1931)
- Linos Benakis (born 1928)
- José Benardete (1928–2016)
- Seth Benardete (1930–2001)
- David Benatar (born 1966)
- Seyla Benhabib (born 1950)
- Piers Benn (born 1962)
- Jonathan Bennett (born 1930)^{[b]}^{[c]}
- Geoffrey Bennington (born 1956)
- Alain de Benoist (born 1943)
- Bruce Ellis Benson (born 1960)
- Sergio Benvenuto (born 1948)
- Floris van den Berg (born 1973)
- Peter L. Berger (1929–2017)
- Frithjof Bergmann (1930–2021)
- Gustav Bergmann (1906–1987)^{[a]}^{[b]}^{[c]}
- Michael Bergmann (born 1964)
- Lars Bergström
- Arnold Berleant (born 1932)
- Isaiah Berlin (1909–1997)^{[a]}^{[b]}^{[c]}^{[d]}^{[e]}
- Marshall Berman (1940–2013)
- José Benardete (1928–2016)
- Seth Benardete (1930–2001)
- Robert Bernasconi (born 1950)
- Walter Berns (1919–2015)
- Andrew Bernstein (born 1949)
- Jay Bernstein (born 1947)
- Mark H. Bernstein
- Richard J. Bernstein (born 1932)
- Marcus Berquist (1934–2010)
- Wendell Berry (born 1934)
- Ludwig von Bertalanffy (1901–1972)
- Peter Anthony Bertocci (1910–1989)
- Steven Best (born 1955)
- Gábor Betegh (born 1968)
- Richard Bett
- Mark Bevir (born 1963)
- Jean-Yves Béziau (born 1965)
- Homi K. Bhabha (born 1949)
- Roy Bhaskar (1944–2014)
- Nalini Bhushan
- Vladimir Bibikhin (1938–2004)
- Cristina Bicchieri (born 1950)
- Jacques Bidet (born 1935)
- Jean Biès (1933–2014)
- Simone Bignall
- Anat Biletzki (born 1952)
- Akeel Bilgrami (born 1950)
- Purushottama Bilimoria
- Nikola Biller-Andorno
- Katalin Bimbó (born 1963)
- Harry Binswanger (born 1944)
- Alexander Bird (born 1964)
- Garrett Birkhoff (1911–1996)
- Peg Birmingham
- Jeffrey Bishop (born 1967)
- Frode Alfson Bjørdal (born 1944)
- Max Black (1909–1988)^{[b]}^{[c]}
- Simon Blackburn (born 1944)^{[b]}^{[c]}
- Russell Blackford (born 1954)
- Oliva Blanchette (1929–2021)
- Patricia Blanchette
- Maurice Blanchot (1907–2003)^{[d]}
- Joseph Leon Blau (1909–1986)
- David Blitz
- Ned Block (born 1942)^{[b]}^{[c]}
- Allan Bloom (1930–1992)
- Lawrence Blum (born 1943)
- Albert Blumberg (1906–1997)
- Hans Blumenberg (1920–1996)
- Andy Blunden (born 1945)
- Norberto Bobbio (1909–2004)^{[b]}^{[c]}^{[d]}
- Chris Bobonich (born 1960)
- Susanne Bobzien (born 1960)
- Jozef Maria Bochenski (1902–1995)
- Remo Bodei (1938–2019)
- Margaret Boden (born 1936)
- James Bogen
- Paul Boghossian (born 1957)
- Peter Boghossian
- David Bohm (1917–1992)
- Gernot Böhme (born 1937)
- Hilary Bok (born 1959)
- Sissela Bok (born 1934)
- Alisa Bokulich
- Daniel Bonevac
- Dietrich Bonhoeffer (1906–1945)^{[c]}^{[d]}
- Laurence BonJour (born 1943)
- Murray Bookchin (1921–2006)
- George Boolos (1940–1996)
- William James Booth
- Susan Bordo
- Michael Bordt (born 1960)
- Emma Borg
- Albert Borgmann (born 1937)
- Eugene Borowitz (1924–2016)
- Giovanna Borradori
- Lisa Bortolotti (born 1974)
- David Bostock (1936–2019)
- Inga Bostad (born 1963)
- Nick Bostrom (born 1973)
- George Botterill (born 1949)
- Eileen Hunt Botting (born 1971)
- Alain de Botton (born 1969)
- Tina Fernandes Botts
- Pierre Bourdieu (1930–2002)^{[d]}
- Jacques Bouveresse (1940–2021)
- Luc Bovens
- David Frederick Bowers (1906–1945)
- Andrew Bowie (born 1952)
- Bernard Boxill
- Jan Boxill (born 1939)
- Richard Boyd (1942–2021)
- Joseph A. Bracken (born 1930)
- Costica Bradatan
- Richard Bradley (born 1964)
- Michael Brady (born 1965)
- Rémi Brague (born 1947)
- Rosi Braidotti (born 1954)
- David Braine (1940–2017)
- Richard-Bevan Braithwaite (1900–1990)^{[b]}^{[c]}
- Theodore Brameld (1904–1987)
- Myles Brand (1942–2009)
- Robert Brandom (born 1950)^{[b]}^{[c]}
- Richard B. Brandt (1910–1997)^{[a]}^{[b]}
- Eva Brann (born 1929)
- Ray Brassier (born 1965)
- Michael Bratman (born 1945)
- Stephen E. Braude (born 1945)
- David Braybrooke (1924–2013)
- Geoffrey Brennan (born 1944)
- Jason Brennan (born 1979)
- Samantha Brennan
- Teresa Brennan (1952–2003)
- Bill Brewer
- Jean Bricmont (born 1952)
- Ingo Brigandt
- Harry Brighouse
- Liam Kofi Bright
- David O. Brink (born 1958)
- Susan Brison
- Luc Brisson (born 1946)
- Charles Francis Brittain
- Alexander Broadie
- Sarah Broadie (1941–2021)
- Dan W. Brock (1937–2020)
- May Brodbeck (1917–1983)
- Berit Brogaard (born 1970)
- Johannes Bronkhorst (born 1946)
- Stephen Bronner (born 1949)
- Thom Brooks (born 1973)
- John Broome (born 1947)
- Janet Broughton
- Harvey Brown (born 1950)
- Wendy Brown (born 1955)
- Kimberley Brownlee (born 1978)
- Bartosz Brożek (born 1977)
- Pascal Bruckner (born 1948)
- Robert Brumbaugh (1918–1992)
- Fernand Brunner (1920–1991)
- Brian Bruya (born 1966)
- Edwin Bryant (born 1957)
- Levi Bryant
- Jeffrey Bub (born 1942)
- Allen Buchanan (born 1948)
- Ian Buchanan (born 1969)
- James M. Buchanan (1919–2013)
- Gerd Buchdahl (1914–2001)
- Justus Buchler (1914–1991)
- Henry Bugbee (1915–1999)
- Mario Bunge (1919–2020)
- Martin Bunzl (born 1948)
- Tyler Burge (born 1946)^{[b]}^{[c]}
- Ronna Burger (born 1947)
- J. Peter Burgess (born 1961)
- John P. Burgess (born 1948)
- Teresa Blankmeyer Burke
- Arthur Burks (1915–2008)
- James Burnham (1905–1987)
- John Burnheim (1927–2023)
- Elizabeth Burns
- Myles Burnyeat (1939–2019)^{[b]}^{[c]}
- David Burrell (born 1933)
- Roderick D. Bush (1945–2013)
- Panayot Butchvarov (born 1933)
- Judith Butler (born 1956)
- Jeremy Butterfield (born 1954)
- Victor L. Butterfield (1904–1975)
- Stephen Butterfill
- Charles Butterworth (born 1938)

== C ==
- Amílcar Cabral (1924–1973)^{[d]}
- Julio Cabrera
- Massimo Cacciari (born 1944)
- John Cage (1912–1992)
- Cheshire Calhoun
- Daniel Callahan (1930–2019)
- Joan Callahan (1946–2019)
- Agnes Callard (born 1976)
- Craig Callender (born 1968)
- J. Baird Callicott (born 1941)
- Elisabeth Camp
- Donald T. Campbell (1916–1996)
- John Campbell (born 1956)^{[b]}^{[c]}
- Joseph Campbell (1904–1987)
- Victoria Camps (born 1941)
- Albert Camus (1913–1960)^{[a]}^{[b]}^{[c]}^{[d]}
- Georges Canguilhem (1904–1995)^{[a]}
- Leslie Cannold
- Monique Canto-Sperber (born 1954)
- Milič Čapek (1909–1997)
- Herman Cappelen (born 1967)
- John D. Caputo (born 1940)
- Josiah S. Carberry (born 1929)
- Claudia Card (1940–2015)
- Taylor Carman (born 1965)
- Walter Carnielli (born 1952)
- Eduardo Carrasco (born 1940)
- Peter Carravetta (born 1951)
- Peter Carruthers (born 1952)
- Arturo Carsetti (born 1940)
- Rachel Carson (1907–1964)
- Alan Carter (born 1952)
- Nancy Cartwright (born 1944)^{[b]}^{[c]}
- Richard Cartwright (1925–2010)
- Olavo de Carvalho (1947–2022)
- Edward S. Casey (born 1939)
- Quassim Cassam (born 1961)
- Barbara Cassin (born 1947)
- Pierre Cassou-Noguès (born 1971)
- Hector-Neri Castañeda (1924–1991)^{[a]}
- Roberto Castillo (1950–2008)
- David Castle (born 1967)
- Cornelius Castoriadis (1922–1997)
- Jean Cavaillès (1903–1944)
- Paola Cavalieri (born 1950)
- Stanley Cavell (1926–2018)^{[a]}^{[b]}^{[c]}^{[d]}
- Christopher Celenza (born 1967)
- Michel de Certeau (1925–1986)^{[d]}
- Arindam Chakrabarti
- Anjan Chakravartty
- Alan Chalmers (born 1939)
- David Chalmers (born 1966)^{[c]}
- Clare Chambers (born 1976)
- Timothy Chambers
- Wing-tsit Chan (1901–1994)
- Hasok Chang (born 1967)
- Ruth Chang
- Vere Claiborne Chappell (1930–2019)
- David Charles
- Debiprasad Chattopadhyaya (1918–1993)
- Haridas Chaudhuri (1913–1975)
- Albert Chernenko (1935–2009)
- Harold F. Cherniss (1904–1987)
- Mark Cherry
- Ronda Chervin (born 1937)
- Charles Chihara (1932–2020)
- James Childress (born 1940)
- Roderick Chisholm (1916–1999)^{[a]}^{[b]}^{[c]}^{[d]}
- William Chittick (born 1943)
- Kah Kyung Cho (born 1927)
- Pema Chödrön (born 1936)
- Noam Chomsky (born 1928)^{[a]}^{[b]}^{[c]}^{[d]}
- Alonzo Church (1903–1995)^{[a]}^{[b]}^{[c]}^{[d]}
- Patricia Churchland (born 1943)^{[a]}
- Paul Churchland (born 1942)^{[a]}^{[b]}^{[c]}
- C. West Churchman (1913–2004)
- Frank Cioffi (1928–2012)
- Emil Cioran (1911–1995)
- Joanne B. Ciulla (born 1952)
- Hélène Cixous (born 1937)^{[d]}
- Jean Clam (born 1958)
- Andy Clark (born 1957)
- Gordon Clark (1902–1985)
- Stephen R. L. Clark (born 1945)
- Desmond Clarke (1942–2016)
- W. Norris Clarke (1915–2008)
- Carol Cleland (born 1948)
- Justin Clemens (born 1969)
- Catherine Clément (born 1939)
- Forrest Clingerman (1972–2024)
- Paul Cliteur (born 1955)
- Sharyn Clough (born 1965)
- C. A. J. Coady (born 1936)
- John B. Cobb (1925–2024)
- David Cockburn (born 1949)
- Alan Code (born 1951)
- Lorraine Code (born 1937)
- Felix S. Cohen (1907–1953)
- Gerald Cohen (1941–2009)^{[b]}^{[c]}
- Joshua Cohen (born 1951)
- L. Jonathan Cohen (1923–2006)^{[b]}^{[c]}
- Selma Jeanne Cohen (1920–2005)
- Priscilla Cohn (1933–2019)
- David R. Cole (born 1967)
- Jules Coleman (born 1947)
- Lucio Colletti (1924–2001)^{[b]}^{[c]}
- Patricia Hill Collins (born 1948)
- Robin Collins
- Mark Colyvan
- John Joseph Compton (1928–2014)
- André Comte-Sponville (born 1952)
- Marcel Conche (born 1922)
- James H. Cone (1938–2018)
- Deborah Cook (1954–2020)
- Joyce Mitchell Cook (1933–2014)
- Ursula Coope (born 1969)
- David E. Cooper (born 1942)
- John M. Cooper (born 1939)
- Rachel Cooper (born 1974)
- Jack Copeland (born 1950)
- Brian Copenhaver (born 1942)
- Irving Copi (1917–2002)
- Joan Copjec
- Frederick Copleston (1907–1994)
- Henry Corbin (1903–1978)
- John Corcoran (1937–2021)
- Viola Cordova (1937–2002)
- Carla Cordua (born 1925)
- David Corfield
- Drucilla Cornell (born 1950)
- Newton da Costa (born 1929)
- John Cottingham (born 1943)
- William Craig (1918–2016)
- William Lane Craig (born 1949)
- Tim Crane (born 1962)
- Alice Crary (born 1967)
- Robert P. Crease (born 1953)
- Richard Creath (born 1947)
- Max Cresswell (born 1939)
- Roger Crisp (born 1961)
- Simon Critchley (born 1960)
- Helena Cronin (born 1942)
- Robert Craigie Cross (1911–2000)
- Richard Crossman (1907–1974)
- Antonio Cua (1932–2007)
- Ann Cudd
- Garrett Cullity
- Robert Denoon Cumming (1916–2004)
- Chris Cuomo
- Don Cupitt (born 1934)
- Tommy J. Curry
- Jean Curthoys (born 1947)
- James T. Cushing (1937–2002)

== D ==
- François Dagognet (1924–2015)
- Robert Dahl (1915–2014)
- Daniel O. Dahlstrom (born 1948)
- Mary Daly (1928–2010)
- Jonathan Dancy (born 1946)
- Norm Daniels (born 1942)
- Arthur Danto (1924–2013)^{[a]}^{[b]}^{[c]}
- Lindley Darden (born 1945)
- Stephen Darwall (born 1946)
- Arnold Davidson (born 1955)
- Donald Davidson (1917–2003)^{[a]}^{[b]}^{[c]}^{[d]}^{[e]}
- Brian Davies (born 1951)
- Martin Davies (born 1950)
- Stephen Davies
- Angela Davis (born 1944)
- Diane Davis (born 1963)
- Michael Davis (born 1943)
- Guy Debord (1931–1994)
- Vianney Décarie (1917–2009)
- Mario De Caro (born 1963)
- Helen De Cruz (born 1978)
- John Deely (1942–2017)
- Maximilian de Gaynesford (born 1968)
- Richard T. De George (born 1933)
- John J. DeGioia (born 1957)
- David DeGrazia (born 1962)
- Charles De Koninck (1906–1965)
- Manuel DeLanda (born 1952)
- Gilles Deleuze (1925–1995)^{[b]}^{[c]}^{[d]}^{[e]}
- Bernard Delfgaauw (1912–1993)
- Paul de Man (1919–1983)^{[d]}
- Lara Denis (born 1969)
- Daniel Dennett (1942–2024)^{[a]}^{[b]}^{[c]}^{[d]}
- Douglas Den Uyl (born 1950)
- Keith DeRose (born 1962)
- Jacques Derrida (1930–2004)^{[a]}^{[b]}^{[c]}^{[d]}^{[e]}
- Giorgio de Santillana (1902–1974)
- Peggy DesAutels
- Vincent Descombes (born 1943)
- Ronald de Sousa (born 1940)
- Michael Detlefsen (1948–2019)
- Eliot Deutsch (1931–2020)
- Karl Deutsch (1912–1992)
- Penelope Deutscher
- Philippe Devaux (1902–1979)
- Michael Devitt (born 1938)
- Hent de Vries (born 1958)
- L. Harold DeWolf (1905–1986)
- Meena Dhanda
- Cora Diamond (born 1937)
- Donna Dickenson (born 1946)
- George Dickie (1926–2020)
- Michael R. Dietrich (born 1963)
- Susan Ann Dimock
- Zoran Đinđić (1952–2003)
- Rosalyn Diprose
- Do-ol (born 1948)
- Daniel Dombrowski (born 1953)
- Alan Donagan (1925–1991)
- Sue Donaldson (born 1962)
- Keith Donnellan (1931–2015)
- Josephine Donovan (born 1941)
- Mark Dooley (born 1970)
- Jude Patrick Dougherty (1930–2021)
- James Doull (1918-2001)
- Igor Douven
- Bradley Dowden (born 1942)
- Lisa Downing (born 1974)
- Paul Draper (born 1957)
- William Herbert Dray (1921–2009)
- Burton Dreben (1927–1999)
- Fred Dretske (1932–2013)^{[a]}^{[b]}^{[c]}
- James Drever (1910–1991)
- Hubert Dreyfus (1929–2017)
- Julia Driver
- Shadia Drury (born 1950)
- Dominique Dubarle (1907–1987)
- Aleksandr Dugin (born 1962)
- Michael Dummett (1925–2011)^{[a]}^{[b]}^{[c]}^{[d]}
- Fernand Dumont (1927–1997)
- Raya Dunayevskaya (1910–1987)
- Jon Michael Dunn (1941–2021)
- John Dupré (born 1952)
- Louis Dupré (born 1925)
- Denis Dutton (1944–2010)
- Divya Dwivedi
- Gerald Dworkin (born 1937)
- Ronald Dworkin (1931–2013)^{[a]}^{[b]}^{[c]}^{[d]}
- Davor Džalto (born 1980)
- Miroslaw Dzielski (1941–1989)

== E ==
- William A. Earle (1919–1988)
- John Earman (born 1942)^{[c]}
- Kenny Easwaran
- John Eccles (1903–1997)
- Umberto Eco (1932–2016)^{[a]}
- Abraham Edel (1908–2007)
- Gerald Edelman (1929–2014)
- Dorothy Edgington (born 1941)
- James M. Edie (1927–1998)
- Lez Edmond
- David Edmonds (born 1964)
- Paul Edwards (1923–2004)^{[b]}^{[c]}
- Frances Egan
- Margaret Elizabeth Egan (1905–1959)
- Carolyn Eisele (1902–2000)
- Alexandra Elbakyan (born 1988)
- Mircea Eliade (1907–1986)^{[d]}
- Ignacio Ellacuría (1930–1989)
- Carl Elliott (born 1961)
- Deni Elliott
- Brian David Ellis (1929–2025)
- Jacques Ellul (1912–1994)
- Jean Bethke Elshtain (1941–2013)
- Jon Elster (born 1940)^{[b]}^{[c]}
- Charles R. Embry
- Dorothy Emmet (1904–2000)
- Pascal Engel (born 1954)
- David Enoch
- Erik Erikson (1902–1994)
- John Etchemendy (born 1952)
- Amitai Etzioni (born 1929)
- Jin Eun-young (born 1970)
- C. Stephen Evans (born 1948)
- Gareth Evans (1946–1980)^{[b]}^{[c]}^{[d]}
- Stanley Eveling (1925–2008)
- Nir Eyal (born 1970)
- Emmanuel Chukwudi Eze (1963–2007)

== F ==
- Cécile Fabre (born 1971)
- Emil Fackenheim (1916–2003)^{[d]}^{[e]}
- Anne Fagot-Largeault (born 1938)
- Frantz Fanon (1925–1961)^{[b]}^{[c]}^{[d]}
- Delia Graff Fara (1969–2017)
- Marvin Farber (1901–1980)
- Catia Faria (born 1980)
- Austin Marsden Farrer (1904–1968)^{[d]}
- James E. Faulconer (born 1947)
- Joanne Faulkner (born 1972)
- Keith W. Faulkner
- Silvia Federici (born 1942)
- Andrew Feenberg (born 1943)
- Solomon Feferman (1928–2016)
- Carla Fehr
- Herbert Feigl (1902–1988)
- Joel Feinberg (1926–2004)^{[b]}^{[c]}
- Fred Feldman (born 1941)
- Ann Ferguson (born 1938)
- Maurizio Ferraris (born 1956)
- José Ferrater Mora (1912–1991)^{[b]}^{[c]}
- Frederick Ferré (1933–2013)
- Luc Ferry (born 1951)
- Paul Feyerabend (1924–1994)^{[b]}^{[c]}^{[d]}^{[e]}
- Hartry Field (born 1946)^{[b]}^{[c]}
- James Fieser
- Carrie Figdor
- J. N. Findlay (1903–1987)
- Arthur Fine (born 1937)
- Gail Fine
- Kit Fine (born 1946)^{[b]}^{[c]}
- Martha Albertson Fineman (born 1943)
- Bruno de Finetti (1906–1985)^{[b]}^{[c]}
- Herbert Fingarette (1921–2018)
- Eugen Fink (1905–1975)
- John Finnis (born 1940)^{[b]}^{[c]}
- Lawrence Finsen
- Susan Finsen
- Roderick Firth (1917–1987)
- John Martin Fischer (born 1952)
- Frederic Fitch (1908–1987)
- Branden Fitelson (born 1969)
- Owen Flanagan (born 1940)
- Kurt Flasch (born 1930)
- Richard E. Flathman (1934–2015)
- Joseph Fletcher (1905–1991)
- Antony Flew (1923–2010)
- Katrin Flikschuh
- Luciano Floridi (born 1964)
- Elizabeth Flower (1914–1995)
- Juliet Floyd
- Vilém Flusser (1920–1991)
- James R. Flynn (1934–2020)
- Thomas R. Flynn (born 1936)
- Jerry Fodor (1935–2017)^{[a]}^{[b]}^{[c]}^{[d]}^{[f]}
- Robert Fogelin (1932–2016)
- Dagfinn Føllesdal (born 1932)^{[b]}^{[c]}
- William Fontaine (1909–1968)
- Élisabeth de Fontenay (born 1934)
- Philippa Foot (1920–2010)^{[a]}^{[b]}^{[c]}
- Graeme R. Forbes
- Peter Forrest (born 1948)
- John Forrester (1949–2015)
- Rainer Forst (born 1964)
- Michel Foucault (1926–1984)^{[a]}^{[b]}^{[c]}^{[d]}^{[e]}^{[f]}
- Bas van Fraassen (born 1941)
- Carlos Fraenkel (born 1971)
- Gary L. Francione (born 1954)
- Leslie Francis
- Manfred Frank (born 1945)
- Charles Frankel (1917–1979)
- William K. Frankena (1908–1994)^{[a]}^{[b]}^{[c]}
- Nancy Frankenberry (born 1947)
- Harry Frankfurt (born 1929)^{[b]}^{[c]}
- Keith Frankish
- Viktor Frankl (1905–1997)
- James Franklin (born 1953)
- Oliver Shewell Franks (1905–1992)
- Nancy Fraser (born 1947)
- Michael Frede (1940–2007)^{[b]}^{[c]}
- Hans Wilhelm Frei (1922–1988)^{[d]}
- Paulo Freire
- Anne Fremantle (1909–2002)
- Peter A. French (born 1942)
- Raymond Frey (1941–2012)
- Miranda Fricker (born 1966)
- Marilyn Friedman (born 1945)
- Michael Friedman (born 1947)
- Milton Friedman (1912–2006)
- Roman Frigg (born 1972)
- Robert Frodeman
- Erich Fromm (1900–1980)
- Risieri Frondizi (1910–1983)
- Marilyn Frye (born 1941)
- Northrop Frye (1912–1991)
- Lon L. Fuller (1902–1978)^{[d]}
- Christopher Fynsk (born 1952)

== G ==
- Dov Gabbay (born 1945)
- Hans-Georg Gadamer (1900–2002)^{[a]}^{[b]}^{[c]}^{[d]}^{[e]}
- Raimond Gaita (born 1946)
- John Kenneth Galbraith (1908–2006)
- Peter Galison (born 1955)
- Shaun Gallagher (born 1948)
- W. B. Gallie (1912–1998)
- Jonardon Ganeri
- Pieranna Garavaso
- Daniel Garber (born 1949)
- Patrick Gardiner (1922–1997)
- John Gardner (1965–2019)
- Jay L. Garfield (born 1955)
- Ann Garry
- Richard Gaskin (born 1960)
- William H. Gass (1924–2017)
- Moira Gatens (born 1954)
- Christopher Gauker
- Stephen Gaukroger (born 1950)
- Gerald Gaus (1952–2020)
- David Gauthier (born 1932)^{[b]}^{[c]}
- Peter Geach (1916–2013)^{[a]}^{[b]}^{[c]}
- Clifford Geertz (1926–2006)
- Arnold Gehlen (1904–1976)
- Ernest Gellner (1925–1995)
- Ken Gemes
- Tamar Gendler (born 1965)
- Eugene Gendlin (1926–2017)
- Gerhard Gentzen (1909–1945)^{[b]}^{[c]}^{[d]}
- Alexander George
- Robert P. George (born 1955)
- Volker Gerhardt (born 1944)
- Lloyd P. Gerson (born 1948)
- Bernard Gert (1934–2011)
- Edmund Gettier (1927–2021)^{[b]}^{[c]}
- Raymond Geuss (born 1946)
- Alan Gewirth (1912–2004)^{[b]}^{[c]}
- Rashid al-Ghannushi (born 1941)
- Michael Ghiselin (born 1939)
- Allan Gibbard (born 1942)^{[b]}^{[c]}
- James J. Gibson (1904–1979)
- Roger Gibson (1944–2015)
- Margaret Gilbert (born 1942)
- Langdon Gilkey (1919–2004)
- Mary Louise Gill
- Michael Allen Gillespie (born 1951)
- Donald A. Gillies (born 1944)
- Carol Gilligan (born 1936)
- Neil Gillman (1933–2017)
- Carl Ginet (born 1932)
- Hannah Ginsborg
- René Girard (1923–2015)
- Valéry Giroux (born 1974)
- Kristin Gjesdal
- Michael Glanzberg
- Ernst von Glasersfeld (1917–2010)
- Simon Glendinning (born 1964)
- Hans-Johann Glock (born 1960)
- Jonathan Glover (born 1941)^{[b]}^{[c]}
- Clark Glymour (born 1942)
- Paul Gochet (1932–2011)
- Kurt Gödel (1906–1978)^{[b]}^{[c]}^{[d]}
- Peter Godfrey-Smith (born 1965)
- Lydia Goehr (born 1960)
- Philip Goff
- Erving Goffman (1922–1982)
- Warren Goldfarb (born 1949)
- Peter Goldie (1946–2011)
- Alvin Goldman (born 1938)^{[a]}^{[b]}^{[c]}
- Lucien Goldmann (1913–1970)
- Victor Goldschmidt (1914–1981)
- Bernard R. Goldstein (born 1938)
- Rebecca Goldstein (born 1950)
- Dan Goldstick
- Cornelius Golightly (1917–1976)
- Jacob Golomb
- Nicolás Gómez Dávila (1913–1994)
- Alfonso Gómez-Lobo (1940–2011)
- Ana Marta González (born 1969)
- Robert E. Goodin (born 1950)
- Robert Gooding-Williams (born 1953)
- Nelson Goodman (1906–1998)^{[a]}^{[b]}^{[c]}^{[d]}
- Paul Goodman (1911–1972)
- Alison Gopnik (born 1955)
- Lewis Gordon (born 1962)
- André Gorz (1923–2007)
- Paul Gottfried (born 1941)
- Allan Gotthelf (1942–2013)
- Anthony Gottlieb (born 1956)
- T. A. Goudge (1910–1999)
- Alvin Gouldner (1920–1980)
- Trudy Govier (born 1944)
- Jorge J. E. Gracia (1942–2021)
- James Allen Graff (1937–2005)
- L. Gordon Graham (born 1949)
- Gérard Granel (1930–2000)
- Gilles-Gaston Granger (1920–2016)
- George Grant (1918–1988)
- Ivor Grattan-Guinness (1941–2014)
- Jesse Glenn Gray (1913–1977)
- John Gray (born 1948)
- A. C. Grayling (born 1949)
- Hilary Greaves (born 1978)
- John Greco
- Celia Green (born 1935)
- Karen Green
- Leslie Green (born 1956)
- Clement Greenberg (1909–1994)
- Maxine Greene (1917–2014)
- Patricia Greenspan
- Mary J. Gregor (1928–1994)
- Marjorie Grene (1910–2009)
- Herbert Paul Grice (1913–1988)^{[a]}^{[b]}^{[c]}^{[d]}^{[e]}
- David Ray Griffin (born 1939)
- James Griffin (1933–2019)
- Allen Phillips Griffiths (1927–2014)
- Paul E. Griffiths (born 1962)
- Patrick Grim
- Germain Grisez (1929–2018)^{[b]}
- Jeroen Groenendijk (born 1949)
- Elizabeth Grosz (born 1952)
- Lori Gruen
- Adolf Grünbaum (1923–2018)^{[b]}^{[c]}
- Cynthia M. Grund (born 1956)
- Félix Guattari (1930–1992)
- Lisa Guenther
- María José Guerra Palmero (born 1962)
- Charles Guignon (1944–2020)
- Hans Ulrich Gumbrecht (born 1948)
- Gotthard Günther (1900–1984)
- Anil Gupta (born 1949)
- Aron Gurwitsch (1901–1973)
- David P. Gushee
- W. K. C. Guthrie (1906–1981)
- Samuel Guttenplan (born 1944)
- Gary Gutting (1942–2019)
- Paul Guyer (born 1948)
- Abimael Guzmán (1934–2021)
- Kwame Gyekye (1939–2019)

== H ==
- Susan Haack (born 1945)
- Jürgen Habermas (1929–2026)^{[a]}^{[b]}^{[c]}^{[d]}^{[e]}^{[f]}
- Peter Hacker (born 1939)
- Ian Hacking (born 1936)^{[b]}^{[c]}
- John Hadley (born 1966)
- Ilsetraut Hadot (born 1928)
- Pierre Hadot (1922–2010)
- Ruth Hagengruber
- Simon Hailwood
- Volker Halbach (born 1965)
- John Haldane (born 1954)
- Bob Hale (1945–2017)
- Edward J. Hall
- Everett Hall (1901–1960)
- Manly Palmer Hall (1901–1990)
- Philip Hallie (1922–1994)
- Joseph Halpern (born 1953)
- Clive Hamilton (born 1953)
- Stuart Hampshire (1914–2004)^{[b]}^{[c]}
- Jean Elizabeth Hampton (1954–1996)
- Byung-Chul Han (born 1959)
- Gila Hanna
- Alastair Hannay (born 1932)^{[b]}^{[c]}
- Norwood Russell Hanson (1922–1967)^{[d]}
- Sven Ove Hansson (born 1951)
- Donna Haraway (born 1944)
- Garrett Hardin (1915–2003)
- Russell Hardin (1940–2017)
- Sandra Harding (born 1935)
- Michael Hardt (born 1960)
- John E. Hare (born 1949)
- R. M. Hare (1919–2002)^{[a]}^{[b]}^{[c]}^{[d]}
- Elizabeth Harman
- Gilbert Harman (1938–2021)^{[b]}^{[c]}
- Graham Harman (born 1968)
- Rom Harré (1927–2019)
- Karsten Harries (born 1937)
- Michael Harrington (1928–1989)
- Errol Harris (1908–2009)
- John Harris (born 1945)
- Leonard Harris
- Sam Harris (born 1967)
- Tristan Harris (born 1984)
- Zellig Harris (1909–1992)
- John Harsanyi (1920–2000)
- H. L. A. Hart (1907–1992)^{[a]}^{[b]}^{[c]}^{[d]}
- David Bentley Hart (born 1965)
- Verity Harte
- David Hartman (1931–2013)
- Robert S. Hartman (1910–1973)
- Stephan Hartmann (born 1968)
- Nancy Hartsock (1943–2015)
- Van A. Harvey (1923–2021)
- Sally Haslanger
- Gary Hatfield
- Stanley Hauerwas (born 1940)
- John Haugeland (1945–2010)
- Daniel M. Hausman (born 1947)
- David Hawkins (1913–2002)
- Katherine Hawley (1971–2021)
- John Hawthorne (born 1964)
- Matti Häyry (born 1956)
- Jane Heal (born 1946)
- Donald O. Hebb (1904–1985)
- Jennifer Michael Hecht (born 1965)
- Patrick Aidan Heelan (1926–2015)
- Martin Heidegger (1889-1976)
- John Heil (born 1943)
- Klaus Heinrich (1927–2020)
- Werner Heisenberg (1901–1976)^{[b]}^{[c]}^{[d]}
- Virginia Held (born 1929)
- Ágnes Heller (1929–2019)
- Erich Heller (1911–1990)
- Michał Heller (born 1936)
- Futa Helu (1934–2010)
- Carl Gustav Hempel (1905–1997)^{[a]}^{[b]}^{[c]}^{[d]}
- Leon Henkin (1921–2006)
- Robert J. Henle (1909–2000)
- Dieter Henrich (1927–2022)
- Michel Henry (1922–2002)
- Will Herberg (1901–1977)
- Barbara Herman (born 1945)
- Jeanne Hersch (1910–2000)
- Abraham Joshua Heschel (1907–1972)^{[d]}
- Mary Hesse (1924–2016)
- John Hick (1922–2012)^{[b]}
- Stephen Hicks (born 1960)
- Pamela Hieronymi
- Alice von Hildebrand (born 1923)
- Christopher S. Hill (born 1942)
- Claire Ortiz Hill (born 1951)
- Alison Hills
- Jaakko Hintikka (1929–2015)^{[a]}^{[b]}^{[c]}
- Christopher Hitchens (1949–2011)
- Sarah Hoagland (born 1945)
- Angie Hobbs (born 1961)
- Richard Hocking (1906–2001)
- Eric Hoffer (1902–1983)
- Albert Hofstadter (1910–1989)
- Martin Hollis (1938–1998)
- Richard Holton
- Ted Honderich (born 1933)^{[c]}
- Axel Honneth (born 1949)
- Sidney Hook (1902–1989)^{[b]}^{[c]}
- Brad Hooker (born 1957)
- bell hooks (1952–2021)
- Jennifer Hornsby (born 1951)^{[b]}^{[c]}
- Tamara Horowitz (1950–2000)
- Oscar Horta (born 1974)
- Paul Horwich (born 1947)^{[b]}^{[c]}
- John Hospers (1918–2011)
- Paulin J. Hountondji (born 1942)
- George Hourani (1913–1984)
- Colin Howson (1945–2020)
- Hsu Fu-kuan (1903–1982)^{[a]}
- Michael Huemer (born 1969)
- Fiona Hughes
- George Edward Hughes (1918–1994)
- David Hull (1935–2010)
- Paul Humphreys
- Thomas Hurka (born 1952)
- Susan Hurley (1954–2007)
- Rosalind Hursthouse (born 1943)
- Douglas Husak (born 1948)
- Robert Maynard Hutchins (1899–1977)
- John Hyman (born 1960)
- Jean Hyppolite (1907–1968)

== I ==
- Don Ihde (born 1934)
- Ivan Illich (1926–2002)
- Evald Vassilievich Ilyenkov (1924–1979)^{[d]}
- Claude Imbert (born 1933)
- Bernard Ryosuke Inagaki (born 1928)
- Peter van Inwagen (born 1942)
- Michael Inwood (1944–2021)
- Luce Irigaray (born 1930)^{[a]}^{[b]}^{[c]}^{[d]}
- Terence Irwin (born 1947)^{[b]}^{[c]}
- William Irwin (born 1970)
- Jenann Ismael
- Veronica Ivy (born 1982)

== J ==
- Frank Jackson (born 1943)^{[b]}^{[c]}
- Jane Jacobs (1916–2006)
- Rahel Jaeggi (born 1967)
- Harry V. Jaffa (1918–2015)
- Alison Jaggar (born 1942)
- Pankaj Jain (born 1970)
- Joy James (born 1958)
- Susan James (born 1951)
- Fredric Jameson (born 1934)
- Dale Jamieson (born 1947)
- Christopher Janaway
- Erich Jantsch (1929–1980)
- Grace Jantzen (1948–2006)
- Nick Jardine (born 1943)
- Katarzyna Jaszczolt (born 1963)
- David Lyle Jeffrey
- Richard C. Jeffrey (1926–2002)^{[b]}^{[c]}
- Carrie Ichikawa Jenkins
- Fiona Jenkins (born 1965)
- Hans Joas (born 1948)
- Alejandro Jodorowsky (born 1929)
- Kyle Johannsen
- Stephen D. John (born 1979)
- Barbara Johnson (1947–2009)
- Galen Johnson (born 1948)
- Adrian Johnston
- Mark Johnston
- Hans Jonas (1903–1993)
- Dorthe Jørgensen (born 1959)

== K ==
- Shelly Kagan (born 1954)^{[c]}
- Charles H. Kahn (born 1928)
- Daniel Kahneman (born 1934)
- Frances Kamm
- Hans Kamp (born 1940)
- Robert Kane (born 1938)
- Abraham Kaplan (1918–1993)
- David Kaplan (born 1933)^{[b]}^{[c]}
- Barrie Karp (1945–2019)
- Carol Karp (1926–1972)
- Jerrold Katz (1932–2002)
- Gordon D. Kaufman (1925–2011)
- Walter Kaufmann (1921–1980)
- Richard Kearney (born 1954)
- Evelyn Fox Keller (born 1936)
- David Kelley (born 1949)
- Sean Dorrance Kelly
- John G. Kemeny (1926–1992)
- Andreas Kemmerling (born 1950)
- Willmoore Kendall (1909–1967)
- Duncan Kennedy (born 1942)
- Anthony Kenny (born 1931)^{[b]}^{[c]}
- Joseph Kerman (1924–2014)
- Serene Khader
- Ranjana Khanna
- Mahmoud Khatami
- Kim Hyung-suk (born 1920)
- Jaegwon Kim (1934–2019)^{[a]}^{[b]}^{[c]}
- Martin Luther King Jr. (1929–1968)
- Elselijn Kingma (born 1981)
- Mark Kingwell (born 1963)
- Robert Kirk (born 1933)
- Richard Kirkham (born 1955)
- Elizabeth Kiss (born 1961)
- Patricia Kitcher (born 1948)
- Philip Kitcher (born 1947)^{[c]}
- Eva Kittay
- Peter Kivy (1934–2017)
- Stephen Cole Kleene (1909–1994)
- Martha Klein
- Peter D. Klein (born 1940)
- Ursula Klein (born 1952)
- Raymond Klibansky (1905–2005)
- George Kline (1921–2014)
- Brian Klug
- Martha Kneale (1909–2001)
- William Calvert Kneale (1906–1990)^{[b]}^{[c]}
- David M. Knight (1936–2018)
- Sue Knight
- Joshua Knobe (born 1974)
- Wilbur Knorr (1945–1997)
- Dudley Knowles (1947–2014)
- Adrienne Koch (1913–1971)
- Hans Köchler (born 1948)
- Joseph J. Kockelmans (born 1923)
- Peter Koellner
- Noretta Koertge
- Arthur Koestler (1905–1983)
- Sarah Kofman (1934–1994)
- Erazim Kohák (1933–2020)
- Lawrence Kohlberg (1927–1987)
- Alexandre Kojève (1902–1968)^{[d]}
- Leszek Kolakowski (1927–2009)
- Katerina Kolozova (born 1969)
- Milan Komar (1921–2006)
- Charles De Koninck (1906–1965)
- Milton R. Konvitz (1908–2003)
- Robert C. Koons
- Mario Kopić (born 1965)
- Włodzimierz Julian Korab-Karpowicz (born 1953)
- Hilary Kornblith
- Stephan Körner (1913–2000)
- Christine Korsgaard (born 1952)^{[c]}
- Carolyn Korsmeyer (born 1950)
- Kathrin Koslicki
- Matthew Kramer (born 1959)
- Otto Kraushaar (1901–1989)
- Michael Krausz (1942–2025)
- Richard Kraut (born 1944)
- Peter Kreeft (born 1937)
- Georg Kreisel (1923–2015)^{[b]}^{[c]}
- David Farrell Krell (born 1944)
- Michael Kremer
- Norman Kretzmann (1928–1998)
- Saul Kripke (1940–2022)^{[b]}^{[c]}
- Paul Oskar Kristeller (1905–1999)
- Julia Kristeva (born 1941)^{[a]}^{[b]}^{[c]}^{[d]}
- Irving Kristol (1920–2009)
- Erik von Kuehnelt-Leddihn (1909–1999)
- Thomas Samuel Kuhn (1922–1996)^{[a]}^{[b]}^{[c]}^{[d]}^{[e]}^{[f]}
- Helga Kuhse
- Quill Kukla
- Bruce Kuklick (born 1941)
- Kalevi Kull (born 1952)
- İoanna Kuçuradi (born 1936)
- Joel J. Kupperman (1936–2020)
- Paul Kurtz (1925–2012)
- Jonathan Kvanvig (born 1954)
- Henry E. Kyburg Jr. (1928–2007)
- Will Kymlicka (born 1962)

== L ==
- Jacques Lacan (1901–1981)^{[a]}^{[b]}^{[c]}^{[d]}^{[e]}
- John Lachs (1934–2023)
- Jennifer Lackey
- Philippe Lacoue-Labarthe (1940–2007)^{[d]}
- Jean Ladrière (1921–2007)
- Cristina Lafont (born 1967)
- Kaave Lajevardi (born 1971)
- Imre Lakatos (1922–1974)^{[b]}^{[c]}^{[d]}^{[e]}
- Karel Lambert (born 1928)
- Corliss Lamont (1902–1995)
- Mark Lance (born 1959)
- Ludwig Landgrebe (1902–1991)
- Helen S. Lang (1947–2016)
- Rae Langton (born 1961)
- François Laruelle (1937–2024)
- Christopher Lasch (1932–1994)
- Serge Latouche (born 1940)
- Bruno Latour (1947–2022)
- Larry Laudan (1941–2022)
- Quentin Lauer (1917–1997)
- Stephen Laurence
- Albert Lautman (1908–1944)
- Thelma Z. Lavine (1915–2011)
- Katarzyna de Lazari-Radek (born 1975)
- Stephen Law (born 1960)
- Morris Lazerowitz (1907–1987)
- D. G. Leahy (1937-2014)
- Jonathan Lear (1948–2025)
- Dominique Lecourt (1944–2022)
- Michèle Le Dœuff (born 1948)^{[b]}^{[c]}^{[d]}
- Bruce Lee (1940–1973)
- Otis Hamilton Lee (1902–1948)
- Henri Lefebvre (1901–1991)^{[d]}
- Claude Lefort (1924–2010)
- Brian Leftow (born 1956)
- Keith Lehrer (born 1936)^{[b]}^{[c]}
- Yeshayahu Leibowitz (1903–1994)^{[d]}
- Wolfgang Leidhold (born 1950)
- Werner Leinfellner (1921–2010)
- Brian Leiter (born 1963)
- Hannes Leitgeb (born 1972)
- John Lemmon (1930–1966)
- Mary Leng
- James Lenman
- Kathleen Lennon
- James G. Lennox (born 1948)
- Thomas Lepeltier (born 1967)
- Robin Le Poidevin (born 1962)
- Ernest Lepore (born 1950)
- John A. Leslie (born 1940)
- Sarah-Jane Leslie
- Michael Leunig (1945–2024)
- Isaac Levi (1930–2018)
- Michael Levin (born 1943)
- Emmanuel Levinas (1906–1995)^{[a]}^{[b]}^{[c]}^{[d]}^{[e]}
- Joseph Levine (born 1952)
- Claude Lévi-Strauss (1908–2009)^{[b]}^{[c]}^{[d]}
- Bernard-Henri Lévy (born 1948)
- Tim Lewens (born 1974)
- David Kellogg Lewis (1941–2001)^{[a]}^{[b]}^{[c]}^{[d]}^{[e]}
- Hywel Lewis (1910–1992)
- Casimir Lewy (1919–1991)
- Dimitris Liantinis (1942–1998)
- S. Matthew Liao (born 1972)
- Suzanne Lilar (1901–1992)
- Mark Lilla (born 1956)
- George Lindbeck (1923–2018)
- Hilde Lindemann
- Rudolf Lingens ("born" 1918)
- Alphonso Lingis (1933–2025)
- Øystein Linnebo (born 1971)
- Leonard Linsky (1922–2012)
- Gilles Lipovetsky (born 1944)
- Arthur Lipsett (1936–1986)
- Peter Lipton (1954–2007)
- Christian List (born 1973)
- Elisabeth Lloyd (born 1956)
- Genevieve Lloyd (born 1941)
- Sharon Lloyd (born 1958)
- Barry Loewer (born 1945)
- Knud Ejler Løgstrup (1905–1981)
- Andrew Loke
- Loren Lomasky
- Alan Lomax (1915–2002)
- Bernard Lonergan (1904–1984)^{[d]}
- A. A. Long (born 1937)
- R. James Long (born 1938)
- Helen Longino (born 1944)
- Béatrice Longuenesse (born 1950)
- Bernard Loomer (1912–1985)
- Beth Lord (born 1976)
- Paul Lorenzen (1915–1995)^{[d]}
- Jerzy Łoś (1920–1998)
- E. J. Lowe (1950–2014)
- Hermann Lübbe (born 1926)
- John R. Lucas (1929–2020)^{[b]}
- Thomas Luckmann (1927–2016)
- Maria Lugones (1944–2020)
- Peter Ludlow (born 1957)
- Niklas Luhmann (1927–1998)
- William Lycan (born 1945)^{[b]}^{[c]}
- David Lyons (born 1935)
- Jean-François Lyotard (1924–1998)^{[a]}^{[b]}^{[c]}^{[d]}

== M ==
- David Macarthur
- William MacAskill (born 1987)
- Neil MacCormick (1941–2009)
- Dwight Macdonald (1906–1982)
- Margaret MacDonald (1907–1956)
- John MacFarlane
- Peter K. Machamer (1942–2023)
- Tibor R. Machan (1939–2016)
- Edouard Machery
- Alasdair MacIntyre (1929–2025)^{[a]}^{[b]}^{[c]}^{[d]}^{[f]}
- Louis Mackey (1926–2004)
- John Leslie Mackie (1917–1981)^{[b]}^{[c]}
- Penelope Mackie
- Catharine A. MacKinnon (born 1946)
- Donald M. MacKinnon (1913–1994)
- Fiona Macpherson (born 1971)
- John Macquarrie (1919–2007)
- Penelope Maddy (born 1950)
- Marylin Maeso (born 1988)
- Rosa María Rodríguez Magda (born 1957)
- Bryan Magee (1930–2019)
- Ofra Magidor
- Lorenzo Magnani (born 1952)
- Jane Maienschein (born 1950)
- Catherine Malabou (born 1959)
- David Malament (born 1947)
- Norman Malcolm (1911–1990)^{[a]}^{[b]}^{[c]}
- Malcolm X (1925–1965)
- Mostafa Malekian (born 1956)
- Merab Mamardashvili (1930–1990)^{[d]}
- Maurice Mandelbaum (1908–1987)
- Jon Mandle
- Pierre Manent (born 1949)
- Bonnie Mann (born 1961)
- Kate Manne
- Erin Manning (born 1969)
- Harvey Mansfield (born 1932)
- Ruth Barcan Marcus (1921–2012)^{[a]}^{[b]}^{[c]}
- Michael Marder (born 1980)
- John Marenbon (born 1955)
- Henry Margenau (1901–1997)
- Joseph Margolis (1924–2021)
- Julián Marías (1914–2005)
- Jean-Luc Marion (born 1946)
- Odo Marquard (1928–2015)
- Don Marquis (1935–2022)
- Giacomo Marramao (born 1946)
- Jill Marsden (born 1964)
- Donald A. Martin (born 1940)
- Jerry L. Martin
- Michael G. F. Martin (born 1962)
- Michael Lou Martin (1932–2015)
- Richard Milton Martin (1916–1985)
- Aloysius Martinich (born 1946)
- Abraham Maslow (1908–1970)
- Michelle Mason
- Michela Massimi
- Brian Massumi (born 1956)
- Margaret Masterman (1910–1986)
- Benson Mates (1919–2009)
- Alexandre Matheron (1926–2020)
- Freya Mathews
- Bimal Krishna Matilal (1935–1991)
- Wallace Matson (1921–2012)
- Gareth Matthews (1929–2011)
- Tim Maudlin (born 1958)
- Abul A'la Maududi (1903–1979)
- George I. Mavrodes (1926–2019)
- Rollo May (1909–1994)
- Todd May (born 1955)
- John Maynard Smith (1920–2004)
- Ernst Mayr (1904–2005)
- Wolfe Mays (1912–2005)
- Noëlle McAfee
- Linda López McAlister (1939–2021)
- Herbert McCabe (1926–2001)
- M. M. McCabe (born 1948)
- John McCarthy (1927–2011)
- Thomas A. McCarthy (born 1940)
- Ron McClamrock
- Rachel McCleary
- James William McClendon Jr. (1924–2000)
- John H. McClendon
- Deirdre McCloskey (born 1942)
- Sally McConnell-Ginet (born 1938)
- John J. McDermott (1932–2018)
- John McDowell (born 1942)^{[b]}^{[c]}
- Colin McGinn (born 1950)^{[b]}^{[c]}
- Marie McGinn
- Mary Kate McGowan
- Brian McGuinness (1927–2019)
- Leemon McHenry
- Ralph McInerny (1929–2010)
- Alison McIntyre
- Terence McKenna (1946–2000)
- Robert McKim (1952–2024)
- Colin McLarty
- Marshall McLuhan (1911–1980)
- Jeff McMahan (born 1954)
- Ernan McMullin (1924–2011)
- Sterling M. McMurrin (1914–1996)
- John McMurtry
- Margaret Mead (1901–1978)
- José Medina
- Brian Herbert Medlin (1927–2004)
- Paul E. Meehl (1920–2003)
- Esther Meek
- Quentin Meillassoux (born 1967)
- Alfred Mele
- David Hugh Mellor (1938–2020)^{[b]}^{[c]}
- Eduardo Mendieta (born 1963)
- Susan Mendus
- Christia Mercer
- Adèle Mercier (born 1958)
- Maurice Merleau-Ponty (1908–1961)^{[a]}^{[b]}^{[c]}^{[d]}^{[e]}
- Trenton Merricks
- Thomas Merton (1915–1968)
- Thomas Metzinger (born 1958)
- Frank Meyer (1909–1972)
- Leonard B. Meyer (1918–2007)
- Diana Tietjens Meyers
- Vincent Miceli (1915–1991)
- Alex Michalos (born 1935)
- Geoffrey Midgley (1921–1997)
- Mary Midgley (1919–2018)
- Stanley Milgram (1933–1984)
- Alan Millar (born 1947)
- David W. Miller (born 1942)
- Fred Miller
- George Armitage Miller (1920–2012)
- Izchak Miller (1935–1994)
- Perry Miller (1905–1963)
- Elijah Millgram (born 1958)
- Peter Millican (born 1958)
- Ruth Millikan (born 1933)^{[b]}^{[c]}
- Charles Wade Mills (1951–2021)
- Charles Wright Mills (1916–1962)
- Roberta Millstein
- Jean-Claude Milner (born 1941)
- Marvin Minsky (1927–2016)
- Cheryl Misak
- Christine Mitchell (born 1951)
- Sandra Mitchell (born 1951)
- Shaj Mohan
- Jitendra Nath Mohanty (born 1928)
- Annemarie Mol (born 1958)
- George Molnar (1934–1999)
- Ann M. Mongoven
- Ray Monk (born 1957)
- Richard Montague (1930–1971)^{[c]}^{[d]}
- Alan Montefiore (1926–2024)
- Ernest Addison Moody (1903–1975)
- Michele Moody-Adams
- James H. Moor
- A. W. Moore (born 1956)
- Charles A. Moore (1901–1967)
- Michael S. Moore
- Dermot Moran
- Richard Moran
- Julius Moravcsik (1931–2009)
- Max More (born 1964)
- J. P. Moreland (born 1948)
- Sidney Morgenbesser (1921–2004)
- Edgar Morin (1921–2026)
- Marie-Eve Morin
- Charles W. Morris (1901–1979)
- Christopher W. Morris (born 1949)
- Errol Morris (born 1948)
- Herbert Morris (born 1928)
- Margaret Morrison (1954–2021)
- Adam Morton (1945–2020)
- Timothy Morton (born 1968)
- Paul Moser (born 1957)
- Bob Moses (1935–2021)
- Michele Moses
- Jesús Mosterín (1941–2017)
- Mary Mothersill (1923–2008)
- Mou Zongsan (1909–1995)^{[a]}
- Chantal Mouffe (born 1943)
- Richard Mouw (born 1940)
- V. Y. Mudimbe (born 1941)
- Walter George Muelder (1907–2004)
- Stephen Mulhall (born 1962)
- Vincent C. Müller
- Kevin Mulligan (born 1951)
- Stephen Mumford (born 1965)
- Véronique Munoz-Dardé
- Sachiko Murata (born 1943)
- Iris Murdoch (1919–1999)^{[b]}^{[c]}
- John E. Murdoch (1927–2010)
- Murray Murphey (1928–2018)
- Arthur Edward Murphy (1901–1962)
- Nancey Murphy (born 1951)
- John Courtney Murray (1904–1967)
- Pauli Murray (1910–1985)
- Alan Musgrave (born 1940)

== N ==
- Arne Næss (1912–2009)^{[b]}^{[d]}
- Yujin Nagasawa (born 1975)
- Ernest Nagel (1901–1985)^{[a]}^{[b]}^{[c]}^{[d]}
- Jennifer Nagel
- Thomas Nagel (born 1937)^{[a]}^{[b]}^{[c]}^{[d]}
- Debra Nails (born 1950)
- Jean-Luc Nancy (1940–2021)^{[d]}
- Meera Nanda (born 1954)
- Uma Narayan (born 1958)
- Jan Narveson (born 1936)
- John Forbes Nash Jr. (1928–2015)
- Hossein Nasr (born 1933)
- Maurice Natanson (1924–1996)
- Anthony Sean Neal
- Stephen Neale (born 1958)
- Karen Neander (1954–2020)
- Antonio Negri (born 1933)
- Oskar Negt (1934–2024)
- Alexander Nehamas (born 1946)
- Susan Neiman (born 1955)
- Paul Nelson (born 1958)
- Nancy J. Nersessian
- John von Neumann (1903–1957)^{[a]}^{[b]}^{[c]}^{[d]}
- Robert Cummings Neville (born 1939)
- Allen Newell (1927–1992)
- Glen Newey (1961–2017)
- Jay Newman (1948–2007)
- William R. Newman (born 1955)
- Huey P. Newton (1942–1989)
- William Newton-Smith (born 1943)
- Shaun Nichols (born 1964)
- Eduardo Nicol (1907–1990)
- Julian Nida-Rümelin (born 1954)
- Martine Nida-Rümelin (born 1957)
- Cynthia Nielsen
- Kai Nielsen (1926–2021)
- Nishitani Keiji (1900–1990)^{[b]}^{[c]}^{[d]}
- David Shepherd Nivison (1923–2014)
- Paul Nizan (1905–1940)
- Kwame Nkrumah (1909–1972)^{[b]}^{[c]}
- Linda Nochlin (1931–2017)
- Nel Noddings (1929–2022)
- Alva Noë (born 1964)
- Constantin Noica (1909–1987)
- Ernst Nolte (1923–2016)
- John T. Noonan Jr. (1926–2017)
- Tore Nordenstam (born 1934)
- Kathryn Norlock (born 1969)
- Calvin Normore (born 1948)
- Christopher Norris (born 1947)
- David L. Norton (1930–1995)
- John D. Norton (born 1953)
- Kathleen Nott (1905–1999)
- Robert Nozick (1938–2001)^{[a]}^{[b]}^{[c]}^{[d]}
- Martha Nussbaum (born 1947)^{[a]}^{[b]}^{[c]}
- Mwalimu Julius Kambarage Nyerere (1922–1999)

== O ==
- Lucy O'Brien (born 1964)
- Mary O'Brien (1926–1998)
- Peg O'Connor
- Anthony O'Hear (born 1942)
- Brian E. O'Neil (1921–1985)
- Onora O'Neill (born 1941)
- Michael Oakeshott (1901–1990)^{[a]}^{[b]}^{[c]}^{[d]}
- Graham Oddie
- David S. Oderberg
- Jaishree Odin
- Charles Kay Ogden
- Ruwen Ogien
- Samir Okasha
- Susan Moller Okin (1946–2004)
- Kelly Oliver (born 1958)
- Revilo P. Oliver (1908–1994)
- Alan M. Olson (born 1939)
- Michel Onfray (born 1959)
- Walter Jackson Ong (1912–2003)
- Graham Oppy (born 1960)
- Toby Ord (born 1979)
- Gloria Origgi (born 1967)
- Rocío Orsi (1976–2014)
- Charles E. Osgood (1916–1991)
- Blake Ostler (born 1957)
- Konrad Ott (born 1959)
- James Otteson (born 1968)
- Albert Outler (1908–1989)
- Gwilyn Ellis Lane Owen (1922–1982)^{[b]}^{[c]}^{[d]}
- Joseph Owens (1908–2005)
- Susan Oyama (born 1943)

== P ==
- Jesús Padilla Gálvez (born 1959)
- Peter Pagin (born 1953)
- Clare Palmer (born 1967)
- Arthur Pap (1921–1959)
- David Papineau (born 1947)^{[b]}^{[c]}
- George Pappas (born 1942)
- Derek Parfit (1942–2017)^{[a]}^{[b]}^{[c]}
- Rohit Jivanlal Parikh (born 1936)
- Adrian Parr (born 1967)
- Charles Parsons (born 1933)
- Terence Parsons (born 1939)
- Barbara Partee (born 1940)
- John Passmore (1914–2004)^{[d]}
- Jan Patočka (1907–1977)^{[d]}
- Paul R. Patton (born 1950)
- L. A. Paul
- David L. Paulsen (1936–2020)
- Christopher Peacocke (born 1950)^{[b]}^{[c]}
- David Pearce
- David Pears (1921–2009)^{[b]}^{[c]}
- Leonard Peikoff (born 1933)
- Jean-Jacques Pelletier (born 1947)
- Zbigniew Pełczyński (1925–2021)
- Lorenzo Peña (born 1944)
- Carlo Penco (born 1948)
- Terence Penelhum (1929–2020)
- Roger Penrose (born 1931)
- Walker Percy (1916–1990)
- Derk Pereboom (born 1957)
- Carlos Pereda
- Chaïm Perelman (1912–1984)
- John Perry (born 1943)
- Richard Stanley Peters (1919–2011)^{[b]}
- Anna L. Peterson (born 1963)
- Philip Pettit (born 1945)
- Herman Philipse (born 1951)
- D. Z. Phillips (1934–2006)
- James Andrew Phillips
- Giovanni Piana (1940–2019)
- Alexander Piatigorsky (1929–2009)
- Eva Picardi (1948–2017)
- Gualtiero Piccinini (born 1970)
- Hanna Pickard (born 1972)
- Catherine Pickstock (born 1970)
- Josef Pieper (1904–1997)
- Jessica Pierce (born 1965)
- Massimo Pigliucci (born 1964)
- Adrian Piper (born 1948)
- Robert B. Pippin (born 1948)
- Madsen Pirie (born 1940)
- Robert M. Pirsig (1928–2017)
- George Pitcher (1925–2018)
- Ullin Place (1924–2000)
- John Plamenatz (1912–1975)
- Alvin Plantinga (born 1932)^{[a]}^{[b]}^{[c]}
- Mark de Bretton Platts (born 1947)
- Evelyn Pluhar
- Val Plumwood (1939–2008)
- Deborah C. Poff
- Thomas Pogge (born 1953)
- Louis P. Pojman (1935–2005)
- John L. Pollock (1940–2009)
- Leonardo Polo (1926–2013)
- Edward Pols (1919–2005)
- Richard Polt
- Richard Popkin (1923–2005)
- K. J. Popma (1903–1986)
- Karl Popper (1902–1994)^{[a]}^{[b]}^{[c]}^{[d]}^{[e]}
- Richard Posner (1939–2026)
- Mark Poster (1941–2012)
- Carl Posy
- Van Rensselaer Potter (1911–2001)
- John Poulakos (born 1948)
- Vaughan Pratt (born 1944)
- Dag Prawitz (born 1936)
- Huw Price (born 1953)
- Graham Priest (born 1948)
- Jesse Prinz
- Arthur Prior (1914–1969)^{[c]}^{[d]}^{[e]}
- Duncan Pritchard
- James Pryor (born 1968)
- Harry Prosch (1917–2005)
- Alexander Pruss (born 1973)
- James Pryor (born 1968)
- Stathis Psillos (born 1965)
- Lorenz Bruno Puntel (born 1935)
- Hilary Putnam (1926–2016)^{[a]}^{[b]}^{[c]}^{[d]}
- Ruth Anna Putnam (1927–2019)
- Andrew Pyle (born 1955)
- Zenon Pylyshyn (born 1937)

== Q ==
- Qiu Renzong (born 1933)
- Willard Van Orman Quine (1908–2000)^{[a]}^{[b]}^{[c]}^{[d]}^{[e]}
- Philip L. Quinn (1940–2004)
- Anthony Quinton (1925–2010)^{[b]}^{[c]}
- Sayyid Qutb (1906–1966)

== R ==
- Wlodek Rabinowicz (born 1947)
- Eduardo Rabossi (1930–2005)
- James Rachels (1941–2003)
- Melvin Rader (1903–1981)
- Karl Rahner (1904–1984)^{[d]}
- Peter Railton (born 1950)
- Vojin Rakić (born 1967)
- Tariq Ramadan (born 1962)
- Frank P. Ramsey (1903–1930)^{[a]}^{[b]}^{[c]}^{[d]}^{[e]}*
- Ian Thomas Ramsey (1915–1972)^{[d]}
- Paul Ramsey (1913–1988)
- Jacques Rancière (born 1940)
- Ayn Rand (1905–1982)^{[e]}^{[f]}
- Rose Rand (1903–1980)
- William J. Rapaport
- Anatol Rapoport (1911–2007)
- David M. Rasmussen
- Douglas B. Rasmussen (born 1948)
- Joseph Ratzinger (1927-2022)
- Heidi Ravven (born 1952)
- John Rawls (1921–2002)^{[a]}^{[b]}^{[c]}^{[d]}^{[e]}^{[f]}
- Yvanka B. Raynova (born 1959)
- Joseph Raz (born 1939)
- Michael C. Rea
- Miguel Reale (1910–2006)
- François Recanati (born 1952)
- Andrew J. Reck (1927–2021)
- Michael Redhead (1929–2020)
- Jonathan Rée (born 1948)
- Tom Regan (1938–2017)
- Bernard Reginster
- Robert Reich (born 1946)
- Helmut Reichelt (born 1939)
- Patricia Reif (1930–2002)
- George Reisman (born 1937)
- Nicholas Rescher (born 1928)^{[b]}^{[c]}
- Michael Resnik (born 1938)
- Greg Restall (born 1969)
- Georges Rey (born 1945)
- Rush Rhees (1905–1989)
- Janet Radcliffe Richards (born 1944)^{[b]}^{[c]}
- Henry S. Richardson (born 1955)
- John Richardson (born 1951)
- Radovan Richta (1924–1983)
- Paul Ricœur (1913–2005)^{[a]}^{[b]}^{[c]}^{[d]}^{[e]}^{[f]}
- Denise Riley (born 1948)
- Joachim Ritter (1903–1974)
- Abraham Robinson (1918–1974)
- Cedric Robinson (1940–2016)
- Howard Robinson (born 1945)
- Jenefer Robinson
- R. R. Rockingham Gill (born 1944)
- Sebastian Rödl (born 1967)
- Wendy Anne Rogers (born 1957)
- Bernard Rollin (born 1943)
- Holmes Rolston III (born 1932)
- Avital Ronell (born 1952)
- David Roochnik (born 1951)
- Amélie Rorty (1932–2020)
- Richard Rorty (1931–2007)^{[a]}^{[b]}^{[c]}^{[d]}^{[e]}^{[f]}
- Eugene Dennis Rose (1934–1982)
- Gillian Rose (1947–1995)
- Philipp Rosemann (born 1964)
- Gideon Rosen (born 1962)
- Michael E. Rosen (born 1952)
- Stanley Rosen (1929–2014)
- Alexander Rosenberg (born 1946)
- Harold Rosenberg (1906–1978)
- Jay Rosenberg (1942–2008)
- Nancy L. Rosenblum (born 1947)
- David M. Rosenthal
- Sandra B. Rosenthal (born 1936)
- Daniel Ross (born 1970)
- James F. Ross (1931–2010)
- Clément Rosset (1939–2018)
- Gian-Carlo Rota (1932–1999)
- John K. Roth (born 1940)
- Daniel Rothschild (born 1979)
- Brian Rotman
- Joseph Rovan (1918–2004)
- William L. Rowe (1931–2015)
- Mark Rowlands (born 1962)
- Sara Ruddick (1935–2011)
- Rosemary Radford Ruether (born 1936)
- Laura Ruetsche
- Ian Rumfitt (born 1964)
- Michael Ruse (born 1940)
- Gilbert Ryle (1900–1976)^{[a]}^{[b]}^{[c]}^{[d]}
- Robert Rynasiewicz
- David Rynin (1905–2000)
- Ali Shariati (1933–1977)

== S ==
- Mark Sainsbury (born 1943)^{[b]}^{[c]}
- Alia Al-Saji
- Jean-Michel Salanskis (born 1951)
- Ariel Salleh
- John Sallis (1938–2025)
- Nathan Salmon (born 1951)
- Wesley Salmon (1925–2001)^{[b]}^{[c]}
- Michael J. Sandel (born 1953)^{[b]}
- Constantine Sandis (born 1976)
- David H. Sanford (1937–2022)
- Steve F. Sapontzis (born 1945)
- Prabhat Rainjan Sarkar (1921–1990)
- Sahotra Sarkar (born 1962)
- Jean-Paul Sartre (1905–1980)^{[a]}^{[b]}^{[c]}^{[d]}^{[e]}
- Crispin Sartwell (born 1958)
- Barbara Sattler (born 1974)
- Debra Satz
- Jennifer Saul (born 1968)
- John Ralston Saul (born 1947)
- Simon Saunders (born 1954)
- Fernando Savater (born 1947)
- Julian Savulescu (born 1963)
- Geoffrey Sayre-McCord (born 1956)
- Thomas Scanlon (born 1940)^{[c]}
- Elaine Scarry (born 1946)
- Margaret Schabas (born 1954)
- Richard Schacht (born 1941)^{[b]}^{[c]}
- Francis Schaeffer (1912–1984)
- Jonathan Schaffer
- Kenneth F. Schaffner (born 1939)
- James V. Schall (1928–2019)
- Israel Scheffler (1923–2014)
- Samuel Scheffler (born 1951)
- J. L. Schellenberg (born 1959)
- Susanna Schellenberg
- Naomi Scheman
- Stephen Schiffer (born 1940)^{[c]}
- Hubert Schleichert (1935–2020)
- David Schmidtz (born 1955)
- J. B. Schneewind (born 1930)
- Malcolm Schofield (born 1942)
- Barbara Scholz (1947–2011)
- Sally Scholz (born 1968)
- Mark Schroeder
- Bart Schultz (born 1951)
- Dana Scott (born 1932)
- Michael Scriven (born 1928)
- Frithjof Schuon (1907–1998)
- Reiner Schürmann (1941–1993)
- Ofelia Schutte (born 1945)
- Lisa H. Schwartzman (born 1969)
- Steven Schwarzschild (1924–1989)
- Eric Schwitzgebel
- Charles E. Scott (born 1935)
- Dana Scott (born 1932)
- Carolina Scotto (born 1958)
- Roger Scruton (1944–2020)^{[b]}
- John Searle (born 1932)^{[a]}^{[b]}^{[c]}^{[d]}
- Jeff Sebo (born 1983)
- Sally Sedgwick
- David Sedley (born 1947)
- Thomas Seebohm (1934–2014)
- Jerome Segal (born 1943)
- Scott Sehon (born 1963)
- Wilfrid Sellars (1912–1989)^{[a]}^{[b]}^{[c]}^{[d]}^{[e]}
- Amartya Sen (born 1933)^{[b]}^{[c]}
- Michel Serres (1930–2019)
- Neven Sesardić (born 1949)
- Russ Shafer-Landau (born 1963)
- Oron Shagrir
- Israel Shahak (1933–2001)
- Timothy Shanahan (born 1960)
- Stuart Shanker (born 1952)
- Lawrence Shapiro
- Lisa Shapiro (born 1967)
- Scott J. Shapiro
- Stewart Shapiro (born 1951)
- A Satyanarayana Shastri (1925–2004)
- Steven Shaviro (born 1954)
- Dariush Shayegan (1935–2018)
- Tommie Shelby (born 1967)
- Susan Shell (born 1948)
- Gila Sher
- Donald W. Sherburne (1929–2021)
- Nancy Sherman (born 1951)
- Susan Sherwin (born 1947)
- Christopher Shields (born 1958)
- Seana Shiffrin
- Abner Shimony (1928–2015)
- Judith N. Shklar (1928–1992)
- Sydney Shoemaker (1931–2022)^{[b]}^{[c]}
- Alexis Shotwell (born 1974)
- Kristin Shrader-Frechette (born 1944)
- Laurie Shrage
- Henry Shue (born 1940)
- Richard Shusterman (born 1949)
- Frank Sibley (1923–1996)
- Theodore Sider
- David Sidorsky (born 1927)
- Larry Siedentop (born 1936)
- Susanna Siegel
- John Silber (1926–2012)
- Hugh J. Silverman (1945–2013)
- Anita Silvers (1940–2019)
- May Sim (born 1962)
- Alison Simmons (born 1965)
- Keith Simmons
- Herbert A. Simon (1916–2001)
- Yves Simon (1903–1961)
- Gilbert Simondon (1924–1989)
- Peter Simons (born 1950)
- William Angus Sinclair (1905–1954)
- Irving Singer (1925–2015)
- Marcus George Singer (1926–2016)
- Peter Singer (born 1946)^{[b]}^{[c]}
- Walter Sinnott-Armstrong (born 1955)
- Guy Sircello (1936–1992)
- B. F. Skinner (1904–1990)^{[d]}
- Lawrence Sklar (born 1938)
- John Skorupski (born 1946)
- Brian Skyrms (born 1938)
- Christina Slade (born 1953)
- Aaron Sloman (born 1936)
- Michael Slote
- Peter Sloterdijk (born 1947)
- Hans Sluga (born 1937)
- J. J. C. Smart (1920–2012)^{[a]}^{[b]}^{[c]}^{[d]}
- Ninian Smart (1927–2001)
- Timothy Smiley (born 1930)
- Barry Smith (born 1952)
- Daniel W. Smith (born 1958)
- Holly Martin Smith
- Huston Smith (1919–2016)
- John Edwin Smith (1921–2009)
- Michael A. Smith (born 1954)
- Nicholas D. Smith (born 1949)
- Nicholas H. Smith (born 1962)
- Nicholas J. J. Smith (born 1972)
- Tara Smith (born 1961)
- Raymond Smullyan (1919–2017)
- John Raymond Smythies (1922–2019)
- Yorick Smythies (1917–1980)
- Joseph D. Sneed (1938–2020)
- Nancy Snow
- Scott Soames (born 1946)
- Jordan Howard Sobel (1929–2010)
- Elliott Sober (born 1948)
- Alan Soble (born 1947)
- Robert Sokolowski (born 1934)
- Miriam Solomon
- Robert C. Solomon (1942–2007)
- Joseph Soloveitchik (1903–1993)^{[d]}^{[e]}
- Margaret Somerville (born 1942)
- Christina Hoff Sommers (born 1950)
- Fred Sommers (1923–2014)
- Tamler Sommers
- Susan Sontag (1933–2004)
- Kate Soper (born 1943)
- Richard Sorabji (born 1934)^{[b]}^{[c]}
- Stefan Lorenz Sorgner (born 1973)
- Abdolkarim Soroush (born 1945)
- David Sosa
- Ernest Sosa (born 1940)^{[b]}^{[c]}
- Janet Soskice (born 1951)
- Nicholas Southwood
- Thomas Sowell (born 1930)
- Robert Spaemann (1927–2018)
- David Spangler (born 1945)
- Elizabeth V. Spelman
- Dan Sperber (born 1942)
- Herbert Spiegelberg (1904–1990)
- Robert Spitzer (born 1952)
- Gayatri Chakravorty Spivak (born 1942)
- Wolfgang Spohn (born 1950)
- Jan Michael Sprenger (born 1982)
- Timothy Sprigge (1932–2007)^{[b]}^{[c]}
- Susanne Sreedhar
- Amia Srinivasan (born 1984)
- Edward Stachura (1937–1979)
- Konstantinos Staikos (born 1943)
- Newton Phelps Stallknecht (1906–1981)
- Robert Stalnaker (born 1940)^{[b]}^{[c]}
- Jeremy Stangroom
- Jason Stanley (born 1969)
- Glen Stassen (1936–2014)
- H. Peter Steeves, American academic and author
- Wolfgang Stegmüller (1923–1991)
- Mark Steiner (1942–2020)
- Isabelle Stengers (born 1949)
- Gunther Stent (1924–2008)
- James P. Sterba
- Kim Sterelny (born 1950)
- Robert Stern (1962–2024)
- Dolf Sternberger (1907–1989)
- Charles Leslie Stevenson (1908–1979)^{[b]}^{[c]}^{[d]}
- Helen Steward (born 1965)
- Jon Stewart
- Stephen Stich (born 1943) ^{[b]}^{[c]}
- Bernard Stiegler (1952–2020)
- Gail Stine (1940–1977)
- Kathleen Stock (born 1972)
- Dejan Stojanović (born 1959)
- Patrick Stokes (born 1978)
- Martin Stokhof (born 1950)
- Daniel Stoljar (born 1967)
- Alison Stone
- Karola Stotz (1963–2019)
- Jeffrey Stout (born 1950)
- David Stove (1927–1994)
- Galen Strawson (born 1952)
- P. F. Strawson (1919–2006)^{[a]}^{[b]}^{[c]}^{[d]}
- Sharon Street (born 1973)
- Gisela Striker (born 1943)
- Avrum Stroll (1921–2013)
- Edward Strong (1901–1990)
- Barry Stroud (1935–2019)^{[b]}^{[c]}
- Matthew Stuart
- John J. Stuhr
- Eleonore Stump (born 1947)
- Shannon Sullivan
- Cass Sunstein (born 1954)
- Anita Superson
- Frederick Suppe (born 1940)
- Patrick Suppes (1922–2014)
- Stewart Sutherland (1941–2018)
- Goran Švob (1947–2013)
- Norman Swartz (born 1939)
- William Sweet
- Brendan Sweetman (born 1962)
- Richard Swinburne (born 1934)^{[a]}^{[b]}^{[c]}
- Thomas Szasz (1920–2012)
- Edmond Bordeaux Szekely (1905–1979)
- Peter Szendy (born 1966)
- David Sztybel (born 1967)

== T ==
- Javad Tabatabai (born 1945)
- William W. Tait (born 1929)
- Nassim Nicholas Taleb (born 1960)
- Charles Taliaferro (born 1952)
- Robert B. Talisse (born 1970)
- Konrad Talmont-Kamiński (born 1971)
- Jacques Taminiaux (1928–2019)
- Tang Junyi (1909–1978)^{[a]}
- Torbjörn Tännsjö (born 1946)
- Alfred Tarski (1901–1983)^{[a]}^{[b]}^{[c]}^{[d]}^{[e]}
- John Tasioulas (born 1964)
- Alfred I. Tauber (born 1947)
- Charles Taylor (born 1931)^{[a]}^{[b]}^{[c]}^{[d]}
- Gabriele Taylor (born 1927)
- Ken Taylor (1954–2019)
- Paul C. Taylor (born 1967)
- Paul W. Taylor (1923–2015)
- Richard Clyde Taylor (1919–2003)^{[b]}^{[c]}
- Jenny Teichman (1930–2018)
- Larry Temkin
- Placide Tempels (1906–1977)
- Sergio Tenenbaum (born 1964)
- Neil Tennant (born 1950)
- Alice ter Meulen (born 1952)
- Lisa Tessman
- Eugene Thacker
- Paul Thagard (born 1950)
- Irving Thalberg Jr. (1930–1987)
- Helmut Thielicke (1908–1986)^{[d]}
- Laurence Thomas (born 1949)
- Amie Thomasson (born 1968)
- Josiah Thompson (born 1935)
- Patricia Thompson (1926–2016)
- Paul B. Thompson
- Judith Jarvis Thomson (1929–2020)^{[a]}^{[b]}^{[c]}
- Ole Thyssen (born 1944)
- Valerie Tiberius
- Pavel Tichý (1936–1994)
- Claudine Tiercelin (born 1952)
- Lynne Tirrell
- Tzvetan Todorov (1939–2017)^{[d]}
- Orlando Toledo (born 1964)
- Julius Tomin (born 1938)
- Rosemarie Tong (born 1949)
- Michael Tooley (born 1941)
- Roberto Torretti (born 1930)
- Stephen Toulmin (1922–2009)
- Cecilia Trifogli (born 1961)
- Roger Trigg (born 1941)
- Tsang Lap Chuen (born 1943)
- Mpho Tshivhase
- Nancy Tuana
- Peter Tudvad (born 1966)
- Ernst Tugendhat (born 1930)^{[b]}^{[c]}
- Raimo Tuomela (1940–2020)
- Colin Murray Turbayne (1916–2006)
- Alan Turing (1912–1954)^{[b]}^{[c]}^{[d]}^{[e]}
- Ray Turner (born 1947)
- Stephen Park Turner (born 1951)
- Joseph Tussman (1914–2005)
- Michael Tye (born 1950)
- Anna-Teresa Tymieniecka (1923–2014)

== U ==
- Thomas Uebel (born 1952)
- Peter Unger (born 1942)
- Roberto Mangabeira Unger (born 1947)
- Ivo Urbančič (1930–2016)
- J. O. Urmson (1915–2012)
- Alasdair Urquhart (born 1945)

== V ==
- William F. Vallicella
- Johan van Benthem (born 1949)
- Herman Van Breda (1911–1974)
- Bas van Fraassen (born 1941)^{[b]}^{[c]}
- Tim van Gelder
- Jean van Heijenoort (1912–1986)
- Jean Vanier (1928–2019)
- Peter van Inwagen (born 1942)
- Luuk van Middelaar (born 1973)
- Bryan W. Van Norden (born 1962)
- Philippe Van Parijs (born 1951)
- Peter Vardy (born 1945)
- Francisco Varela (1946–2001)
- Gary Varner (born 1957)
- Juha Varto (born 1949)
- Achille Varzi (born 1958)
- Gianni Vattimo (born 1936)^{[d]}
- Achille Varzi (born 1958)
- Nicla Vassallo (born 1963)
- Adolfo Sánchez Vázquez (1915–2011)
- Henry Babcock Veatch (1911–1997)
- J. David Velleman (born 1952)
- Zeno Vendler (1921–2004)
- Giovanni Ventimiglia
- Peter-Paul Verbeek (born 1971)
- Dirk Verhofstadt (born 1955)
- Etienne Vermeersch (1934–2019)
- Michel Villey (1914–1988)^{[d]}
- Paul Virilio (1932–2018)
- Eliseo Vivas (1901–1991)
- Gregory Vlastos (1907–1991)^{[b]}^{[c]}^{[d]}
- Eric Voegelin (1901–1985)^{[d]}
- Candace Vogler
- John von Neumann (1903–1957)
- Heinrich von Staden (born 1939)
- Jules Vuillemin (1920–2001)

== W ==
- Jeremy Waldron (born 1953)
- Margaret Urban Walker (born 1948)
- Mark Alan Walker (born 1963)
- Ralph C. S. Walker (born 1944)
- R. Jay Wallace (born 1957)
- Adrian Walsh (born 1963)
- W. H. Walsh (1913–1986)
- Douglas N. Walton (1942–2020)
- Kendall Walton (born 1939)^{[c]}
- Wil Waluchow (born 1953)
- Denis M. Walsh, Canadian academic and writer
- Michael Walzer (born 1935)^{[b]}^{[c]}
- Ernest Wamba dia Wamba (1942–2020)
- Hao Wang (1921–1995)^{[b]}^{[c]}
- Nigel Warburton (born 1962)
- Keith Ward (born 1938)
- Georgia Warnke
- Geoffrey J. Warnock (1923–1996)^{[b]}^{[c]}
- Mary Warnock (1924–2019)^{[b]}^{[c]}
- Karen J. Warren (1947–2020)
- Thomas B. Warren (1920–2000)
- Marx W. Wartofsky (1928–1997)
- Robin Waterfield (born 1952)
- John W. N. Watkins (1924–1999)
- John Leonard Watling (1923–2004)
- Alan Watts (1915–1973)
- Paul Watzlawick (1921–2007)
- Helmut Wautischer
- Brian Weatherson
- Richard M. Weaver (1910–1963)
- Eugene Webb (born 1938)
- Michel Weber (born 1963)
- William Stone Weedon (1908–1984)
- Simone Weil (1909–1943)^{[a]}^{[b]}^{[c]}^{[d]}
- Rivka Weinberg
- Joan Weiner
- Jack Russell Weinstein (born 1969)
- Paul Weiss (1901–2002)
- Morris Weitz (1916–1981)
- Carl Friedrich von Weizsäcker (1912–2007)
- Philip Welch (born 1954)
- Christopher Heath Wellman (born 1967)
- Albrecht Wellmer (1933–2018)
- Peter Wenz (born 1945)
- Archibald Garden Wernham (1916–1989)
- Cornel West (born 1953)
- Robert B. Westbrook (born 1950)
- Anthony Weston (born 1954)
- Philip Wheelwright (1901–1970)
- Rebecca Whisnant
- Alan White (born 1951)
- Alan R. White (1922–1992)
- Morton White (1917–2016)
- Jennifer Whiting
- Kyle Powys Whyte
- Heather Widdows (born 1972)
- Nettie Wiebe (born 1949)
- Philip P. Wiener (1905–1992)
- David Wiggins (born 1933)^{[b]}^{[c]}
- Dan Wikler (born 1946)
- John Daniel Wild (1902–1972)
- Frederick Wilhelmsen (1923–1996)
- Kathy Wilkes (1946–2003)
- Dallas Willard (1935–2013)
- Cynthia Willett
- Bernard Williams (1929–2003)^{[a]}^{[b]}^{[c]}^{[d]}^{[e]}
- C. J. F. Williams (1930–1997)
- Michael Williams (born 1947)
- Timothy Williamson (born 1955)^{[c]}
- Jan Willis (born 1948)
- Amos N. Wilson (1940/41–1995)
- Catherine Wilson (born 1951)
- Jessica Wilson
- Margaret Dauler Wilson (1939–1998)
- Mark Wilson (born 1947)
- Robert Wilson (born 1964)
- William C. Wimsatt (born 1941)
- Peter Winch (1926–1997)^{[b]}^{[c]}
- Richard Dien Winfield (born 1950)
- Ajume Wingo
- Langdon Winner (born 1944)
- William J. Winslade (born 1941)
- Kwasi Wiredu (born 1931)
- John Wisdom (1904–1993)^{[b]}^{[c]}
- John Oulton Wisdom (1908–1993)
- Charlotte Witt (born 1951)
- Monique Wittig (1935–2003)
- Karol Wojtyła (1920–2005)
- Jan Woleński (born 1940)
- Susan R. Wolf (born 1952)
- Ursula Wolf (born 1951)
- Jonathan Wolff (born 1959)
- Robert Paul Wolff (born 1933)
- Sybil Wolfram (1931–1993)
- Elizabeth Wolgast (1929–2020)
- Sheldon Wolin (1922–2015)
- Richard Wollheim (1923–2003)^{[b]}^{[c]}
- Nicholas Wolterstorff (born 1932)
- David B. Wong
- Allen W. Wood (born 1942)
- David Wood (born 1946)
- W. Hugh Woodin (born 1955)
- Paul Woodruff (born 1943)
- John Woods (born 1937)
- Raphael Woolf
- John Worrall (born 1946)
- Mark Wrathall (born 1965)
- Crispin Wright (born 1942)^{[b]}^{[c]}
- Georg Henrik von Wright (1916–2003)^{[a]}^{[b]}^{[c]}^{[d]}
- W. D. Wright (born 1936)
- Jerzy Wróblewski (1926–1990)^{[d]}
- Alison Wylie (born 1954)
- Mark Wynn (born 1963)
- Edith Wyschogrod (1930–2009)
- Michael Wyschogrod (1928-2015)

== X ==
- Xu Liangying (1920–2013)

== Y ==
- Stephen Yablo
- George Yancy (born 1961)
- Keith Yandell (1938–2020)
- Cemal Yıldırım (1925–2009)
- Francis Parker Yockey (1917–1960)
- John Howard Yoder (1927–1997)
- John W. Yolton (1921–2005)
- Robert M. Yost (1917–2006)
- Arthur M. Young (1905–1995)
- Damon Young (born 1975)
- Iris Marion Young (1949–2006)
- Julian Young (born 1943)
- Robert M. Young (1935–2019)
- Jiyuan Yu (1964–2016)

== Z ==
- Santiago Zabala (born 1975)
- Richard Zach
- Naomi Zack
- Linda Trinkaus Zagzebski (born 1946)
- Dan Zahavi (born 1967)
- José Zalabardo (born 1964)
- Edward N. Zalta (born 1952)
- María Zambrano (1904–1991)
- Marlène Zarader (1949–2025)
- Ingo Zechner (born 1972)
- Eddy Zemach
- John Zerzan (born 1943)
- Zhou Guoping (born 1945)
- Zygmunt Ziembiński (1920–1996)
- Paul Ziff (1920–2003)
- Robert Zimmer (born 1953)
- Dean Zimmerman
- Michael E. Zimmerman (born 1946)
- Alexander Zinoviev (1922–2006)
- Slavoj Žižek (born 1949)^{[f]}
- Elémire Zolla (1926–2002)
- Volker Zotz (born 1956)
- François Zourabichvili (1965–2006)
- Catherine Zuckert (born 1942)
- Michael Zuckert (born 1942)
- Rachel Zuckert (born 1969)
- Estanislao Zuleta (1935–1990)
- Alenka Zupančič (born 1965)
- Jan Zwicky (born 1955)

== See also ==
- 20th-century philosophy
- List of philosophers born in the centuries BC
- List of philosophers born in the 1st through 10th centuries
- List of philosophers born in the 11th through 14th centuries
- List of philosophers born in the 15th and 16th centuries
- List of philosophers born in the 17th century
- List of philosophers born in the 18th century
- List of philosophers born in the 19th century
