= Eduardo Barrio =

Argentine logician

Eduardo Barrio is an Argentine logician.

== Work ==
Since 2005, he is professor of logic at University of Buenos Aires and researcher at CONICET. He works in philosophy of logic, mainly interested in the notion of truth, especially in semantic paradoxes and the expressive limits of formal languages. He also works on non-classical logic, higher-order logic, and unrestricted quantification. He is also editor-in-chief of the collection "Enciclopedia Lógica", published by EUDEBA, which includes the first Spanish translation of the L. T. F. Gamut's work Logic, Language, and Meaning.

He was visiting professor at MIT, CUNY, Oxford University and MCMP. As of 2020, Barrio is currently the director of BA-Logic.

He has published three books: La Verdad Desestructurada, Las Lógicas de la Verdad, (both published by EUDEBA) and Paradojas, Paradojas y más Paradojas (published by Collage Pu.). He has several articles published by the best journals in the area: for example, in Synthese, Review of Symbolic Logic, Journal of Philosophical Logic, Logic Journal of the IGPL, Studia Logica and Analysis.

== Projects ==
- Head of the project (with Hannes Leitgeb - MCMP - LMU Munich) "Truth, Paradoxes and Modalities” DAAD-MinCyT, DA/12/01, 2013–2014
- Co-director—along with Volker Halbach of a collaborative research group called Truth, Open-endedness and Inexpressibility
- Head of the project (with Ole Hjortland - MCMP - LMU Munich) “The Logics of Truth: Operational and Substructural Approaches” (PCB II) CONICET-DFG-MinCyT. 2015–2017

== Bibliography ==
- Barrio, E. (1998). La verdad desestructurada. Buenos Aires: EUDEBA.
