= A Satyanarayana Shastri =

Indian philosopher

- Born: June 2, 1925
- Died: January 14, 2004 (aged 78); Bangalore, Karnataka, India

Philosophical work
- Main interests: Upanishads, Sadhana

A Satyanarayana Shastri (June 2, 1925 – January 14, 2004) was an Indian philosopher. After his BSc in 1943 from Central College and MSc from Dharwar, he worked at Vijaya College as a lecturer and later as a Professor for 18 years in the Department of Chemistry.

He worked with Vivekananda Yoga Anusandhana Samsthana and became the Chief Adviser of the Deemed University Vivekananda Yoga Mahavidyapeetham of VYTASA. He was also the president of Advaita Samsodhana Pratisthana, chaired by Sri Arun Kumar.

He focused on the Upanishads and Sadhana. He was considered a sadhak par excellence. It was believed that he turned to spirituality initially to solve his own tensions and anxieties. His exposition of Yoga Vasistha made him very popular among his students.

Shastriji, as he was nicknamed by his students, focused on the message of the Upanishads and Sadhana and the concept of Dharma centred on Sukha Duhkha Pariksa. His talks were related to practical examples from modern life.

His understanding of sadhana is condensed in the proclamations repeated in all his talks:

Sukha is silence and deeper the prasamana, greater the happiness. Slowing of thoughts and expansion of mind are the key components of all yoga sadhana.

Satyanarayana Shastri died on January 14, 2004, in Bangalore. He is survived by his wife, three sons, and four daughters.

== Speeches ==
Some of Shastriji's speeches have been uploaded on YouTube. His speeches center around subject matter such as Manonasa (Sanskrit: मनोनाश, romanized: Manonāśa, lit. 'Destruction of the Mind'), Atma bodha, and his views on spirituality.
