= Peter Pagin =

Swedish philosopher

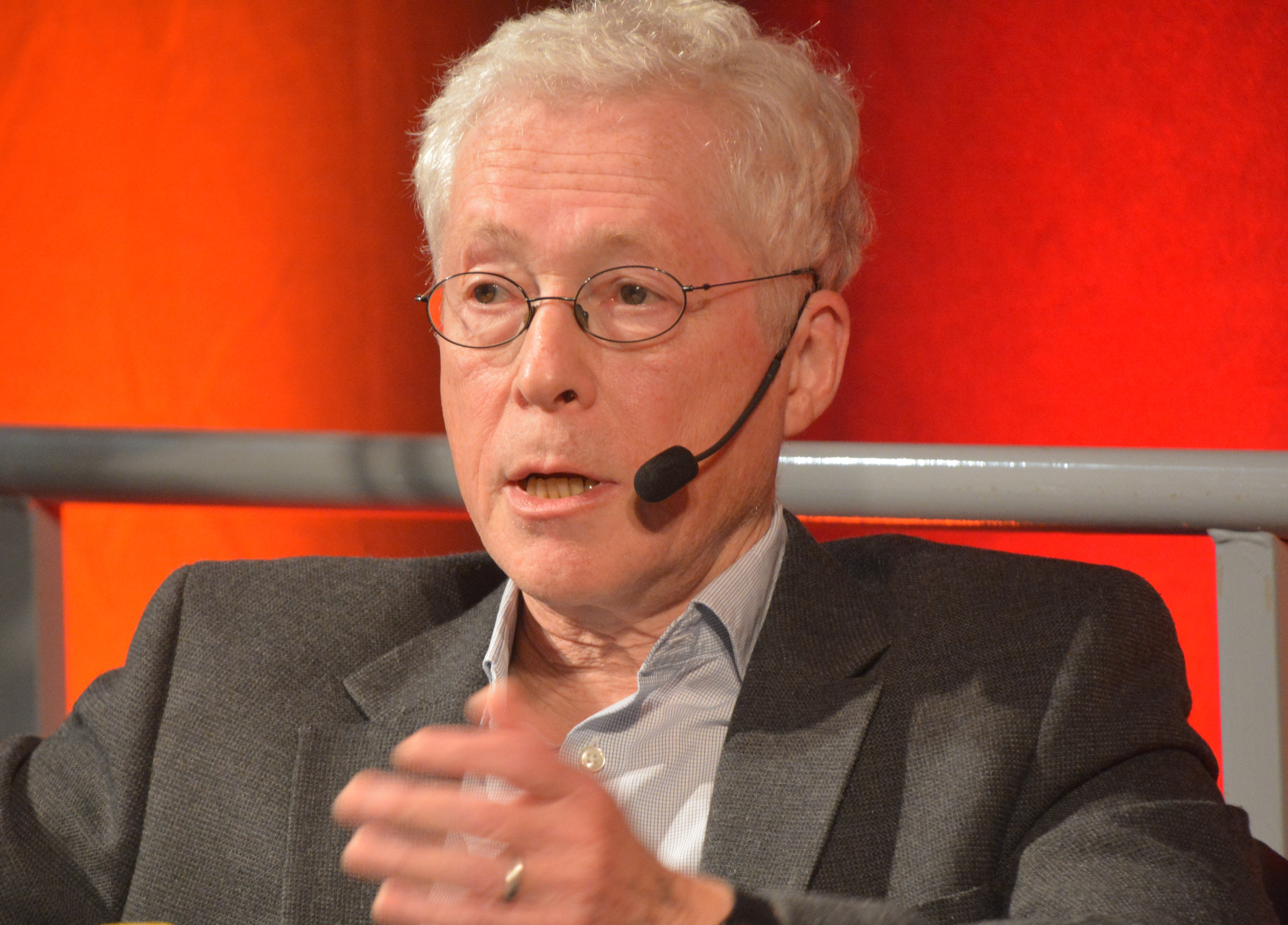
Image of Peter Pagin

Peter Pagin (born 1953) is Professor of Philosophy at Stockholm University. He is a specialist in the philosophy of language and has worked extensively on foundational issues in semantics and on technical and philosophical problems about the compositionality of meaning.

== Work ==
One of Pagin's principal aims is to provide the foundations for seemingly basic semantic concepts like truth and reference in terms of the role that compositional semantic theories must play in explaining the success of linguistic communication. This has led him into various areas of the philosophy of language and logic, and he has written about rules and rule-following, vagueness, synonymy, and assertion, and about the works of Wittgenstein, Quine, Davidson and Dummett. Pagin has also worked in fields adjacent to the philosophy of language such as the philosophy of mind (work on sensation terms), cognitive psychology and psychiatry (work on speakers with autism), and the history of literature (work on indexicality and point of view).

== Academia ==
Peter Pagin was born in Stockholm and educated at Stockholm University. He received a bachelor's degree in Philosophy and Mathematics in 1981 and a PhD in 1987 (for a thesis written under the supervision of Dag Prawitz). From 1987 to 1991 Pagin held a postdoctoral research position (forskarassistent) and received a Docent degree in 1992. In 1996, he was a Fellow at the Swedish Collegium for Advanced Study (SCAS) in Uppsala. He was made a full Professor in 2002.

== Selected publications ==
- Compositionality and Context. In G Preyer (ed), Contextualism in Philosophy, Oxford University Press, 2005, 303–348.
- Communication and Strong Compositionality. Journal of Philosophical Logic 32, 2003, pp. 287–322.
- A Quinean Definition of Synonymy', Erkenntnis 55, 2001, pp. 7–32.
- Sensation terms', Dialectica 54, 2000, pp. 177–99.
- Flexible Variable-binding and Montague Grammar', with Dag Westerståhl, in P Dekker och M Stokhof (eds), Proceedings of the Ninth Amsterdam Colloquium , Amsterdam 1994, pp. 519–525.
- Predicate Logic with Flexibly Binding Operators and Natural Language Semantics. (With Dag Westerståhl) Journal of Logic, Language and Information 2, 1993, pp. 89–128.
