= William James Booth =

American political scientist

William James Booth is a professor in the department of political science and in the department of philosophy at Vanderbilt University.

W. James Booth earned a PhD from Harvard University (Department of Government) in 1982.

== Selected publications ==
- Communities of Memory. On Witness, Identity, and Justice, Cornell University Press, 2006, ISBN 978-0-8014-4436-4
- "Maîtres chez nous: Some questions about culture and continuity. A response to Alan Patten's "Rethinking culture: the social lineage account." American Political Science Review 107(2013)
- "From this Far Place: On Justice and Absence," American Political Science Review 105(2011): 750–764.
- "The Color of Memory: Reading Race with Ralph Ellison." Political Theory 36(2008): 683–707.
- "The Work of Memory: Time, Identity, and Justice." Social Research 75(2008): 237–262.
- Communities of Memory: On Witness, Identity, and Justice. New York: Cornell University Press, 2006.
- "The Unforgotten. Memories of Justice." American Political Science Review 95(2001): 777–791.
- Foreigners: Insiders, Outsiders and the Ethics of Membership. Review of Politics 59(1997):259-292
