= Tore Nordenstam =

Swedish philosopher

Tore Nordenstam (born December 2, 1934) is a Swedish philosopher, with higher degrees from Gothenburg (M.A. 1961, fil. lic. 1961) and the University of Khartoum (Ph.D. 1965); he also studied at Uppsala and Oxford.

Between 1961 and 1998, Nordenstam held teaching positions at the Universities of Khartoum, Umeå, and Bergen. In Bergen, he was first Reader in Philosophy (1968–81) and later Professor of Philosophy (1981–98). He is currently Professor Emeritus from Bergen.

In his philosophical career, Nordenstam moved from the analytical philosophy of language into ethics, aesthetics and the philosophy of the humanities.

Nordenstam has published a number of books, the most important of which are Sudanese Ethics (Stockholm: The Scandinavian Institute of African Studies / Almqvist & Wiksell, 1968) and, much more recently, The Power of Example (Stockholm: Santörus Academic Press, 2009); the content of the latter appeared earlier in Swedish as Exemplets makt in Dialoger 69-70 (Stockholm, 2005). He has also published a goodly number of journal articles, mostly classifiable into the areas mentioned above, and some closely related to his book projects.

A foreign colleague of Nordenstam remarks, “Readers of Nordenstam’s works will find him to be a clear, careful, original and touchingly humanistic thinker, influenced by Wittgenstein and others, but not in thrall to any.”
