= Rivka Weinberg =

American philosopher

- Education: Brooklyn College; University of Michigan
- Scientific career
- Fields: Philosophy
- Workplaces: Scripps College

Rivka Weinberg is an American philosopher. She is a professor of philosophy at Scripps College. She specializes in bioethics, the ethics of procreation, and the metaphysics of birth, death, and existence.

== Career ==
Weinberg attended Brooklyn College, where she earned a BA degree. She then graduated with a PhD from the University of Michigan.

In 2016, Weinberg published the book The Risk of a Lifetime: How, When, and Why Procreation May Be Permissible. In The Risk of a Lifetime, Weinberg studies the ethics of human procreation, focusing not on common ethical topics in procreation such as abortion rights but rather on the problem of when it can be justified to create a human being. The book is therefore motivated by the question of how to judge the value of being a person against the value of never existing at all. Weinberg takes as a starting point a perspective that has been called pessimistic: the notion that life is inherently bad, with many attendant risks, and that the decision to procreate must be weighed against these risks. Building on a Rawlsian theory of justice and responding to the nonidentity problem of philosophers like Derek Parfit, Weinberg argues that procreation can only be justified under two conditions: a person who chooses to procreate must have the intention to nurture and care for their child once it is born, and they must believe that the risk they impose on their future child by creating it would be rational for them to accept as a pre-condition of their own birth in exchange for the opportunity to then procreate. This latter constraint is drawn from the contractualism of John Rawls and the moral philosophy of Immanuel Kant. Weinberg makes an analogy between these requirements and the risk-management requirements that are placed on people who handle hazardous materials like uranium; in the case of procreation ethics, the hazardous materials that can plausibly bring harm to others are human gametes.

Several implications of the theory of procreation ethics that Weinberg developed in The Risk of a Lifetime have been explored in journal articles or the popular media. For example, since Weinberg's theory of procreation ethics explicitly weighs the risks that are imposed on children by creating them, it implies that people who are in a situation that would likely expose their offspring to greater risks therefore are less likely to have a rational case for procreation; this includes people with heritable diseases and those living in severe poverty. It also suggests that the risks imposed by global warming should have some bearing on peoples' procreation decisions. Another implication of Weinberg's theory that she notes in The risk of a lifetime is that sperm donors and egg donors have responsibility as parents for the children that their gametes are used to create; she has further explored this implication in academic journals.

Weinberg has also written news media articles about the culpability that individuals have in morally compromising situations, including individual complicity in evil deeds that are encouraged by powerful people; her writing on this topic was subsequently discussed in The Washington Post, Fast Company, and Business Insider.
