= Carlos Pereda =

Uruguayan/Mexican philosopher

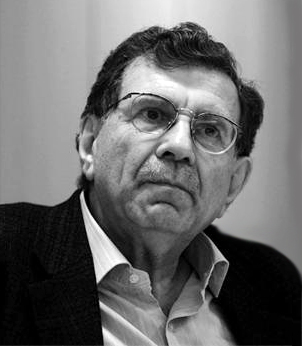
Carlos Pereda

Carlos Pereda Failache (Florida, Uruguay) is an Uruguayan/Mexican philosopher, and emeritus researcher at UNAM's Institute for Philosophical Research. Pereda is the author of more than 50 articles, 10 books, and winner of the Siglo XXI Essay Prize, 2008, for his book Learnings from the Exile [Los aprendizajes del exilio]. He has been president of the Mexican Philosophical Association/

== Biography ==
Carlos Pereda did his BA studies in Philosophy and Education Sciences at the University of the Republic, Uruguay, and won the UNESCO Prize for the best bachelor's thesis in 1968 awarded by the Paris Nanterre University, France. He completed his master's and doctorate studies at the University of konstanz, Germany.

In 1979 he joined the Universidad Autónoma Metropolitanaas a professor and then in 1984 he joined UNAM's, Institute for Philosophical Research.

He has done postdoctoral visits and has been a lecturer at the University of Oxford (1979), Brown University (1982), Alexander Von Humboldt-Stiftung (1986-88), CSIC Spain (1993-94), University of Buenos Aires (1996), Charles III University of Madrid (1999, 2006-2007), University of Virginia (2001), Complutense University of Madrid (2003-2004), University of the Republic (2004), University of Texas (2005), Spain's National University of Distance Education (2007), and the University of Barcelona (2009).

In 1998 he won the National University Prize in Humanities Research awarded by UNAM and in 2008 the Siglo XXI Essay Prize for his book Learnings from the Exile [Los aprendizajes del exilio]. He has been part of the jury for the Octavio Paz Poetry and Essay Award (1999) and the National University Award (1999-2002, 2006-2007). He was president of the Mexican Philosophical Association (1998-2000) and of the Inter-American Society of Philosophy (1998-2004). In November 2011, the Institute of Philosophical Research held an event in honor of his work and career: Normativity and Argumentation. Dialogues with Carlos Pereda. He is currently a member of the Institut International de Philosophie.

== Thought ==
Pereda's work deals primarily with philosophy's most fundamental tool: argumentation. In discussing the nature and usefulness of said tool, Pereda's work covers a very broad spectrum of disciplines that includes epistemology, political science, ethics and literature. His book Argumentative Vertigos: An Ethics of Dispute [Vértigos argumentales: una ética de la disputa] (1994) offers an original contribution to the theory of argumentation.

== Books ==
- Debates [Debates] Fondo de Cultura Económica, Mexico, 1987.
- To Converse is Human [Conversar es humano]. El Colegio Nacional/Fondo de Cultura Económica, Mexico, 1991.
- Reason and Uncertainty [Razón e incertidumbre]. Siglo XXI Editores, Mexico, 1994.
- Argumentative Vertigos: An Ethics of Dispute [Vértigos argumentales. Una ética de la disputa]. Anthropos, Spain, 1994.
- Homeless dreams: An Essay on Philosophy, Moral and Literature [Sueños de vagabundos. Un ensayo sobre filosofía, moral y literatura]. Visor, Spain. 1998.
- Critique of Arrogant Reason [Crítica de la razón arrogante]. Taurus-Alfaguara, Mexico, 1999.
- Learnings from the Exile [Los aprendizajes del exilio]. Siglo XXI Editores, México, 2008.
- On Trust [Sobre la confianza]. Herder, Bacerlona, 2009.
- Philosophy and the Strangeness Perspective [La filosofía y la perspectiva de la extrañeza]. UNAM, Mexico, 2013.
- Philosophy in Mexico in the Twentieth Century. Notes from a Participant.[La filosofía en México en el siglo XX. Apuntes de un participante]. Conaculta, Mexico, 2013.
- Carlos Pereda & Edgar González-Ruiz. Research Techniques I. Numancia, Mexico 1986.
- Carlos Pereda & Enrique Serrano. Introduction to Philosophy. SEIT, SEP, Mexico, 1986.

== Edited books ==
- Mauricio Beuchot & Carlos Pereda. Hermeneutics, Aesthetics and History. IIF, UNAM, Mexico, 2001.
- Julio Beltrán & Carlos Pereda. Certainty, a Myth? Naturalism, Fallibilism, Skepticism. IIF, UNAM, 2002.
- Maria Herrera-Lima, Cesar Gonzales-Ochoa & Carlos Pereda. Memory and Melancholy: reflections from literature, philosophy and art theory. UNAM, Mexico, 2007.
