= G. Aldo Antonelli =

Italian philosopher (1962–2015)

G. Aldo Antonelli (1962 – October 11, 2015) was an Italian-born philosopher and academic. He taught at the University of California, Irvine before joining the philosophy department at the University of California, Davis in 2008. Professor Antonelli was known largely for his work in logic.

== Biography ==
He grew up in Torino, Italy, where he received an undergraduate degree in philosophy. After some time, he attended the University of Pittsburgh for a post-graduate degree, obtaining his PhD. Prior to taking up his position at UC Davis, he also taught for many years at UC Irvine, and held appointments at Pittsburgh, Yale, Stanford, Michigan State, and elsewhere. He died on October 11, 2015.

== Research ==
An expert in pure and applied logic, his research largely focused on issues in defeasible reasoning and non-monotonic logic. His more recent work in philosophy of logic was concerned with applications of generalized quantifier theory and abstraction principles to the foundations of arithmetic in the more general context of Fregean foundations, as well as making contributions to Frege scholarship.
