= Peter Tudvad =

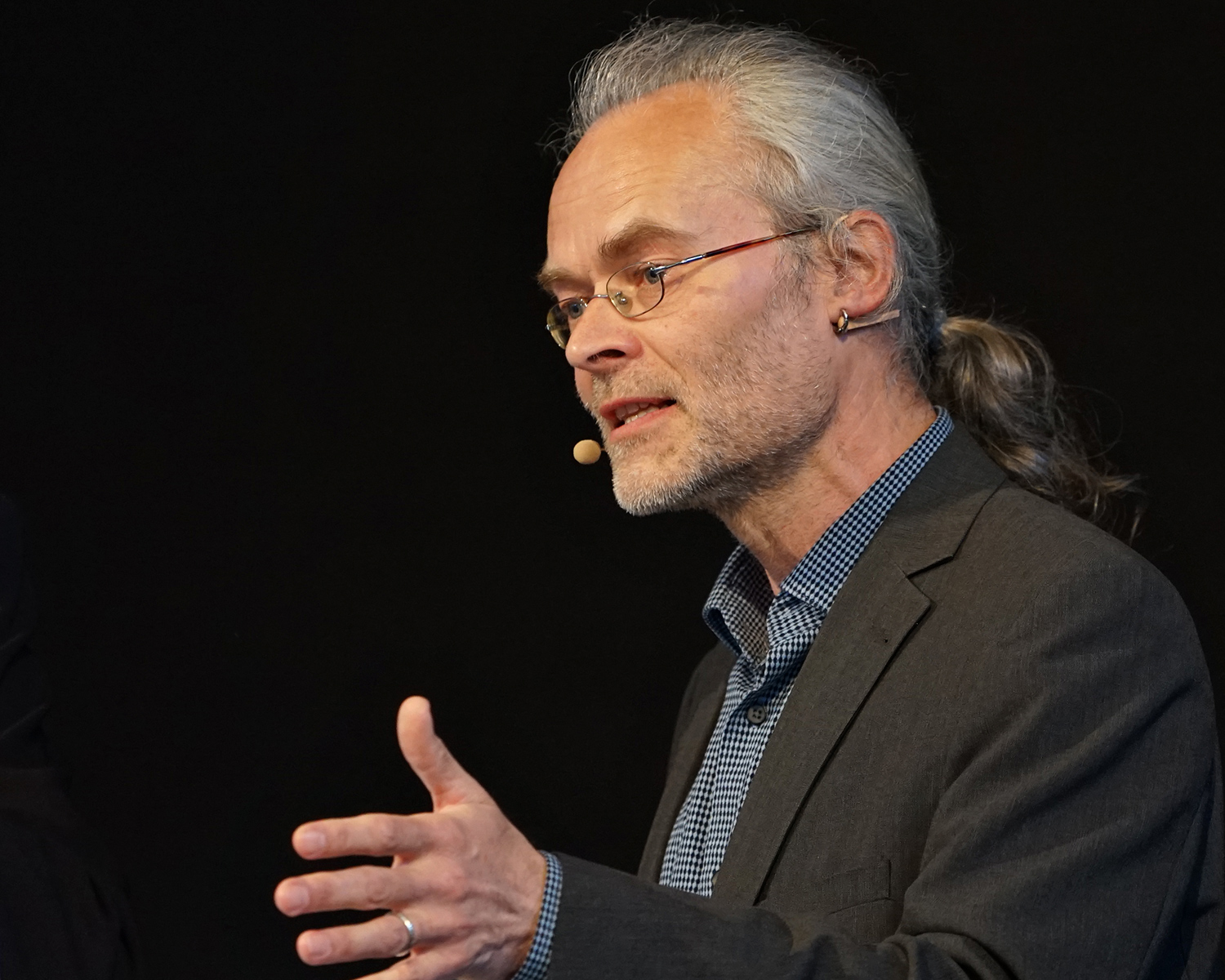
Peter Tudvad (2019)

Peter Tudvad (born 27 April 1966 in Holme south of Århus) is a Danish Søren Kierkegaard scholar, author, philosopher and social critic, formerly at the Søren Kierkegaard Research Center and at the University of Copenhagen; he left the Søren Kierkegaard Research Center after a heated debate with colleague Joakim Garff, whose Kierkegaard biography he lambasted in his own book Kierkegaards København.

His 2009 book Nurse in the Third Reich, an account of a Danish woman serving as a nurse in the German Red Cross, achieved some note.
