= Nicholas H. Smith =

Australian philosopher

Nicholas Smith
- Born: 1962 (age 63–64)

Education
- Education: University of Glasgow (PhD), University of York (MA), Newcastle University (BA)
- Thesis: Modernity, crisis and critique: an examination of rival philosophical conceptions in the work of Jürgen Habermas and Charles Taylor (1992)
- Doctoral advisor: C.F.J. Martin

Philosophical work
- Era: 21st-century philosophy
- Region: Western philosophy
- School: Continental
- Institutions: University of Connecticut, Macquarie University
- Main interests: hermeneutics and political philosophy

Nicholas Hugh Smith (born 1962) is an Australian philosopher and Honorary Professor of Philosophy at Macquarie University. Smith is known for his research on hermeneutics, political philosophy and Charles Taylor's thought.

== Books ==
- Strong Hermeneutics: Contingency and Moral Identity, Routledge 1997, ISBN 9780415164313
- Charles Taylor: Meaning, Morals and Modernity, Polity 2002, ISBN 9780745615752
- Critique Today, edited with Jean-Philippe Deranty, Robert Sinnerbrink, and Peter Schmiedgen, Brill 2006
- New Philosophies of Labour: Work and the Social Bond, edited with Jean-Philippe Deranty, Brill 2011, ISBN 9789004215467
- Recognition Theory as Social Research: Investigating the Dynamics of Social Conflict, co-edited with Shane O'Neill, Palgrave Macmillan 2012
- Perspectives on the Philosophy of Charles Taylor, co-edited with Arto Laitinen, Helsinki, Acta Philosophica Fennica, vol. 71, 2002
- Reading McDowell: On Mind and World, Routledge 2002.
