= D. G. Leahy =

D. G. Leahy (March 20, 1937 – August 7, 2014) was an American philosopher and philosophical theologian, called by Thomas J. J. Altizer "our most radical and comprehensive postmodern thinker." His books include Novitas Mundi: Perception of the History of Being, Foundation: Matter the Body Itself, Faith and Philosophy: The Historical Impact, and Beyond Sovereignty: A New Global Ethics and Morality.

He was tenured in Classics at New York University, where he received the Lindback Foundation Award for distinguished teaching. He later taught in the Religious Studies program at NYU and was appointed for a three-year term as Distinguished Visiting Professor of Philosophy at Loyola University Maryland.

He founded The New York Philosophy Corporation in 2003, where he taught courses on the history of philosophy and theology until a year before his death.

== Works ==
=== Books ===
- Novitas Mundi: Perception of the History of Being (New York: New York University Press, 1980; reprint, Albany: SUNY, 1994).
- Foundation: Matter the Body Itself (Albany: SUNY, 1996).
- Faith and Philosophy: The Historical Impact (Ashgate, 2003)
- The Cube Unlike All Others (2010).
- Beyond Sovereignty: A New Global Ethics and Morality (Aurora, CO: Davies Group, 2010).

=== Essays ===
- "To Create the Absolute Edge," Journal of the American Academy of Religion 57.4 (1989): 773–89.
- "The New Beginning: Beyond the Post-Modern Nothingness," Journal of the American Academy of Religion 62.2 (1994): 403–33.
- "Cuspidal Limits on Infinity: Secret of the Incarnate Self in Levinas," in Rending the Veil, ed. Elliot R. Wolfson (New York: Seven Bridges Press, 1999), 209–48.
- "The Diachrony of the Infinite in Altizer and Levinas," in Thinking through the Death of God, ed. Lissa McCullough and Brian Schroeder (Albany: State University of New York Press, 2004), 105–24.

=== Co-authored medical articles ===
- S. B. Hoath and D. G. Leahy, "Formation and Function of the Stratum Corneum," in The Essential Stratum Corneum, eds. Ronald Marks, Jean-Luc Leveque, Rainer Voegeli (London: Martin Dunitz Ltd., 2002): 31–40.
- Steven B. Hoath and D. G. Leahy, "The Organization of Human Epidermis: Functional Epidermal Units and Phi Proportionality," Journal of Investigative Dermatology 121.6 (2003): 1440–46.
- Steven B. Hoath and D. G. Leahy, "The Human Stratum Corneum as Extended, Covalently Cross-Linked Biopolymer: Mathematics, Molecules, and Medicine," Medical Hypotheses 66.6 (2006): 1191–98.

== Video interviews and website ==
- D. G. Leahy interviewed on his philosophical thinking by Todd Carter, March 19, 2014: Part 1 (1:52), Part 2(1:21), Part 3 (1:14).
- D. G. Leahy website: http://dgleahy.com

== Critical responses ==
- Altizer, Thomas J. J. "D. G. Leahy," in The Routledge Encyclopedia of Postmodernism, ed. Victor E. Taylor and Charles E. Winquist. London: Routledge, 2000.
- ———. "Appendix: D. G. Leahy and the Apocalyptic Trinity," in Altizer, The Apocalyptic Trinity. New York: Palgrave Macmillan, 2012, 151–70.
- ———. Review of Leahy, Foundation: Matter the Body Itself, in International Studies in Philosophy (2004).
- ———. Review of Leahy, Novitas Mundi: Perception of the History of Being, in Religious Studies Review 11.4 (Oct 1985): 350–52.
- Oakes, Edward T. "Exposed Being," essay review of Leahy, Foundation: Matter the Body Itself, in Journal of Religion 78.2 (April 1998): 246–56.
- Scharlemann, Robert P. Review of Leahy, Novitas Mundi: Perception of the History of Being, in Religious Studies Review 11.4 (Oct 1985): 350–52.
