= Türker Armaner =

Writer, philosopher, and translator

Türker Armaner (born April 7, 1968, in Istanbul) is an Istanbul-based writer, philosopher, and translator. He studied at the universities of Hacettepe, Boğaziçi, and Bergen and took his PhD degree in 2002 at Paris 8 University (Saint Denis) His first story was published on Hayalet Gemi (Phantom Ship) in 1995. His first book, Kıyısız (Shoreless), was published in 1997, his second book, Taş Hücre (Stone Cell), in 2000, his third book, Dalgakıran (Breakwater), in 2003, his novel, Tahta Saplı Bıçak (Wooden Hilted Knife) in 2007 and his last book, a philosophical inquiry, Tarih ve Temsil (History and Representation) in 2014. He is currently teaching at the Department of Philosophy at Galatasaray University, Istanbul, as an associate professor. He also is an editor at various publications in Istanbul, in addition to having many articles published in several journals.
