= W. D. Wright =

American academic

Dr. W. D. Wright (born 1936) is a professor emeritus of history at Southern Connecticut State University and the author of seven books on race and racism.

He earned a Ph.D. from State University of New York at Buffalo where he was influenced by W. E. B. Du Bois, referring to himself as a Du Boisian historical sociologist. He later published his dissertation "The Socialist Analysis of W. E. B. Du Bois."

== Early years ==
Wright, born 1936, was raised during the depression in Michigan City, Indiana, as one of eight children. His father, Charles Noble Wright, worked as a riveter for the Pullman Train Company. His mother, Harriet Elizabeth Wright, was the first black female to graduate high school in Michigan City, Indiana. Wright's great-grandmother, Elizabeth Downey, was a slave until the age of 12 in Virginia, when she was emancipated under the Emancipation Proclamation in approximately 1863.

Wright, was one of the first black men to play varsity basketball in Michigan City, Indiana. He earned a basketball scholarship at the University of Michigan.

Wright was a childhood friend of Richard G. Hatcher, the first black mayor in Indiana. Hatcher often delivered speeches alongside Martin Luther King Jr., Robert F. Kennedy, the Rev. Jesse Jackson, and other historic proponents of the civil rights movement.

== Racism in America ==
Wright contends that historians and intellectuals have failed to understand the difference between race and racism, which has in turn impaired their ability to understand who Black people are in America. He argues that Black Americans are to be distinguished from other categories of black people in the country: black Africans, West Indians, or Hispanics. While Black people are members of the black race, as are other groups of people, they are a distinct ethnic group of that race. This conceptual failure has hampered the ability of historians to define Black experience in America and to study it in the most accurate, authentic, and realistic manner possible.

Wright lectures often about how white people have been affected by their own racism and how it impacts upon relations between blacks and whites and the United States. He asserts that since the late 17th century, most Whites have been affected by their own racism, as evidenced by considerable delusional thinking, dehumanization, and alienation from America. White people have created and maintained a White racist America, which is the antithesis of liberty, equality, justice, and freedom; Black people continue to be the primary victims of this culture.

== The Black experience ==
Wright describes the Black experience in America as reflecting some of the richest dimensions of the human experience and human existence and also some of its most oppressive and wretched realities. Black people are a people "up from slavery" who survived slavery, developed during slavery, and developed after slavery-all great historical achievements.

Today there are many Black intellectuals who do not think of Black people as a people and have no wish to do so. They think of themselves as individuals and look upon Blacks that way as well. And this idea is espoused by more people than just the Black conservatives, although they have made a fetish of this kind of conception and Black social response in America. Black intellectuals are mainly from the Black middle-class ... [which] has lost—if it has not abandoned altogether—its historical mission, which was to help Black people as a people, as well as Black individuals, to advance and to be free in America.

— W.D. Wright, excerpt from Crisis Of The Black Intellectual

== Published works ==
Books

- The Wizard of Tuskegee: Booker T. Washington and the Revolutionary Modernization of Black America (2025)
- W.E.B. Du Bois The Souls of Black Folk and Black Double Consciousness (2025)
- The American Three-Party System: Hidden in Plain Sight (2012)
- Crisis of the Black Intellectual (2007)
- Critical Reflections on Black History (2002)
- Black History and Black Identity (2002)
- Racism Matters (1998)
- Black Intellectuals, Black Cognition and a Black Aesthetic (1997)
- The Socialist Analysis of W. E. B. Du Bois (1985)
- Historians and Slavery: A critical analysis of 'Perspectives and Irony in American Slavery' and other recent works (1978)

Journal articles

- "Black Financial and Economic Power: An Idea Whose Time Has Come." Black History Magazine (1996).
- "The Faces of Racism." Western Journal of Black Studies 11:4 (1987): 168–76.
- "On the Need for Other Kinds of Black Scholars." Hantu (Summer 1987).
- "Du Bois's Theory of Political Democracy." The Crisis 85:3 (March 1978): 85–89.
- "The Thought and Leadership of Kelly Miller." Phylon 39:2 (1978): 180–92.
- "Richard Hofstadter: Critic of History and Progenitor of Consensus." Connecticut Review 8:2 (April 1975): 25–36.
- "The Cultural Thought and Leadership of Alain Locke." Freedomways 14:1 (First Quarter 1974): 35–50.

Pamphlet

- A. Philip Randolph and the Triumph of the Pullman Porters and Maids Chicago: Pullman Company Museum, 1995.
