= Ajume Wingo =

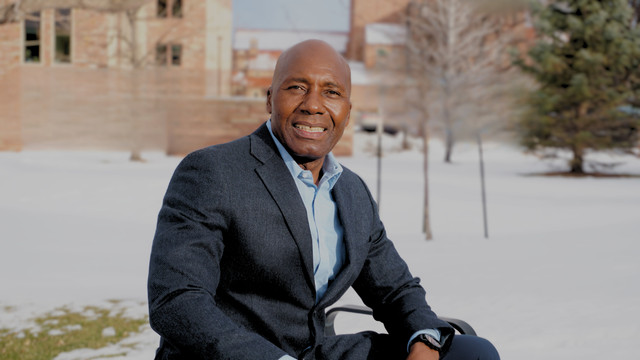

Ajume Wingo is a Cameroonian political and social philosopher currently serving as an associate professor at the University of Colorado at Boulder. Born into the Nso Royal Family in the North West Region of Cameroon, his title of Shey Ntumfon (Emissary of the Fon) reflects his role in overseeing non-Nso organizations that benefit the Nso community.

== Background ==
Hailing from Nso, a kingdom located in the North West Province of Cameroon, Ajume Wingo is a member of the Nso Royal Family. His title Shey Ntumfon (Emissary of the Fon (or King)) charges him with oversight of non-Nso organizations and institutions that enhance the interests of the people of Nso in Cameroon and worldwide. Wingo received much of his early education from Christian and Muslim missionaries, and from a Bedouin teacher (whose title of Mallam Gargari translates to "invincible teacher") known for his toughness and draconian style of discipline.

He later attended Cameroon College of Arts, Science and Technology (CCAST) Bambili where he studied history, economics and geography and the University of Yaounde where he studied law and economics. Upon emigrating to the United States, he obtained his bachelor's degree from the University of California Berkeley, and received his master's degree and PhD from the University of Wisconsin Madison.

In May 2024, Ajume Wingo received the 2024 Thomas Jefferson University Prize.Culture Le professeur camerounais Ajume Wingo récompensé par le prix américain Thomas Jefferson

== Education ==
Wingo's early education was diverse, influenced by Christian and Muslim missionaries as well as a strict Bedouin teacher. He attended Cameroon College of Arts, Science and Technology (CCAST) Bambili, focusing on history, economics, and geography. He later studied law and economics at the University of Yaounde.

After emigrating to the United States, Wingo earned his bachelor's degree from the University of California Berkeley. He went on to complete both his Master's degree and PhD at the University of Wisconsin Madison.

== Career ==
Prior to his position at the University of Colorado at Boulder, Wingo held numerous distinguished positions:

- Fellow, Institute of Race and Social Division, Boston University
- Visiting Assistant Professor, Clark University and Emerson College
- Assistant and Associate Professor of Philosophy, Center for Democracy and Development, University of Massachusetts Boston
- Fellow, W.E.B. Du Bois Institute, Harvard University

At the University of Colorado at Boulder, Wingo teaches courses in political and social philosophy. He previously served as the director of the Center for Values and Social Policy.

== Philosophical Work ==
Wingo's research centers on the analysis of non-liberal or corrupt democratic states, with a particular emphasis on contemporary African states. His work often explores themes of African art, aesthetics, and culture, frequently contrasting them with Western practices. His key philosophical interests include:

- The nature of liberal democracy: Wingo examines the challenges of establishing and maintaining liberal democracies in non-Western contexts, particularly in Africa.
- Veil politics: This concept explores the use of secrecy, deception, and manipulation in liberal democratic states.
- African philosophy: Wingo contributes significantly to the understanding of African philosophical traditions, including the Akan philosophy of personhood.
- Aesthetics: His work analyzes the complex aesthetics of African art, exploring the concepts of hiding and revealing.

== Publications ==
Wingo is a prolific author of books, articles, and encyclopedia entries:

- Books
  - Veil Politics in Liberal Democratic States (2003, Cambridge University Press)
  - The Aesthetics of Freedom (2009, Palgrave Macmillan)
  - Africa at Crossroads: From Subject to Citizen (co-authored with Michael Kruse, 2005, Iride)
- Selected Articles
  - "The Odyssey of Human Rights: Reply to Diagne" (2010, Transition)
  - "To Love your Country as your Mother: Patriotism after 9/11" (2007, Theory and Research in Education)
  - "The Many Layered Aesthetics of African Art" (2004, in Kwasi Wiredu, ed., Companion to African Philosophy, Blackwell)
  - "African Art and the Aesthetics of Hiding and Revealing" (1998, British Journal of Aesthetics)
- Encyclopedia Entries
  - "Akan Philosophy of Personhood" (2007, Stanford Encyclopedia of Philosophy)

== Extended Bibliography ==
- The Joy in Living Together: Towards an Appreciation of Laughter (2006, Journal of Political Philosophy)
- Africa at Crossroads: From Subject to Citizen, co-authored with Michael Kruse (2005, Iride)
- Fellowship Associations as a Foundation for Liberal Democracy in Africa in Kwasi Wiredu, ed., Companion to African Philosophy (2004, Blackwell)
- What Makes Liberal Democrats Tick? The Role of Non-Rationality in Liberal Democratic Politics (2003, Politeia)
- Living Legitimacy: A New Approach to Good Government in Africa (2001, New England Journal of Public Policy)
- Good Government is Accountability, in Tedros Kiros, ed., Perspectives in African Politics (2001, Routledge)
- Civic Education: A New Proposal (1997, Studies in Philosophy and Education)
