= Robert Zimmer (philosopher) =

German philosopher (born 1953)

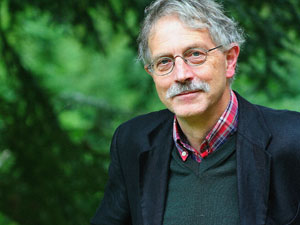
Robert Zimmer

Robert Zimmer (born 25 October 1953) is a German philosopher and essayist who writes biographies and popular introductions to philosophy and to the history of philosophy.

== Life and career ==
Robert Zimmer was born in Trier, West Germany on 25 October 1953. He was educated at the German universities of Saarbrücken and Düsseldorf and wrote his doctoral dissertation on Edmund Burke. From 1986 - 2013 he lived as a freelance writer and publicist in Berlin. In 2013 he moved to Stuttgart. His most popular book so far has been “Das Philosophenportal”, a collection of 16 essays on 16 different classical works of philosophy, which has been translated into more than a dozen languages (not yet in English). In 2010 he published a biography of Arthur Schopenhauer. He also translated a selection of essays by the 19th Century French critic and writer Charles Augustin Sainte-Beuve.

Zimmer is a follower of critical rationalism. Together with Martin Morgenstern he wrote a short and popular biography of Karl Popper and edited the correspondence between Popper and Hans Albert.

== Selected works ==
- 2011 (with M. Morgenstern) Gespräche mit Hans Albert
- 2010 Arthur Schopenhauer. Ein philosophischer Weltbürger
- 2009 Basis-Bibliothek Philosophie
- 2009 Das große Philosophenportal
- 2005 (ed., with M. Morgenstern) Hans Albert / Karl Popper: Briefwechsel
- 2004 Das Philosophenportal
- 2002 (with Martin Morgenstern) Karl Popper
- 1995 Edmund Burke zur Einführung
