= Carlos Fraenkel =

German-Brazilian scholar and writer

- Born: March 21, 1971 (age 55); Münster, Germany
- Education: Freie Universität Berlin, The Hebrew University
- Occupations: Professor of Philosophy and Religion

Carlos Fraenkel (born March 21, 1971, in Münster, Germany) is a German-Brazilian scholar and writer currently living in Canada. He is James McGill Professor of Philosophy and Religion at McGill University in Montreal and was previously Professor of Comparative Religion and Philosophy at Oxford University.

== Biography ==
Fraenkel's parents moved to Germany in 1970 as political refugees from the military dictatorship in Brazil. His paternal grandparents were German Jews who fled Nazi Germany and settled in São Paulo. His maternal grandfather is Joaquim Câmara Ferreira, a leader of Brazil's Communist Party, and, in the 1960s, of the armed resistance against Brazil's military dictatorship.

== Work ==
Fraenkel wrote his Ph.D. (summa cum laude, 2000) at the Freie Universität Berlin and the Hebrew University in Jerusalem. Fraenkel has held visiting professorships at LMU Munich, the École des Hautes Études en Sciences Sociales in Paris, and the State Islamic University in Makassar, Indonesia

Fraenkel's work spans ancient, medieval and early modern philosophy, Jewish and Islamic thought, and political philosophy. His research interests include Plato, Themistius, al-Fārābī, al-Ghazālī, Maimonides, and Spinoza, as well as conducting philosophical discussions in places of conflict, for example with Palestinian students, lapsed Hasidic Jews, and members of a Native American community. He has also contributed to the discussion of religious and cultural diversity.

== Bibliography ==
- From Maimonides to Samuel ibn Tibbon: The Transformation of the Dalālat al-Ḥāʾirīn into the Moreh ha-Nevukhim (Hebrew), The Hebrew University Magnes Press, Jerusalem 2007, ISBN 978-965-493-300-1.
- Philosophical Religions from Plato to Spinoza: Reason, Religion, and Autonomy. Cambridge University Press, Cambridge 2012, ISBN 978-1-139-85104-6.
- Teaching Plato in Palestine: Philosophy in a Divided World. Princeton University Press, Princeton 2015, ISBN 978-1-4008-6579-6.

== Awards and honors ==
- Sheikh Zayed Book Award in Arabic Culture in Other Languages 2016 (finalist)
- Mavis Gallant Prize for Non-Fiction 2015
