= Stephen D. John =

British philosopher

Stephen David John (born 1979) is a British philosopher. He is a Fellow of Pembroke College, Cambridge, and the University Hatton Professor in the Philosophy of Public Health. John is a member of the academic staff and lecturer in the Department of History and Philosophy of Science (HPS), his research focuses on the philosophy of science, political philosophy and the philosophy of public health.. His research also addresses issues such as trust in science, misinformation, and the ethical dimensions of public health policy, particularly in relation to risk, expertise, and decision-making in contemporary societies.

He obtained his BA, MPhil, and PhD from the University of Cambridge. His doctoral advisor was baroness Onora O'Neill. and his thesis title "Vulnerability, Health and Risk: towards a normative framework for public health policy".

Since 2012 he has been a Fellow of Pembroke College, and the University Hatton Professor in the Philosophy of Public Health. He is also a member of the Leverhulme Centre for the Future of Intelligence and of Cancer Research UK.
