= Lene Auestad =

Norwegian philosopher

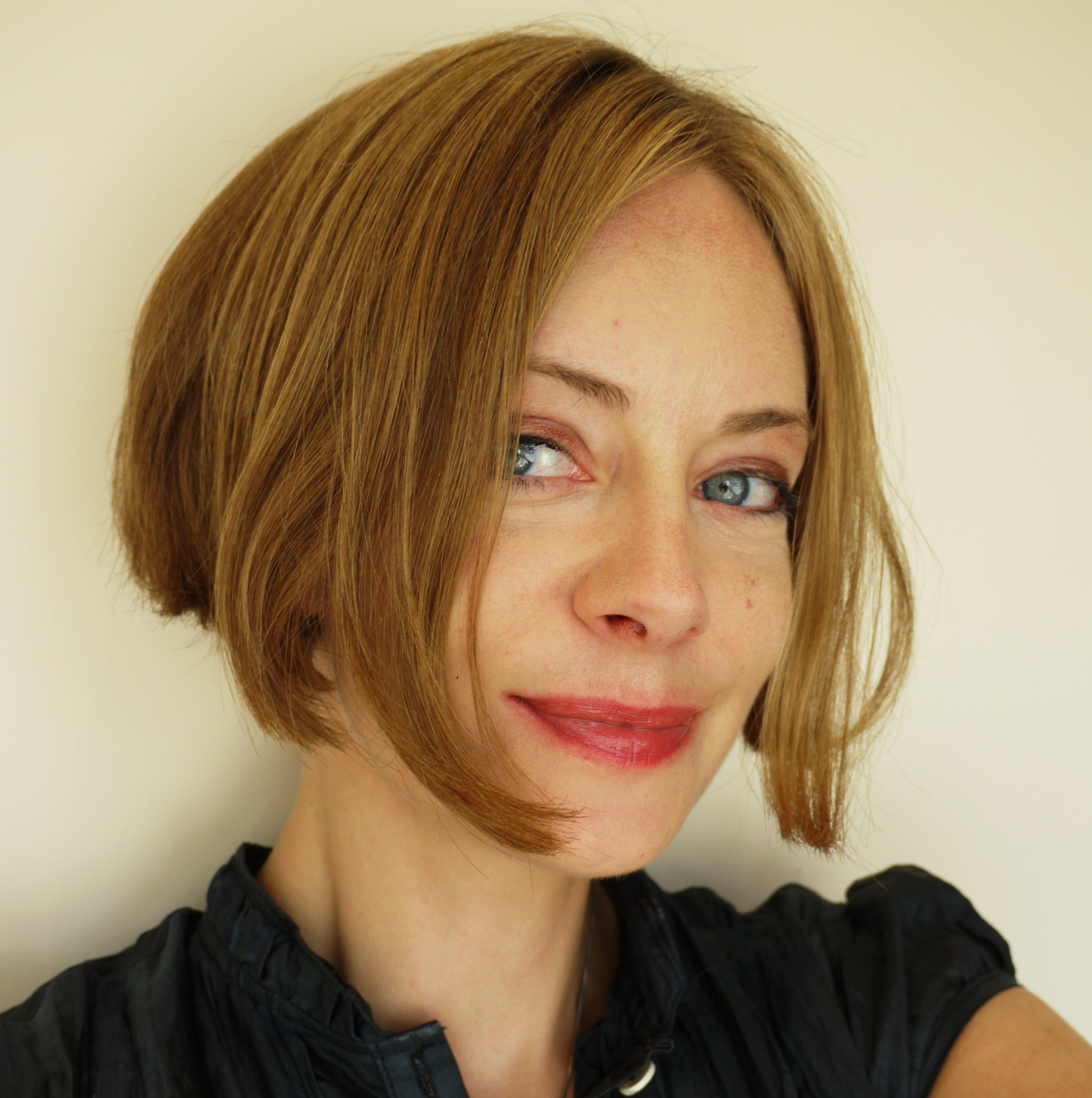

Lene Auestad (born 8 October 1973) is an author and a philosopher from the University of Oslo. She has written on the themes of prejudice, social exclusion and minority rights, and has contributed to public debates on hate speech.

== Career ==
Her book Respect, Plurality, and Prejudice combined critical theory with psychoanalysis and psychosocial studies, examining the underlying unconscious forces and structures that make up the phenomena of xenophobia, Antisemitism, Islamophobia, homophobia and sexism. It provides an overview of how social prejudices, and the discrimination and violence that often tend to accompany the latter, come into being. Moreover, It argues that in order to fully understand how a complex phenomenon such as prejudice works, we need to alter our traditional Western philosophical understanding of the subject as a supposedly fully rational, autonomous and individual agent. Auestad argues that we need a more situated and relational understanding of subjectivity and the subject, as prejudice and acts of discrimination always take place in a contextualized setting between subjects whose thoughts and actions influence each other.

Auestad has also written about the rise of nationalism in European countries, both in terms of its expression in extreme far-right groups and in the context of everyday political language and policy.

Auestad suggested that psychoanalysis can be used to think about the invisible and subtle processes of power over symbolic representation, for example, in the context of stereotyping and dehumanization, and posed the question of what forces govern the states of affairs that determine who is an 'I' and who is an 'it' in the public sphere.

She founded and runs the international and interdisciplinary conference series Psychoanalysis and Politics https://www.psa-pol.org, which aims to address how contemporary political issues may be analyzed through psychoanalytic theory and vice versa – how political phenomena may reflect back on psychoanalytic thinking. The series is interdisciplinary, inviting theoretical contributions and historical, literary or clinical case studies from philosophers, sociologists, psychoanalysts, psychotherapists, group analysts, literary theorists, historians, political scientists, politicians, political activists and others. Perspectives from different psychoanalytic schools are most welcome. Since 2010, conferences have been held in Barcelona, Budapest, Copenhagen, Helsinki, Lisbon, London, Oslo, Paris, Stockholm and Vienna, most often in the rooms of a friendly psychoanalytic society. One of the basic assumptions of the Conferences is that psychoanalysis does not have the luxury to ‘shut itself up’ and should recognize the cultural and political influence that the external world has on it.

== Books ==
- Rasisme, eksklusjon, mangfold - refleksjoner og intervensjoner (Racism, Exclusion, Diversity - Reflections and Interventions) (AMA forlag, Oslo, 2023)
- Traces of Violence and Freedom of Thought (co-edited with Amal Treacher Kabesh, Palgrave, 2017)
- Shared Traumas, Silent, Loss, Public and Private Mourning (Karnac, 2017)
- Respect, Plurality, and Prejudice: A Psychoanalytical and Philosophical Enquiry into the Dynamics of Social Exclusion and Discrimination (Karnac, 2015)
- Nationalism and the Body Politic: Psychoanalysis and the Rise of Ethnocentrism and Xenophobia (Karnac 2014)
- Psychoanalysis and Politics: Exclusion and the Politics of Representation (Karnac 2012)
- Handling, frihet, humanitet. Møter med Hannah Arendt (Action, Freedom, Humanity. Encounters with Hannah Arendt, co-edited with Helgard Mahrdt, Akademika, Trondheim, 2011)

== Select articles ==
- Auestad, Lene (1 December 2015). "Basic trust and alienation or "we have nothing to reproach ourselves with"". Psychoanalysis, Culture & Society. 20 (4): 326–342. doi:10.1057/pcs.2015.41.
- Auestad, Lene (1 December 2011). "Splitting, attachment and instrumental rationality. A re-view of Menzies Lyth's social criticism". Psychoanalysis, Culture & Society. 16 (4): 394–410. doi:10.1057/pcs.2010.33. S2CID 143622377.
- Auestad, Lene. "To Think or Not to Think : A Phenomenological and Psychoanalytic Perspective on Experience, Thinking and Creativity" (PDF). Revuecliopsy.fr.

== Translated books ==
Achille Mbembe, Nekropolitikk og andre essays. Oslo: Cappelen Damm Akademisk, 2021. (From English into Norwegian) Original titles: "Necropolitics", "Decolonizing the university", "Le puits aux fantasmes".

Sara Ahmed, Gledesdrepende essays. Oslo: Cappelen Damm Akademisk, 2021. (From English into Norwegian) Original titles: "Killing Joy: Feminism and the History of Happiness", "A phenomenology of whiteness", "Affective Economies"

Siri Gullestad/ Bjørn Killingmo, The Theory and Practice of Psychoanalytic Therapy. Listening to the Subtext. London/ New York: Routledge, 2019. (From Norwegian into English) Original title: Underteksten. Psykoanalytisk terapi i praksis. Oslo: Universitetsforlaget.

Hannah Arendt, Makt og vold. Tre essay. Oslo: Cappelen Damm Akademisk, 2017. (From English into Norwegian) Original titles: On Violence, "Mankind and terror", "Is America by Nature a Violent Society?"

== Interviews ==
In English: About the book, Respect, Plurality, and Prejudice, podcast on New Books in Psychoanalysis 11 September 2015

About hate speech: "Fierce online debate brings more prejudice" Alpha Galileo 13 September 2013

About the conference series Psychoanalysis and Politics "Introducing Psychoanalysis and Politics" in Journal of Psycho-Social Studies Volume 7 (1) 2013

in Swedish: •Lene Auestad, Iréne Matthis and Diana Mulinari: Vad ska vi med psykoanalysen till? (What do we need psychoanalysis for?) in the journal Fronesis, special issue on the psyche, (psyket)no.44-45 2013

in Spanish: Encuentro en la SEP del grupo Psychoalysis and Politics (The Spanish Psychoanalytical Society's encounter with Psychoanalysis and Politics) Interview with Lene Auestad and Jonathan Davidoff by the Spanish psychoanalysts Neri Daurella and Eileen Wieland, on the Spanish Society's webpages, (in Spanish)
