= Thomas Uebel =

Thomas Ernst Uebel (born 1952) is a philosopher of science, and professor of philosophy at the University of Manchester.

Uebel has held academic posts at Northwestern University, University of Pittsburgh, Technische Universität Berlin, University of Vienna and London School of Economics.

Uebel is a past president of the International Society for the History of Philosophy of Science.
