= Michael Brady (philosopher) =

British philosopher

Michael Sean Brady
- Born: 1965 (age 60–61)

Education
- Education: University of California at Santa Barbara (PhD); King's College London (MA); University of Liverpool (BA)

Philosophical work
- Era: 21st-century philosophy
- Region: Western philosophy
- School: Analytic philosophy
- Institutions: University of Glasgow
- Main interests: moral psychology, philosophy of emotions

Michael Sean Brady (born 1965) is a British philosopher and Professor of Philosophy at the University of Glasgow in Scotland. He is best known for his works on philosophy of emotions.

== Books ==
- Emotional Insight: The Epistemic Role of Emotional Experience, Oxford University Press, 2013, ISBN 9780199685523
- Emotion: The Basics, Routledge, 2018, ISBN 9781138081376
- Suffering and Virtue, Oxford University Press, 2018, ISBN 9780198812807

== See also ==
- Suffering
