= Michael Kremer (philosopher) =

American philosopher

Michael Kremer is an American philosopher who is known for his work in logic, philosophy of language and early analytic philosophy. He has published work on Bertrand Russell, Gottlob Frege, Ludwig Wittgenstein, and Gilbert Ryle. He is currently the Mary R. Morton Professor of Philosophy at the University of Chicago.
