= Volker Halbach =

German logician and philosopher

- Born: 21 October 1965 (age 60); Germany
- Education: Ludwig-Maximilians-Universität München, Università degli Studi di Firenze
- Occupations: Philosopher, logician
- Years active: 1991–present
- Website: www.philosophy.ox.ac.uk/people/volker-halbach

Volker Halbach (born 21 October 1965 in Ingolstadt, Germany) is a German logician and philosopher. His main research interests are in philosophical logic, philosophy of mathematics, philosophy of language, and epistemology, with a focus on formal theories of truth. He is Professor of Philosophy at the University of Oxford, Tutorial Fellow of New College, Oxford.

== Education and career ==
Volker Halbach's philosophical studies began at Ludwig-Maximilians-Universität München. He graduated in 1991 with an M.A. (Master of Arts) and in 1994 with a doctorate in philosophy (D.Phil., summa cum laude) with a dissertation titled "Tarski-Hierarchien". In 2001 he earned his habilitation with a thesis on "Semantics and Deflationism".

Halbach was an assistant professor at Universität Konstanz from 1997 to 2004.

In 2004, he took up a role at New College, University of Oxford, where he teaches logic-related courses including Introduction to Logic and Elements of Deductive Logic in the first year, Philosophical Logic, Formal Logic, Philosophy of Logic & Language, and Philosophy of Mathematics.

He served as vice-president of the British Logic Colloquium until 2022.

== Philosophical work ==
Halbach is the author of several articles and books including The Logic Manual, a textbook on undergraduate logic, and Axiomatic Theories of Truth.
