= Fish intelligence =

Intellectual capacity of fish

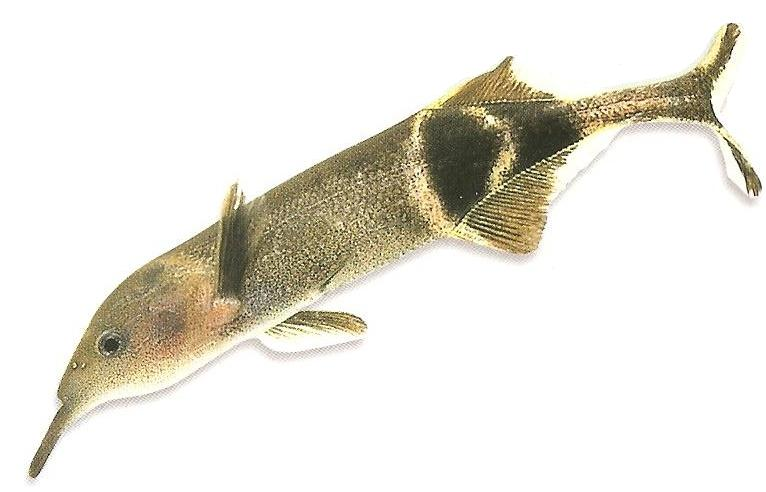
The elephantnose fish has the highest brain-to-body oxygen consumption ratio of all known vertebrates

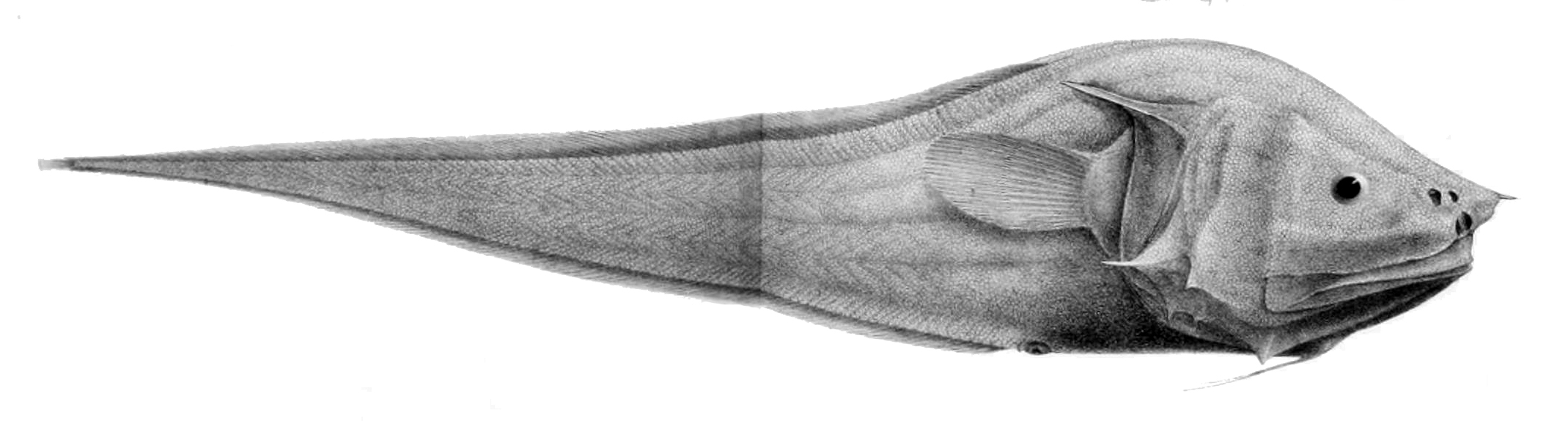
The bony-eared assfish may have the smallest brain-to-body weight ratio of all known vertebrates

Fish intelligence is "the result of the process of acquiring, storing in memory, retrieving, combining, comparing, and using in new contexts information and conceptual skills" as it applies to fish. Due to a common perception amongst researchers that teleosts are "primitive" compared to mammals and birds, there has been much less research into fish cognition than into those types of animals, and much remains unknown about fish cognition, though evidence of complex navigational skills such as cognitive maps is increasing.

Compared to similarly sized fish, mammals and birds typically have brain sizes fifteen times larger, though some species of fish such as elephantnose fish have very large brain-to-body ratios. However, fish still display intelligence that cannot be explained through Pavlovian and operant conditioning, such as reversal learning, novel obstacle avoidance, and passing simultaneous two-choice tasks. Some fish also match mammals and birds in the executive functioning capability of inhibitory motor control. Australian biologist Culum Brown has argued that fish may give the appearance of being less intelligent than they are due to differences between aquatic and terrestrial environments.

Fish hold records for the relative brain weights of vertebrates. Most vertebrate species have similar brain-to-body mass ratios. The deep sea bathypelagic bony-eared assfish has the smallest ratio of all known vertebrates. At the other extreme, as mentioned above, the electrogenic elephantnose fish, an African freshwater fish, has one of the largest brain-to-body weight ratios of all known vertebrates (slightly higher than humans) and the highest brain-to-body oxygen consumption ratio of all known vertebrates (three times that for humans).

== Brain ==
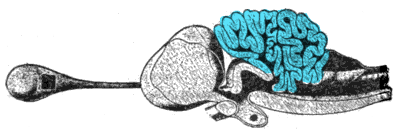
Cross-section of the brain of a porbeagle shark, with the cerebellum highlighted

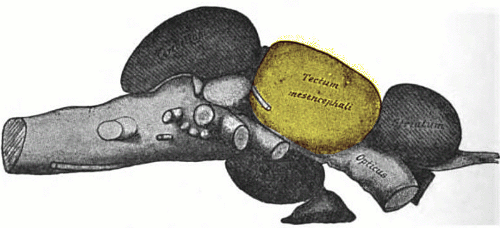
The brain of a cod

Fish typically have quite small brains relative to body size compared with other vertebrates, typically one-fifteenth the brain mass of a similarly sized bird or mammal. However, some fish have relatively large brains, most notably mormyrids and sharks, which have brains about as massive relative to body weight as birds and marsupials.

The cerebellum of cartilaginous and bony fishes is large and complex. In at least one important respect, it differs in internal structure from the mammalian cerebellum: The fish cerebellum does not contain discrete deep cerebellar nuclei. Instead, the primary targets of Purkinje cells are a distinct type of cell distributed across the cerebellar cortex, a type not seen in mammals. The circuits in the cerebellum are similar across all classes of vertebrates, including fish, reptiles, birds, and mammals. There is also an analogous brain structure in cephalopods with well-developed brains, such as octopuses. This has been taken as evidence that the cerebellum performs functions important to all animal species with a brain.

In mormyrid fish (a family of weakly electrosensitive freshwater fish), the cerebellum is considerably larger than the rest of the brain put together. The largest part of it is a special structure called the valvula, which has an unusually regular architecture and receives much of its input from the electrosensory system.

== Memory ==
Individual carp captured by anglers have been shown to become less catchable thereafter. This suggests that fish use their memory of negative experiences to associate capture with stress and therefore become less easy to catch. This type of associative learning has also been shown in paradise fish (Macropodus opercularis) which avoid places where they have experienced a single attack by a predator and continue to avoid for many months.

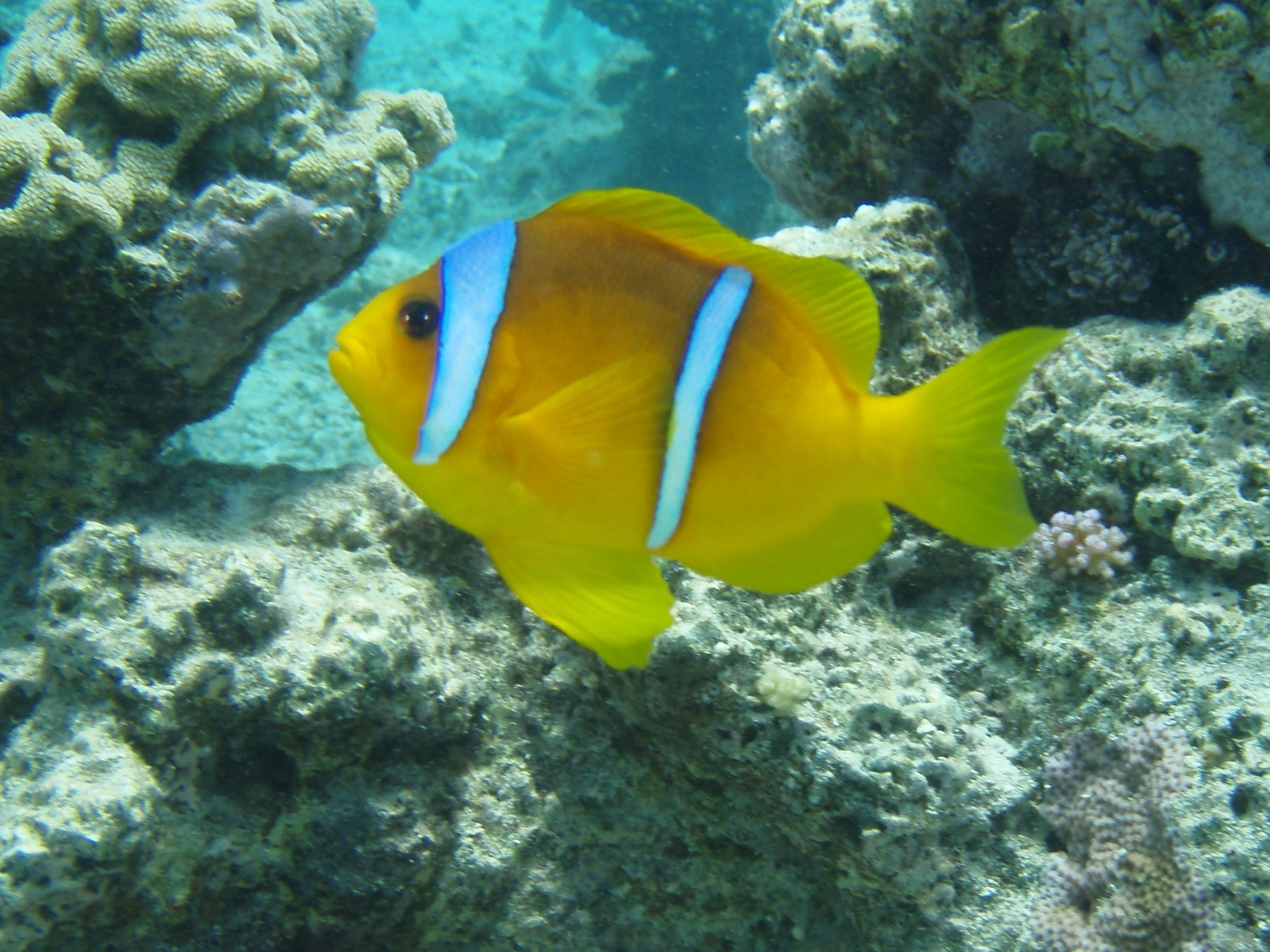
Red Sea clownfish can recognize their mate after 30 days separation.

A number of studies have shown that fish can retain information for months or years. Anecdotally, channel catfish (Ictalurus punctatus) can remember the human voice call announcing food five years after last hearing that call. Goldfish remember the colour of a tube dispensing food one year after the last tube presentation. Sockeye salmon still react to a light signal that precedes food arrival up to eight months since the last reinforcement. Some common rudd and European chub could remember the person who trained them to feed from the hand, even after a 6-month break. Crimson-spotted rainbowfish can learn how to escape from a trawl by swimming through a small hole in the center and they remember this technique 11 months later. Rainbow trout can be trained to press a bar to get food, and they remember this three months after last seeing the bar. Red Sea clownfish can recognize their mate 30 days after it was experimentally removed from the home anemone.

Several fish species are capable of learning complex spatial relationships and forming cognitive maps. They can orient themselves using multiple landmarks or symbols and they are able to integrate experiences which enable them to generate appropriate avoidance responses. In 2020, a neurological study using wireless neural recording systems measured the neurological activity of goldfish and found strong evidence supporting the idea that fish form navigational cognitive maps.

== Tool-like behavior ==
Video of an archerfish shooting at prey

Tool use is sometimes considered as an indication of intelligence in animals. There are few examples of tool use in fishes, perhaps because they have only their mouth in which to hold objects.

Several species of wrasse hold bivalves (scallops and clams) or sea urchins in their mouth and smash them against the surface of a rock (an "anvil") to break them up. This behaviour in an orange-dotted tuskfish (Choerodon anchorago) has been filmed; the fish fans sand to unearth the bivalve, takes it into its mouth, swims several metres to a rock which it uses as an anvil by smashing the mollusc apart with sideward thrashes of the head.

Archerfish (family Toxotidae) squirt jets of water at insects on plants above the surface to knock them into the water. They can adjust the size of the squirts to the size of the insect prey. They can even learn to shoot at moving targets.

Whitetail damselfish clean the rock face where they intend to lay eggs by sucking up and blowing sand grains onto the surface. Triggerfish blow water at sea urchins to turn them over, thereby exposing their more vulnerable underside. River stingrays create water currents with their fins to suck food out of a PVC pipe. Banded acaras (Bujurquina vittata) lay their eggs on a loose leaf and carry the leaf away when a predator approaches.

In one laboratory study, Atlantic cod (Gadus morhua) given access to an operant feeding machine learned to pull a string to get food. The researchers had also tagged the fish by threading a bead in front of their dorsal fin. Some fish snagged the string with their bead, resulting in food delivery. These fish eventually learned to swim in a particular way to repeatedly make the bead snag the string and get food. Because the fish used an object external to their body in a goal-oriented way, this satisfies some definitions of tool use - though in a more rudimentary fashion, a human blowing air wouldn't qualify as tool usage just like a fish using water in the same fashion, or even in the case of certain wrasse, the bivalve is not a tool but the prey itself. If the wrasse had used a rock to access the bivalve, then it would fall under that classification. There appear to be very few to no observed behaviors of fish using tools in a fashion similar to humans, but instead altering water flows in ways that benefits their survival.

== Construction ==
As for tool use, construction behaviour may be mostly innate. Yet it can be sophisticated, and the fact that fish can make judicious repairs to their creation suggests intelligence. Construction methods in fishes can be divided into three categories: excavations, pile-ups, and gluing.

Excavations may be simple depressions dug up in the substrate, such as the nests of bowfin, smallmouth bass, and Pacific salmon, but it can also consist of fairly large burrows used for shelter and for nesting. Burrowing species include the mudskippers, the red band-fish (Cepola rubescens) (burrows up to 1 m deep, often with a side branch), the yellowhead jawfish (Opistognathus aurifrons) (chambers up to 22 cm deep, lined with coral fragments to solidify it), the convict blenny (Pholidichthys leucotaenia), whose burrow is a maze of tunnels and chambers thought to be as much as 6 m long, and the Nicaragua cichlid (Hypsophrys nicaraguensis), who drills a tunnel by spinning inside of it. In the case of the mudskippers, the burrows are shaped like a J and can be as much as 2 m deep. Two species, the giant mudskipper (Periophthalmodon schlosseri) and the walking goby (Scartelaos histophorus), build a special chamber at the bottom of their burrows into which they carry mouthfuls of air. Once released the air accumulates at the top of the chamber and forms a reserve from which the fish can breathe – like all amphibious fishes, mudskippers are good air breathers. If researchers experimentally extract air from the special chambers, the fish diligently replenish it. The significance of this behaviour stems from the facts that at high tide, when water covers the mudflats, the fish stay in their burrow to avoid predators, and water inside the confined burrow is often poorly oxygenated. At such times these air-breathing fishes can tap into the air reserve of their special chambers.

Mounds are easy to build, but can be quite extensive. In North American streams, the male cutlip minnow Exoglossum maxillingua, 90–115 mm (3.5–4.5 in) long, assembles mounds that are 75–150 mm (3.0–5.9 in) high, 30–45 cm (12–18 in) in diameter, made up of more than 300 pebbles 13–19 mm in diameter (a quarter to half an inch). The fish carry these pebbles one by one in their mouths, sometimes stealing some from the mounds of other males. The females deposit their eggs on the upstream slope of the mounds, and the males cover these eggs with more pebbles. Males of the hornyhead chub Nocomis biguttatus, 90 mm (3.5 in) long, and of the river chub Nocomis micropogon, 100 mm (3.9 in) long, also build mounds during the reproductive season. They start by clearing a slight depression in the substrate, which they overfill with up to 10,000 pebbles until the mounds are 60–90 cm (2.0–3.0 ft) long (in the direction of the water current), 30–90 cm (0.98–2.95 ft) wide, and 5–15 cm (2.0–5.9 in) high. Females lay their eggs among those pebbles. The stone accumulation is free of sand and it exposes the eggs to a good water current that supplies oxygen. Males of many mouthbrooding cichlid species in Lake Malawi and Lake Tanganyika build sand cones that are flattened or crater-shaped at the top. Some of these mounds can be 3 m in diameter and 40 cm high. The mounds serve to impress females or to allow species recognition during courtship.

Male pufferfish, Torquigener sp., also build sand mounds to attract females. The mounds, up to 2 m in diameter, are intricate with radiating ridges and valleys.

Several species build up mounds of coral pieces either to protect the entrance to their burrows, as in tilefishes and gobies of the genus Valenciennea, or to protect the patch of sand in which they will bury themselves for the night, as in the Jordan's tuskfish Choerodon jordani and the rockmover wrasse Novaculichthys taeniourus.

Male sticklebacks are well known for their habit of building an enclosed nest made of pieces of vegetation glued together with secretions from their kidneys. Some of them adorn the entrance of the nest with unusually colored algae or even shiny tinfoil experimentally introduced in the environment.

Foam nests, made up of air bubbles glued together with mucus from the mouth, are also well known in gouramis and armoured catfish.

== Social intelligence ==
Fish can remember the attributes of other individuals, such as their competitive ability or past behavior, and modify their own behavior accordingly. For example, they can remember the identity of individuals to whom they have lost in a fight, and avoid these individuals in the future; or they can recognize territorial neighbors and show less aggression towards them as compared to strangers. They can recognize individuals in whose company they obtained less food in the past and preferentially associate with new partners in the future.

Fish can seem mindful of which individuals have watched them in the past. In an experiment with Siamese fighting fish, two males were made to fight each other while being watched by a female, whom the males could also see. The winner and the loser of the fight were then, separately, given a choice between spending time next to the watching female or to a new female. The winner courted both females equally, but the loser spent more time next to the new female, avoiding the watcher female. In this species, females prefer males they have seen win a fight over males they have seen losing, and it therefore makes sense for a male to prefer a female that has never seen him lose as opposed to a female that has seen him lose.

Social interactions also provides the context for a test of transitive inference, that is figuring out that if A > B and B > C, then A > C. In a study with the cichlid Astatotilapia burtoni, observer fish could watch aggressive interactions between pairs of other individuals. They witnessed individual A beat individual B, then individual B beat individual C, then C beat D, and D beat E. The observer fish were then given a choice of associating with either B or D (both of which they had seen win once and lose once). All eight observer fish tested spent more time next to D. Fish in this species prefer to associate with more subordinate individuals, so the preference for D showed that the observers had worked out that given that B was superior to C, and C to D, then D had to be subordinate to B.

== Deception ==
There are several examples of fish being deceptive, suggesting to some researchers that they may possess a theory of mind. However, most of the observations of deception can be understood as instinctive patterns of behavior that are triggered by specific environmental events, and they do not require a fish to understand the point of view of other individuals.

=== Distraction display ===
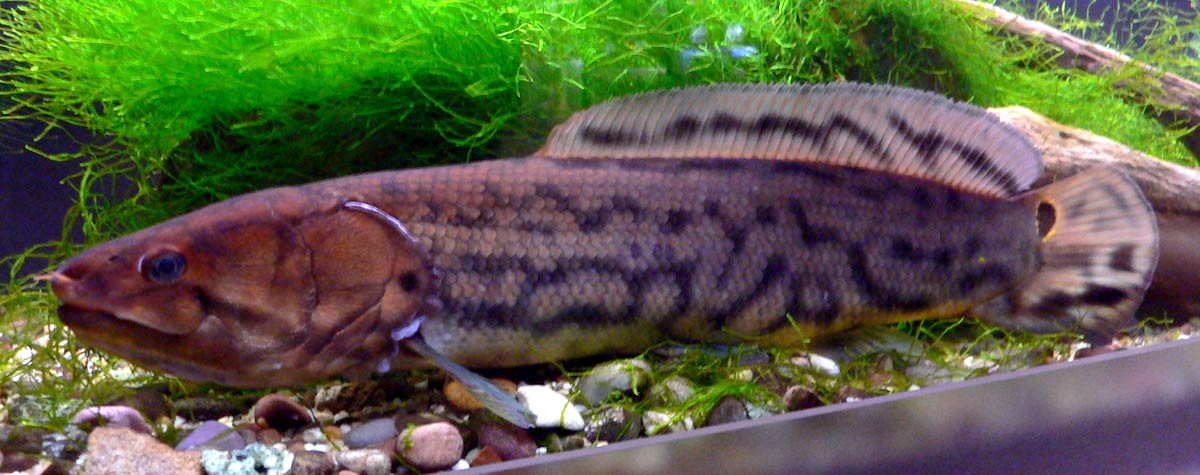
Adult male bowfins distract potential predators away from their fry by thrashing as if injured.

In the threespine stickleback (Gasterosteus aculeatus), males sometimes see their nest full of eggs fall prey to groups of marauding females; some males, when they see a group of females approaching, swim away from their nest and start poking their snout into the substrate, as would a female raiding a nest. This distraction display commonly fools the females into behaving as if a nest has been discovered there and they rush to that site, leaving the male's real nest alone. Bowfin (Amia calva) males caring for their free-swimming fry exhibit a related distraction display when a potential fry-predator approaches; they move away and thrash about as if injured, drawing the predator's attention toward himself.

=== False courtship behaviour ===
In the Malili Lakes of Sulawesi, Indonesia, one species of sailfin silverside (Telmatherina sarasinorum) is an egg predator. They often follow courting pairs of the closely related species T. antoniae. When those pairs lay eggs, T. sarasinorum darts in and eats the eggs. On four different occasions in the field (out of 136 observation bouts in total), a male T. sarasinorum who was following a pair of courting T. antoniae eventually chased off the male T. antoniae and took his place, courting the heterospecific female. That female released eggs, at which point the male darted to the eggs and ate them.

=== Death feigning ===
Death feigning as a way to attract prey is another form of deception. In Lake Malawi, the predatory cichlid Nimbochromis livingstonii have been seen first remaining stationary with their abdomen on or near sand and that then dropping onto their sides. In a variant behaviour, some N. livingstonii fell through the water column and landed onto their side. The fish then remained immobile for several minutes. Their colour pattern was blotchy and suggested a rotting carcass. Small inquisitive cichlids of other species often came near and they were suddenly attacked by the predator. About a third of the death-feigning performances led to an attack, and about one-sixth of the attacks were successful. Another African cichlid, Lamprologus lemairii, from Lake Tanganyika, has been reported to do the same thing. A South American cichlid, the yellowjacket cichlid Parachromis friedrichsthalii, also uses death feigning. They turn over onto their sides at the bottom of the sinkholes they inhabit and remain immobile for as long as 15 minutes, during which they attack the small mollies that come too close to them. The comb grouper Mycteroperca acutirostris may also be an actor, though in this case the behaviour should be called dying or illness feigning, rather than death feigning, because while lying on its side the fish occasionally undulates its body. In 1999, off the coast of southeastern Brazil, one juvenile comb grouper was observed using this tactic to catch five small prey in 15 minutes.

== Cooperation ==
Cooperative foraging reflects some mental flexibility and planning, and could therefore be interpreted as intelligence. There are a few examples in fishes.

Yellowtail amberjack can form packs of 7-15 individuals that maneuver in U-shaped formations to cut away the tail end of prey shoals (jack mackerels or Cortez grunts) and herd the downsized shoal next to seawalls where they proceed to capture the prey.

In the coral reefs of the Red Sea, roving coralgrouper that have spotted a small prey fish hiding in a crevice sometimes visit the sleeping hole of a giant moray and shake their head at the moray, and this seems to be an invitation to group hunting as the moray often swims away with the grouper, is led to the crevice where the prey hides, and proceeds to probe that crevice (which is too small to let the grouper in), either catching the prey by itself or flushing it into the open where the grouper grabs it. The closely related coral trout also enrolls the help of moray eels in this way, and they only do so when the prey they seek is hidden in crevices, where only the eel can flush them. They also quickly learn to invite preferentially those individual eels that collaborate most often.

Similarly, zebra lionfish that detect the presence of small prey fishes flare up their fins as an invitation to other zebra lionfish, or even to another species of lionfish (Pterois antennata), to join them in better cornering the prey and taking turns at striking the prey so that every individual hunter ends up with similar capture rates.

== Numeracy ==
Mosquitofish (Gambusia holbrooki) can distinguish between doors marked with either two or three geometric symbols, only one of which allows the fish to rejoin its shoalmates. This can be achieved when the two symbols have the same total surface area, density and brightness as the three symbols. Further studies have shown that this discrimination extends to 4 vs 8, 15 vs 30, 100 vs 200, 7 vs 14, and 8 vs 12 symbols, again controlling for non-numerical factors. Other species similarly trained with some measure of success include goldfish (discriminating between 2 vs. 3, and 10 vs. 15), guppy (3 vs. 4, and 4 vs. 5), and zebrafish (2 vs. 3, 3 vs. 4, and 4 vs. 5, but not 5 vs. 6, nor 6 vs. 7).

Many studies have shown that when given a choice, shoaling fish prefer to join the larger of two shoals. It has been argued that several aspects of such choice reflect an ability by fish to distinguish between numerical quantities. Mosquitofish can distinguish between shoals of 2 versus 3, or 4 versus 8, even when seeing and adding up members of each shoal one at a time.

A laboratory study with zebra mbuna and ocellate river stingray has demonstrated that these fish can add and subtract 'one' from 2, 3, or 4. The fish had to learn that if presented with, say, 3 yellow symbols, then in a subsequent choice test between 2 and 4 symbols they had to choose 2 to get a food reward (thus, yellow meant "choose one less"); but if presented with 3 blue symbols, then they had to choose 4 rather than 2 (thus, blue meant "choose one more"). The fish easily learned this task (the success criterion was 70% correct choice). Crucially, if after 3 yellow symbols they were given a choice between 1 and 2, they chose 2; conversely, if after 3 blue symbols the fish were given a choice between 4 or 5 symbols, they chose 4. This latter test showed that the fish had learned the concept of "one less" or "one more", and not simply "less" or "more".

== Social learning ==
Fish can learn how to perform a behavior simply by watching other individuals in action. This is variously called observational learning, cultural transmission, or social learning. For example, fish can learn a particular route after following an experienced leader a few times. One study trained guppies to swim through a hole marked in red while ignoring another one marked in green in order to get food on the other side of a partition; when these experienced fish ("demonstrators") were joined by a naive one (an "observer"), the observer followed the demonstrators through the red hole, and kept the habit once the demonstrators were removed, even when the green hole now allowed food access. In the wild, juvenile French grunt follow traditional migration routes, up to 1 km long, between their daytime resting sites and their nighttime foraging areas on coral reefs; if groups of 10-20 individuals are marked and then transplanted to new populations, they follow the residents along what is for them – the transplants – a new migration route, and if the residents are then removed two days later, the transplanted grunts continue to use the new route, as well as the resting and foraging sites at both ends.

Through cultural transmission, fishes could also learn where good food spots are. Ninespine stickleback, when given a choice between two food patches they have watched for a while, prefer the patch over which more fish have been seen foraging, or over which fish were seen feeding more intensively. Similarly, in a field experiment where Trinidadian guppies were given a choice between two distinctly marked feeders in their home rivers, the subjects chose the feeder where other guppies were already present, and in subsequent tests when both feeders were deserted, the subjects remembered the previously popular feeder and chose it.

Through social learning, fishes might learn not only where to get food, but also what to get and how to get it. Hatchery-raised salmon can be taught to quickly accept novel, live prey items similar to those they will encounter once they will be released in the wild, simply by watching an experienced salmon take such prey. The same is true of young perch. In the laboratory, juvenile European seabass can learn to push a lever in order to obtain food just by watching experienced individuals use the lever.

Fishes can also learn from others the identity of predatory species. Fathead minnows, for example, can learn the smell of a predatory pike just by being simultaneously exposed to that smell and the sight of experienced minnows reacting with fear, and brook stickleback can learn the visual identity of a predator by watching the fright reaction of experienced fathead minnows. Fish can also learn to recognize the odor of dangerous sites when they are simultaneously exposed to it and to other fish that suddenly show a fright reaction. Hatchery-raised salmon can learn the smell of a predator by being simultaneously exposed to it and to the alarm substance released by injured salmon.

== Latent learning ==
Latent learning is a form of learning that is not immediately expressed in an overt response; it occurs without any obvious reinforcement of the behaviour or associations that are learned. One example in fish comes from research with male three spot gouramis (Trichopodus trichopterus). This species quickly form dominance hierarchies. To appease dominants, subordinates adopt a typical body posture angled at 15-60º to the horizontal, all fins folded and pale body colors. Individuals trained to associate a light-stimulus with the imminent arrival of food exhibit this associative learning by approaching the surface where the food is normally dropped immediately after the light-stimulus is presented. However, if a subordinate is placed in a tank with a dominant individual and the light-stimulus is presented, the subordinate immediately assumes the submissive posture rather than approaching the surface. The subordinate has predicted that going to the surface to get food would place it in competition with the dominant, and to avoid potential aggression, it immediately attempts to appease the dominant.

== Cleaner fish ==
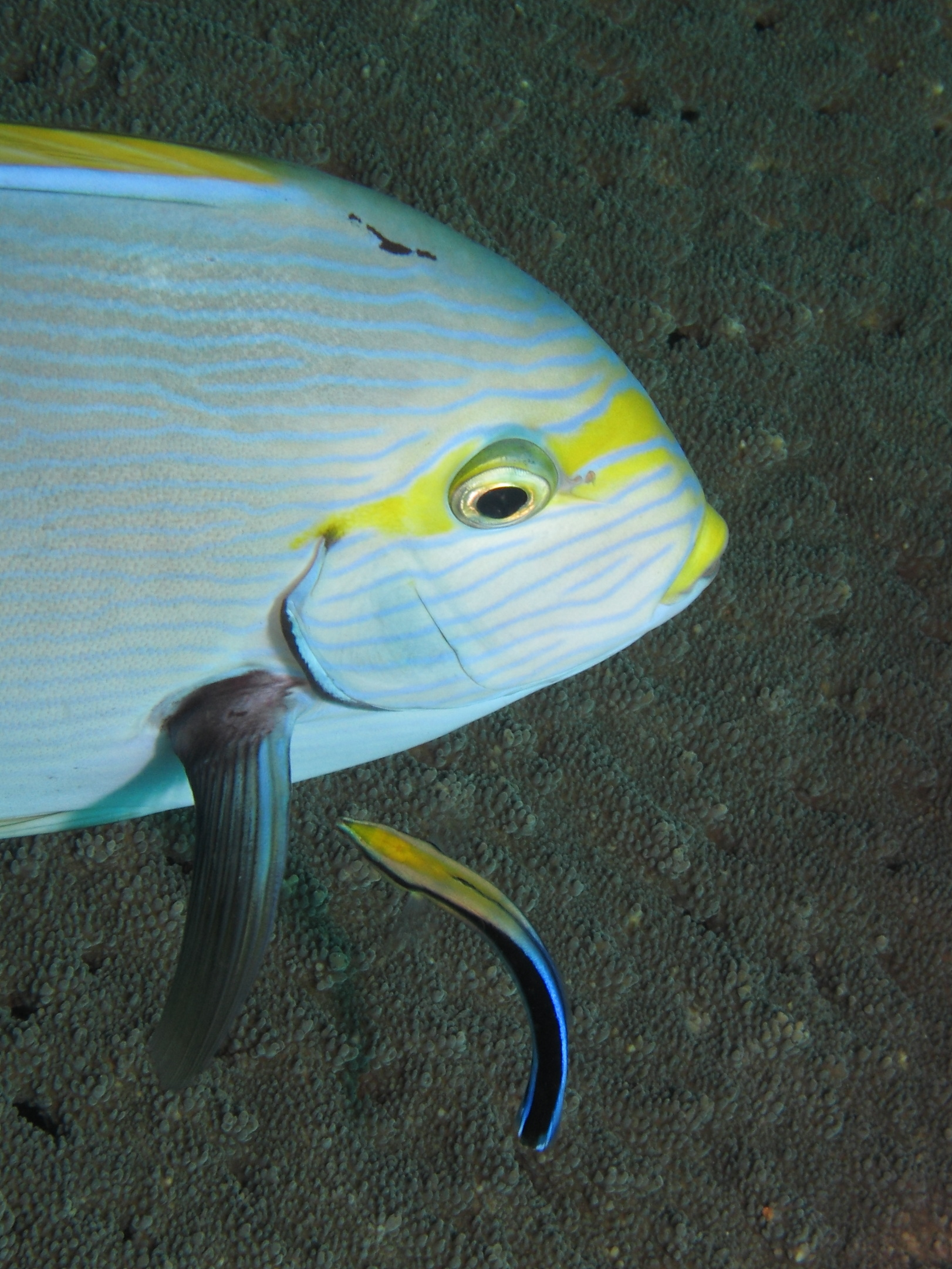
Bluestreak cleaner wrasse (bottom) with a client fish

The bluestreak cleaner wrasse (Labroides dimidiatus) performs a service for "client" fishes (belonging to other species) by removing and eating their ectoparasites. Clients can invite a cleaning session by adopting a typical posture or simply by remaining immobile near a wrasse's cleaning station. They can even form queues while doing so. But cleaning sessions do not always end up well, because wrasses (or wrasse-mimicking parasitic sabre-toothed blennies) may cheat and eat the nutritious body mucus of their clients, rather than just the ectoparasites, something that makes the client jolt and sometimes flee. This system has been the subject of extensive observations which have suggested cognitive abilities on the part of the cleaner wrasses and their clients. For example, clients refrain from soliciting a cleaning session if they have witnessed the cleaning session of the previous client ending badly. Cleaners give the impression of trying to maintain a good reputation, because they cheat less when they see a big audience (a long queue of clients) watching. Cleaners sometimes work as male-female teams, and when the smaller female cheats and bites the client, the larger male chases her off, as if to punish her for having tarnished their reputation.

== Mirror test ==
A 2019 study on bluestreak cleaner wrasses found they can successfully pass the mirror test. According to the authors, their findings mean that either prior conceptions of animal self-awareness or the validity of the mark test need to be reexamined. Gordon Gallup, the originator of the test, believes that the results are best explained by the fish having instincts to scrape off parasites. In 2022, a larger study was performed with positive results, but the fish only passed when the mark resembled a parasite. The authors then reiterated their conclusion that either self-awareness in animals or the validity of the mirror test as a method need to be reconsidered.

== Play ==
Play behaviour is often considered a correlate of intelligence. One possible example in fish is provided by the electrolocating Peters' elephantnose fish (mentioned above as having one of the largest brain-to-body weight ratios of all known vertebrates). One captive individual was observed carrying a small ball of aluminum foil to the outflow tube of the aquarium filter, letting the current push the ball away before chasing after it and repeating the behaviour. The same species has been reported trying to balance tubes vertically at the water surface until they fell, and then try again. Captive white-spotted cichlids have also been seen hitting a floating thermometer hundreds of times to make it wobble and bob.

== Food stocking ==
Food stocking can be viewed potentially as an animal planning for the future. One example of short-term stocking involves climbing perch (Anabas testudineus). Individuals were kept singly in aquaria and fed with pellets dropped at the surface. When the pellets were dropped one after the other at 1-s intervals, the fish took them as they reached the surface and stocked them inside the mouth. On average, the fish placed 7 pellets in their mouth before moving away to consume them. When starved for 24-h before the feeding test, they doubled the number of pellets stocked (14 on average); the underside of their heads bulged under the load. The behaviour may be an indication that competition for food is normally severe in this species and that any adaptation to secure food would be beneficial.

== See also ==
- Animal cognition
- Bird intelligence
- Cephalopod intelligence
- Cetacean intelligence
- Pain in fish
- Shoaling and schooling

== Further references ==
- Braithwaite, Victoria A (2005) "Cognitive ability in fish" Fish physiology, 24: 1–37.
- Brown C, Laland K and Krause J (Eds) (2011) Fish Cognition and Behavior John Wiley & Sons. ISBN 9781444342512.
- Brown C, Laland K and Krause J (2003) Learning in fishes: why are they smarter than you think? Fish and Fisheries, 4:197–288.
- Brown C and Laland K (2003) "Social learning in fishes: A review" Fish and Fisheries, 4(3), 280-288.
- Bshary R, Wickler W and Fricke H (2002) "Fish cognition: a primate's eye view". Animal Cognition, 5 (1): 1–13. doi:10.1007/s10071-001-0116-5
- Laland K, Brown C and Krause J (2003) "Learning in Fishes: An introduction" Fish and Fisheries, 4(3): 199-202.
- Reebs, Stephan (2001) Fish Behavior in the Aquarium and in the Wild. Cornell University Press. ISBN 0-8014-8772-2
- Schultz, Nora (2007) "When fish get emotional" New Scientist.
