= Steven P. Scalet =

American professor

- Born: United States
- Spouse: Debby
- Children: Sophia

Education
- Education: University of Arizona

Philosophical work
- Institutions: Yale Gordon College of Arts and Sciences, University of Baltimore
- Main interests: Corporate social responsibility (CSR); Ethics

Steven P. Scalet is associate professor for the Division of Legal, Ethical and Historical Studies at the Yale Gordon College of Arts and Sciences, University of Baltimore.

== Early life ==
Scalet gained his degree from the Franklin & Marshall College, he went on to the University of Arizona where he completed a master's degree in economics and, in 1999, his philosophy doctorate.

== Academic career ==
Scalet's teaching career began in 1999 when he became associate professor of philosophy and economics at Binghamton University, State University of New York (SUNY). As director of the Philosophy, Politics and Law (PPL), he helped to set up the PPL Institute which invites well known philosophers to the university's campus.

In 2009 Scalet took up his current position as associate professor for the Division of Legal, Ethical and Historical Studies at the Yale Gordon College of Arts and Sciences, University of Baltimore where he is also the director of interdisciplinary studies. He also delivers lectures for the New York Council for the Humanities on the subjects democracy and corporate responsibility.

== Honors ==
- 2003-2004 State University of New York (SUNY) Chancellor's Award for excellence in teaching
- 2007 Binghamton University Council/Foundation Award for commitment to the campus community

== Personal life ==
Scalet is married, to Debby, and they have a daughter, Sophia.

== Selected bibliography ==
=== Books ===
- Scalet, Steven (2009). Social philosophy and our changing points of view. Binghamton, N.Y: Global Academic Pub. ISBN 9781586842734.
- Scalet, Steven (2009). Justice and law. Binghamton, N.Y: Global Academic Pub. ISBN 9781586842727.
- Scalet, Steven P; Arthur, John (2009). Morality and moral controversies: readings in moral, social, and political philosophy. Upper Saddle River, N.J: Pearson Prentice Hall. ISBN 9780136031376.
- Scalet, Steven (2014). Markets, ethics, and business ethics. Boston: Pearson. ISBN 9780205785841.

=== Chapters in books ===
- Scalet, Steven P; Schmidtz, David (2009), "Famine, poverty, and property rights", in Morris, Christopher (ed.), Amartya Sen, Cambridge New York: Cambridge University Press, pp. 170–190, ISBN 9780521618069

=== Journal articles ===
- Scalet, Steven P. (2000). "Liberalism, Skepticism, and Neutrality: Making do Without Doubt". Liberalism. pp. 59–77. doi:10.1007/978-94-015-9440-0_4. ISBN 978-90-481-5591-0. S2CID 159059036.
- Scalet, Steven P. (January 2003). "Fitting the people they are meant to serve: reasonable persons in the American legal system". Law and Philosophy. 22 (1): 75–110. doi:10.1023/A:1022540824518. S2CID 142938099.
- Scalet, Steven P. (June 2006). "Prisoner's dilemmas, cooperative norms, and codes of business ethics". Journal of Business Ethics. 65 (4): 309–323. doi:10.1007/s10551-005-5356-x. S2CID 154268607.
- Scalet, Steven (May 2007). "Memorial Minutes: John Arthur (1946–2007)". American Philosophical Association. 80 (5).
- Scalet, Steven P.; Kelly, Thomas F. (June 2010). "CSR rating agencies: What is their global impact?". Journal of Business Ethics. 94 (1): 69–88. doi:10.1007/s10551-009-0250-6. S2CID 154716554.
