= David Schmidtz =

Canadian-American philosopher (born 1955)

- Born: 1955 (age 70–71)

Education
- Education: University of Saskatchewan; University of Arizona

Philosophical work
- Era: Contemporary philosophy
- Region: Western philosophy
- School: Libertarianism; Arizona School liberalism
- Main interests: Rational choice, game theory, political philosophy
- Notable ideas: Justice as a map, not a theory
- Website: www.davidschmidtz.com

David Schmidtz (/ʃmɪts/; born 1955) is a Canadian-American philosopher. He is Presidential Chair of Moral Science at West Virginia University's Chambers College of Business and Economics. He is also editor-in-chief of the journal Social Philosophy & Policy. Previously, he was Kendrick Professor of Philosophy and Eller Chair of Service-Dominant Logic at the University of Arizona. While at Arizona, he founded and served as inaugural head of the Department of Political Economy and Moral Science.

== Education and career ==
Schmidtz grew up in Humboldt, Saskatchewan, Canada. In 1983, he received his B.A. in philosophy from the University of Saskatchewan. He earned an M.A. in philosophy from the University of Arizona in 1985, and an M.A. in economics, also from the University of Arizona, in 1987. Schmidtz earned his PhD at the University of Arizona in 1988 under the direction of Allen Buchanan. He also studied with Joel Feinberg and Keith Lehrer, Holly Martin Smith, R. Mark Isaac, and Vernon Smith.

In 1988, Schmidtz took a job as an assistant professor at Yale University. He was promoted to associate professor in 1991. He left Yale in 1994, taught at Bowling Green State University, and joined the University of Arizona in 1995. He was promoted to Professor (of Philosophy, joint in Economics) in 1998.

Schmidtz taught first-year property as a visiting professor at Florida State University College of Law in 2007. In the 2014–15 academic year, he was a national Phi Beta Kappa Visiting Scholar and John Stuart Mill Professor at Hamburg University. Schmidtz is the founding director of the Freedom Center at the University of Arizona. Among his former doctoral students are Jason Brennan.

== Philosophical work ==
He is author of Elements of Justice, Rational Choice and Moral Agency, co-author of Social Welfare and Individual Responsibility (a "For & Against" book with Robert Goodin) and editor of a volume on Robert Nozick in the Cambridge University Press "Contemporary Philosophy in Focus" series. He also co-edited two editions of Environmental Ethics: What Really Matters, What Really Works with Elizabeth Willott (1955–2015); a third edition of this book with co-editor Dan Shahar was published in 2018. His first book, The Limits of Government: An Essay on the Public Goods Argument, combined his interests in moral philosophy and economic analysis. Schmidtz has also written on rational choice theory and environmental ethics.

He has published articles in many journals, including the Journal of Philosophy, Ethics, and Political Theory along with reviews in journals such as Philosophical Review, Canadian Journal of Philosophy, and Mind. Many of his essays have been (or are in the process of being) reprinted, and have been translated into other languages.

Thirteen of his essays (one previously unpublished, on Peter Singer's approach to moral theory) were published as Person, Polis, Planet: Essays in Applied Philosophy in 2008. A Brief History of Liberty, with co-author Jason Brennan, appeared in 2010. He co-authored the introductory textbook Commercial Society: A Primer on Ethics and Economics with Cathleen Johnson and Robert Lusch and the book Debating Education: Is There a Role for Markets? with Harry Brighouse, both published in 2020.

== Selected publications ==
=== Books ===
- Schmidtz, David (1991). The limits of government: an essay on the public goods argument. Boulder: Westview Press. ISBN 9780813308708. OCLC 22380961.
- Schmidtz, David (1995). Rational choice and moral agency. Princeton, NJ: Princeton University Press. ISBN 9780691029184. OCLC 30474060.
- Schmidtz, David; Goodin, Robert E. (1998). Social welfare and individual responsibility. For and against. Cambridge, UK; New York: Cambridge University Press. doi:10.1017/CBO9780511815508. ISBN 9780521564618. OCLC 38144477.
- Schmidtz, David, ed. (2002). Robert Nozick. Contemporary philosophy in focus. Cambridge, UK; New York: Cambridge University Press. ISBN 9780521782265. OCLC 46866414.
- Schmidtz, David (2006). Elements of justice. Cambridge, UK; New York: Cambridge University Press. doi:10.1017/CBO9780511817519. ISBN 9780521539364. OCLC 60189639.
- Schmidtz, David (2008). Person, polis, planet: essays in applied philosophy. Oxford; New York: Oxford University Press. ISBN 9780521539364. OCLC 177063142.
- Schmidtz, David; Brennan, Jason (2010). A brief history of liberty. Brief histories of philosophy. Chichester, UK; Malden, MA: Wiley-Blackwell. doi:10.1002/9781444318289. ISBN 9781405170796. OCLC 430736591.
- Schmidtz, David; Willott, Elizabeth, eds. (2012). Environmental ethics: what really matters, what really works (2nd ed.). Oxford; New York: Oxford University Press. ISBN 9780199793518. OCLC 746489205.
- Brennan, Jason; van der Vossen, Bas; Schmidtz, David, eds. (2017). The Routledge handbook of libertarianism. Routledge handbooks in philosophy. New York: Routledge. doi:10.4324/9781317486794. ISBN 9781138832169. OCLC 978902248.
- Schmidtz, David; Pavel, Carmen E., eds. (2018). The Oxford handbook of freedom. Oxford; New York: Oxford University Press. doi:10.1093/oxfordhb/9780199989423.001.0001. ISBN 9780199989423. OCLC 1028580625.
- Schmidtz, David; Shahar, Dan C., eds. (2018). Environmental ethics: what really matters, what really works (3rd ed.). Oxford; New York: Oxford University Press. ISBN 9780190259228. OCLC 1029060677.
- Johnson, Cathleen; Lusch, Robert F.; Schmidtz, David (2020). Commercial society: a primer on ethics and economics. Economy, polity, and society. London; Lanham, MD: Rowman & Littlefield. ISBN 9781786613561. OCLC 1104298783.
- Schmidtz, David; Brighouse, Harry (2020). Debating education: is there a role for markets?. Debating ethics. Oxford; New York: Oxford University Press. doi:10.1093/oso/9780199300945.001.0001. ISBN 9780199300952. OCLC 1099949826.
- Schmidtz, David (2023). Living Together: Inventing Moral Science. Oxford; New York: Oxford University Press. doi:10.1093/oso/9780197658505.001.0001. ISBN 9780197658505. OCLC 1338165537.

=== Articles and chapters ===
- Isaac, R. Mark; Schmidtz, David; Walker, James M. (September 1989). "The assurance problem in a laboratory market". Public Choice. 62 (3): 217–236. doi:10.1007/BF02337743. JSTOR 30025075. S2CID 154196866.
- Schmidtz, David (October 1990). "Justifying the state". Ethics. 101 (1): 89–102. doi:10.1086/293261. JSTOR 2381893. S2CID 170852106.
- Schmidtz, David (October 1990). "When is original appropriation required?". The Monist. 73 (4): 504–518. doi:10.5840/monist19907342. JSTOR 27903207.
- Schmidtz, David (September 1992). "Rationality within reason". The Journal of Philosophy. 89 (9): 445–466. doi:10.2307/2941111. JSTOR 2941111.
- Schmidtz, David (Winter 1993). "Reasons for altruism". Social Philosophy and Policy. 10 (1): 52–68. doi:10.1017/S0265052500004015. S2CID 145389376.
- Schmidtz, David (January 1994). "Choosing ends". Ethics. 104 (2): 226–251. doi:10.1086/293599. JSTOR 2381576. S2CID 222815868.
- Schmidtz, David (Summer 1994). "The institution of property". Social Philosophy and Policy. 11 (2): 42–62. doi:10.1017/S0265052500004428. S2CID 146201495.
- Schmidtz, David (1998). "Are all species equal?". Journal of Applied Philosophy. 15 (1): 57–67. doi:10.1111/1468-5930.00073. JSTOR 24354005.
- Schmidtz, David (2016) [1999]. "The meanings of life" ( (PDF)). In Benatar, David (ed.). Life, death, and meaning: key philosophical readings on the big questions (3rd ed.). Lanham, MD: Rowman & Littlefield. pp. 93–113. ISBN 9781442258310. OCLC 934937791. Archived from the original on 2020-08-11.
- Schmidtz, David (November 2000). "Islands in a sea of obligation: limits of the duty to rescue". Law and Philosophy. 19 (6): 683–705. doi:10.1023/A:1006450523387. JSTOR 3505071. S2CID 143279079.
- Schmidtz, David (October 2001). "A place for cost-benefit analysis". Philosophical Issues. 11 (1): 148–171. doi:10.1111/j.1758-2237.2001.tb00042.x. JSTOR 3050599.
- Schmidtz, David (December 2002). "How to deserve". Political Theory. 30 (6): 774–799. doi:10.1177/0090591702238203. JSTOR 3072566. S2CID 146183035.
- Scalet, Steven P.; Schmidtz, David (2009). "Famine, poverty, and property rights". In Morris, Christopher W. (ed.). Amartya Sen. Contemporary philosophy in focus. Cambridge, UK; New York: Cambridge University Press. pp. 170–190. doi:10.1017/CBO9780511800511.009. ISBN 9780521618069. OCLC 317068055.
- Schmidtz, David (January 2010). "Property and justice". Social Philosophy and Policy. 27 (1): 79–100. doi:10.1017/S0265052509990045. S2CID 145284633.
- Schmidtz, David (June 2011). "Respect for everything". Ethics, Policy & Environment. 14 (2): 127–138. doi:10.1080/21550085.2011.578359. S2CID 144887016. With commentaries by Robin Attfield, Thom Brooks, Greg Bognar, Martin Drenthen, Matt Ferkany, Kendy M. Hess, Dan C. Shahar, James P. Sterba, and Gary Varner.
- Schmidtz, David (July 2011). "Nonideal theory: what it is and what it needs to be". Ethics. 121 (4): 772–796. doi:10.1086/660816. JSTOR 10.1086/660816. S2CID 144510752. A review of Amartya Sen's The Idea of Justice.
- Zwolinski, Matt; Schmidtz, David (2013). "Environmental virtue ethics: what it is and what it needs to be". In Russell, Daniel C. (ed.). The Cambridge companion to virtue ethics. Cambridge, UK; New York: Cambridge University Press. pp. 221–239. doi:10.1017/cco9780511734786.011. ISBN 9781107001169. OCLC 801219079.
- Schmidtz, David (Fall 2016). "A realistic political ideal". Social Philosophy and Policy. 33 (1–2): 1–10. doi:10.1017/S0265052516000406.
- Schmidtz, David (2017). "Realistic idealism". In Blau, Adrian (ed.). Methods in analytical political theory. Cambridge, UK; New York: Cambridge University Press. pp. 131–152. doi:10.1017/9781316162576.009. ISBN 9781107098794. OCLC 972309027.
- Gaus, Gerald; Courtland, Shane D.; Schmidtz, David (January 22, 2018). "Liberalism". In Zalta, Edward N. (ed.). Stanford Encyclopedia of Philosophy (Spring 2018 ed.). ISSN 1095-5054. OCLC 429049174.
- Schmidtz, David (2019). "The ethics and economics of ecological justice". In White, Mark D. (ed.). The Oxford handbook of ethics and economics. Oxford handbooks. Oxford; New York: Oxford University Press. pp. 543–558. doi:10.1093/oxfordhb/9780198793991.013.26. ISBN 9780198793991. OCLC 1052875966.

== See also ==
- Canadian philosophy
- List of Canadian philosophers
- American philosophy
- List of American philosophers
