= Gerald Gaus =

American philosopher (1952–2020)

Gerald Francis "Jerry" Gaus (1952 – 19 August 2020) was an American philosopher and the founding editor of the academic journal Politics, Philosophy & Economics. His last academic post was as the James E. Rogers Professor of Philosophy at the University of Arizona. His books include Public Reason and Diversity: Reinterpretations of Liberalism (2022), The Open Society and Its Complexities (2021), The Tyranny of the Ideal: Justice in a Diverse Society (2016), The Order of Public Reason (2011), On Philosophy, Politics, and Economics (2008), Contemporary Theories of Liberalism (2003), Political Concepts and Political Theories (2000), Justificatory Liberalism (1996), Value and Justification: The Foundations of Liberal Theory (1990), and The Modern Liberal Theory of Man (1983).

Summing up his views on the modern state of ethical discussion in terms of present philosophy, Gaus remarked,

We live in an age of deep ideological and moral conflict, not only in politics but in social and political theory. Whatever might be one’s own convictions about the ultimate truth of the matter, it is not one on which all reasonable citizens will converge: as far as public moral reasoning goes, there are a number of reasonable ways of ordering social and political institutions. Each is convinced that his political views represent the truth, but to your neighbor they are errors. In the midst of this, mainstream political philosophy continues to spin out endless rationalizations of the theorist’s ideological convictions. What truly flummoxes contemporary political philosophy is how to seriously and productively theorize about a deeply morally diverse society. Given that this is [a] defining feature of our time, it is hard to overestimate how devastating a failure this is.

== The Tyranny of the Ideal ==
His 2016 book The Tyranny of the Ideal: Justice in a Diverse Society is a critical treatise about ethical idealism in the context of heterogeneous modern cultures. Gaus argues that an overriding emphasis on ideal social states causes individuals to wish for impossible political perfection and thus lose their sense of what constitutes practical policy advocacy as well as logical choices during elections. Gaus gives other warnings such as that people can lose their sense of how much has already been achieved and how well current situations have become in certain circumstances. In general, Gaus advocates for compromise and incremental socio-political reform.

Praise for the book appeared from scholarly publications such as Perspectives on Politics. Interest also appeared in the popular media, an example being the Vox.com news website.

== Publications ==
=== Books ===
- Benn, Stanley I.; Gaus, Gerald F., eds. (1983). Public and private in social life. London; New York: Croom Helm; St. Martin's Press. ISBN 0709906684. OCLC 9533001.
- Gaus, Gerald F. (1983). The modern liberal theory of man. London; New York: Croom Helm; St. Martin's Press. doi:10.4324/9780429278723. ISBN 0312540833. OCLC 9197467. S2CID 153671330.
- Gaus, Gerald F. (1990). Value and justification: the foundations of liberal theory. Cambridge, UK; New York: Cambridge University Press. doi:10.1017/CBO9780511625046. ISBN 0521375258. OCLC 20392630.
- Gaus, Gerald F. (1996). Justificatory liberalism: an essay on epistemology and political theory. New York: Oxford University Press. ISBN 0195094409. OCLC 31867389.
- D'Agostino, Fred; Gaus, Gerald F., eds. (1998). Public reason. The international research library of philosophy. Vol. 21. Aldershot, Hampshire, UK; Brookfield, VT: Ashgate Publishing. ISBN 1855219549. OCLC 37567285.
- Gaus, Gerald F. (1999). Social philosophy. Explorations in philosophy. Armonk, NY: M. E. Sharpe. doi:10.4324/9781315700717. ISBN 1563249480. OCLC 39013721.
- Gaus, Gerald F. (2000). Political concepts and political theories. Boulder, Colo.: Westview Press. ISBN 0813333318. OCLC 43607401.
- Bosanquet, Bernard (2001) [1923]. The philosophical theory of the state and related essays. Key texts. Edited by Gerald F. Gaus and William Sweet (4th ed.). South Bend, Ind.: St. Augustine's Press. ISBN 1890318655. OCLC 42391538.
- Gaus, Gerald F. (2003). Contemporary theories of liberalism: public reason as a post-Enlightenment project. London; Thousand Oaks, CA: Sage Publications. doi:10.4135/9781446218754. ISBN 0761961380. OCLC 50782568.
- Gaus, Gerald F.; Kukathas, Chandran, eds. (2004). Handbook of political theory. London; Thousand Oaks, CA: Sage Publications. doi:10.4135/9781848608139. ISBN 0761967877. OCLC 53192013.
- Gaus, Gerald F. (2008). On philosophy, politics, and economics. Wadsworth philosophical topics. Belmont, CA: Thomson Wadsworth. ISBN 9780495008989. OCLC 154753827.
- Favor, Christi; Gaus, Gerald F.; Lamont, Julian, eds. (2010). Essays on philosophy, politics & economics: integration & common research projects. Stanford, CA: Stanford Economics and Finance. ISBN 9780804762540. OCLC 438054922.
- Gaus, Gerald F. (2011). The order of public reason: a theory of freedom and morality in a diverse and bounded world. Cambridge, UK; New York: Cambridge University Press. doi:10.1017/CBO9780511780844. ISBN 9780521868563. OCLC 567165746.
- Gaus, Gerald F.; D'Agostino, Fred, eds. (2013). The Routledge Companion to Social and Political Philosophy. Routledge philosophy companions. New York: Routledge. doi:10.4324/9780203092231. ISBN 9780415874564. OCLC 707965867.
- Gaus, Gerald F. (2016). The tyranny of the ideal: justice in a diverse society. Princeton, NJ: Princeton University Press. doi:10.1515/9781400881048. ISBN 9780691158808. JSTOR j.ctt21c4v4g. OCLC 926820221.
- Turner, Piers Norris; Gaus, Gerald F., eds. (2018). Public reason in political philosophy: classic sources and contemporary commentaries. New York: Routledge. doi:10.4324/9781315110868. ISBN 9780415855594. OCLC 1000526922.
- Gaus, Gerald F. (2021). The open society and its complexities. Philosophy, politics, and economics. Oxford; New York: Oxford University Press. doi:10.1093/oso/9780190648978.001.0001. ISBN 9780190648978. OCLC 1235904621.
- Gaus, Gerald F.; Thrasher, John (2021). Philosophy, politics, and economics: an introduction (Updated and expanded ed.). Princeton, NJ: Princeton University Press. ISBN 9780691211251. OCLC 1276789270.
- Gaus, Gerald F. (2022). Vallier, Kevin (ed.). Public reason and diversity: reinterpretations of liberalism. Edited by Kevin Vallier. Cambridge, UK; New York: Cambridge University Press. doi:10.1017/9781009067867. ISBN 9781316512593. OCLC 1296529980. S2CID 253017238.

=== Book chapters ===
- Gaus, Gerald (2018). "Part I: Libertarianism and other Theories; Ch. 3: Hayekian 'Classical' Liberalism". In Brennan, Jason; van der Vossen, Bas; Schmidtz, David (eds.). The Routledge Handbook of Libertarianism. London and New York: Taylor & Francis Group. pp. 34–52. ISBN 9780367870591.

== See also ==
- American philosophy
- List of American philosophers
- List of University of Arizona people
