= R. Mark Isaac =

American economist

Robert Mark Isaac (born July 27, 1954) is an American academic who uses experimental economics to address basic microeconomic problems. His work has provided new empirical insights for many traditional economic problems, particularly cooperation and collective action problems.

== Biography ==
He was born in Oklahoma City. His publications include collaborations with Nobel Prize winner Vernon L. Smith addressing experimental conditions for trading, with Charles Plott addressing cooperation, pricing and trade, with Robert E. Forsythe addressing auctions, and with the philosopher David Schmidtz addressing public goods. He serves as John & Hallie Quinn Eminent Scholar in the Department of Economics at Florida State University, where he is a key faculty member affiliated with the Florida State University Experimental Social Science Lab and is also a Courtesy Professor of Law. He is the editor of the Research in Experimental Economics book series, on the board of editors of the journal Experimental Economics, treasurer of the Economic Science Association, and holds the title of El Jefe of the Christian Men's Nicotine Research Collective. Previously, he served as Chair of the Economics Department at the University of Arizona.

== Publications ==
Books

- R. Mark Isaac; Daniel Friedman; Duncan James; Shyam Sunder (2014). Risky Curves: On the Empirical Failure of Expected Utility. Taylor & Francis. ISBN 978-1-317-82123-6.ISBN 9780415636100
- The Allocation of Scarce Resources: Experimental Economics and the Problem of Allocating Airport Slots, co-authored with David Grether and Charles Plott. (Boulder, Co.: Westview Press, 1989).
- Current editor of Research in Experimental Economics for JAI Press, Inc.: Volume 4 (1991), Volume 5 (1993), Volume 6 (1996), Volumes 7 (1999), Volume 8 (2001), and Volume 9 (2002).
