= Gary Varner =

American philosopher (1957–2023)

- Born: March 10, 1957
- Died: June 28, 2023 (aged 66)

Education
- Education: Arizona State University; University of Georgia; University of Wisconsin–Madison

Philosophical work
- Institutions: University of Wisconsin–Stevens Point; Washington University in St. Louis; Texas A&M University
- Main interests: Environmental ethics, animal ethics, utilitarianism, R. M. Hare
- Notable works: In Nature's Interests? (1998); Personhood, Ethics, and Animal Cognition (2012)
- Notable ideas: Biocentric individualism, Harean approaches to animal ethics

Gary Edward Varner (March 10, 1957 – June 28, 2023) was an American philosopher specializing in environmental ethics, philosophical questions related to animal rights and animal welfare, and R. M. Hare's two-level utilitarianism. At the time of his death, he was an emeritus professor in the department of philosophy at Texas A&M University; he had been based at the university since 1990. He was educated at Arizona State University, the University of Georgia, and the University of Wisconsin–Madison; at Madison, where he was supervised by Jon Morline, he wrote one of the first doctoral theses on environmental ethics. Varner's first monograph was In Nature's Interests?, which was published by Oxford University Press in 1998. In the book, Varner defended a form of biocentric individualism, according to which all living entities have morally considerable interests.

Varner started a research project in 2001 that looked at animals in Hare's two-level utilitarianism. The project's initial monograph, Personhood, Ethics, and Animal Cognition, was released by Oxford in 2012. In the book, Varner moved away from his biocentrism, instead endorsing a developed version of Hare's ethics. Varner draws a distinction between persons, near-persons and merely sentient beings; although all are morally considerable, the lives of persons are of the most significance, and the lives of merely sentient beings are of the least. The practical consequences of this view, though initial comments were offered in Personhood, Ethics, and Animal Cognition, was to be explored in Sustaining Animals, with which Varner at one time had a contract with Oxford. His third book was Defending Biodiversity: Environmental Science and Ethics, co-authored with Jonathan Newman and Stefan Linquist, and published with Cambridge University Press. It was published in 2017.

== Life and career ==
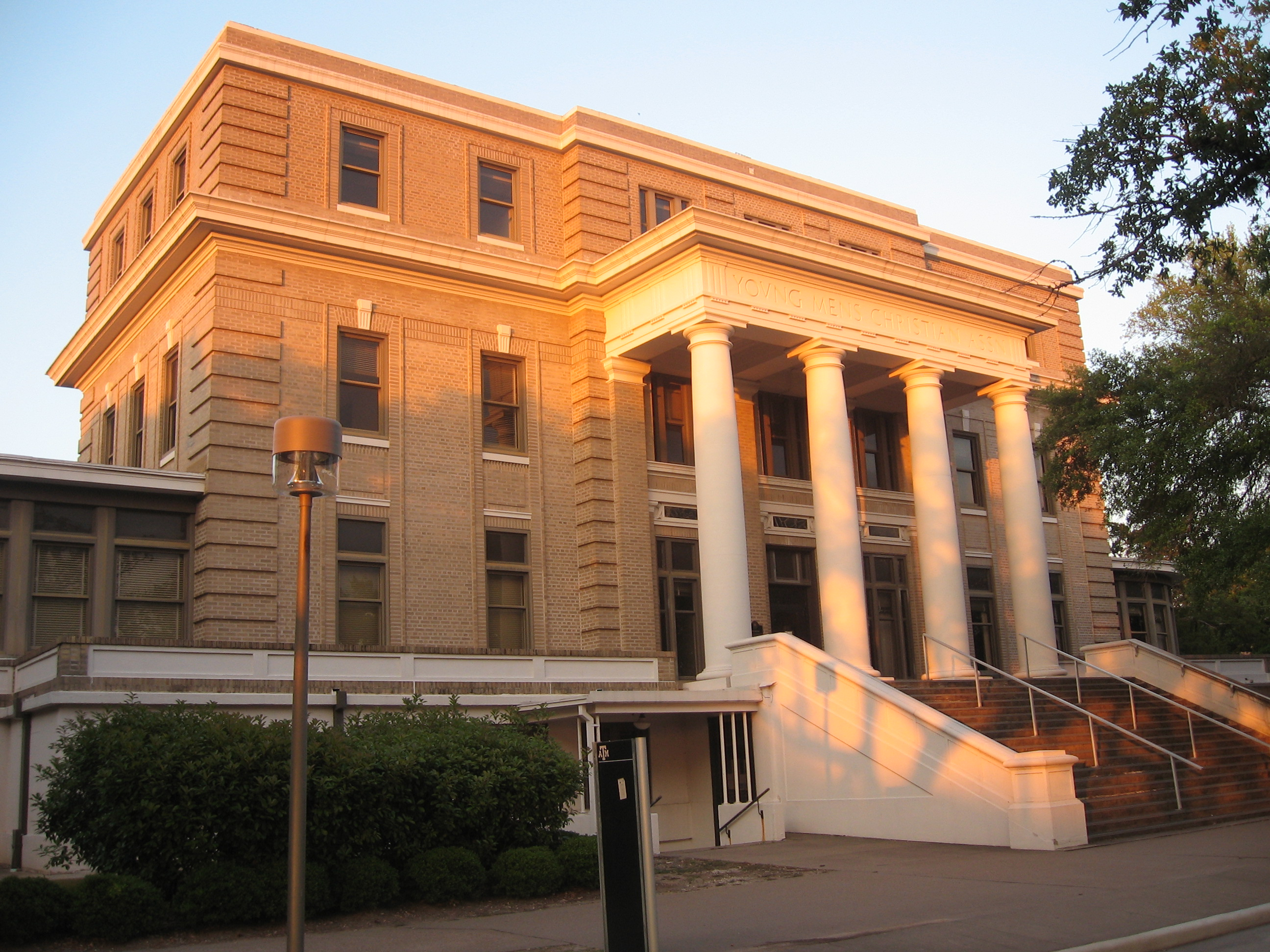
The YMCA Building, Texas A&M University, houses the university's department of philosophy, where Varner was based from 1990 until his death.

Varner completed a Bachelor of Arts in philosophy at Arizona State University in 1980, before studying for a Master of Arts in philosophy at the University of Georgia, which he completed in 1983. He read for a PhD at University of Wisconsin–Madison, writing a thesis on environmental ethics; this was one of the first on the topic. Developed versions of some of the thesis's chapters were later published as chapters 2, 3, and 4 Varner's first book, In Nature's Interests?. His doctoral research was supervised by Jon Morline, who continued as a supervisor even after leaving Wisconsin. Graduating from Madison in 1988, Varner had a number of short-term jobs in the late 1980s; he lectured in philosophy at the University of Wisconsin–Stevens Point from 1987 to 1988, acted as a visiting assistant professor at Madison's Institute of Environmental Studies in the Summer of 1988, and took up the same role, in philosophy, in Arts and Sciences at Washington University in St. Louis from 1988 to 1990.

Varner joined Texas A&M University in 1990, becoming an assistant professor in 1991. He became director of graduate studies in 1994, a post he kept until 2010. Varner was promoted to associate professor in 1996, and, in 1998, published his first book: In Nature's Interests? Interests, Animal Rights, and Environmental Ethics, which was a part of Oxford University Press's Environmental Ethics and Science Policy Series, edited by Kristin Schrader-Frechette. Varner was promoted to full professor in 2010, and acted as department head from 2011 to 2014.

Varner's second monograph, Personhood, Ethics, and Animal Cognition: Situating Animals in the Two-Level Utilitarianism of R. M. Hare, was published in 2012 by Oxford University Press. Varner had been working on questions about R. M. Hare and animals since 2001, when he taught a graduate class exploring the subject; given that Peter Singer was a student of Hare, Varner was interested in exploring whether Hare's philosophy endorsed Singer's conclusions about animal liberation. A project entitled Harey Animals: Situating Animals in the Two-Level Utilitarianism of R. M. Hare was submitted to Oxford University Press, but this was subsequently split into two books; Personhood, Ethics, and Animal Cognition was the first, while the second, Sustaining Animals: Envisioning Humane, Sustainable Communities, was under contract with the publisher. While Personhood, Ethics, and Animal Cognition addresses theoretical issues in Hare's philosophy, Sustaining Animals was to be more practically focussed, exploring the applicability of the Harean philosophy developed in Personhood, Ethics, and Animal Cognition to real-world issues concerning human-animal relationships.

In 2017, Varner's Defending Biodiversity: Environmental Science and Ethics, co-authored with the University of Guelph ecologist Jonathan Newman and the Guelph philosopher Stefan Linquist, was published by Cambridge University Press. It was the subject of a topical collection of articles in volume 35, issue 1 of Biology & Philosophy, published in 2020. Varner died on June 28, 2023, after a period with cancer. He was 66. At the time of his death, he was a Professor Emeritus of Philosophy at Texas A&M.

== Thought ==
=== Biocentric individualism ===
Varner's In Nature's Interests? offers a resolution of the debate between individualistic approaches to animal rights and holistic accounts of environmental ethics. Varner defends an interest-based biocentric individualism according to which all living beings—including plants—have morally significant interests that ground prima facie (though overridable) duties. The approach follows in the tradition of the work of Kenneth Goodpaster and Paul W. Taylor, though Varner's approach differs from Taylor's in its focus on interests rather than duties, with Varner showing clear utilitarian commitments.

Varner begins by critiquing holistic approaches to environmental ethics, using J. Baird Callicott's as his example. He argues that the burden of proof is with holists to defend the claim that ecosystems have interests or have value for some other reason. He next considers desires as the paradigmatic basis of interests, exploring which beings have desires. Nonetheless, he argues that desires cannot be the sole basis of interests; 19th-century mariners, for instance, had an interest in using ascorbic acid to avoid scurvy, though they could not have desired the acid, as they did not know about it. Instead, such people had a "biological" interest in the acid. It is, Varner argues, the presence of biological interests that separates living beings from artifacts. This grounds Varner's argument for biocentrism, which Mark Rowlands summarises as follows:

1. Nothing at or below the level of a fish possesses desires.
2. Nevertheless, all living things possess biological needs, and these needs are plausibly construed as interests.
3. The welfare of an organism O is, at least in part, to be understood in terms of the interests, rather than the desires, of O.
4. Therefore, all living things have a welfare.
5. Therefore, all living things are morally considerable.

Rowlands argues that the problem with the book's central approach is that it assumes that all interests have a clear relation to welfare and thus moral considerability; an assumption which, he argues, is partially undermined by the introduction of biological interests. Jon Jensen, who reviewed the book for Ethics and the Environment, raised a similar worry, arguing that Varner did not sufficiently justify his claim that biological interests are inherently morally significant.

A distinctive aspect of Varner's theory as presented in In Nature's Interests? is the hierarchy of interests that he proposes; biological interests are the least important, with desire-based interests of greater significance and "ground projects"—possessed only by humans, these are "a nexus of [an individual's] most important desires"—of the most weight. Thus, Varner defends a kind of "axiological anthropocentrism"; this can be distinguished from "valuational anthropocentrism", according to which only humans have inherent value.

The book also has a practical dimension, presenting debates between anthropocentric and non-anthropocentric approaches to environmental ethics as of little practical consequence, and suggesting that animal rights goals can be consistent with holistic environmentalist goals. Jensen argues that Varner's own discussion of the reconciliation of environmentalism and animal advocacy is too narrow, but that, nonetheless, Varner's own biocentric individualism offers potential in this area, even despite the limited engagement in the book with practical animal-related issues.

=== Two-level utilitarianism ===
Hare's philosophy of two-level utilitarianism has been a focus of Varner's since the early 2000s, and was the subject of his Personhood, Ethics, and Animal Cognition. In the book, Varner breaks with his previous biocentrism, instead endorsing sentientism (the idea that sentience is necessary and sufficient for moral considerability), prescriptivism, and two-level utilitarianism. The book is split into three parts: "Hare's Two-Level Utilitarianism", "Persons, Near-Persons, and the Merely Sentient", and "Formulating ILS [Intuitive-Level System] Rules for Persons, Near-Persons, and the Merely Sentient". The first part offers a reconstruction and analysis of Hare's philosophy, while the latter two offer an original position on animal ethics and personhood.

In Part I, Varner offers considerable endorsement of Harean philosophy. Varner interprets Hare as understanding that utilitarianism derives from prescriptivism, and affirms Hare's argument on this point. He goes on to discuss the utility of Intuitive-Level System (ILS) rules; these are the rules that one lives by in day-to-day life, which, though ultimately justified by it, do not derive their content from utilitarian calculation. There are, for Varner, four key kinds of ILSs: "common morality, personal morality, professional ethics, and laws". Though these are deontological in "flavor", following the precepts of these ILSs is generally justified under two-level utilitarianism. Further arguments—these are original, rather than being derived from Hare's own—are then offered for Hare's prescriptivism.

In Part II, Varner adopts a higher-order thought theory of consciousness and reviews evidence for animal consciousness. He argues that, according to contemporary science, vertebrates are conscious (i.e., sentient, able to feel pain), but few invertebrates are; cephalopods are an exception. He goes on to argue that most animals lack a biographical sense of self, something possessed by paradigmatic humans. A good life for human persons, consequently, "consists in living a good story", meaning that persons can be harmed in ways that non-persons cannot. Varner denies that nonhuman animals lack the psychological sophistication necessary for personhood, but argues that some, nonetheless, may be "near-persons"; this means that they lack a biographical sense of self, but possess autonoetic consciousness. Possible candidates include nonhuman primates, as well as Corvidae, Cetacea and Elephantidae, and rats and parrots. Varner frames the lives of near-persons as of less significance than the lives of persons, but of greater significance than the lives of other animals who are nonetheless sentient. The distinctions drawn in Part II are logically independent of any commitment to utilitarianism, Harean or otherwise.

In Part III, Varner explores the replaceability argument (the idea that it would be ethically acceptable to painlessly kill beings if it was immediately replaced with a new equally happy being) in the context of two-level utilitarianism. At the critical level, he argues that both humans and animals are replaceable. However, he argues that the intuitive-level idea that humans are not replaceable should be respected. Animals typically kept on farms are, for Varner, replaceable, meaning that certain forms of animal agriculture are permissible. Varner's also claims that there is a prima facie good in creating more happy animals and more happy humans, the latter meaning that there is a prima facie good in human procreation, and a prima facie wrong in abortion. This, however, applies only to critical-level thinking, and good intuitive-level theorising, he argues, would typically leave these decisions up to individuals. Varner also explores the issue of "marginal" cases. Given that he holds that the lives of nonhuman non-persons and nonhuman near-persons are of lesser value than those of human persons, it may seem that Varner has to accept that the lives of human non-persons and human near-persons are of less value than the lives of human persons or else face the charge of speciesism or inconsistency. However, Varner argues that human non- and near-persons should be given equal rights to life as human persons on the basis that, first, human persons have strong relationships with human non-persons, and, second, human persons may fear becoming human non-persons.

Varner then considers a range of proposals for sustainable, humane agriculture, including replacing cattle with buffalo and engineering blind chickens. Varner defends demi-vegetarianism, holding that humans should eat less meat and be more selective about where their meat comes from; factory farming, for example, is likely unacceptable. The book closes with a consideration of the relationship between a Harean approach to animal ethics and Singer's approach; Varner argues that Singer has employed two-level utilitarianism, and implicitly supports the idea of near-persons. Varner also argues that Singer, despite the latter's advocacy for vegetarianism, presents a theory that supports certain forms of humane agriculture.

== Selected bibliography ==
- Varner, Gary (1990). "Biological functions and biological interests". Southern Journal of Philosophy. 28 (2): 251–70. doi:10.1111/j.2041-6962.1990.tb00545.x.
- Varner, Gary (1991). "No holism without pluralism". Environmental Ethics. 13 (2): 175–9. doi:10.5840/enviroethics199113228.
- Varner, Gary (1994). "The prospects for consensus and convergence in the animal rights debate". Hastings Center Report. 24 (1): 24–8. doi:10.2307/3562383.
- Varner, Gary (1994). "In defense of the vegan ideal: Rhetoric and bias in the nutrition literature". Journal of Agricultural and Environmental Ethics. 7 (1): 29–40. doi:10.1007/BF01997222.
- Varner, Gary (1995). "Can animal rights activists be environmentalists?" In: Environmental Philosophy and Environmental Activism, edited by Donald Marietta and Lester Embree, 169–201. Lanham, Maryland: Rowman & Littlefield. ISBN 9780847680559.
- Varner, Gary (1998). In Nature's Interests? Interests, Animal Rights, and Environmental Ethics. Oxford: Oxford University Press. ISBN 9780195108651.
- Varner, Gary (1999). "How facts matter: On the language condition and the scope of pain in the animal kingdom". Pain Forum. 8: 84–6. doi:10.1016/S1082-3174(99)70031-0.
- Allen, Colin, Gary Varner, and Jason Zinser (2000). "Prolegomena to any future artificial moral agent". Journal of Experimental & Theoretical Artificial Intelligence. 12 (3): 251–61. doi:10.1080/09528130050111428.
- Varner, Gary (2002). "Biocentric individualism". In: Environmental Ethics: What Really Matters, what Really Works, edited by David Schmidtz and Elizabeth Willott, 108–20. Oxford: Oxford University Press. ISBN 9780195139099.
- Varner, Gary (2012). Personhood, Ethics, and Animal Cognition: Situating Animals in the Two-Level Utilitarianism of R. M. Hare. Oxford: Oxford University Press. ISBN 9780199758784.
- Newman, Jonathan, Gary Varner, and Stefan Linquist (2017). Defending Biodiversity: Environmental Science and Ethics. Cambridge: Cambridge University Press.
