= Victoria Braithwaite =

British scientist (1967–2019)

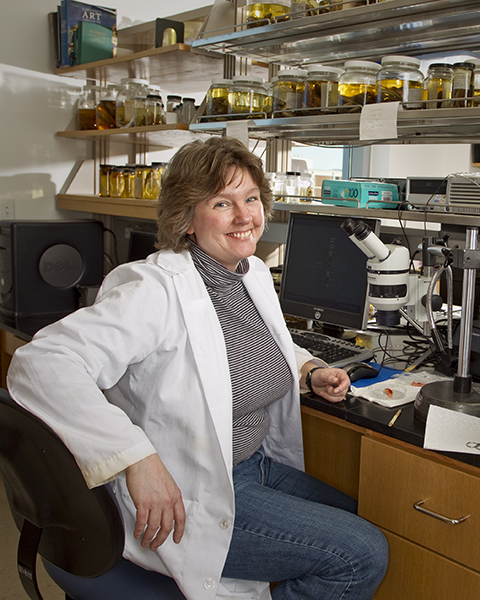
- Victoria Braithewaite in 2011
- Born: 19 July 1967; Bradford, England
- Died: 30 September 2019 (aged 52)
- Education: Somerville College, Oxford
- Scientific career
- Workplaces: Pennsylvania State University; University of Glasgow; University of Edinburgh

Victoria A. Braithwaite (19 July 1967 – 30 September 2019) was an English scientist who was a Professor of Animal Behaviour and Cognition at Pennsylvania State University. She was the first person to demonstrate that fish feel pain, which impacted animal welfare research and changed guidelines for the treatment of fish in laboratories and fisheries in the UK, Europe, and Canada.

== Early life and education ==
Braithwaite was born in Bradford. She was one of seven children. Her mother, June Pickles, was chair of the Halifax magistrates' bench, and her father, Alan Braithwaite, was a company director. She attended Bradford Grammar School, where she was not encouraged to apply to the University of Oxford. She did not take this advice, and eventually completed her undergraduate degree in zoology and doctoral degree, supported by a Christopher Welch scholarship, at the Somerville College, Oxford. Her thesis considered the visual information used by homing pigeons to return to their nests. She demonstrated that birds fly home faster when they see their surroundings before being released. She joined the University of Glasgow where she studied the cognitive abilities of salmon. It was during this project that she became interested in animal behaviour.

== Research and career ==
Braithwaite spent her career investigating the cognitive abilities of fish and other animals. She showed that fish which live in stable environments (like ponds) use visual markers for guides, whereas fish that live in rivers learn directions using sequences (like left, right, left, right). Her research was the first to show that an animal's cognition is shaped by the worlds in which they live. To recognise her contributions to our understanding of animal navigation, Braithwaite was elected to the Royal Institute of Navigation in 2005.

She moved to the University of Edinburgh in 1995 where she began to investigate whether or not fish felt pain – so-called nociception. Whilst it was well understood that chickens and sheep experienced pain, before Braithwaite it was not known whether or not fish did too. She demonstrated fish felt pain using a series of experiments, the first of which included showing that fish contained the correct anatomy to detect pain (nociceptors). She showed that fish produce pain-killing opioids in the same way that mammals do. She then investigated whether or not they responded to stimuli, and demonstrated that these receptors feel bodily damage and that fish behaviour is different when they are exposed to an unpleasant stimulus. She then demonstrated that fish that had been exposed to an unpleasant stimulus, for example, vinegar, behaved differently when made to perform tasks after they had taken human painkillers. Her work changed protocols regulating the ways fish are treated in laboratories and fisheries in the UK, Europe, and Canada. As of 2019 other countries were also considering making such changes.

Braithwaite joined Pennsylvania State University in 2007, where she was appointed Professor of Fisheries and Biology. Here she demonstrated that providing a more natural environment for fish impacted their cognitive abilities and likelihood to survive in the world. Before Braithwaite's work, fish that had been reared in tanks did not survive when they were released into the world. Whilst a visiting fellow at the Berlin Institute for Advanced Study in 2015, Braithwaite analysed the inferences that could be made about animal pain and other emotional states. She was offered the directorship of the IGB Leibniz-Institute of Freshwater Ecology and Inland Fisheries in 2018, but was unable to assume the position.

=== Selected publications ===
Her publications include:

- Braithwaite, Victoria (2003). "Do fishes have nociceptors? Evidence for the evolution of a vertebrate sensory system". Proc. R. Soc. Lond. 270 (1520): 1115–1121. doi:10.1098/rspb.2003.2349. PMC 1691351. PMID 12816648.
- — (2003). "The evolution of sex differences in spatial ability". Behav. Neurosci. 117 (3): 403–411. doi:10.1037/0735-7044.117.3.403. PMID 12802870.
- — (2005). "In situ examination of boldness–shyness traits in the tropical poeciliid, Brachyraphis episcopi". Anim. Behav. 70 (5): 1003–1009. doi:10.1016/j.anbehav.2004.12.022. S2CID 54423383.
- — (2010). Do Fish Feel Pain?. Oxford University Press. ISBN 9780191613968.

== Awards and honours ==
- 2005 Fellow of the Royal Institute of Navigation
- 2006 Fisheries Society of the British Isles Medal
- 2016 Fellow of the Linnean Society of London

== Personal life ==
Braithwaite in 1992 married the evolutionary biologist Andrew Read; they eventually divorced. Together they had two sons. In 2018 she was diagnosed with pancreatic cancer. She died on 30 September 2019.
