= Avoidance learning =

Type of operant conditioning

An avoidance response is a natural adaptive behavior performed in response to danger. Excessive avoidance has been suggested to contribute to anxiety disorders, leading psychologists and neuroscientists to study how avoidance behaviors are learned using rat or mouse models. Avoidance learning is a type of operant conditioning (also known as instrumental conditioning).

== Active avoidance, passive avoidance, and escape responses ==
An escape response occurs when an aversive stimulus is presented and the subject makes a response to remove or escape the stimulus. In the laboratory, this is usually represented by a rat given a small shock to its feet through a grid floor and shuttling through a small opening in its chamber which stops the shock. Such a response is considered active avoidance when it occurs prior to the stimulus presentation and prevents the stimulus from occurring. In contrast, passive avoidance is the prevention of an aversive stimulus by withholding a behavior, which is usually demonstrated by placing a rat in a chamber with a raised platform in which refraining from stepping off the platform prevents a foot shock. To demonstrate an avoidance response requires repeated reinforcement through instrumental conditioning.

== Avoidance learning in the laboratory ==
=== Signaled active avoidance ===
Signaled avoidance involves classical conditioning such that the aversive stimulus becomes an unconditioned stimulus (US) paired with a conditioned stimulus (CS), usually a tone or flash of light. First rats are conditioned to associate the CS with an inescapable US until presentation of the CS elicits a fear response. After that, rats are placed into avoidance chambers and presented with the CS for a short amount of time, during which they may shuttle through the opening, preventing the US from occurring, therefore presenting an avoidance response.

=== Unsignaled avoidance ===
This format does not use Pavlovian learning to condition avoidance responses. In the same shuttle chamber, aversive stimuli are presented in regular time intervals (usually 5 seconds) without any neutral stimuli preceding them. These intervals are called shock-shock (S-S) intervals, but when an avoidance response is made by the rat, the next shock is delayed by a 30-second response-shock (R-S) interval.

=== Pavlovian instrumental transfer ===
This form of conditioning combines Pavlovian learning with unsignaled avoidance conditioning in order to test whether rats are able to transfer their learned behavioral response to a previously inescapable conditioned stimulus. First rats undergo traditional Pavlovain fear learning in which they are not able to escape or avoid the US shock following the CS tone. After the training session the rats complete unsignaled avoidance learning (see above) for multiple days. As a test of Pavlovian instrumental transfer, rats are placed into the same shuttle chambers as for unsignaled avoidance training and presented with the tone CS they received during the Pavlovian conditioning. In this case they have the opportunity to avoid the incoming shock as long as they are able to connect that the CS precedes a shock in different contexts.

== Neural circuits ==
The neural circuit responsible for expressing signaled avoidance behavior is the same that controls extinction of fear responses. The presentation of the aversive stimulus activates neurons in the central amygdala which project to the periaqueductal gray region to elicit a fear-motivated motor response. Cells in the infralimbic (IL) region of the medial prefrontal cortex (mPFC) send inhibitory signals to the central amygdala to prevent the motor response. In rats, the fear-motivated response is to freeze, so in both fear extinction and avoidance conditioning inhibition of the amygdala via the mPFC leads to more movement (shuttling) and less freezing. The basolateral region of the amygdala is implicated in extinction of fear behaviors and expression of avoidance behaviors; however, the central amygdala is necessary for Pavlovian instrumental transfer.

== See also ==
- Conditioned avoidance response test
