= Jacques Bouveresse =

French philosopher (1940–2021)

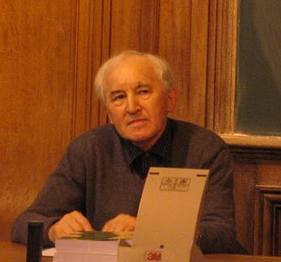
- Born: 20 August 1940; Épenoy, Doubs
- Died: 9 May 2021 (aged 80); Paris, France

Education
- Education: École Normale Supérieure
- Doctoral advisor: Yvon Belaval
- Other advisor: Jules Vuillemin

Philosophical work
- Era: Contemporary philosophy
- Region: Western philosophy
- School: Analytic philosophy
- Institutions: Collège de France
- Doctoral students: Pascal Engel; Claudine Tiercelin; Sandra Laugier
- Main interests: Philosophy of science, epistemology, philosophy of mathematics
- Notable ideas: Criticism of structuralism

Jacques Bouveresse (French: [ʒak buvʁɛs]; 20 August 1940 – 9 May 2021) was a French philosopher who wrote on subjects including Ludwig Wittgenstein, Robert Musil, Karl Kraus, philosophy of science, epistemology, philosophy of mathematics and analytical philosophy. Bouveresse was called "an avis rara among the better known French philosophers in his championing of critical standards of thought."

He was Professor Emeritus at the Collège de France where until 2010 he held the chair of philosophy of language and epistemology. His disciple Claudine Tiercelin was appointed to a chair of metaphysics and philosophy of knowledge upon his retirement.

== Education and career ==
Born on 20 August 1940 in Épenoy in the Doubs département of France into a farming family, Jacques Bouveresse completed his secondary education at the seminary of Besançon. He spent two years of preparation for the baccalauréat in philosophy and scholastic theology at Faverney in Haute-Saône. He followed his preparatory literary classes at the Lycée Lakanal in Sceaux, and in 1961 entered the École Normale Supérieure in Paris.

He presented his doctoral thesis in philosophy on Wittgenstein, entitled "Le mythe de l'intériorité. Expérience, signification et langage privé chez Wittgenstein".

Beginning with his earliest works, he consistently constructed his own philosophical and intellectual path, without following the normal routes and modes of academia. In 1976, Wittgenstein was practically unknown in France, as were Musil and the logic and analytical philosophy which Bouveresse had begun to study in the 1960s. These two last domains notably propelled him towards the lectures of Jules Vuillemin and Gilles Gaston Granger, who at the time were practically alone in occupying themselves with these problems, and with whom he maintained a lasting friendship.

Academic career:

- 1966–1969: Assistant to the Section de Philosophie of the University of Paris (teaching logic)
- 1969–1971: Maître-Assistant to the UER de Philosophie of the Université Paris I
- 1971–1975: Attached to the CNRS
- 1975–1979: Maître de Conférences at the Université Paris I
- 1979–1983: Professor at the University of Geneva
- 1983–1995: Professor at the University of Paris
- From 1995: Professor at the Collège de France in the chair of philosophie du langage et de la connaissance.

== Works ==
Bouveresse's philosophy is a continuation of the intellectual and philosophical tradition of central Europe (Brentano, Boltzmann, Helmholtz, Frege, the Vienna Circle, Kurt Gödel). His philosophical programme is in nearly all respects similar to the one conducted by many present day Analytic philosophers.

=== The thought of Robert Musil ===
Jacques Bouveresse is interested in the thought of the early 20th-century Austrian novelist Robert Musil (who wrote a thesis on philosophy), famous for his novel The Man Without Qualities, as well as the aversion/fascination with which Paul Valéry regarded philosophy.

=== Incompleteness and philosophy ===
Apart from his work on Ludwig Wittgenstein, Jacques Bouveresse is interested in the incompleteness theorems of Kurt Gödel and their philosophical consequences. It is on this account that he has attacked, in a popular work Prodiges et vertiges de l'analogie, the use made of these theorems by Régis Debray. Bouveresse denounces the literary distortion of a scientific concept for the purpose of a thesis. This distortion, according to him, has no other purpose than to overwhelm a readership which lacks the training necessary to comprehend such complex theorems. Bouveresse's reproach to Debray is not that he uses a scientific concept for the purpose of an analogy, but that he uses such a difficult to understand theorem in the attempt to provide an absolute justification in the form of the classic sophism of the argument from authority.

According to Bouveresse, the incompleteness of a formal system which applies to certain mathematical systems in no way implies the incompleteness of sociology, which is not a formal system.

== Bibliography (in French) ==
Unless stated otherwise, published by Éditions de Minuit. Most books published by the Collège de France editions are freely accessible on the Collège's website.

- 1969: La philosophie des sciences, du positivisme logique in Histoire de la philosophie, vol. 4. Ed. François Châtelet
- 1971: La parole malheureuse. De l'Alchimie linguistique à la grammaire philosophique
- 1973: Wittgenstein : la rime et la raison, science, éthique et esthétique
- 1976: Le mythe de l'intériorité. Expérience, signification et langage privé chez Wittgenstein
- 1984: Le philosophe chez les autophages
- 1984: Rationalité et cynisme
- 1987: La force de la règle, Wittgenstein et l'invention de la nécessité
- 1988: Le pays des possibles, Wittgenstein, les mathématiques et le monde réel
- 1991: Philosophie, mythologie et pseudo-science, Wittgenstein lecteur de Freud, Éditions de l'éclat
- 1991: Herméneutique et linguistique, suivi de Wittgenstein et la philosophie du langage, Éditions de l'éclat
- 1993: L'homme probable, Robert Musil, le hasard, la moyenne et l'escargot de l'Histoire, Éditions de l'éclat
- 1994: 'Wittgenstein', in Michel Meyer, La philosophie anglo-saxonne, PUF
- 1995: Langage, perception et réalité, vol.1, la perception et le jugement, Éditions Jacqueline Chambon
- 1996: La demande philosophique. Que veut la philosophie et que peut-on vouloir d'elle ?, Éditions de l'Eclat
- 1997: Dire et ne rien dire, l'illogisme, l'impossibilité et le non-sens, Éditions Jacqueline Chambon
- 1998: Le Philosophe et le réel. Entretiens avec Jean-Jacques Rosat, Hachette
- 1999: Prodiges et vertiges de l'analogie. De l'abus des belles-lettres dans la pensée, Éditions Liber-Raisons d'agir
- 2000: Essais I - Wittgenstein, la modernité, le progrès et le déclin , Agone
- 2001: Essais II - L'Epoque, la mode, la morale, la satire, Agone
- 2001: Schmock ou le triomphe du journalisme, La grande bataille de Karl Kraus, Seuil
- 2003: Essais III : Wittgenstein ou les sortilèges du langage, Agone
- 2001: La voix de l'âme et les chemins de l'esprit , Seuil, coll. Liber
- 2004: Bourdieu savant & politique, Agone
- 2004: Langage, perception et réalité, tome 2, Physique, phénoménologie et grammaire, Ed. Jacqueline Chambon
- 2004: Essais IV - Pourquoi pas des philosophes, Agone
- 2005: Robert Musil. L'homme probable, le hasard, la moyenne et l'escargot de l'histoire, (new edition of 1993 above), Éditions de l'éclat
- 2006: Essais V - Descartes, Leibniz, Kant, Agone
- Peut-on ne pas croire ? Sur la vérité, la croyance et la foi, Agone, 2007
- Satire & prophétie : les voix de Karl Kraus, Agone, 2007
- La Connaissance de l'écrivain : sur la littérature, la vérité et la vie, Agone, 2008
- Que peut-on faire de la religion ?, Agone, 2011
- Essais VI. Les Lumières des positivistes, Agone, 2011 ISBN 978-2-7489-0066-8
- Dans le labyrinthe : nécessité, contingence et liberté chez Leibniz. Cours 2009 & 2010, Publications du Collège de France, 2013
- Qu’est-ce qu’un système philosophique ? Cours 2007 & 2008, Publications du Collège de France, 2013
- Études de philosophie du langage, Publications du Collège de France, 2013
- À temps et à contretemps. Conférences publiques, La philosophie de la connaissance au Collège de France, 2013
- Why I am so very unFrench, and other essays, Publications du Collège de France, 2013
- Le danseur et sa corde, Agone, 2014
- De la philosophie considérée comme un sport, Agone, 2015
- Le Troisième monde. Signification, vérité et connaissance chez Frege, Publications du Collège de France, 2015
- L’Éthique de la croyance et la question du ‘poids de l’autorité’, Publications du Collège de France, 2015
- Une épistémologie réaliste est-elle possible ? Réflexions sur le réalisme structurel de Poincaré, Publications du Collège de France, 2015.
- Ernest Renan, la science, la métaphysique, la religion et la question de leur avenir, Publications du Collège de France, 2015
- Nietzsche contre Foucault : Sur la vérité, la connaissance et le pouvoir, Agone, 2016
- Percevoir la musique. Helmholtz et la théorie physiologique de la musique, Éditions L'improviste, Collection « Les Aéronautes de l'esprit », 2016
- Le Mythe moderne du progrès, Agone, 2017
- Le Parler de la musique, I. La musique, le langage, la culture et l’Histoire, L’Improviste, 2017
- L’Histoire de la philosophie, l’histoire des sciences, et la philosophie de l’histoire de la philosophie, Publications du Collège de France, 2017
- Les Premiers jours de l’inhumanité. Karl Kraus et la guerre, Hors d’atteinte, 2019
- Le Parler de la musique, II. La Musique chez les Wittgenstein, L’Improviste, 2019
- Le Parler de la musique, III. Entre Brahms et Wagner : Nietzsche, Wittgenstein, la philosophie et la musique, L’Improviste, 2020
- Les foudres de Nietzsche: Et l'aveuglement des disciples, Hors-d'atteinte, 212 p., 2021
- Les vagues du langage : le « paradoxe de Wittgenstein » ou comment peut-on suivre une règle ?, Seuil, 2022

== Co-edited books ==
- (with Herman Parret) Meaning and Understanding, De Gruyter, 1981.
- (with Sandra Laugier and Jean-Jacques Rosat) Wittgenstein, dernières pensées, Agone, 2002.
- (with Jean-Jacques Rosat) Philosophies de la perception. Phénoménologie, grammaire et sciences cognitives, Odile Jacob, 2003.
- (with Delphine Chapuis-Schmitz and Jean-Jacques Rosat) L’Empirisme logique à la limite. Schlick, le langage et l’expérience, CNRS-éditions, 2006.
- (with Pierre Wagner) Mathématiques et expérience : 1919-1938. L'application et l'interprétation des mathématiques dans la philosophie de l'empirisme logique de l'entre-deux guerres, Odile Jacob, 2008.
