= Claudine Tiercelin =

French philosopher (born 1952)

- Born: June 2, 1952 (age 74); Brest, France

Education
- Education: Paris-Sorbonne University; University of California, Berkeley; University of Paris 1 Panthéon-Sorbonne
- Doctoral advisor: Jacques Bouveresse
- Other advisor: Pierre Bourdieu

Philosophical work
- Era: 21st-century philosophy
- Region: Western philosophy
- School: Analytic philosophy, pragmatism
- Institutions: Collège de France; University of Paris XII; University of Tours; University of Paris I Panthéon-Sorbonne; University of Rouen Normandy
- Main interests: Metaphysics, philosophy of science, pragmatics

Claudine Tiercelin (French: [klodin tjɛʁsəlɛ̃]) is a French philosopher, working on metaphysics and philosophy of science. She is professor of philosophy at the Collège de France, after having been professor at the Paris XII.

== Biography ==
Claudine Tiercelin was born in Brest, France 1952. When she was 9, her father, a soldier, died in the First Indochina War. As a result, she was eligible for a scholarship which allowed her to study at the Lycée Français Charles de Gaulle in London. In 1972 she joined the École normale supérieure de jeunes filles. In 1976 she received her Agrégation in philosophy. During this time she attended first the courses of Althusser and Derrida at the École Normale Supérieure, before developing a passion for those of Jules Vuillemin and Jacques Bouveresse, who would become her thesis advisor. She received a master's degree in sociology under the direction of Pierre Bourdieu on the subject « Les Usages sociaux des sciences sociales dans l'entreprise » (The social functions of the social sciences in business). In 1982 she defended her third cycle doctorate on Charles Sanders Peirce's philosophy of knowledge and language, followed by a state doctorate on Peirce's treatment of the problem of universals.

From 2000 to 2003, she was the first female president of the jury des agrégations de philosophie. She is a researcher at the Institut Jean Nicod, and has been a senior member of the Institut universitaire de France. She has taught medieval and contemporary philosophy at several universities in France (Rouen, Paris 1, Tours, Paris 12) and overseas, notably at Fordham University in New York where she was the C. S. Peirce Professor of Philosophy. She is currently vice-president of the Charles S. Peirce Society. In December 2010, she took up the Chair of Metaphysics and Philosophy of Knowledge, marking the first chair of metaphysics in the history of the Collège de France. In 2011, she was asked to carry out an investigation into academic ethics.

On 4 December 2017, she was elected member of the Académie des sciences morales et politiques (Institut de France), to the position previously occupied by Jean Mesnard.

== Bibliography ==
=== Books ===
- 1993: La Pensée-signe, Éd. Jacqueline Chambon.
- 1993: Peirce et le pragmatisme, PUF.
- 2002: Hilary Putnam, l'héritage pragmatiste, PUF.
- 2005: Le doute en question : Parades pragmatistes au défi sceptique, Éditions de l'Éclat.
- 2011: Le Ciment des choses, Les Éditions d'Ithaque.

=== Edited volumes ===
- (with Philippe de Rouilhan) Écrits posthumes de Frege (edition and translation of Nachlass). Nîmes, Éditions J. Chambon, 1999
- (with Pierre Thibaud) Œuvres philosophiques, Charles Sanders Peirce. Paris, Éditions du Cerf.

Œuvres 1: Pragmatisme et Pragmaticisme, 2002.
Œuvres 2: Pragmatisme et Sciences Normatives, 2003.
Œuvres 3: Écrits Logiques, 2006.
