= Alexandre Matheron =

French philosopher (1926–2020)

- Born: 27 July 1926; Paris, France
- Died: 7 January 2020 (aged 93); Paris, France

Education
- Education: École Normale Supérieure
- Doctoral advisor: Raymond Polin; Henri Gouhier
- Other advisor: Martial Gueroult

Philosophical work
- Era: Contemporary philosophy
- Region: Western philosophy
- School: Continental philosophy Spinozism
- Institutions: Paris X
- Main interests: History of philosophy Political philosophy Ethics

Alexandre Matheron (French: [matʁɔ̃]; 27 July 1926 – 7 January 2020) was a French philosopher specializing in Baruch Spinoza and modern political philosophy. His 1969 work Individu et communauté chez Spinoza is widely regarded as a landmark in Spinoza scholarship.

== Biography ==
Alexandre was the brother of mathematician Georges Matheron. He obtained a bachelor's degree in politics in 1949 and an agrégation in philosophy in 1956. The following year, he began teaching at the University of Algiers. He also left the French Communist Party, where he was very active. While in Algeria, Matheron decided to write his doctoral thesis on Spinoza.

In 1963, he returned to Paris and enrolled at the French National Centre for Scientific Research to complete his doctoral degree under the direction of Martial Gueroult. His degree was completed in 1968. His thesis, titled Individu et communauté chez Spinoza was officially published in 1969. Matheron published another work in 1971, titled Le Christ et le salut des Ignorants chez Spinoza. He was a founder in 1977 of the Association des Amis de Spinoza.

He worked as assistant professor at Paris Nanterre University, and then served as professor at Lumière University Lyon 2.

He died on 7 January 2020 after a period of ill health. His work was first published in English in 2020 as a collection of essays titled Politics, Ontology and Ethics in Spinoza: Essays by Alexandre Matheron.

== Publications ==
In French:

- Individu et communauté chez Spinoza (Paris: Les Éditions de Minuit, 1969) ISBN 2707303917
- Le Christ et le salut des Ignorants chez Spinoza (Paris: Éditions Aubier-Montaigne, 1971)
- Anthropologie et politique au XVIIe siècle. Études sur Spinoza (Paris: Vrin, 1985)
- Études sur Spinoza et les philosophies à l'âge classique (Lyon: ENS Lyon, 2011) ISBN 2847882189

In English:

- Politics, Ontology and Ethics in Spinoza: Essays by Alexandre Matheron, translated by Filippo Del Lucchese, David Maruzzella, and Gil Morejon. (Edinburgh: Edinburgh University Press, 2020) ISBN 147444010X
