= Institut Jean Nicod =

French research institute

Coordinates: 48.84293°N 2.34449°E

The Institut Jean Nicod (IJN) is an interdisciplinary research center based in Paris, France. Its current director is the philosopher Roberto Casati (2017-present), preceded by philosophers François Recanati (2010–2017) and Pierre Jacob (2002–2010). Created in 2002, its name commemorates the French philosopher, epistemologist and logician Jean Nicod (1893–1924). The IJN is jointly run by the Centre national de la recherche scientifique (CNRS), École normale supérieure (ENS) and École des Hautes Études en Sciences Sociales (EHESS), three French research and higher education institutions. Since 2007, the ENS hosts the IJN where it is affiliated with both the Département d'Etudes Cognitives (DEC), of which it is a founding member, and the Department of Philosophy.

Research carried out by its 33 permanent members (state 2016) has an interdisciplinary profile. In the tradition of analytic philosophy, this research center conducts research at the interface between cognitive science (mainly, philosophy of mind, philosophy of cognition, linguistics of cognition, psychology), social sciences (e.g. social epistemology, epistemic logic, cognitive anthropology and sociology, behavioural economics) and the humanities. Internally the IJN is broadly organized in three research themes: (1) Language, (2) Action, Perception and Self-Consciousness and (3) Social Cognition. Apart from being a European venue for scientifically oriented analytic philosophy, it is engaged in fostering this kind of work through national and international collaborations.

As of 2016, the IJN hosts 15 Master, 60 PhD and 24 visiting students (as well as 15 Post-Docs) taught and supervised by its members.

The IJN was the first French institution (and among the first in Europe) to embrace an open access policy with respect to its scientific output, providing full free access to its publications. The IJN hosts the scholarly journal Review of Philosophy and Psychology, formerly known as European Review of Philosophy, (Springer, 1994-), as well as the Jean Nicod Lectures series (MIT Press, 1995-). Every year, the IJN website provides information on the Jean Nicod Prize, awarded by the French CNRS to a leading philosopher of mind or philosophically oriented cognitive scientist.

== Notable people ==
Researchers based at the IJN have included several internationally renowned philosophers and cognitive scientists: Scott Atran, Nicolas Baumard, Alban Bouvier, Roberto Casati, Vincent Descombes, Jérôme Dokic, Jon Elster, Pascal Engel, Uriah Kriegel, Hugo Mercier, Daniel Nettle, Gloria Origgi, Joëlle Proust, François Recanati, Philippe Schlenker, Dan Sperber, Benjamin Spector, Isidora Stojanovic, Mouhamadou El Hady Ba, Coralie Chevallier.

== See also ==
- Jean Nicod
- Jean Nicod Prize
- Cognitive science (Consciousness)
- Linguistics (Psycholinguistics, Pragmatics, Semantics)
- Philosophy (Philosophy of mind, Philosophy of psychology)
- Social sciences (Sociology, Cognitive anthropology)
