= Continental philosophy =

Philosophical traditions from mainland Europe

Continental philosophy is a group of Western philosophies first prominent in 20th-century continental Europe that derive from a broadly Kantian tradition of focusing on the individual and society. Continental philosophy includes German idealism, phenomenology, philosophical pessimism, existentialism (and its antecedents, such as the thought of Kierkegaard and Nietzsche), hermeneutics, structuralism, post-structuralism, deconstruction, French feminism, psychoanalytic theory, posthumanism, speculative realism, and the critical theory of the Frankfurt School as well as some Freudian, Hegelian, and Western Marxist views.

There is no academic consensus on the definition of continental philosophy. Prior to the twentieth century, the term "continental" was used broadly to refer to philosophy from continental Europe. A slightly narrower use of the term originated among English-speaking philosophers since the second half of the 20th century, who use it as a convenient catch-all term to refer to a range of thinkers and traditions outside the movement known as analytic philosophy. The term continental philosophy may mark merely a family resemblance across disparate philosophical views; a similar argument has been made for analytic philosophy.

== Definition ==
The term continental philosophy, in the above sense, was first widely used by English-speaking philosophers to describe university courses in the 1970s, emerging as a collective name for the philosophies then widespread in France and Germany, such as phenomenology, existentialism, structuralism, and post-structuralism.

However, the term (and its approximate sense) can be found at least as early as 1840, in John Stuart Mill's 1840 essay on Coleridge, where Mill contrasts the Kantian-influenced thought of "Continental philosophy" and "Continental philosophers" with the English empiricism of Bentham and the 18th century generally. This notion gained prominence in the early 20th century as figures such as Bertrand Russell and G. E. Moore advanced a vision of philosophy closely allied with natural science, progressing through logical analysis. This tradition, which has come to be known broadly as analytic philosophy, became dominant in Britain and the United States from roughly 1930 onward. Russell and Moore made a dismissal of Hegelianism and its philosophical relatives a distinctive part of their new movement. Commenting on the history of the distinction in 1945, Russell distinguished "two schools of philosophy, which may be broadly distinguished as the Continental and the British respectively", a division he saw as operative "from the time of Locke"; Russell identifies the following broad distinctions between Continental and British philosophical traditions, respectively:

1. in method, deductive system-building vs. piecemeal induction;
2. in metaphysics, rationalist theology vs. metaphysical agnosticism;
3. in ethics, non-naturalist deontology vs. naturalist hedonism; and
4. in politics, authoritarianism vs. liberalism.

Since the 1970s, however, philosophers in the United States and Britain have taken an interest in continental philosophers since Kant, and the philosophical traditions in multiple European countries have similarly incorporated aspects of the "analytic" movement. Self-described analytic philosophy flourishes in France, including philosophers such as Jules Vuillemin, Vincent Descombes, Gilles Gaston Granger, François Recanati, and Pascal Engel. Likewise, self-described "continental philosophers" can be found in philosophy departments in the United Kingdom, North America, and Australia. "Continental philosophy" is thus defined in terms of a family of philosophical traditions and influences rather than a geographic distinction. The issue of geographical specificity has been raised again more recently in post-colonial and decolonial approaches to "continental philosophy", which critically examine the ways that European imperial and colonial projects have influenced academic knowledge production. For this reason, Nelson Maldonado-Torres has advocated for "post-continental philosophy" as an outgrowth of continental philosophy.

=== Characteristics ===
The term continental philosophy, like analytic philosophy, lacks a clear definition and may mark merely a family resemblance across disparate philosophical views. Simon Glendinning has suggested that the term was originally more pejorative than descriptive, functioning as a label for types of western philosophy rejected or disliked by analytic philosophers. Nonetheless, Michael E. Rosen has ventured to identify common themes that typically characterize continental philosophy. The themes derive from a broadly Kantian thesis that knowledge, experience, and reality are bound and shaped by conditions best understood through philosophical reflection rather than exclusively empirical inquiry.

1. Continental philosophers generally reject the view that the natural sciences are the only or most accurate way of understanding natural phenomena. This contrasts with a number of analytic philosophers who consider their inquiries as continuous with, or subordinate to, those of the natural sciences. Continental philosophers often argue that science depends upon a "pre-theoretical substrate of experience" (a version of Kantian conditions of possible experience or the phenomenological "lifeworld") and that scientific methods are inadequate to fully understand such conditions of intelligibility.
2. Continental philosophy usually considers these conditions of possible experience as variable: determined at least partly by factors such as context, space and time, language, culture, or history. Thus continental philosophy tends toward historicism (or historicity). Where analytic philosophy tends to treat philosophy in terms of discrete problems, capable of being analyzed apart from their historical origins (much as scientists consider the history of science inessential to scientific inquiry), continental philosophy typically suggests that "philosophical argument cannot be divorced from the textual and contextual conditions of its historical emergence."
3. Continental philosophy typically holds that human agency can change these conditions of possible experience: "if human experience is a contingent creation, then it can be recreated in other ways." Thus continental philosophers tend to take a strong interest in the unity of theory and practice, and often see their philosophical inquiries as closely related to personal, moral, or political transformation. This tendency is clear in the Marxist tradition ("philosophers have only interpreted the world, in various ways; the point, however, is to change it"), but is also central in existentialism and post-structuralism.
4. A final characteristic trait of continental philosophy is an emphasis on metaphilosophy. In the wake of the development and success of the natural sciences, continental philosophers have often sought to redefine the method and nature of philosophy. In some cases (such as German idealism or phenomenology), this manifests as a renovation of the traditional view that philosophy is the first, foundational, a priori science. In other cases (such as hermeneutics, critical theory, or structuralism), it is held that philosophy investigates a domain that is irreducibly cultural or practical. And some continental philosophers (such as Kierkegaard, Nietzsche, or later Heidegger) doubt whether any conception of philosophy can coherently achieve its stated goals.

== History ==
The history of continental philosophy (taken in the narrower sense of "late modern / contemporary continental philosophy") is usually thought to begin with German idealism. Led by figures like Fichte, Schelling, and later Hegel, German idealism developed out of the work of Immanuel Kant in the 1780s and 1790s and was closely linked with romanticism and the revolutionary politics of the Enlightenment. Besides the central figures listed above, important contributors to German idealism also included Friedrich Heinrich Jacobi, Gottlob Ernst Schulze, Karl Leonhard Reinhold, and Friedrich Schleiermacher.

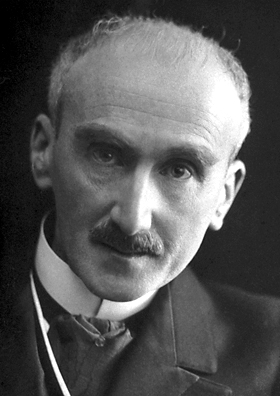
Henri Bergson

As the institutional roots of "continental philosophy" in multiple cases directly descend from those of phenomenology, (Note: E.g., the largest academic organization devoted to furthering the study of continental philosophy is the Society for Phenomenology and Existential Philosophy.) Edmund Husserl has always been a canonical figure in continental philosophy. Nonetheless, Husserl is also a respected subject of study in the analytic tradition. Husserl's notion of a noema, the non-psychological content of thought, his correspondence with Gottlob Frege, and his investigations into the nature of logic continue to generate interest among analytic philosophers.

J. G. Merquior argued that a distinction between analytic and continental philosophies can be first clearly identified with Henri Bergson (1859–1941), whose wariness of science and elevation of intuition paved the way for existentialism. Merquior wrote: "the most prestigious philosophizing in France took a very dissimilar path [from the Anglo-Germanic analytic schools]. One might say it all began with Henri Bergson."

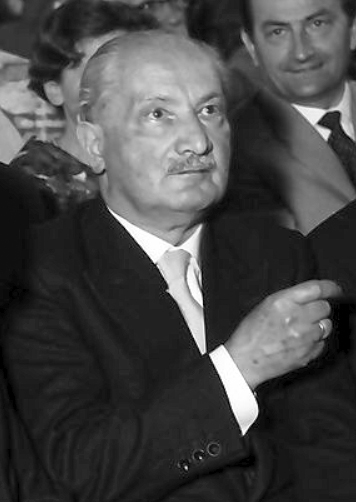
Martin Heidegger

An illustration of some important differences between analytic and continental styles of philosophy can be found in Rudolf Carnap's "Elimination of Metaphysics through Logical Analysis of Language" (1932; "Überwindung der Metaphysik durch Logische Analyse der Sprache"), a paper some observers have described as particularly polemical. Carnap's paper argues that Heidegger's lecture "What Is Metaphysics?" violates logical syntax to create nonsensical pseudo-statements. Moreover, Carnap claimed that a number of German metaphysicians of the era were similar to Heidegger in writing statements that were syntactically meaningless.

=== 19th-century German philosophy ===
Other major theorists and philosophers during this period include Sigmund Freud and Friedrich Nietzsche, whose work decisively influenced the Continental tradition. Sigmund Freud was an Austrian neurologist and the founder of psychoanalysis. His theoretical framework became very influential in twentieth-century continental philosophy, critical theory, and cultural analysis. Friedrich Nietzsche was a German philosopher whose radical critique of morality, truth, and metaphysics made him one of the most decisive figures in Continental philosophy, especially his influence on existentialism, phenomenology, and post-structuralism.

With the rise of Nazism, a number of Germany's philosophers, especially those of Jewish descent or leftist or liberal political sympathies (such as many in the Vienna Circle and the Frankfurt School), fled to the English-speaking world. Those philosophers who remained—if they remained in academia at all—had to reconcile themselves to Nazi control of the universities. Others, such as Martin Heidegger, among the most prominent German philosophers to stay in Germany, aligned themselves with Nazism when it came to power.

=== 20th-century French philosophy ===
Both before and after World War II there was a growth of interest in German philosophy in France. A new interest in communism translated into an interest in Marx and Hegel, who became for the first time studied extensively in the politically conservative French university system of the Third Republic. At the same time the phenomenological philosophy of Husserl and Heidegger became increasingly influential, perhaps owing to its resonances with French philosophies which placed great stock in the first-person perspective (an idea found in divergent forms such as Cartesianism, spiritualism, and Bergsonism). Most important in this popularization of phenomenology was the author and philosopher Jean-Paul Sartre, who called his philosophy existentialism.

Another major strain of continental thought is structuralism/post-structuralism. Influenced by the structural linguistics of Ferdinand de Saussure, French anthropologists such as Claude Lévi-Strauss began to apply the structural paradigm to the humanities. Jacques Lacan, the French psychoanalyst, is also influenced by Saussurean linguistics. In the 1960s and '70s, post-structuralists developed various critiques of structuralism. Post-structuralist thinkers include Michel Foucault, Jacques Derrida and Gilles Deleuze. After this wave, most of the late 20th century, the tradition has been carried into the 21st century by Quentin Meillassoux, Tristan Garcia, Francois Laruelle, and others.

=== Recent Anglo-American developments ===
From the early 20th century until the 1960s, continental philosophers were only intermittently discussed in British and American universities, despite an influx of continental philosophers, particularly German Jewish students of Nietzsche and Heidegger, to the United States on account of the persecution of the Jews and later World War II; Hannah Arendt, Herbert Marcuse, Leo Strauss, Theodor W. Adorno, and Walter Kaufmann are probably the most notable of this wave, arriving in the late 1930s and early 1940s. Recent Anglo-American developments gained far greater visibility through influential theorists such as Slavoj Žižek, who drew on Hegel, Marx, and Lacanian psychoanalysis to develop a critique of ideology, and Judith Butler, whose work in feminist philosophy and queer theory, shaped by post-structuralism and the legacy of Foucault, became central to debates on subjectivity, power, and performativity.

== Contrast with analytic philosophy ==
The "analytic–continental divide" is a term used to describe a perceived schism within 20th–21st century Western philosophy. This divide has traditionally been understood in terms of differences in methodology, subject matter, historical or geographical development, or foundational beliefs as described above. 21st century debate on the divide often focuses not on the specifics or definitions of each tradition, but rather on whether these distinctions remain justifiable and constructive for understanding and participating in current philosophical practice. In the canons of analytic and continental philosophy, there are subfields with next to no cross-pollination with the other tradition—philosophy of mind amongst analytic thinkers and phenomenology among continental thinkers for example—leading to the idea that the labels retain some truth despite potentially overgeneralizing. Despite the ideological validity of the divide being questioned, the distinction remains particularly relevant to the organization of philosophy in academia where journal publications and university departments often identify as either continental or analytic. Anglo-American universities are overwhelmingly analytic while naturally many universities in Germany and France are continental focused.

Despite the persistence of the divide in many ways, the boundaries separating analytic and continental philosophy, particularly in the identification of university departments, have increasingly eroded as more programs feature a pluralistic approach. Philosophy of science has also become increasingly popular and started to become the primary focus in some programs, diminishing a binary distinction.

The prevalence of the analytic–continental divide in university programs is part of the reason William Blattner contends that the division is not deeply rooted in ideological or methodological differences, but rather sociological and academic-political factors. He argues that many of the authors most commonly associated with continental philosophy have "nothing in common methodologically, stylistically, or doctrinally." And, that the logical or scientific characteristic often attributed to analytic philosophy fails as some "continental" philosophers such as Edmund Husserl were interested in mathematics and frequently used logical tools while many "analytic" philosophers discussing ethics, political philosophy, or literature did not. Blattner also points to work bridging the divide such as Martin Heidegger and other traditionally continental philosophers being used in artificial intelligence research work and a revival of interest in pragmatism.

== See also ==
- Index of continental philosophy articles
- Transcontinental philosophy
