= Jean Cavaillès =

French philosopher and logician (1903–1944)

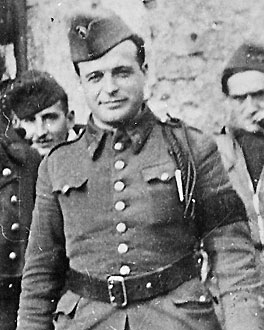
- Born: 15 May 1903; Saint-Maixent, France
- Died: 4 April 1944 (aged 40); Arras, France

Education
- Education: École Normale Supérieure; University of Paris
- Doctoral advisor: Léon Brunschvicg

Philosophical work
- Era: 20th-century philosophy
- Region: Western philosophy
- School: Continental philosophy French historical epistemology
- Institutions: University of Strasbourg; École Normale Supérieure
- Notable students: Jean-Toussaint Desanti, Gilles-Gaston Granger, Jules Vuillemin
- Main interests: Philosophy of mathematics
- Notable ideas: Philosophy of the concept, dialectic of the concept

Jean Cavaillès (/kɑːvaɪˈɛs/; French: [ʒɑ̃ kavajɛs]; 15 May 1903 – 4 April 1944) was a French philosopher and logician who specialized in philosophy of mathematics and philosophy of science. He took part in the French Resistance within the Libération movement and was arrested by the Gestapo on 17 February 1944 and shot on 4 April 1944.

== Early life and education ==
Cavaillès was born in Saint-Maixent, Deux-Sèvres. After passing his first baccalauréat in 1919 and baccalauréats in mathematics and philosophy the following year, he studied at the Lycée Louis-le-Grand, including two years of classes préparatoires, before entering the École Normale Supérieure in 1923, reading philosophy. In 1927 he passed the agrégation competitive exam. He began graduate studies in philosophy in 1928 under the supervision of Léon Brunschvicg. Cavaillès won a Rockefeller Foundation scholarship in 1929–1930. In 1931 he travelled extensively in Germany; in Göttingen he conceived, jointly with Emmy Noether, the project of publishing the Cantor-Dedekind correspondence. He was a teaching assistant at the École Normale Supérieure between 1929 and 1935, then teacher at the lycée d'Amiens (now lycée Louis-Thuillier) in 1936. In 1937, he successfully defended his doctoral theses at the University of Paris and became a Doctor of Letters in Philosophy. He was then appointed maître de conférences in Logic and in General Philosophy at the University of Strasbourg.

== World War II ==
After the outbreak of World War II, he was mobilized in 1939 as an infantry lieutenant with the 43rd Regiment and was later attached to the Staff of the 4th Colonial Division. He was honoured for bravery twice and was captured on 11 June 1940. At the end of July 1940 he escaped from Belgium and fled to Clermont-Ferrand, where the university of Strasbourg was re-organized.

At the end of December 1940, he met Emmanuel d'Astier de la Vigerie with whom he created a small group of resistance fighters, known as "the Last Column". To reach a broader audience, they created a newspaper which was to become Libération. It served as the mouthpiece of both Libération-Sud and Libération-Nord. Cavaillès took an active part in editing the paper. The first edition appeared in July 1941.

In 1941, he was appointed professor at the Sorbonne and left Clermont-Ferrand for Paris, where he helped form the Libération-Nord resistance group, becoming part of its management committee.

In April 1942, at the instigation of Christian Pineau, the central Office of Information and Action (BCRA) of London charged him with the task of forming an intelligence network in the Northern Zone, known as "Cohors". He was ordered by Christian Pineau to pass into the Southern Zone, and Cavaillès headed the network and formed similar groups in Belgium and the north of France.

In September 1942 he was arrested with Pineau in Narbonne by the French police. After a failed escape attempt to London, he was interned in Montpellier at the Saint-Paul d' Eyjeaux prison camp from where he escaped at the end of December 1942. The book Cavaillès wrote in prison in Montpellier in 1942 was published posthumously in 1946, edited by the epistemologist Georges Canguilhem and the mathematician Charles Ehresmann under the title Sur la logique et la theorie de la science.

Denounced as a public enemy by the Vichy regime and sought by the police, he fled clandestinely to London in February 1943. There he met General Charles de Gaulle on several occasions.

Back in France on 15 April he resigned from the management Committee of the Libération movement in order to dedicate himself entirely to direct action. He was in charge of the sabotage of the stores of the Kriegsmarine in Brittany and German radio installations on the coast.

Betrayed by one of his liaison officers, he was arrested on 28 August 1943 in Paris with his sister and his brother-in-law. Tortured, imprisoned in Fresnes then in Compiègne, he was transferred to the Citadel from Arras and was reported as being executed there on 17 February 1944. New research in 2015 revealed this date was incorrect and he was sentenced and executed on 4 April 1944.

Buried at first in Arras under a wooden cross marked "unknown n°5", his body was exhumed in 1946 to be buried in the Crypt at the Sorbonne in Paris.

== Legacy ==
The Centre Cavaillès de l'École Normale Supérieure was established in Paris in 1969, at 29 rue d'Ulm, as Centre for the Study of the History and Philosophy of Science. At the formal opening, philosopher Georges Canguilhem said, "A philosopher-mathematician loaded with explosives, lucid and reckless, resolute without optimism. If that's not a hero, what is a hero?" (Translated from the original French language: "Un philosophe mathématicien bourré d'explosifs, un lucide téméraire, un résolu sans optimisme. Si ce n'est pas un héros, qu'est-ce qu'un héros ?")

Cavaillès is honored in the Heroes of the Resistance postage stamp set.

In L'Armée des ombres, a 1969 film directed by Jean-Pierre Melville, the character of Luc Jardie (the Chief) was in part inspired by Cavaillès. Jardie's chief operative, recuperating from injuries in a hideaway, has only five books; the title of each is a publication of Cavaillès, though the author is shown as "Luc Jardie."

=== Military honours ===
- Chevalier de la Légion d'honneur
- Compagnon de la Libération – decree of 20 November 1944
- Croix de Guerre 39/45
- Médaille de la Résistance
- Officier de l'Ordre de la Couronne de Belgique (avec palme)
- Médaille de la Résistance (Belgique)

== Works ==
- Sur la deuxième définition des ensemble finis donnée par Dedekind [On the second definition of finite sets given by Dedekind], Fundamenta Mathematicae, XIX, 1932, pp. 143–148.
- L'école de Vienne au Congrès de Prague, Revue de métaphysique et de morale, XLII, 1935, pp. 137–149.
- Briefwechsel Cantor-Dedekind, ed. by E. Noether and J. Cavaillès, Actualités scientifiques et industrielles, 518, Paris, Hermann, 1937. French translation by Charles Ehresmann in Cavaillès, Philosophie mathématique, Paris, Hermann, 1962, pp. 177–252.
- Remarques sur la formation de la théorie abstraite des ensembles [Remarks on the formation of abstract set theory], Actualités scientifiques et industrielles, 606 & 607, Paris, Hermann, 1938. Reprinted in Cavaillès, Philosophie mathématique, Paris, Hermann, 1962, pp. 23–176.
- Méthode axiomatique et formalisme [Axiomatic method and formalism], Actualités scientifiques et industrielles, 608, 609 & 610, Paris, Hermann, 1938.
- Du collectif au pari [From the collective to the bet], Revue de métaphysique et de morale, XLVII, 1940, pp. 139–163.
- La pensée mathématique [Mathematical thought], discussion with Albert Lautman (February 4, 1939), Bulletin de la Société française de philosophie, XL, 1946.
- Transfini et continu [Transfinite and continuum], Actualités scientifiques et industrielles, 1020, Paris, Hermann, 1947. Reprinted in Cavaillès, Philosophie mathématique, Paris, Hermann, 1962, pp. 253–274.
- Sur la logique et la théorie de la science [On logic and the theory of science], Paris, Presses universitaires de France, 1947. English translation by T. S. Kisiel in J. Kockelmans and T. Kisiel (eds), Phenomenology and the Natural Sciences, Evanston, Northwestern University Press, 1970.
- Philosophie mathématique [Mathematical philosophy], Paris, Hermann, 1962.
- Œuvres complètes de philosophie des sciences [Complete works in philosophy of the sciences], Paris, Hermann, 1994.

'English translations’

- A Cavailles and Canguilhem reader: an introduction to the French philosophy and history of science, trans. Camille Akmut. 76 pages.
