= Oratio obliqua (philosophy) =

Oratio obliqua (or indirect speech) is a topic in modern philosophy, considered to be a variety of the wider topic of metarepresentation. In recent years it has been made prominent by the works especially of the French philosopher François Recanati.

== Bibliography ==
- De Brabanter, Philippe (2010). "The Semantics and Pragmatics of Hybrid Quotations". Wiley Online Library.
- De Brabanter, Philippe (2013). "François Recanati's radical pragmatic theory of quotation". Teorema: International Journal of Philosophy 32 (2):109-128. (Contains further bibliography.)
- Künne, Wolfgang (2015). "Frege on That-Clauses" In: Weiss, Bernhard (ed.) Dummett on Analytical Philosophy, pp. 135–173.
- Ludwig, Kirk. Review: François Recanati's "Oratio Obliqua, Oratio Recta: An Essay on Metarepresentation". Philosophy and Phenomenological Research, Vol. 66, No. 2 (Mar., 2003), pp. 481–488. (Also on JSTOR.)
- Prior, A. N.; Kenny, A. (1963). "Oratio Obliqua". Aristotelian Society Supplementary Volume, Volume 37, Issue 1, 14 July 1963, pp. 115–146.
- Recanati, François (2000). Oratio Obliqua, Oratio Recta: An Essay on Metarepresentation. MIT Press.
- Recanati, François (2003). "Oratio Obliqua, Oratio Recta: An Essay on Metarepresentation". Philosophical Review 111(3), January 2003. (A summary of Recanati's book.)
