= Martial Gueroult =

French philosopher (1891–1976)

- Born: 15 December 1891; Le Havre, France
- Died: 13 August 1976 (aged 84); Paris, France

Education
- Education: École Normale Supérieure; University of Strasbourg (PhD, 1930)
- Academic advisor: Émile Bréhier

Philosophical work
- Era: 20th-century philosophy
- Region: Western philosophy
- School: Continental philosophy Spinozism
- Institutions: University of Strasbourg; University of São Paulo; Collège de France
- Doctoral students: Ginette Dreyfus
- Notable students: Gilles-Gaston Granger; Alexandre Matheron; Jules Vuillemin
- Main interests: History of philosophy, philosophy of history, metaphysics
- Notable ideas: Conditions of possibility of a history of philosophy in general

Martial Gueroult (French: [ɡeʁu]; 15 December 1891 – 13 August 1976) was a French philosopher. His primary areas of research were in 17th- and 18th-century philosophy as well as the history of philosophy.

== Biography ==
Gueroult was born on 15 December 1891 in the city of Le Havre in northwestern France. A veteran of both the First and Second World Wars, he was awarded the Légion d’Honneur [Legion of Honour] and twice with the Croix de Guerre [Cross of War]. It was during his time as a prisoner of war in Germany that Gueroult began drafting his first philosophical work on Johann Gottlieb Fichte, later to become L'Évolution et la structure de la doctrine de la science chez Fichte [The Evolution and Structure of Fichte’s Doctrine of Science].

Gueroult's first academic appointment was to the University of Strasbourg. In the 1930s, Gueroult spent some time at the University of São Paulo in Brazil where he worked along with other French intellectuals such as Roger Bastide, Claude Lévi-Strauss, Pierre Monbeig and Ferdinand Braudel to develop the newly founded university's social science programs. He would return to France to accept a position at the Sorbonne but in 1951, was named successor to Étienne Gilson at the Collège de France. Gueroult re-titled his position as "Histoire et technologie des systèmes philosophiques" ["History and Technology of Philosophical Systems"] and it is here he would remain until his retirement in 1962.

== Thought ==
Gueroult's work was characterized by a close attention to the history of philosophy—which he considered as noble as philosophy itself—as well as a strong demand for systematicity. He also refused philosophical recourse to transcendence. A polemical debate opposed him to Ferdinand Alquié concerning Descartes, as Gueroult was studying him "according to the order of reasons" (synchronically), while Alquié was more interested in his historical evolution, studying him diachronically. Gueroult was interested in the "conditions of possibility of a history of philosophy in general". He died before completing his opus titled Dianoématique, which was composed of two books, the first one being titled History of the History of Philosophy and the second one Philosophy of the History of Philosophy. The second volume asked the question: how is a history of philosophy possible, given that philosophy aims at studying eternal truths, and that history is a school of skepticism?

== Significance ==
Gueroult's influence has primarily been confined to France, where his works have come to be seen as classics in the history of philosophy. He was highly influential on the thought of 20th-century French thinkers such as Maurice Merleau-Ponty, Jules Vuillemin, Michel Foucault, Pierre Bourdieu, Gilles Deleuze and Geneviève Rodis-Lewis.

== Bibliography ==
Books

- L’Antidogmatisme de Kant et de Fichte. [The Anti-Dogmatism of Kant and Fichte] 1920.
- L’Évolution et la structure de la doctrine de la science chez Fichte. [The Evolution and Structure of Fichte’s Doctrine of Science] Paris: Les Belles-Lettres, 1930.
- La Philosophie transcendentale de Salomon Maimon. [The Transcendental Philosophy of Salomon Maimon] Paris: Presses Universitaires, 1931.
- Leibniz: Dynamique et métaphysique; suivi d'une note sur le principe de la moindre action chez Maupertuis. [Leibniz: Dynamics and Metaphysics; Followed by A Note on The Principle of Least Action in Maupertuis] Paris: Les Belles-Lettres, 1939.
- Étendue et psychologie chez Malebranche. [Extension and Psychology in Malebranche] Paris: Les Belles-Lettres, 1939.
- Descartes selon l'ordre des raisons, T. 1: L'Âme et Dieu et T. 2: L'Âme et le corps. Paris: Aubier-Montaigne, 1953. (Roger Ariew, trans. Descartes’ Philosophy Interpreted According to the Order of Reason, T. 1: The Soul and God and T. 2: The Soul and the Body. Minneapolis: University of Minnesota Press, 1984–1985).
- Nouvelles réflexions sur la preuve ontologique de Descartes. [New Reflections on Descartes’ Ontological Proof] Paris: J. Vrin, 1955.
- Berkeley: Quatre études sur la perception et sur Dieu. [Berkeley: Four Studies on Perception and God] 1956.
- Malebranche, T. 1: La vision en Dieu, T. 2: Les cinq abîmes de la Providence; A. L’ordre et l’occasionalisme et B. La nature et la grâce [Malebranche, T. 1: Vision in God, T. 2: The Five Chasms of Providence; A. Order and Occasionalism and B. Nature and Grace] Paris: Aubier-Montaigne, 1955–1959.
- Etudes sur Descartes, Spinoza, Malebranche et Leibniz. [Studies on Descartes, Spinoza, Malebranche and Leibniz] New York: George Olms, 1970.
- Spinoza, T.1: Dieu (Éthique, I) et T.2: L'Âme (Éthique, II). [Spinoza, T.1: God (Ethics, I) and T.2: The Soul (Ethics, II)] Paris: Aubier-Montaigne, 1968–1974.
- Études sur Fichte. [Studies on Fichte] 1979.
- Dianoématique, T. 1: Histoire de l'histoire de la philosophie (Vol. 1: En Occident, des origines jusqu'à Condillac [1984], Vol. 2: En Allemagne, de Leibniz à nos jours [1988], Vol. 3: En France, de Condorcet à nos jours, [1988]) et T. 2: Philosophie de l'histoire de la philosophie [1979]. [ Dianoematics, T. 1: History of The History of Philosophy (Vol. 1: In The West, From Its Beginnings to Condillac [1984], Vol. 2: In Germany, From Leibniz to Our Days [1988], Vol. 3: In France, From Condorcet to Our Days) and T. 2: Philosophy of the History of Philosophy [1979] ] 1979–1984.

Articles

- "Nature humaine et état de nature chez Rousseau, Kant et Fichte." ["Human Nature and The State of Nature in Rousseau, Kant and Fichte"] Cahiers pour l’Analyse 6 (1967): 2–19.
- "The History of Philosophy as a Philosophical Problem." The Monist 53 (1969): 563–587.
- "Spinoza’s Letter on the Infinite (Letter XII, to Louis Meyer)." In Spinoza: A Collection of Critical Essays, edited by Marjorie Grene and translated by Kathleen McLaughlin, 182–212. New York: Doubleday, 1973. Originally published in Martial Gueroult, "Appendice Nº 9: La lettre sur l’infini (Lettre XII, à Louis Meyer)," Spinoza, T.1: Dieu (Éthique, I), 500–528 (Paris: Aubier-Montaigne, 1968).
- "The Metaphysics and Physics of Force in Descartes." In Descartes: Philosophy, Mathematics and Physics, edited by Stephen Gaukroger, 196–229. Sussex: Harvester Press, 1980.
