= Review of Philosophy and Psychology =

- Discipline: Philosophy, Psychology, Cognitive Science
- Language: English
- Edited by: Paul Egré

Publication details
- Former name: European Review of Philosophy
- History: 1994–2009 (European Review of Philosophy), 2010–present
- Publisher: Springer
- Frequency: Quarterly

Standard abbreviations
- ISO 4: Rev. Philos. Psychol.

Indexing
- ISSN: 1878-5158 (print); 1878-5166 (web)

Links
- Journal homepage

The Review of Philosophy and Psychology is a peer-reviewed academic journal published by Springer that focuses on philosophical and foundational issues in cognitive science. The journal is hosted at the Jean Nicod Institute (Paris), a research center of the French National Centre for Scientific Research (CNRS).

== History ==
The journal started publication in 1994 as European Review of Philosophy (ISSN 1098-7274). Under its former name, it was published by Stanford University's CSLI Publications and distributed by the University of Chicago Press. It was renamed to its current title in 2010 and volume numbering was started at 1 again.

== Notable articles ==
- "Red, Bitter, Good" (1996) - Peter Railton
- "The Dynamics of Situations" (1997) - François Recanati
- "Rip Van Winkle and Other Characters" (1997) - John Perry
- "The Essence of Response-Dependence" (1998) - Ralph Wedgewood

== See also ==
- List of philosophy journals
- List of psychology journals
