= Gloria Origgi =

Italian philosopher (born 1967)

Gloria Origgi (born 1967) is an Italian philosopher at the CNRS in Paris (Institut Jean Nicod) who works on the theory of mind, epistemology and social sciences applied to new technology. She is the founder (in 2002) and director of the innovative project, a portal where many international virtual conferences in the social and cognitive sciences are being organized.

She is the author of the book 'Reputation', published by Princeton University Press in 2017.

Gloria Origgi has previously published a book on the American philosopher Willard Van Orman Quine, Introduzione a Quine, Laterza, 2000. She has edited the collection of essays Text-e. Text in the age of the Internet, Palgrave, 2006, based on a web conference that she co-organized with Noga Arikha and the research team of the library of the Centre Georges Pompidou in Paris (contributors include Umberto Eco, Jason Epstein, Dan Sperber and Theodore Zeldin). She has published numerous articles on social epistemology and cultural issues in English, French and Italian. Among her books: Qu'est-ce que la confiance? VRIN, 2008; La réputation, PUF 2015 (translated into Italian and into English); and La verité est une question politique, published by Albin Michel in 2024.

Her first work in Italian, La Figlia della Gallina Nera was published in Italy by Nottetempo (2008). She also writes for various newspapers and cultural magazines such as Il Fatto Quotidiano, MicroMega, Il Sole 24 Ore.

== See also ==
- Institut Jean Nicod
