= Joëlle Proust =

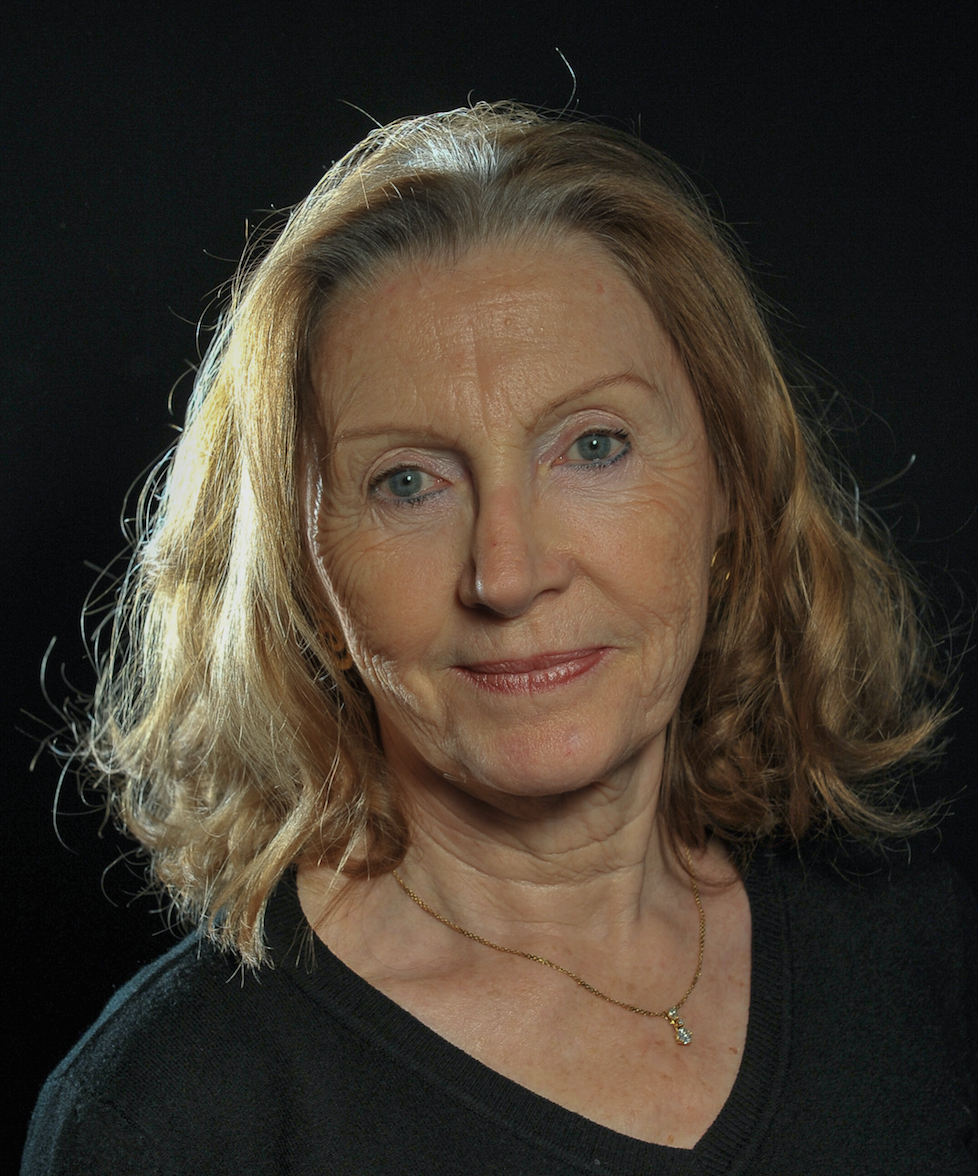
Image of Joelle

Joëlle Proust (born 1947) is a French philosopher and emeritus research director at the CNRS. She is a member of the Institut Jean Nicod and, since 2018, of the École normale supérieure.

== Awards and honors ==
- 1987 Médaille de bronze du CNRS for her book Questions de forme
- 2009 : She was made a member of the Comité national d'éthique sur l'expérimentation animale
- 2011 : She was made a senior scholar Conseil Européen de la Recherche (projet DIVIDNORM)
- 2016 : She was made a member of the Académie internationale de philosophie des sciences
- 2018 : She was made a member of the Conseil scientifique de l'Éducation nationale

== Publications ==
- Questions de forme. Logique et proposition analytique de Kant à Carnap, Fayard, 1987.
- Épistémologie et Cognition, D. Andler, P. Jacob, J. Proust, F. Récanati et D. Sperber (dir.), Mardaga, 1992.
- La connaissance philosophique. Essais sur la philosophie de Gilles-Gaston Granger, J. Proust et É. Schwartz (dir.), PUF, 1995 ISBN 2 13 046462 9.
- Comment l’esprit vient aux bêtes, Essai sur la représentation, Gallimard, 1997.
- Perception et intermodalité. Approches actuelles de la question de Molyneux. Presses Universitaires de France, 1997.
- Subjectivité et conscience d’agir : approches clinique et cognitive de la psychose, H. Grivois et J. Proust (dir.), Presses Universitaires de France, 1998.
- Simulation and knowledge of action, J. Dokic et J. Proust (dir.), Benjamins, 2002.
- Vocabulaire des Sciences Cognitives, O. Houdé, D. Kayser, O. König, J Proust, et F. Rastier (dir.), Paris, PUF, 1998 (édition révisée Quadrige), 2003.
- Les animaux pensent-ils ? (Bayard, 2003, 2^{e} édition: 2010)
- La philosophie cognitive, Pacherie, E. et Proust, J. (dir.), coll. Cogniprisme, Ophrys, 2004.
- La Nature de la volonté, Éditions Gallimard, Paris, 2005 ISBN 2-07042-440-5.
- Philosophy of Metacognition: mental agency and self-awareness, Oxford University Press, 2013.
- Foundations of Metacognition, M. Beran, J. Brandl, J. Perner, & J. Proust (dir.), Oxford University Press, 2012.
- Metacognitive Diversity: Interdisciplinary approaches. J.Proust et M. Fortier (dir.), Oxford University Press, 2018.
- Penser vite ou penser bien ? Ed. Odile Jacob, 2021.
