= Jean Vuillemin =

French computer scientist

Jean Vuillemin (born May 22, 1947, Pontarlier, France, died May 25, 2026, Paris, France) was a computer scientist known for his work in data structures and parallel computing. He was a professor of computer science at the École normale supérieure (Paris).

He was born of Suzanne Vuillemin (née Pagnier) and French philosopher Jules Vuillemin.

== Contributions ==
Vuillemin invented the binomial heap^{[B]} and Cartesian tree data structures.^{[C]} With Ron Rivest, he proved one of the Aanderaa–Rosenberg conjectures, according to which any deterministic algorithm that tests a nontrivial monotone property of graphs, using queries that test whether pairs of vertices are adjacent, must perform a quadratic number of adjacency queries.^{[A]}

In the 1980s, Vuillemin was the director of a project to develop a workstation using VLSI technology, under which the Le Lisp programming language was developed. With Franco P. Preparata, he also introduced the cube-connected cycles as a network topology in parallel computing.^{[D]}

== Education and career ==
Vuillemin earned an engineering degree at the École Polytechnique in 1968, a doctorate (troisième cycle) at the University of Paris in 1969, a Ph.D. from Stanford University in 1972 under the supervision of Zohar Manna, and a state doctorate from Paris Diderot University in 1974.

He became an assistant professor at the University of California, Berkeley in 1974, but then returned to France in 1975 for a position at the University of Paris-Sud. He moved to the École Polytechnique in 1982, to the Ecole de Management Léonard De Vinci in 1994, and to the École normale supérieure in 1997.

== Selected publications ==
A.	Rivest, Ronald L.; Vuillemin, Jean (1975), "A generalization and proof of the Aanderaa–Rosenberg conjecture", Proc. 7th ACM Symposium on Theory of Computing, pp. 6–11, doi:10.1145/800116.803747

B.	Vuillemin, Jean (April 1978), "A data structure for manipulating priority queues", Communications of the ACM, 21 (4): 309–314, doi:10.1145/359460.359478

C.	Vuillemin, Jean (1980), "A unifying look at data structures", Communications of the ACM, 23 (4): 229–239, doi:10.1145/358841.358852

D.	Preparata, Franco P.; Vuillemin, Jean (1981), "The cube-connected cycles: a versatile network for parallel computation", Communications of the ACM, 24 (5): 300–309, doi:10.1145/358645.358660, hdl:2142/74219
