= Daniel Nettle =

British researcher (born 1970)

Daniel Nettle (born 1970) is a scientist, writer and publisher. His scientific research often draws on evolutionary biology and anthropology, and addresses social, cultural, economic and political questions. After obtaining a BA in Psychology and Philosophy at Oxford University, Nettle went on to complete a PhD in Biological Anthropology at University College London. He is a CNRS senior researcher at the Institut Jean Nicod, an interdisciplinary research institute associated with the Ecole Normale Superieure and EHESS in Paris. He was President of European Human Behaviour and Evolution Association (EHBEA) from 2013 to 2016. Nettle is the author or co-author of a large number of articles in peer-reviewed academic journals, many of which are available open access, as well as eleven books.

Nettle is the founder and publisher of Éditions Croulebarbe, which publishes non-fiction titles.
