= Nicod's axiom =

In logic, Nicod's axiom (named after the French logician and philosopher Jean Nicod) is a formula that can be used as the sole axiom of a semantically complete system of propositional calculus. The only connective used in the formulation of Nicod's axiom is the Sheffer's stroke.

The axiom has the following form:$((\varphi\ |\ (\chi\ |\ \psi))\ |\ ((\tau\ |\ (\tau\ |\ \tau))\ |\ ((\theta\ |\ \chi)\ |\ ((\varphi\ |\ \theta)\ |\ (\varphi\ |\ \theta)))))$

Nicod showed that the whole propositional logic of Principia Mathematica could be derived from this axiom alone by using one rule of inference, called "Nicod's modus ponens":

$\begin{array}{l}\varphi \\ (\varphi\ |\ (\chi\ |\ \psi)) \\ \hline \psi \end{array}$

In 1931, the Polish logician Mordechaj Wajsberg discovered an equally powerful and easier-to-work-with alternative:

$((\varphi\ |\ (\psi\ |\ \chi))\ |\ (((\tau\ |\ \chi)\ |\ ((\varphi\ |\ \tau)\ |\ (\varphi\ |\ \tau)))\ |\ (\varphi\ |\ (\varphi\ |\ \psi))))$
