= Épenoy =

- Commune
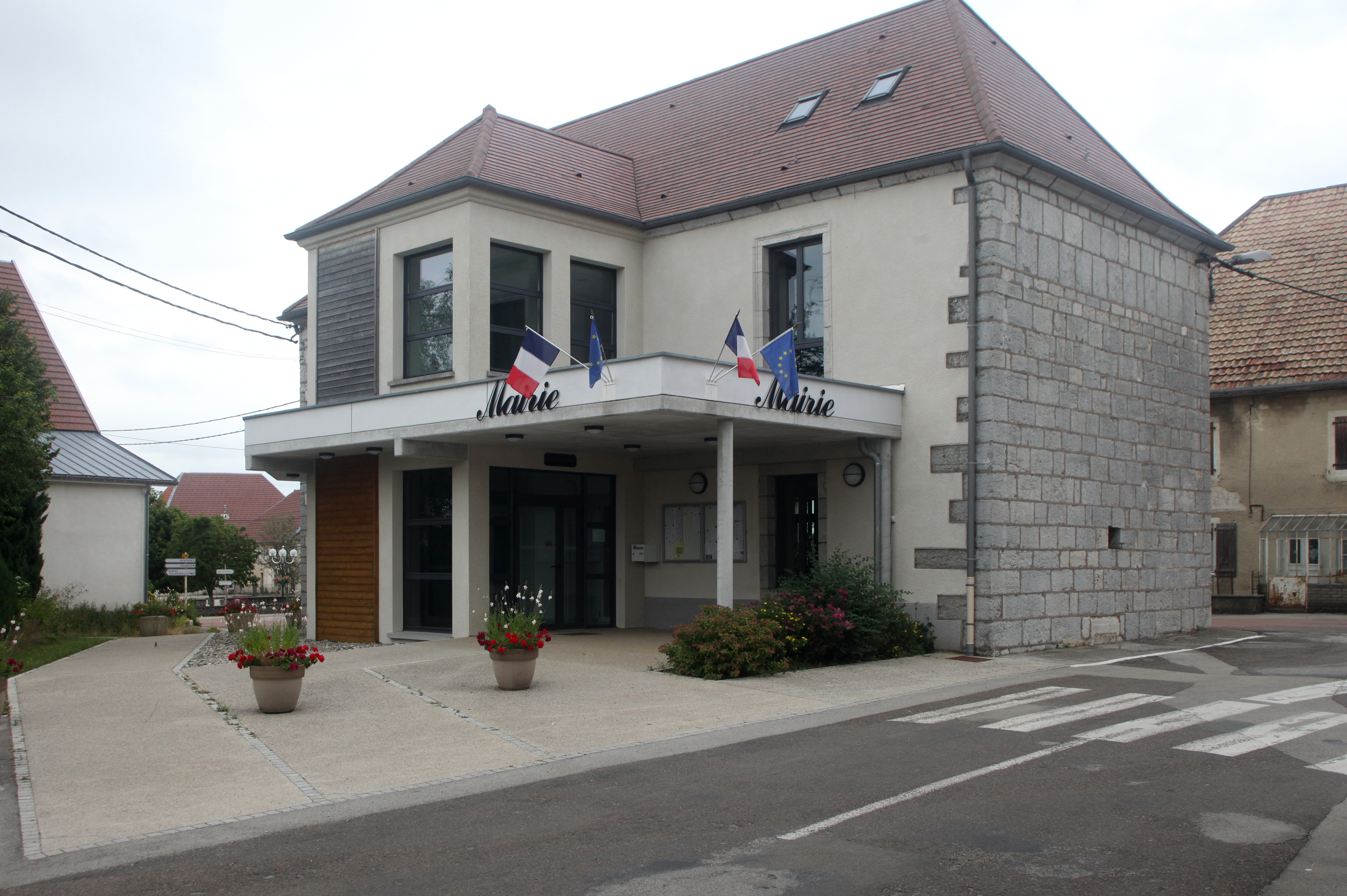
- The town hall in Épenoy

- Coat of arms
- Location of Épenoy
- Location within France Location within Bourgogne-Franche-Comté
- Coordinates: 47°07′55″N 6°22′17″E
- Country: France
- Region: Bourgogne-Franche-Comté
- Department: Doubs
- Arrondissement: Pontarlier
- Canton: Valdahon

Government
  - Mayor (2020–2026): Dominique Drezet
- Area^{1}: 13.25 km^{2} (5.12 sq mi)
- Elevation: 750 m (2,460 ft)
- Highest elevation: 822 m (2,697 ft)
- Lowest elevation: 679 m (2,228 ft)
- Population (2023): 649
  - Density: 49.0/km^{2} (127/sq mi)
- Time zone: UTC+01:00 (CET)
  - Summer (DST): UTC+02:00 (CEST)
- INSEE/Postal code: 25219 /25800
- ^{1} French Land Register data, which excludes lakes, ponds, glaciers > 1 km^{2} (0.386 sq mi or 247 acres) and river estuaries.

Épenoy (French pronunciation: [epnwa]) is a commune in the Doubs department in the Bourgogne-Franche-Comté region in eastern France.

== Population ==
Historical population
Year	Pop.	±% p.a.
1968	428	—
1975	414	−0.47%
1982	426	+0.41%
1990	407	−0.57%
1999	458	+1.32%
2007	544	+2.17%
2012	607	+2.22%
2017	630	+0.75%
2023	649	+0.50%
Source: INSEE

== See also ==
- Communes of the Doubs department
