= Jean Nicod =

French philosopher

Jean George Pierre Nicod (French: [niko]; 1 June 1893, Paris – 16 February 1924, Geneva) was a French philosopher and logician, best known for his work on propositional logic and induction.

== Biography ==
Nicod's main contribution to formal logic was to show that classical propositional calculus could be axiomatized with only one axiom (which is now known as Nicod's axiom) and one rule of inference, both formulated using the Sheffer stroke as only connective. In inductive logic and confirmation theory, he famously proposed Nicod's criterion, according to which a conditional hypothesis is confirmed by all and only its positive instances. This principle plays a central role in the derivation of Carl Hempel's raven paradox.

Nicod died at the age of 30 from tuberculosis.

== Legacy ==
The Institut Jean Nicod in Paris (a branch of the CNRS and a research laboratory at the interface between cognitive science and the social sciences) was named in honour of Nicod's memory. Jean Nicod's name is also commemorated by the prestigious Jean Nicod Lectures, which are delivered annually in Paris by a leading philosopher of mind or philosophically oriented cognitive scientist. The lecturer is awarded the Jean Nicod Prize by the CNRS, which sponsors the lectures to develop the field of cognitive science in France.

== Main works ==
- 1917, "A Reduction in the Number of Primitive Propositions of Logic", Proc. Camb. Phil. Soc. 19: 32–41.
- 1921, "La géométrie des sensations de mouvement", Revue de métaphysique et de morale 28: 537–43.
- 1922, "Les tendances philosophiques de M. Bertrand Russell", Revue de métaphysique et de morale 29: 77–84.
- 1922, "Mathematical Logic and the Foundations of Mathematics" in Encyclopædia Britannica: The New Volumes, vol. 3, 12th ed. 874–76.
- 1923. La géométrie dans le monde sensible. Thèse, Univ. de Paris.
- 1923. Le problème logique de l'induction. Thèse complémentaire, Univ. de Paris.
- 1924. "Les relations des valeurs et les relations de sens en logique formelle", Revue de métaphysique et de morale 31: 467–80.
- 1924, "Freedom of Association and Trade Unionism: An Introductory Survey", International Labor Review 9: 467–80.
- 1930. Foundations of Geometry & Induction, Containing Geometry in a Sensible World and the Logical Problem of Induction, with prefaces by Bertrand Russell and André Lalande. London: Kegan Paul, Trench, Trubner & Co. New York: Harcourt, Brace & Co. Reprinted 2000, London: Routledge. Translated by Philip P. Wiener.
