= Pascal Engel =

French philosopher

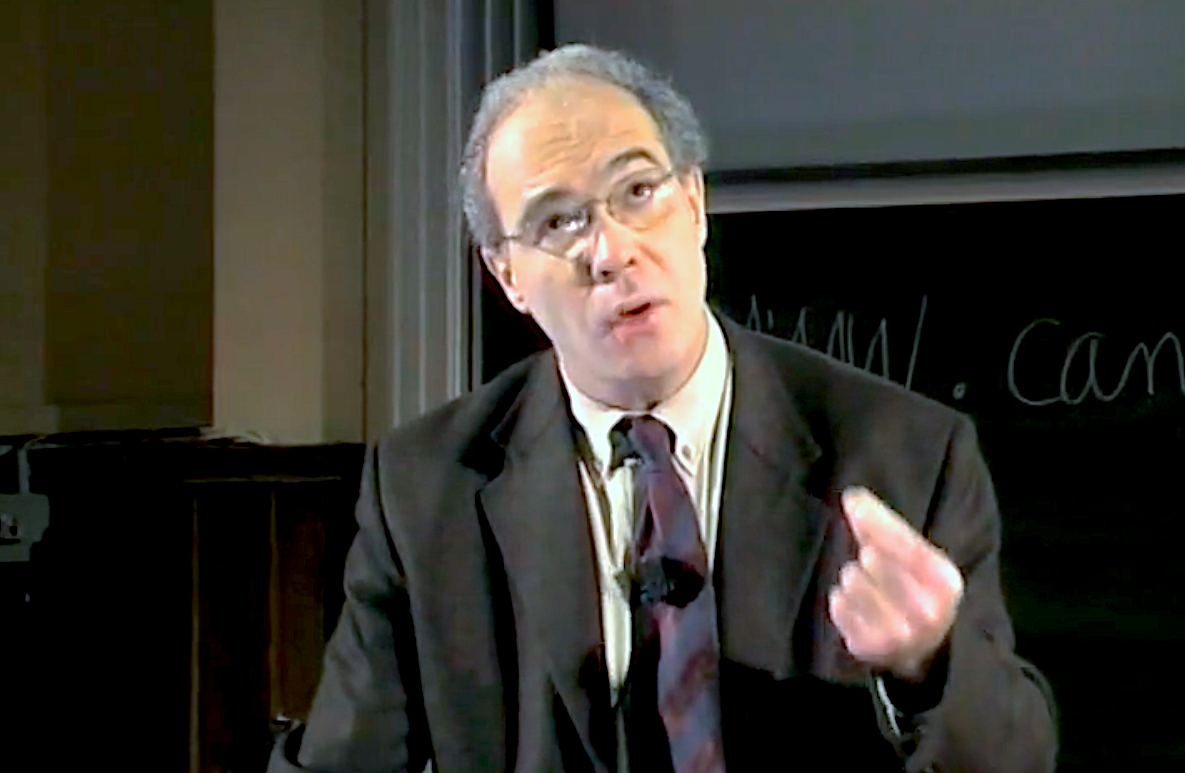
- Pascal Engel in 2000
- Born: 17 January 1954 (age 72); Aix-en-Provence, France

Education
- Education: École Normale Supérieure; Paris-Sorbonne University; Panthéon-Sorbonne University; University of Provence
- Doctoral advisor: Jacques Bouveresse; Gilles-Gaston Granger

Philosophical work
- Era: Contemporary philosophy
- Region: Western philosophy
- School: Analytic philosophy
- Institutions: Paris 12 Val de Marne University; University of Grenoble; University of Caen Normandy; Paris-Sorbonne University; University of Geneva; EHESS
- Main interests: Truth, epistemology, formal logic, philosophical logic, belief, knowledge, normativity, philosophy of language, philosophy of mind
- Notable ideas: Norm of truth

Pascal Engel (French: [ɑ̃ʒɛl]; born 1954) is a French philosopher, working on the philosophy of language, philosophy of mind, epistemology and philosophy of logic.

He was formerly professor of philosophy of logic at the University of Paris IV, professor of philosophy at the University of Geneva, and director of studies at the Ecole des hautes études en sciences sociales in Paris. He is a member of Institut Nicod.

== Books ==
- Va savoir - De la connaissance en général, Paris, Hermann, 2007
- A quoi bon la verité (with R. Rorty), Paris, Grasset, 2005 (Published in English as What's the Use of Truth?)
- Truth, Durham, Acumen, 2002
- Ramsey. Vérité et succès (with J. Dokic), Paris, PUF, 2001
- La verite, reflexions sur quelques truismes, Hatier, 1998
- La dispute, une introduction à la philosophie analytique, Paris, Minuit 1997
- Philosophie et psychologie, Paris, Gallimard, Folio, 1996
- Introduction à la philosophie de l'esprit, Paris, La Découverte, 1994
- Donald Davidson et la philosophie du langage, Paris, P.U.F., 1994
- La Norme du vrai, philosophie de la logique, Paris, Gallimard, 1989
- Identité et référence, la théorie des noms propres chez Frege et Kripke, Paris, Presses de l'École Normale Supérieure, 1985
