= María José Frápolli =

Spanish philosopher

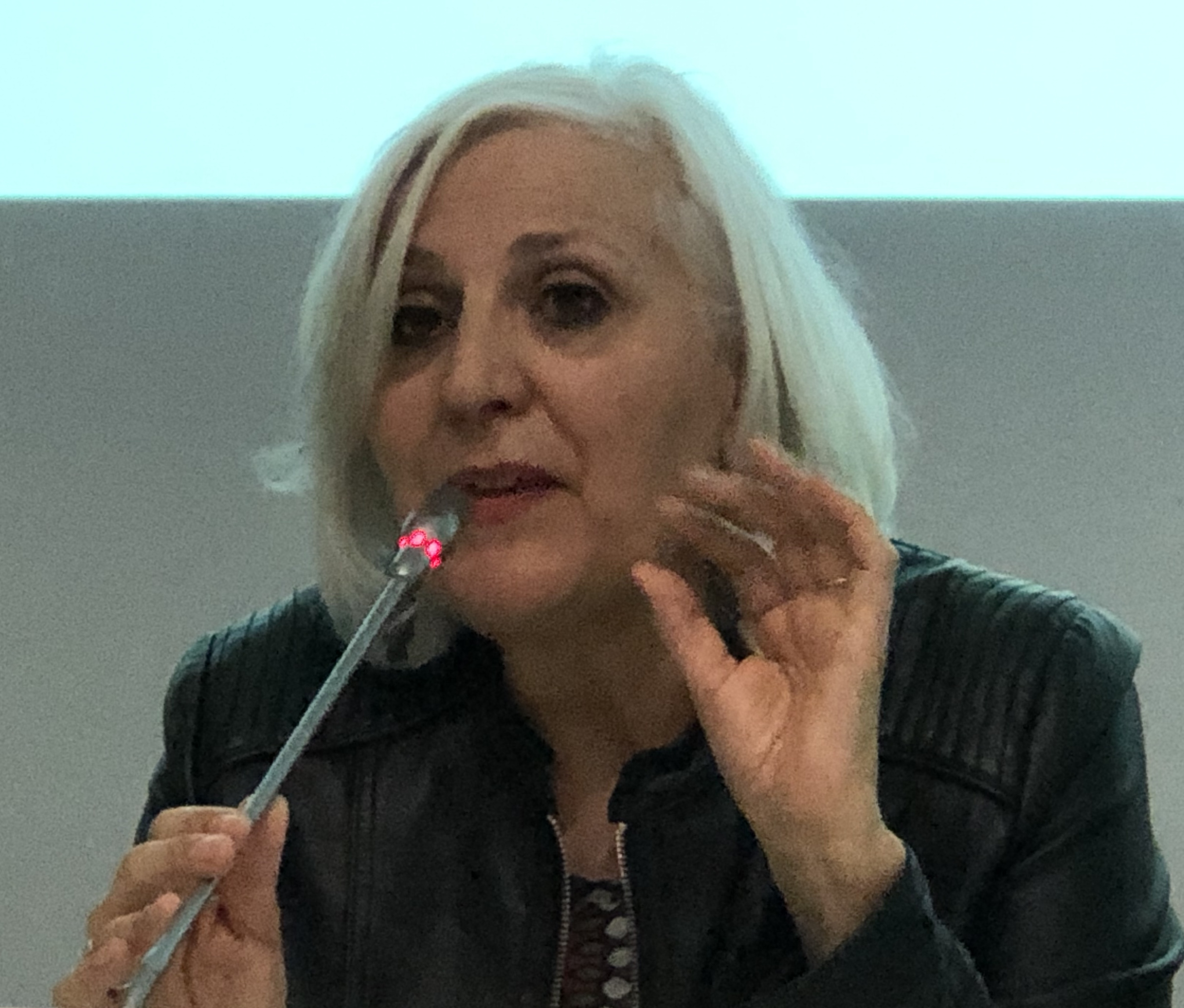
- Born: February 4, 1960 (age 66); Madrid
- Education: University of Granada
- Occupations: University professor and philosopher
- Employer: University of Granada

María José Frápolli Sanz (Madrid, February 4, 1960) is a Spanish philosopher. As of 2022, she is professor of Logic and Philosophy of Science at the University of Granada. Her work is focused on the philosophy of language and the philosophy of logic.

== Education and career ==
The second of five sisters, María José Frápolli was born in Madrid on February 4, 1960. Her undergraduate work was at the University of Granada where she specialized in philosophy. Frápolli went on to defend a doctorate at the University of Granada in 1987 with a thesis entitled La matematización del infinito. La emergencia de la teoría de conjuntos en la obra de G. Cantor. In 1992, she obtained a tenure-track faculty position, and she was promoted to professor in 2008.

From 1998 until 2001, she was the head of the philosophy department at the University of Granada. Between 2006 and 2012 she was president of the Spanish Society for Logic, Methodology and Philosophy of Science. From 2015 to 2017, she was Marie Sklodowska-Curie Fellow at the Department of Philosophy, University College London, and until 2020 Honorary Professor at the same department. She currently holds the presidency of the Society for Women in Philosophy (Analytic, Spain). She has had research stays at the universities of Coventry, Bristol, Miami, Helsinki and Oxford.

== Selected work ==
In 1998, Frápolli published the book Una aproximación a la filosofía del lenguaje together with her colleague Esther Romero; this book was reviewed by Theoria. In 2012, she published the book The Nature of Truth: An Updated Approach to the Meaning of Truth Ascriptions; this was reviewed by Teorema.

== Selected publications ==
M.J. Frápolli (forthcoming), The Priority of Propositions. A Pragmatist Philosophy of Science. Synthese Library

M.J. Frápolli (2019), Expressivisms, Knowledge and Truth. Royal Institute of Philosophy Supplements 86. Cambridge University Press

M.J. Frápolli (2007): Saying, Meaning, and Referring: Essays on François Recanati's Philosophy of Language, Houndmills, Basingstoke, Hampshire (UK), Palgrave Studies in Pragmatics, Language and Cognition

M.J. Frápolli (2005): F. P. Ramsey. Critical Reassessments. Londres (UK), Thoemmes Continuum

M.J. Frápolli and Esther Romero (2003): Meaning, Basic Self-Knowledge, and Mind. Essays on Tyler Burge, Stanford (USA), Center for the Study of Language and Information

Frápolli, M. J. (2022), “Truth in Pragmatism. Dewey and Brandom face to face”. Análisis. Revista de Investigación Filosófica Frapolli, M. J. (2022), “Tracking the World Down. How Inferentialism Accounts for Objective Truth”. Philosophical Topics 50 (1): 83-107

Frápolli Sanz, M. J. & Navarro Laespada, L. (2021), “I am large, I contain multitudes: Epistemic pragmatism, testimonial injustice and positive intersectionalism”. Daimon, 84, 115-129.

Frápolli Sanz, M . J. & Pérez Navarro, E. (2021), Introduction to Expressing Hatred: The Political Dimension of Expressives. Daimon, 84, 5-9. M. J. Frápolli y José Andrés Forero-Mora (2021), “Show me. Tractarian Non-Representationalism”. Teorema, vol. XL/2, pp. 00–00 M. J. Frápolli (2021), “Has Inferentialism left any scope for logical theory?” Academia Letters, article 457

Frapolli Sanz, M. J. (2019), “Ramsey in Belief and Truth”. En Stanford Encyclopedia of Philosophy. (MacBride, Fraser, Marion, Mathieu, Frápolli, María José, Edgington, Dorothy, Elliott, Edward, Lutz, Sebastian and Paris, Jeffrey, "Frank Ramsey", The Stanford Encyclopedia of Philosophy (Fall 2019 Edition), Edward N. Zalta (ed.), URL = <https://plato.stanford.edu/archives/fall2019/entries/ramsey/>.)

- Frápolli, María José (2013). The nature of truth: an updated approach to the meaning of truth ascriptions. Dordrecht: Springer. ISBN 978-94-007-4464-6. OCLC 806230398.
- Frápolli, María José. (1998). Una aproximación a la filosofía del lenguaje. Esther Romero. Madrid: Editorial Síntesis. ISBN 84-7738-568-8. OCLC 43521452.
- Teorías contemporáneas de la verdad. Juan Antonio Nicolás, María José Frápolli (2nd ed.). Madrid: Tecnos. 2012. ISBN 978-84-309-5276-2. OCLC 796309382.
  - Reviewed
