= Coralie Chevallier =

French behavioral scientist and university Vice President

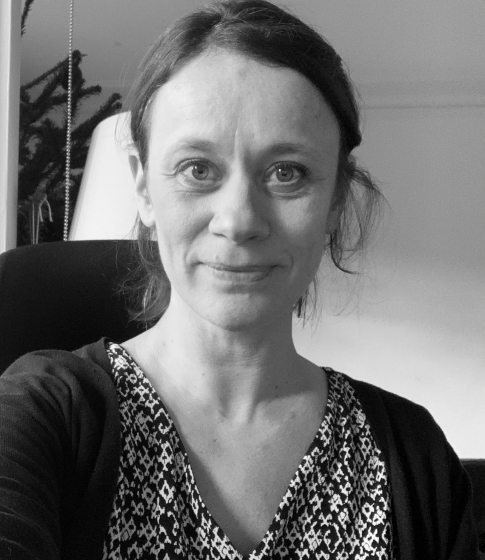
Coralie Chevallier in 2020.

Coralie Chevallier is a French behavioral scientist, psychologist and social scientist. She works on autism and her current work integrates psychology, economics and policy interventions. She is a professor of Behavioural Science at the Ecole Normale Supérieure and a senior researcher at Inserm, where she leads the team Evolution and Social Cognition.

Chevallier is also the vice-president for educational programs at the PSL University. In this role, Chevallier created an interdisciplinary undergraduate program called "science for a sustainable world". She is a member of the scientific council of Institut national du service public.

In 2022, Chevallier received the Ordre National du Mérite.

== Book ==
- Chevallier, C. & Perona, M. (2022) Homo Sapiens dans la cité : mettre la psychologie au service des politiques publiques, Odile Jacob, Paris.
