= Metarepresentation =

Representation of another representation

Metarepresentation (shaped from the Greek preposition and prefix meta meaning "beyond" and the word "representation") is the capacity of a mind to represent “a higher-order representation with a lower-order representation embedded within", as stated by Deirdre Wilson. In other words, it is the capacity to represent a representation. For example, a drawing is the representation of something and someone who looks at the drawing would represent it in his or her mind.

Metarepresentation also allows to understand other's thoughts. Put simply, a person has thoughts in response to a statement and may interpret it in many ways. This forms many metarepresentations of the statement.

Metarepresentation is also the ability to generate new knowledge or meaning through representing thoughts or concepts that are not noticed on a day-to-day basis. The ability to represent a representation of thoughts and concepts is the essence of reflection and higher-order thought. In this way, metarepresentation connects deeply with the theory of mind by giving the capacity to associate a statement to the diverging belief of another person. Someone without the capacities of the theory of mind would only have limited metarepresenting capacities. For example, some autistic people may have difficulty with metarepresentation stemming from possible challenges with the ability to link a person with a belief. Similarly, some children may lack the ability to link people with their beliefs. Without that, they can't have thoughts about the thoughts of someone else.

== See also ==
- Oratio obliqua (philosophy)
