= François Recanati =

French analytic philosopher and research fellow

- Born: 1952 (age 73–74); Paris, France

Education
- Education: Sorbonne, Oxford University

Philosophical work
- Era: Modern philosophy
- Region: Western philosophy
- School: Analytic philosophy
- Institutions: University of California, Berkeley, Harvard University, University of St Andrews
- Main interests: Philosophy of language, philosophy of mind, semantics, contextualism, concepts
- Notable ideas: Speech act theory, context-dependence in language and thought, analysis of singular concepts

François Recanati (born 1952) is a French analytic philosopher and research fellow at the College de France, and at the Centre National de la Recherche Scientifique. Many of his works focus on the philosophy of language and mind.

== Biography ==
He is the son of Jean Recanati and half-brother of militant Trotskyist Michel Recanati. After secondary studies at the Lycee Jacques-Decour and the Sorbonne, he received his degree in philosophy in 1974. He later studied at Oxford University and the School for Advanced Studies in the Social Sciences (EHESS), where he became lecturer in the areas of pragmatic linguistics and philosophy of language (1975–1990).

He has previously taught at the University of California, Berkeley; Harvard University; and the University of St Andrews. He has been a research fellow at the Centre National de la Recherche Scientifique (CNRS) in Paris since 1979.

In 1991, Recanati co-founded and was named the first president of the European Society for Analytic Philosophy. He retained this position until 1993. He is a directeur d’études at EHESS and the Director of Institut Jean-Nicod, a research lab in philosophy, linguistics and cognitive science under the aegis of the Ecole Normale Supérieure. His publications in the philosophy of language and mind include more than one hundred articles, many edited books, and a dozen monographs, notably Mental Files (Oxford University Press, 2012) and Mental Files in Flux (Oxford University Press, 2016).

== Philosophical positions ==
Recanati was drawn to the intellectual style of Jacques Lacan during the early 1970s and became part of the so-called Lacanian community, as Lacan seemed to Recanati an embodiment of a superior way and a new intellectual style. However, he later came to view Lacan's disciples as members of a “sect” who are obliged to accept every statement by Lacan as the truth, even if they do not understand the statement. Recanati also claimed that Lacan did not mean anything with his central concepts, since he was unable to introduce the meaning of a term along with the term itself. In their work, Recanati concluded, it is enough to use Lacanian jargon, even if one comes out with assertions that one does not understand oneself. Recanati therefore began distancing himself from Lacan and focusing on the philosophy of ordinary language. This was evident in his works where he drew from the radical contextualist view of predication and the attributive distinction for definite descriptions, citing their relevance in the revival of this philosophical tradition.

Recanati's research has since focused on three areas. The first is emphasized the speech act theory, which is said to provide ‘theoretical foundations for semantics”. The second involve “context-dependence in language and thought” while the third focused on “the theory of reference and the analysis of singular concepts, construed as mental files.”

In his review of Literal Meaning in Notre Dame Philosophical Reviews, Jason Stanley cited how Recanati maintained that what is intuitively said by an utterance is affected by context in ways that could not be explained by any combination of Chomsky, Montague, and Grice (that is, ordinary syntax and semantics, together with Gricean pragmatics) (1993, pp. 227–274). Since the publication of this work, Recanati has been developing this thesis in detail leading to the development of his concept, which he called contextualism. This notion holds that any proposition that we assert is affected by the so-called "primary pragmatic process". His arguments for the thesis he calls contextualism are brought together in characteristically clear and concise form in Literal Meaning. One of his positions was that there is only one pragmatic notion of context, challenging the distinctions offered by other thinkers of the so-called narrow and wide contexts.

Recanati also maintained that assumption is simulative in a technical and phenomenological sense. It is technical for its use of inference mechanism offline while it is phenomenological due to the way it often entails a kind of as if behavior. He described simulation as a psychological mechanism critical in understanding metarepresentation, particularly in the way this concept is viewed as ipso facto transparent. The process of metarepresentation begins with the simulation of the first-order content.

== Notable publications ==
- Meaning and Force: The Pragmatics of Performative Utterances, Cambridge University Press, 1988
- Direct Reference: From Language to Thought, Blackwell Publishers, 1993, 1997
- Oratio Obliqua, Oratio Recta: An Essay on Metarepresentation, MIT Press, 2000
- Literal Meaning, Cambridge University Press, 2003; ISBN 0521537363
- Perspectival Thought: A Plea for (Moderate) Relativism, Clarendon Press, 2007
- Truth-Conditional Pragmatics, Oxford University Press, Oxford, 2010
- Mental Files, Oxford University Press, Oxford, 2012; ISBN 978-0-19-965998-2
- Mental Files in Flux, Oxford University Press, Oxford, 2016; ISBN 978-0-19-879035-8

Recanati is also the general editor of the Jean Nicod Lectures book series at MIT press and the Context and Content series at Oxford University Press.

== Critical works ==
Recanati's work is analyzed or commented on in various published works, including Saying, Meaning and Referring: Essays on François Recanati's Philosophy of Language edited by María José Frápolli; Palgrave Macmillan (2007) ISBN 978-1403933287. Kent Bach, of San Francisco State University reviewed Truth-Conditional Pragmatics in Notre Dame Philosophical Reviews. Bach opened his review with the comment that "If you're unfamiliar with the title phrase of François Recanati's latest book, you'll naturally think he's proposing an alternative to truth-conditional semantics. And you'll be right. But not in the way you'd expect. And not in the way he intends." and summed up by saying "Thanks to Recanati's openness to diverse approaches, his fairness in critically examining competing views, his carefully nuanced argumentation, and his general thoroughness, to my mind the main rewards offered by the book Truth-Conditional Pragmatics can be derived by delving into its details. That's what I recommend doing."

For his part, Stanley commented that "the problem with Recanati's appeal to circumstances of evaluation to justify incomplete semantic contents is that it is in tension with much of current linguistic research."
