= Jules Vuillemin =

French philosopher

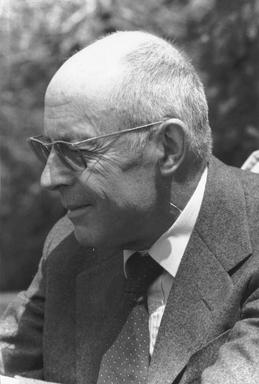
- Born: 15 February 1920; Pierrefontaine-les-Varans, Doubs, France
- Died: 16 January 2001 (aged 80); Les Fourgs, Doubs, France

Education
- Education: École Normale Supérieure
- Academic advisors: Gaston Bachelard; Jean Cavaillès; Martial Gueroult

Philosophical work
- Era: 20th-century philosophy
- Region: Western philosophy
- School: Analytic philosophy
- Institutions: University of Clermont-Ferrand; Collège de France
- Notable students: Jacques Bouveresse
- Main interests: Philosophical logic, philosophy of science, epistemology
- Notable ideas: Renewals of methods in mathematics as tending to influence philosophy

Jules Vuillemin (/ˌvuːiˈmæn/; French: [vɥijmɛ̃]; 15 February 1920 – 16 January 2001) was a French philosopher, professor of philosophy of knowledge at the Collège de France, in Paris, from 1962 to 1990, succeeding Maurice Merleau-Ponty, and professor emeritus from 1991 to 2001. He was an Invited Professor at the Institute for Advanced Study, in Princeton, New Jersey (1968).

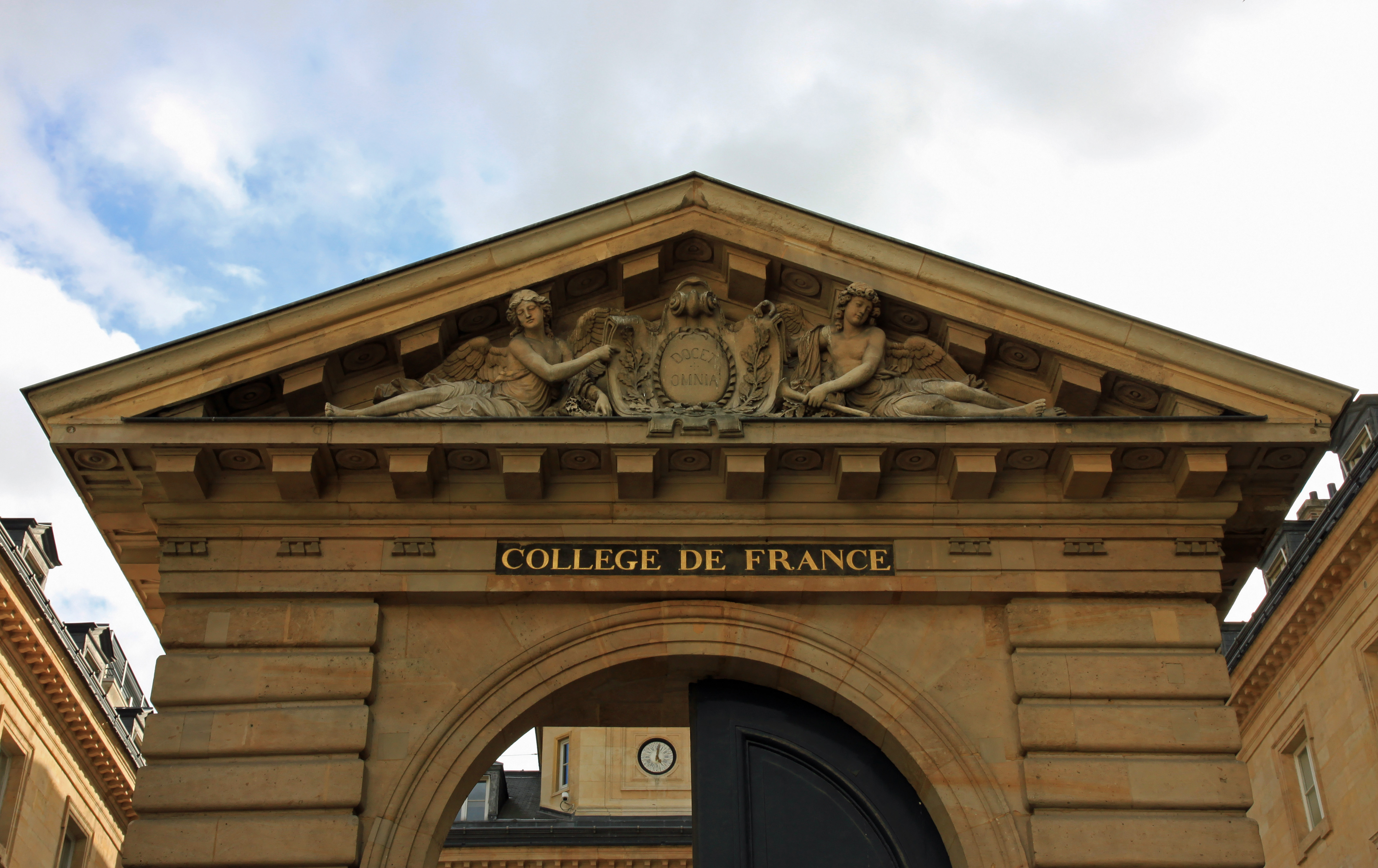
Collège de France (Paris, France).

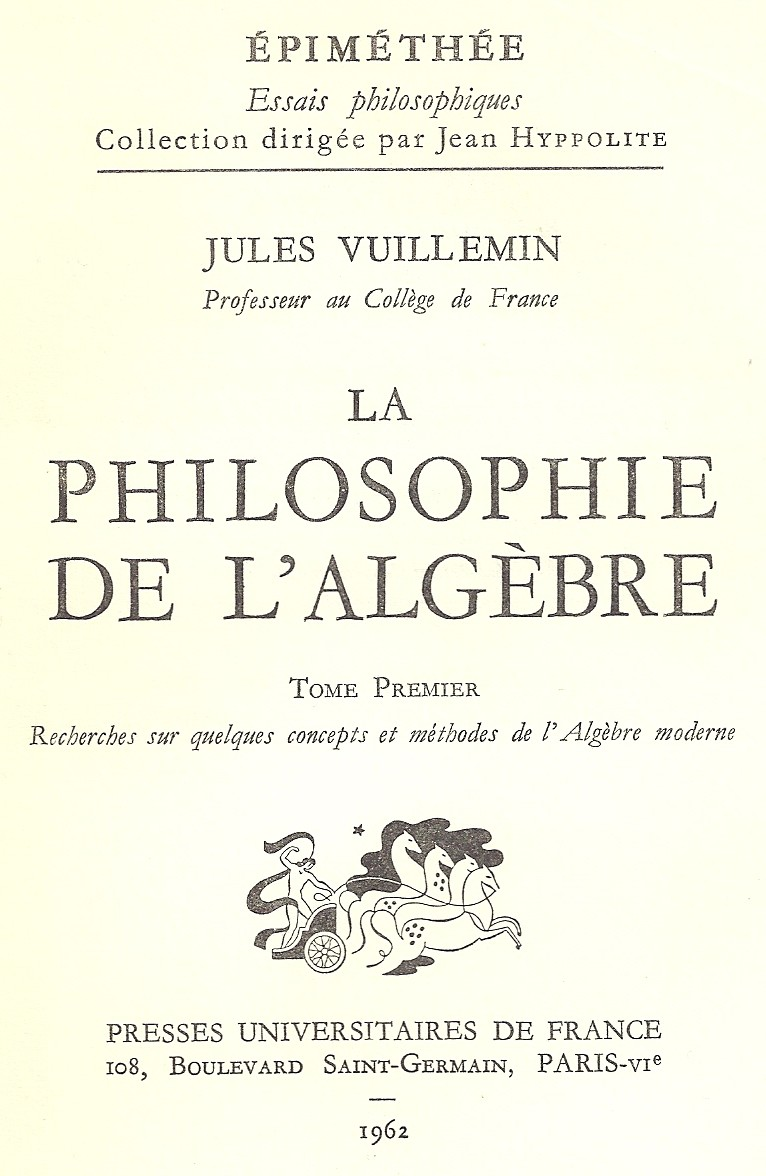
Jules Vuillemin, La philosophie de l'algèbre, Presses Universitaires de France, Paris, 1962.

At the Collège de France, Vuillemin introduced analytical philosophy to France. Vuillemin's thought had a major influence on Jacques Bouveresse's works. Vuillemin himself vindicated the legacy of Martial Gueroult.

A friend of Michel Foucault, he supported his election at the Collège de France, and was also close to Michel Serres.

== Biography ==
After studying at the École Normale Supérieure, he completed his agrégation in 1943, being received premier ex aequo alongside Tran Duc Thao. A student of French historical epistemologists Gaston Bachelard and Jean Cavaillès, he was however at first influenced by phenomenology and existentialism, before shifting towards study of logics and science.

He had two children from his first marriage to Suzanne Vuillemin (née Pagnier): Françoise Létoublon and Jean Vuillemin.

In 1962, he published a book titled The Philosophy of Algebra, dedicated to mathematician Pierre Samuel (a member of the Bourbaki group), René Thom, physicist Raymond Siestrunck, and linguist Georges Vallet. Vuillemin thought that renewals of methods in mathematics have influenced philosophy, thus relating the discovery of irrational numbers to Platonism, algebraic geometry to Cartesianism, infinitesimal calculus to Gottfried Wilhelm Leibniz. Furthermore, he observed that philosophy had not yet taken into account the changes brought to mathematics by Joseph Louis Lagrange and Évariste Galois.

In 1968, he co-founded with Gilles-Gaston Granger the journal L'Âge de la Science. He was one of the main French commentators on the philosophy and works of Bertrand Russell, Ludwig Wittgenstein, Rudolf Carnap and Willard Van Orman Quine.

Vuillemin also took an interest in aesthetics, besides writing several books on Kant, Anselm and on Diodorus's master argument (see problem of future contingents).

== Jules Vuillemin's Archives ==
The Jules Vuillemin's Archives are located in France at the Laboratoire d'Histoire des Sciences et de Philosophie - Archives Henri Poincaré.

Gilles-Gaston Granger was, until his death in 2016, the president of the scientific committee of Jules Vuillemin's Archives.

== Bibliography ==
- Le Sens du destin, en collaboration avec Louis Guillermit, Neuchâtel, Éditions de La Baconnière, 1948.
- Essai sur la signification de la mort, Paris, PUF, 1948.
- L'Être et le travail. Les conditions dialectiques de la psychologie et de la sociologie, Paris, PUF, 1949.
- L'héritage kantien et la révolution copernicienne. Fichte — Cohen — Heidegger, Paris, PUF, 1954.
- Physique et métaphysique kantiennes, Paris, PUF, 1955, rééd. PUF, coll. Dito, 1987.
- Mathématiques et métaphysique chez Descartes, Paris, PUF, 1960, rééd. PUF, 1987.
- La Philosophie de l'algèbre, Vol. I : Recherches sur quelques concepts et méthodes de l'Algèbre Moderne. Paris, PUF, 1962, rééd. 1993.
- De la Logique à la théologie. Cinq études sur Aristote, Paris, Flammarion, 1967, nouvelle version remaniée et augmentée par l'auteur / editée et prefacée par T. Benatouil. - Louvain-La-Neuve, Peeters, 2008.
- Leçons sur la première philosophie de Russell, Paris, Armand Colin, 1968, in reference to The Principles of Mathematics.
- Rebâtir l'Université, Paris, Fayard, 1968.
- La logique et le monde sensible. Étude sur les théories contemporaines de l'abstraction, Paris, Flammarion, 1971.
- Le Dieu d'Anselme et les apparences de la raison, Paris, Aubier, 1971.
- Nécessité ou contingence. L'aporie de Diodore et les systèmes philosophiques, Paris, Minuit, 1984, réed. 1997.
- Éléments de poétique, Paris, Vrin, 1991.
- Trois Histoires de guerre, Besançon, Cêtre, 1992.
- Dettes, Besançon, Cêtre, 1992.
- L'intuitionnisme kantien, Paris, Vrin, 1994.
- Le Miroir de Venise, Paris, Julliard, 1995.
- « Nouvelles réflexions sur l'argument dominateur : une double référence au temps dans la seconde prémisse ». In : Philosophie 55 (1997), p. 14–30.
- Mathématiques pythagoriciennes et platoniciennes. Recueil d'études, Paris, Albert Blanchard, coll. Sciences dans l'histoire, 2001.

English translations

- Necessity or Contingency. The Master Argument, Stanford, CSLI Publications, 1996
- What are Philosophical Systems? Cambridge University Press, 1986
