= Gilles-Gaston Granger =

French philosopher

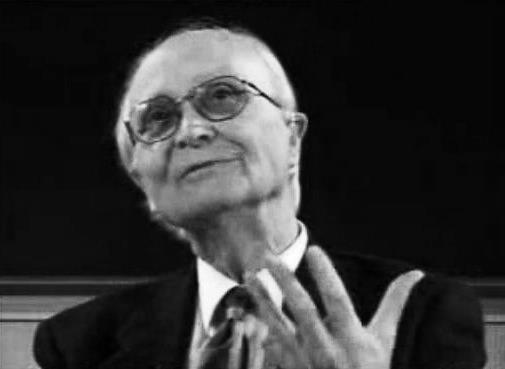
- Gilles Gaston Granger at the Conservatoire national des arts et métiers in 2000
- Born: 28 January 1920; Paris, France
- Died: 24 August 2016 (aged 96); Saint-Cloud, France

Education
- Education: École Normale Supérieure; University of Paris
- Doctoral advisor: Gaston Bachelard
- Other advisors: Jean Cavaillès; Martial Gueroult

Philosophical work
- Era: Contemporary philosophy
- Region: Western philosophy
- School: Analytic philosophy
- Institutions: University of São Paulo; CNRS; University of Rennes; University of Provence; Collège de France; Conservatoire national des arts et métiers
- Doctoral students: Pascal Engel
- Main interests: Philosophical logic, philosophy of science, epistemology
- Notable ideas: Philosophy of style

Gilles-Gaston Granger (/ɡrɑːnˈʒeɪ/; French: [ɡʁɑ̃ʒe]; 28 January 1920 – 24 August 2016) was a French philosopher.

== Work ==
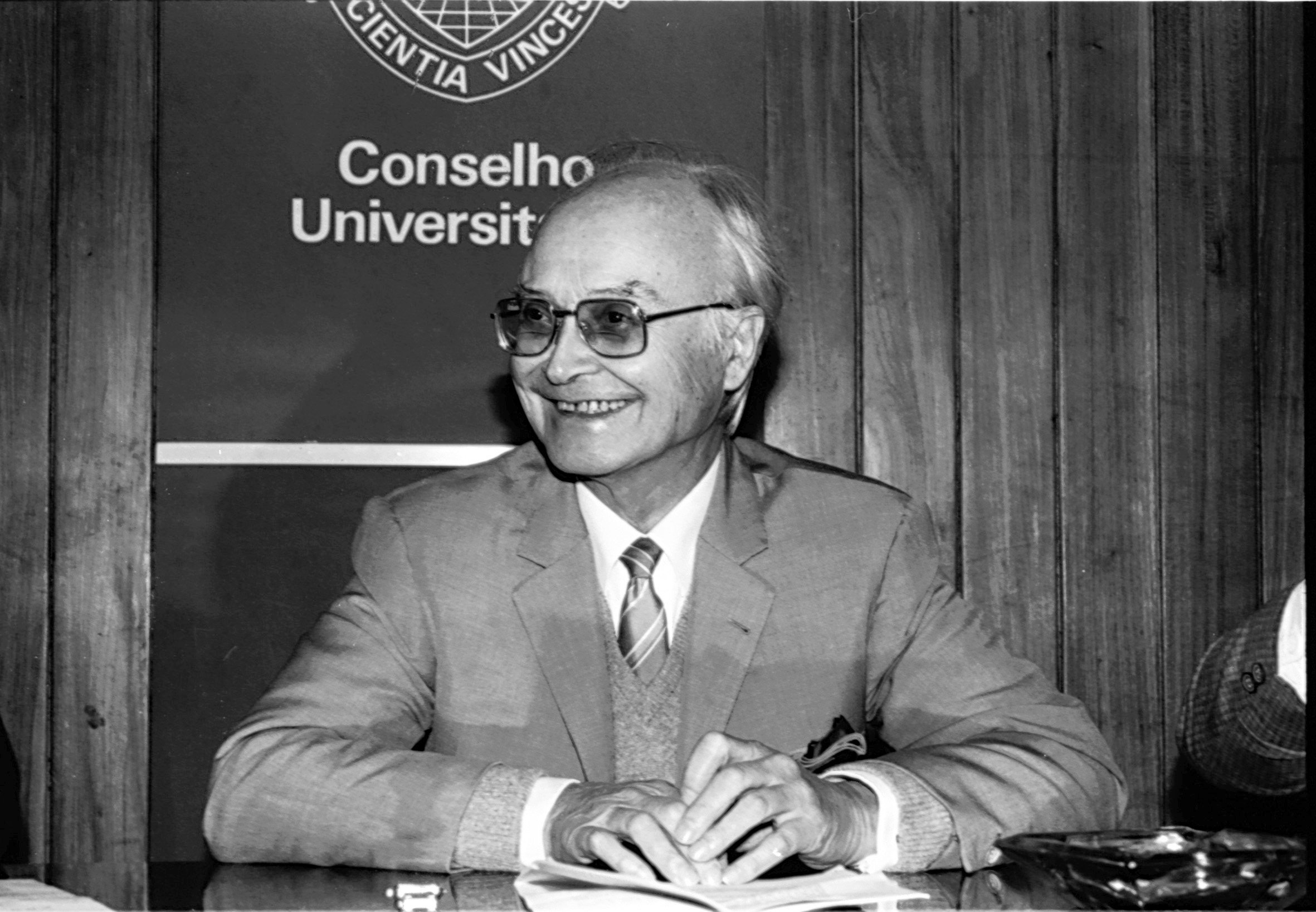
Granger at University of São Paulo, 1990

His works discuss the philosophy of logic, mathematics, human and social sciences, Aristotle, Jean Cavaillès, and Ludwig Wittgenstein.

He produced the most authoritative French translation of Wittgenstein's Tractatus Logico-Philosophicus and published more than 150 scientific articles.

In 1968 he co-founded with Jules Vuillemin the journal L'Âge de la Science. He was president of the scientific committee of Jules Vuillemin's Archives.

== Biography ==
- Studied at École Normale Supérieure, Paris, France. Associate in philosophy, bachelor in mathematics, doctorate in philosophy.
- 1947–1953: Professor at the University of São Paulo, Brazil.
- 1953–1955: Associate professor at the Centre National de la Recherche Scientifique (CNRS).
- 1955–1962: Professor at the University of Rennes.
- 1962–1964: Director of the École Normale Supérieure d'Afrique Centrale, in Brazzaville, Republic of the Congo.
- 1964–1986: Professor at the Université de Provence, Aix-en-Provence, France.
- 1986: Professor at the Collège de France. Chair of Comparative Epistemology.
- 1990: Professor emeritus of the Collège de France.
- 2000: Invited professor at the Conservatoire National des Arts et Métiers.

== Works ==
- Méthodologie économique (PUF, 1955)
- La raison (1955)
- La mathématique sociale du marquis de Condorcet (PUF, 1956)
- Pensée formelle et sciences de l'homme (Aubier, 1960)
  - Formal Thought and the Sciences of Man, translation by Alexander Rosenberg (Boston Studies in the Philosophy of Science, 1983)
- Essai d'une philosophie du style (Armand Colin, 1968)
- Wittgenstein (Seghers, 1969)
- La théorie aristotélicienne de la science (Aubier, 1976)
- Langage et épistémologie (Klincksieck, 1979)
- Pour la connaissance philosophique (Odile Jacob, 1988)
- Invitation à la lecture de Wittgenstein (Alinéa, 1990)
- La vérification (Odile Jacob, 1992)
- Le probable, le possible et le virtuel (Odile Jacob, 1995)
- L'irrationnel (Odile Jacob, 1998)
- La pensée de l'espace (Odile Jacob, 1999)
