= Philosophy of love (disambiguation) =

Philosophy of love is a field of philosophy.

Philosophy of love may also refer to:

- Philosophy of Love, a book by Irving Singer
- Philosophy of Love, a book by Franciscus Patricius
