= Sex and Ethics =

2007 book

Sex and Ethics: Essays on Sexuality, Virtue and the Good Life
- Author: Raja Halwani (editor)
- Language: English
- Subject: philosophy of sex
- Publisher: Palgrave Macmillan
- Publication date: 2007
- Media type: Print, ebook
- ISBN: 9781403989840

Sex and Ethics: Essays on Sexuality, Virtue and the Good Life is a book edited by Raja Halwani in which the authors provide philosophical analyses of different aspects of human sexuality.

== Reception ==
The book was reviewed by Andreas G. Philaretou, John A. Dick and Cheshire Calhoun.

== Essays ==
- Juha Sihvola, ‘‘Sexual Desire and Virtue in Ancient Philosophy’’
- Lara Denis, ‘‘Sex and the Virtuous Kantian Agent’’
- Martha Nussbaum, ‘‘Feminism, Virtue, and Objectification’’
- Jonathan Jacob, ‘‘Sexuality and the Unity of the Virtues’’
- David Carr, ‘‘On the Prospects of Chastity as a Contemporary Virtue’’
- Peter Geach, ‘‘Temperance’’
- Nicholas Dent, ‘‘Deliberation and Sense–Desire: The Virtue of Temperance’’
- Raja Halwani, ‘‘Sexual Temperance and Intemperance’’
- Neera Badhwar, ‘‘Carnal Wisdom and Sexual Virtue’’
- Heather Battaly, ‘‘Intellectual Virtue and Knowing One’s Sexual Orientation’’
- James Stramel, ‘‘Coming Out, Outing, and Virtue Ethics’’
- Jan Steutel and Ben Spiecker, ‘‘Components of Virtues and Stagnations in Moral-Sexual Development’’
- Dirk Baltzly, ‘‘The Wrongness of Adultery: A Neo-Aristotelian Approach’’
- Stephen Kershnar, ‘‘Pornography, Health, and Virtue’’
- Raja Halwani, ‘‘Casual Sex, Promiscuity, and Temperance’’
- Alan Soble, Afterword
