= Philosophy of Love, Sex, and Marriage =

2010 book by Raja Halwani

Philosophy of Love, Sex, and Marriage: An Introduction
- Author: Raja Halwani
- Language: English
- Subject: Philosophy of sex, philosophy of love
- Publisher: Routledge
- Publication date: 2010 (1st ed.), 2018 (2nd ed.)
- Media type: Print, ebook
- Pages: 438
- ISBN: 9781315272399

Philosophy of Love, Sex, and Marriage: An Introduction is a 2010 book by Raja Halwani, in which the author provides an introduction to philosophical aspects of sex, love, and marriage based on virtue ethics.

== Reception ==
The book was reviewed by John Corvino, Jane O’Grady, Stan van Hooft, Ronald de Sousa, Christian Perring, John R. Williams, and Shaun D. Miller.
