= Philosophy of Love =

2009 book by Irving Singer

Philosophy of Love: A Partial Summing-Up
- Cover of the first edition
- Author: Irving Singer
- Language: English
- Series: The Irving Singer Library
- Subjects: Philosophy of love Philosophy of sex
- Publisher: MIT Press
- Publication date: 2009
- Publication place: United States
- Media type: Print (Hardcover and Paperback)
- Pages: 125
- ISBN: 978-0262516174

Philosophy of Love: A Partial Summing-Up is a 2009 book by American philosopher Irving Singer that summarizes and expands on the themes of his earlier three-volume works, The Nature of Love (1984–1987) and Meaning in Life (1992–1996). The book, which its author has described as an "intellectual biography", received positive reviews.

== Summary ==
Singer summarizes his ideas about the philosophy of love.

== Publication history ==
Philosophy of Love: A Partial Summing-Up was first published by MIT Press in 2009, with a foreword written by Alan Soble.

== Reception ==
Philosophy of Love: A Partial Summing-Up received positive reviews from the philosopher Leslie Armour in Library Journal, Erica Lucast Stonestreet in Notre Dame Philosophical Reviews, Michael Strawser in Dialogue: Canadian Philosophical Review, and from Publishers Weekly. The book was also reviewed by R. White in Choice: Current Reviews for Academic Libraries.

Armour described the book as "an account of a life devoted to the idea of love and the love of ideas", and wrote that it summarizes Singer's previous work, including his philosophical trilogies The Nature of Love and Meaning in Life, "with relaxed charm." Stonestreet observed that the book deals with the same themes as Singer's previous works, such as The Nature of Love. She wrote that it resembled a conversation in structure, and that it "lacks an overarching thesis and may for this reason be disappointing to someone who is looking for a systematic introduction to the philosophy of love", but credited Singer with being able to talk "graciously and thoughtfully about things that matter." She compared Singer's views to those of the philosopher Harry Frankfurt, in that "both believe that love involves bestowing value on the beloved". Strawser described the book as "the kind of book one wants to read by an eminent philosopher who has devoted his philosophical career to the study of love" and "an ideal opening text for a course on the philosophy of love". He credited Singer with providing an "accessible historical overview of the subject". Publishers Weekly described the book as "fairly interesting" and a summation of Singer's work, suggesting that it could serve as an introduction to it. It also wrote that it can serve as "a stand-alone survey of", or a model for understanding, the philosophy of love.

The philosopher Alan Soble wrote that Philosophy of Love: A Partial Summing-Up "is as much an intellectual biography as it is an exploration of love and sex", and observed that it "summarizes, explains, and elaborates" themes in Singer's The Nature of Love. He recommended it to "potential students of the philosophy of love and sex".

== Bibliography ==
Books

- Singer, Irving (2009). Philosophy of Love: A Partial Summing-Up. Cambridge, Massachusetts: MIT Press. ISBN 978-0262516174.
- Soble, Alan (2009). "Foreword". Philosophy of Love: A Partial Summing-Up. Cambridge, Massachusetts: MIT Press. ISBN 978-0262516174.

Journals

- Armour, Leslie (2009). "The Philosophy of Love: A Partial Summing-Up". Library Journal. 134 (6). – via EBSCO's Academic Search Complete (subscription required)
- Strawser, Michael (2010). "[Philosophy of Love]". Dialogue: Canadian Philosophical Review. 49 (3). – via EBSCO's Academic Search Complete (subscription required)
- White, R. (2009). "Philosophy of love: a partial summing-up". Choice: Current Reviews for Academic Libraries. 47 (2). – via EBSCO's Academic Search Complete (subscription required)
- "Philosophy of Love: A Partial Summing Up". Publishers Weekly. 256 (1). 2009. – via EBSCO's Academic Search Complete (subscription required)

Online articles

- Stonestreet, Erica Lucast (June 28, 2009). "Philosophy of Love: A Partial Summing-Up". Notre Dame Philosophical Reviews: An Electronic Journal.
