= The Philosophy of Sex: Contemporary Readings =

Book

- Title page for The Philosophy of Sex: Contemporary Readings (1980)
- Author: Raja Halwani, Alan Soble, Jacob M. Held, Sarah Hoffman (editors)
- Language: English
- Subject: philosophy of sex
- Publisher: Rowman & Littlefield
- Publication date: 1980 (1st ed), 1991 (2nd ed), 1997 (3rd ed), 2017 (7th ed)
- Media type: Print, ebook
- Pages: 552
- ISBN: 9781442261440

The Philosophy of Sex: Contemporary Readings is a book edited by Raja Halwani, Alan Soble, Jacob M. Held, and Sarah Hoffman in which the authors provide philosophical analyses of different aspects of human sexuality.

== Reception ==
The book was reviewed by Randy Cagle, Jesse Kalin and David Archard. It also received short reviews by Marianne Janack (John Stewart Kennedy Professor of Philosophy, Hamilton College), Ronald de Sousa (Professor Emeritus of Philosophy, University of Toronto), Arina Pismenny (Montclair State University), James P. Sterba (University of Notre Dame), Thom Brooks (Durham University), and Timothy F. Murphy (University of Illinois College of Medicine).
