= Ruwen Ogien =

French philosopher

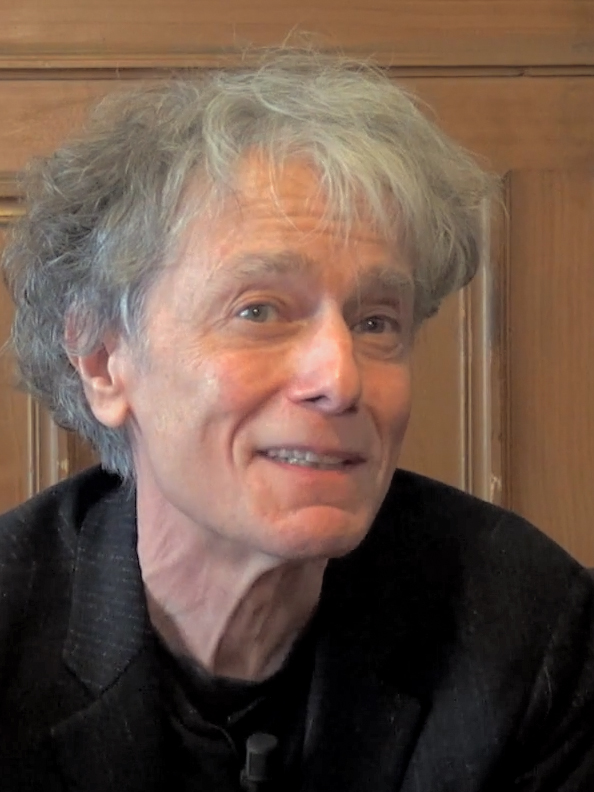
Ruwen Ogien (2014)

Ruwen Ogien (24 December 1947 – 4 May 2017) was a contemporary French philosopher. He was a researcher (directeur de recherche) at the French National Centre for Scientific Research. He focused on moral philosophy and the philosophy of social science. He was the brother of Albert Ogien a sociologist.

== Biography ==
Ogien was educated in Brussels, Tel Aviv, University of Cambridge, Paris, Columbia University and Montreal.

== Work ==
Trained in social anthropology, he wrote extensively on poverty and immigration. His thesis in philosophy, under the direction of Jacques Bouveresse, was published under the title The Weakness of the Will. His last areas of research are moral philosophy and the philosophy of social sciences. He was also interested in the philosophy of action, the notion of practical reason as well as practical irrationality. His other work was focused on the question of emotions, including hatred and shame.

He was working to develop an ethical theory he called "minimal ethics." This is an ethical anti-paternalistic theory which would give reason to minimize the areas of intervention of what he calls, following John Stuart Mill, the "moral police". Minimal ethics arose initially in the form of three principles:

- Principle of equal consideration asks us to give the same value to everyone's voice;
- Principle of neutrality towards conceptions of right and personal property
- Principle of limited intervention in cases of egregious wrongs done.

Subsequently, Ogien tried to reduce it to one: "Do not harm others, nothing more" following this reasoning:

- We have no moral duty towards ourselves. We only have moral duties towards others.
- Moral duties towards others can be either positive (help doing good) or negative (do no harm).
- The positive option can be expressed through charitable support, which may lead to paternalism - an attitude of wanting to do good for others regardless of their opinion.
- To avoid paternalism, it is better to stick to one principle negative not to harm others.

Finally, what Ogien called "minimal ethics" is an ethic that excludes moral duties to oneself and positive paternalistic duties towards others. It tends to be reduced to one principle of not harming others. In accordance with this general conception of ethics, it supports the freedom to do what one wants from his own life as long as we do not harm others, which implies that the decriminalization of drug use, all forms of sexual relations between consenting adults, and active assistance to die for those who make the request. A special issue of the Journal of Theology and Philosophy was devoted to minimal ethics.

Ogien tried to relate ethics with similarly 'minimal' work on the moral development of children and the variability of moral systems in a book published in September 2011: The influence of the smell of croissants on human kindness and other matters of experimental moral philosophy.

== Publications ==
- Réseaux d'immigrés : ethnographie de nulle part, (avec Jacques Katuszewski), Éditions ouvrières, 1981.
- Théories ordinaires de la pauvreté, PUF, 1983.
- Un portrait logique et moral de la haine, L'éclat, 1993.
- La faiblesse de la volonté, PUF, 1993.
- Traduction de l'ouvrage de Thomas Nagel Qu'est-ce que tout cela veut dire? : une très brève introduction à la philosophie, L'éclat, 1993
- La couleur des pensées : sentiments, émotions, intentions (avec Patricia Paperman), EHESS, (coll. Raisons pratiques), 1995.
- Les causes et les raisons : philosophie analytique et sciences humaines, Jacqueline Chambon, 1995.
- Co-traduction de l'ouvrage de G.E. Moore, "Principia Ethica", Paris, PUF, 1998.
- Le réalisme moral, Paris, P.U.F, 1999.
- L’enquête ontologique. Du mode d’existence des objets sociaux, (avec Pierre Livet), EHESS, (Coll. Raisons pratiques), 2000.
- Raison pratique et sociologie de l’éthique, Paris, CNRS éds, (avec Simone Bateman-Novaes et Patrick Pharo), 2000.
- La honte est-elle immorale ?, Bayard, 2002.
- Le rasoir de Kant et autres essais de philosophie pratique, L’éclat 2003.
- Penser la pornographie, PUF, Coll. Questions d’éthique, 2003, deuxième édition mise à jour 2008
- La philosophie morale (avec Monique Canto-Sperber), PUF, 2004, troisième édition mise à jour 2010
- La panique morale, Grasset, 2004.
- Pourquoi tant de honte ? Nantes, Pleins Feux, 2005.
- La sexualité, (avec Jean-Cassien Billier), Comprendre, PUF, 2005.
- La morale a-t-elle un avenir ?, Pleins Feux, 2006.
- L'éthique aujourd'hui. Maximalistes et minimalistes, Paris, Gallimard, 2007.
- La liberté d'offenser. Le sexe, l'art et la morale, Paris, La Musardine, 2007.
- Les Concepts de l'éthique. Faut-il être conséquentialiste?, Paris, collection L'Avocat du Diable, Éditions Hermann, 2009 (avec Christine Tappolet).
- La vie, la mort, l'État. Le débat bioéthique, Paris, Grasset, 2009.
- Le corps et l'argent, Paris, La Musardine, 2010.
- L’influence de l’odeur des croissants chauds sur la bonté humaine et autres questions de philosophie morale expérimentale, Paris, Grasset, 2011.
- L'État nous rend-il meilleurs ?, Paris, Gallimard, 2013.
- Mon dîner chez les cannibales, Paris, Grasset, 2016
- Mes Mille et Une Nuits. La maladie comme drame et comme comédie, Albin Michel, 2017.
