= Raja Halwani =

American-Lebanese philosopher (born 1967)

- Born: 1967 (age 58–59); Beirut, Lebanon

Education
- Education: Syracuse University (PhD), American University of Beirut (BA)
- Thesis: Intention, interpretation, and truth (1996)
- Doctoral advisor: Catherine Lord

Philosophical work
- Era: 21st-century philosophy
- Region: Western philosophy
- Institutions: School of the Art Institute of Chicago
- Main interests: Moral philosophy; political philosophy; philosophy of sex
- Website: http://rajahalwani.blogspot.com/

Raja Fouad Halwani (born 1967) is an American-Lebanese philosopher and professor of philosophy at the School of the Art Institute of Chicago. He is known for his works on philosophy of sex.

== Philosophy ==
Being gay, he started with some ethical questions related to homosexuality and some sexual acts (rightly or wrongly) related to gay men: unrestrained, casual sex and open relationships. In fact, his first two publications, in the days when he was a graduate student, were: “Are One Night Stands Morally Problematic?” and “The Morality of Adultery.” Convinced by the work of Alan Soble that thinking about sex is one of the most important philosophical endeavors, he denies his guilt about publishing about sex and even brazenly uses the language of virtue to do so. Halwani, an American-Arab (originally Lebanese), is also very interested in sexual issues and the contemporary Middle East, often addressing them through a debate between essentialism and social constructivism. In addition, he publishes in the field of philosophy of art and political philosophy and is generally an ardent supporter of pop culture, simultaneously (or intermittently?) liking it and despising it.

== Books ==
- Virtuous Liaisons: Care, Love, Sex and Virtue Ethics, Open Court 2003
- The Israeli-Palestinian Conflict: Philosophical Essays on Self-Determination, Terrorism and the One-State Solution, with Tomis Kapitan, Springer 2007
- Sex and Ethics: Essays on Sexuality, Virtue and the Good Life (ed.), Palgrave Macmillan 2007
- Philosophy of Love, Sex, and Marriage: An Introduction, Routledge 2010, 2nd edition 2018
- Queer Philosophy: Presentations of the Society for Lesbian and Gay Philosophy, 1998–2008, co-editor with Carol V. A. Quinn and Andy Wible, Rodopi 2012
- The Philosophy of Sex: Contemporary Readings, co-editor with Alan Soble, Sarah Hoffman and Jacob M. Held, Rowman & Littlefield Publishers 2012
