= Canadian Philosophical Association =

Canadian learned society

- Association canadienne de philosophie
- Abbreviation: CPA
- Formation: 1958; 68 years ago
- Headquarters: Toronto, Ontario, Canada
- Region served: Canada
- Official language: English; French
- Website: acpcpa.ca

The Canadian Philosophical Association (CPA; French: Association canadienne de philosophie [ACP]) was founded in 1958 as a bilingual non-profit organization to promote philosophical scholarship and education across Canada, and to represent the interests of the profession in public forums. It publishes a quarterly journal, Dialogue: Canadian Philosophical Review. All activities and publications are bilingual. As of 2021, the association numbers over 600 active members.

Past presidents of the society include Luc Langlois, David Braybrooke, Kai Nielsen, William Sweet, Ronald de Sousa, Adèle Mercier, Thomas De Koninck, Sandra Lapointe, Samantha Brennan, Daniel Weinstock, Dominic McIver Lopes and Christine Tappolet. The current president is Jennifer Nagel of the University of Toronto.

The administrative offices are located in Toronto.

== Presidents ==
- 1958–1961 – Jean Langlois
- 1962 – A. H. Johnson
- 1963–1966 – A. R. C. Duncan
- 1967 – L. Martinelli
- 1968 – T. Penelhum
- 1969 – J. Wojciechowski
- 1970 – E. Trépannier
- 1971 – David Braybrooke
- 1972 – Gilles Cazabon
- 1973 – John Yolton
- 1974 – J. Plamondon
- 1975 – Francis Sparshott
- 1976 – N. Lacharité
- 1977 – John King-Farlow
- 1978 – Venant Cauchy
- 1979 – A. McKinnon
- 1980 – Guy Lafrance
- 1981 – Joseph Owens
- 1982 – Maurice Lagueux
- 1983 – Kai Nielsen
- 1984 – Pierre Laberge
- 1985 – Sarah Shorten
- 1986 – Nicolas Kaufmann
- 1987 – John Trentman
- 1988 – Robert Nadeau
- 1989 – Robert Butts
- 1990 – Louise Marcil
- 1991 – Michael McDonald
- 1992 – Maurice Gagnon
- 1993 – Ann MacKenzie
- 1994 – Josiane Ayoub
- 1995 – Wesley Cragg
- 1996 – Serge Robert
- 1997 – Frank Cunningham
- 1998 – François Duchesneau
- 1999 – Steven Davis
- 2000 – Thomas De Koninck
- 2001 – Andrew Brook
- 2002 – Paul Dumouchel
- 2003 – John Thorp
- 2004 – Philippe Constantineau
- 2005 – Gerard Naddaf
- 2006 – Luc Langlois
- 2007 – William Sweet
- 2008 – Jocelyne Couture
- 2009 – Bryson Brown
- 2010 – Denis Fisette
- 2011 – Ronald de Sousa
- 2012 – Adèle Mercier
- 2013 – Adam Morton
- 2014 – Frédéric Bouchard
- 2015 – Tim Kenyon
- 2016 – Sandra Lapointe
- 2017 – Samantha Brennan
- 2018 – Daniel Weinstock
- 2019 – Dominic McIver Lopes
- 2020 – Christine Tappolet
- 2021 – Jennifer Nagel
- 2022 – Claudine Verheggen
- 2023 – Arthur Sullivan
- 2024 – Ryoa Chung

== See also ==
- Philosophy in Canada
