= Loptson =

Loptson is an English surname. Notable people with the surname include:

- Asmundur Loptson (1885–1972), Canadian politician
- Peter Loptson (fl. 1982), Canadian philosopher
