= Luc Langlois =

Canadian philosopher, writer, and translator

- Born: 1963 (age 62–63); Canada
- Occupations: Philosopher, writer, translator

Academic background
- Education: Laval University (PhB, MPhil, LLB); Sorbonne University (MAS, PhD)

Luc Langlois (born 1963) is a Canadian philosopher, writer, and translator. He is a professor of philosophy at Laval University. He served as the francophone editor of the journal Dialogue: Canadian Philosophical Review.

== Early life and education ==
Luc Langlois was born in 1963 in Canada. He attended primary school and high school in Canada. He earned a bachelor in philosophy from the Laval University in 1985. He continued his studies in philosophy and received his master's in philosophy from the same university in 1986. Then, he moved to Paris and earned his Master of Advanced Studies degree from Sorbonne University (Paris IV) in 1987. He did a PhD in philosophy at the same university and received his PhD degree in philosophy in 1991. He has also a bachelor's degree in law from Laval University.

== Career ==
Langlois was Dean of Faculty of Philosophy at Laval University between 2002 and 2010, and again from 2018. He teaches the modern philosophy in the faculty of philosophy at Laval University. His expertise is in German modern philosophy (Leibniz, Kant, Fichte, German idealism, neo-Kantianism), critical theory (Habermas) and Heidegger.

Langlois is the co-author of Les philosophes et la question de Dieu (with Yves Charles Zarka, 2006). His books also include French translations of works by Immanuel Kant and Alexander Gottlieb Baumgarten.

== Awards and honors ==
- Ordre des Palmes Académiques, 2006
- President of the Canadian Philosophical Association, 2006–2007
- Francophone editor of Dialogue: Canadian Philosophical Review, 2013–2018
