= Forgiveness and Love =

2012 book by Glen Pettigrove

- Author: Glen Pettigrove
- Subject: philosophy of love, forgiveness
- Published: 2012
- Publisher: Oxford University Press
- Pages: 200 pp.
- ISBN: 9780199646555

Forgiveness and Love is a 2012 book by Glen Pettigrove, in which the author explores the nature and norms of forgiveness and examines the relationship between forgiving, understanding, and loving.
