= L'amorosa filosofia =

1577 book by Franciscus Patricius

L’amorosa filosofia
- Author: Franciscus Patricius
- Subjects: Philosophy of love ethics
- Publication place: Italy

L’amorosa filosofia is a 1577 book by the Venetian philosopher Franciscus Patricius, in which the author develops his philosophy of love and views on ethics.

== Background ==
L’amorosa filosofia belongs to the genre of the love treatise that was extremely popular in Italy in the 16th century, the trattati d'amore . It is a writing about female attractiveness and love, which Patricius wrote in Modena in 1577 but did not publish. The incompletely preserved, apparently unfinished work was only edited in 1963 based on the author's own manuscript.

== Summary ==
It consists of four dialogs. Participants in the discussion are a number of people, including the author and Bernardino Telesio as the central figure Tarquinia Molza. In the first dialogue, which makes up about half of the text, Tarquinia does not appear, but is the focus of attention because dThe participants in the discussion describe and praise their intellectual, artistic and physical advantages. According to this representation, she embodies in a unique perfection the ideal of women of her time, which is modeled on the Renaissance ideal of the universal person. She comes from a noble family, is musically and literarily well educated and an excellent poet, has a quick grasp and an excellent memory and is inspired by passionate curiosity. Her character is exemplary, her voice angelic, her beauty makes her godlike. In the remaining three dialogues, Tarquinia herself speaks and expresses her view in a high-level conversation. This is where the traditional ideas, the concepts of Platonic, courtly and the Christian love originate in the background; the self-love (philautia) is emphasized as the basis of all other manifestations of love.

== Place in the History of Philosophy ==
«Любовная философия» Ф. Патрици продолжает традиции гуманистического индивидуализма: личное благо предстает в качестве мерила нравственности.
In his L’amorosa filosofia Patricius continued the traditions of humanist individualism because personal good appeared as the measure of morality.

— Alexandr Gorfunkel

== Literature ==
- J. Ch. Nelson. Renaissance Theory of Love. N. Y., 1958.
- Горфункель, А. Х. [in Russian] (1980). "The Ethics of Philautia". Философия эпохи Возрождения: Учебное пособие (in Russian). Moscow: Высшая школа. pp. 261–263.
- Горфункель, А. Х. (1981). "Вступительная статья". In Шестаков, В.П. (ed.). Эстетика Ренессанса (in Russian). Vol. 1. Moscow: Искусство. pp. 377–378.
- Кузнецов, Б.Г. (1974). "The Metaphysics of Love". История философии для физиков и математиков [History of Philosophy for Physicists and Mathematicians] (in Russian). Moscow: Nauka. pp. 192–196. Archived from the original on 25 February 2023.
- Шестаков, В. П. (2020). Европейский эрос. Философия любви и европейское искусство [European Eros. Philosophy of Love and European Art] (in Russian). Moscow: ЛКИ. ISBN 978-5-382-01970-3.
