= Pettigrove =

Pettigrove is a surname. Notable people with the surname include:

- Glen Pettigrove, American philosopher
- Michelle Pettigrove (born 1966), Australian actress
