= Jacob M. Held =

American philosopher

Philosophical work
- Era: 21st-century philosophy
- Region: Western philosophy
- Main interests: 19th Century German philosophy, political and legal philosophy, applied ethics, existentialism, Philosophy of Religion, Medieval Philosophy

Jacob M. Held is an American philosopher and Professor of Philosophy and Assistant Provost for Academic Assessment and General Education at the University of Central Arkansas. He is known for his work at the intersection of philosophy and popular culture.

== Education ==
Held received a BS in Philosophy from the University of Wisconsin - Madison in 1998. He then attended the University of Wisconsin - Milwaukee, receiving an MA in Philosophy in 2000. His master's thesis was on John Rawls. He attended Marquette University from 2000 to 2005, receiving his PhD in December 2005. His area of focus was 19th Century German philosophy. His dissertation, "Is there a Future for Marxist Humanism?" investigated the roots of ethical Marxism in the works of Fichte, Hegel, and Feuerbach and its legacy in critical theory, focusing on the work of Erich Fromm and Axel Honneth.

== Philosophy of Sex ==
Held's work in the philosophy of sex focuses primarily on issues related to the First Amendment, obscenity law, and pornography. He has published extensively on pornography, dealing with issues such as pornography and art, pornography and discrimination, and pornography and speech. He has also published on issues related to gender, sexuality, and gay marriage.

== Books ==
- Dr. Seuss and Philosophy: Oh, the Thinks You Can Think
- More Dr. Seuss and Philosophy: Additional Hunches in Bunches
- Philosophy and Terry Pratchett (with James B. South)
- Wonder Woman and Philosophy: The Amazonian Mystique
- Roald Dahl and Philosophy: A Little Nonsense Now and Then
- Stephen King and Philosophy
- The Philosophy of Pornography: Contemporary Perspectives (with Lindsay Coleman)
- James Bond and Philosophy: Questions are Forever (with James B. South)
- The Philosophy of Sex: Contemporary Readings, co-editor with Alan Soble, Sarah Hoffman and Raja Halwani, Rowman & Littlefield Publishers 2012
