= Héctor-Neri Castañeda =

Guatemalan-American philosopher (1924–1991)

Hector-Neri Castañeda
- Born: December 13, 1924; San Vicente, Zacapa, Guatemala
- Died: September 7, 1991 (aged 66); Bloomington, Indiana, U.S.

Education
- Education: University of Minnesota (Ph.D., 1954)
- Thesis: The Logical Structure of Moral Reasoning (1954)
- Doctoral advisor: Wilfrid Sellars

Philosophical work
- Era: 20th-century philosophy
- Region: Western philosophy
- School: Analytic philosophy
- Institutions: Duke University; Wayne State University; University of Texas at Austin; Indiana University Bloomington
- Doctoral students: Tomis Kapitan; William J. Rapaport
- Main interests: Philosophy of language, metaphysics, ethics, deontic logic, moral reasoning
- Notable ideas: Guise theory, dual predication, quasi-indexical

Héctor-Neri Castañeda (Spanish: [kastaˈɲeða]; December 13, 1924 – September 7, 1991) was a Guatemalan-American philosopher and founder of the journal Noûs.

== Biography ==
Born in San Vicente, Zacapa, Guatemala, he emigrated to the United States in 1948 and studied under Wilfrid Sellars at the University of Minnesota, where he earned a B.A. in 1950 and M.A. in 1952. Castañeda received his Ph.D. in June 1954 from the University of Minnesota for his dissertation The Logical Structure of Moral Reasoning. Sellars served as his doctoral advisor. He studied at Oxford University from 1955 to 1956, after which he once again returned to the U.S. to take a sabbatical-replacement position in philosophy at Duke University. Castañeda is noted for his development of guise theory, which he applied to outstanding problems in the analysis of thought, language, and the structure of the world. He is also credited with the discovery of the "quasi-indexical".

He died of a brain tumor in 1991.

== Academic career ==
Following his brief stay at Duke University, Castañeda's first full-time academic appointment was as a professor in the Philosophy department at Wayne State University, where he taught from 1957 to 1969. It was there that he founded the philosophical journal Noûs, in 1967. From 1962 to 1963, he was also a visiting professor at the University of Texas at Austin. He was granted a fellowship from the Guggenheim Foundation between 1967 and 1968.

He moved to Indiana University in 1969, and eventually became the Mahlon Powell Professor of Philosophy as well as that university's first Dean of Latino Affairs, a position he held from 1978 to 1981. He was a fellow at the Center for Advanced Study in the Behavioral Sciences from 1981 to 1982.

== Philosophical work ==
=== Guise theory ===
Castañeda started from the fact that thoughts about real things in the world are of a fundamentally similar nature to thoughts about things in the imagination, it is still a thought, and from there he hypothesized an entire realm of abstract objects (he calls it "abstractist ontology") that included both the real and the imagined. He referred to these objects collectively as "guises", and argued that they could be treated as sets of properties. He went on to develop the guise theory of intentionality and analyse all of language and perception in terms of these guises, ultimately developing an entire metaphysics based on them.

One noted critic of guise theory was Alvin Plantinga, who developed his own rival theory involving a realm of abstract objects. Both theories were in fact based on even earlier work developed by Alexius Meinong. They differed, however, in the details of their metaphysical system and in how they regarded the basic building blocks of their respective systems.

Castañeda's theory was temporarily undermined by the problem posed by Romane Clark's paradox, a paradox in naive predication theory. Castañeda worked out a solution to block the paradox.

=== Deontic logic ===
In deontic logic, Castañeda rejected Ross's paradox "on the grounds that the inference is only pragmatically odd in ways that are independently predictable by any adequate theory of the pragmatics of deontic language."

=== Quasi-indexical ===
Castañeda introduced the concept of the quasi-indexical (or quasi-indicator), a linguistic device by which one person can attribute an indexical reference to another. His discussion on this matter strongly influenced John Perry's theory of indexicals, an influence which Perry acknowledged in the first footnote of the paper "The Problem of the Essential Indexical" (1979).

== Awards and honors ==
In addition to his other academic honors, Castañeda received grants from the National Endowment for the Humanities, the Andrew W. Mellon Foundation, and the National Science Foundation. He served as president of the American Philosophical Association Central Division from 1979 to 1980, and was named to the American Academy of Arts and Sciences in 1990. Castañeda was awarded the Presidential Medal of Honor by the Government of Guatemala in 1991.

== Select publications ==
- "On the Semantics of the Ought-to-Do", Synthese, 21, 3/4, Semantics of Natural Language, 1970, pp. 449–468.
- "Intentions and the Structure of Intending", The Journal of Philosophy, 68, 1971, pp. 453–466.
- The Structure of Morality, Springfield: Thomas, 1974.
- Thinking and Doing. The Philosophical Foundations of Institutions, Dordrecht, Reidel, 1975.
- On Philosophical Method, Detroit: Nous publications, 1980.
- "The Paradoxes of Deontic Logic: The Simplest Solution to All of Them in One Fell Swoop", in Risto Hilpinen (ed.), New Studies in Deontic Logic, Dordrecht: Reidel, 1981, pp. 37–85.
- Thinking, Language and Experience, Minneapolis: University of Minnesota Press, 1989.
- The Phenomeno-Logic of the I. Essays on Self-consciousness, edited by James G. Hart and Tomis Kapitan, Bloomington: Indiana University Press, 1999.
- Sprache und Erfahrung. Texte zu einer neue Ontologie (Eingeleitet und übersetzt von Helmut Pape), Frankfurt a.M.: Suhrkamp, 1982.

== Sources ==
- Adriano Palma, ed. (2014). Castañeda and His Guises: Essays on the Work of Hector-Neri Castañeda. Boston/Berlin: Walter de Gruyter.
