= Kai Nielsen (philosopher) =

Canadian philosopher (1926–2021)

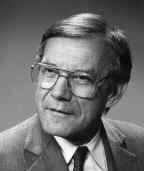
- Born: May 15, 1926; Marshall, Michigan, U.S.
- Died: April 7, 2021 (aged 94); Montreal, Quebec, Canada
- Education: University of North Carolina at Chapel Hill; Duke University
- Occupations: Philosophy professor, author

Kai Nielsen (May 15, 1926 – April 7, 2021) was an American professor of philosophy at the University of Calgary. He specialized in naturalism, metaphilosophy, ethics, analytic philosophy, social and political philosophy. Nielsen also wrote about philosophy of religion, and was an advocate of contemporary atheism. He was also known for his defense of utilitarianism, writing in response to Bernard Williams's criticism of it.

== Biography ==
Born on May 15, 1926, in Marshall, Michigan, near Battle Creek, Michigan, Kai Edward Nielsen was raised in Moline, Illinois.

His father was from Copenhagen, Denmark, and spoke Danish and Swedish. As he said about his father later, "My father was a Danish immigrant who came to New York City when he was fifteen. He didn’t know a word of English then. They put him into the first grade in school and he hated it. What could he do? He couldn’t speak any English and here he was with these little English-speaking kids. He was fifteen and they were five or six. He left school and just sort of made it on his own, as you could still do then."

His mother was American but according to Nielsen she "was Métis. Her mother came from Lac St. Jean, though she herself never spoke French. Her mother immigrated early to the United States before she could speak." He told the following story to illustrate the difference between his mother and his father: "A few years before the Second World War, a friend of my father, who was his subordinate in an insurance company where my father was a superintendent, was invited to our summer home. This was during the Joe Louis/Max Schmeling boxing match. We were at our summer house, which had a big American flag on one wall and a big Danish flag on the other. This friend of my father, whom I called Uncle Percy, began to talk about Hitler – the Louis/Schmeling fight was a big German-American affair – and he said, “Well, there was one good thing Hitler did. He got after the Jews.” My mother got up and walked out of the room and, after he had left, she told my father to never let Uncle Percy into the house again."

== Upbringing ==
In an interview given later in his life, Nielsen explained what had moved him to the "left (I would never have so called it then)" by telling two stories from his childhood about class and race: "I grew up in a little Midwestern American town during the Great Depression where I saw, as a little boy, a number of things that left their mark on me. My parents did financially well during the Depression, as they had before and did after it. For example, we had a maid to pick up after us, particularly me. But across the ravine from our house lived a bunch of poor people and, as you know kids will do, I used to go home after school with some of my schoolmates to play ball with them. In one of the houses I visited, the only ball they had was something they had tied together with string. I remember that the house was unheated and the mother’s face looked ravaged. There was almost no furniture. The father was away on the road looking for work. Many of the houses in our town were like that. But when I came home, I had a maid that picked up my clothes and books wherever I threw them. I had warmth and comfort and plenty to eat. I couldn’t believe that this difference could be right. I realized then there was something wrong with the kind of society that would allow this. I had various awarenesses of this. Seeing, for example, people that worked on Work Projects Administration (the Roosevelt Administration’s project for creating jobs), standing in lines leaning on their shovels. I remember asking my father (who was conservative, though I, in those days, never thought about this) as we drove by our big car – a predecessor of the Cadillac – “Who are these people?” And he said, “People hired by Roosevelt for the Works Project Administration. They could get real jobs if they wanted them. They don’t have to live off the dole.” It was experiences like this that impressed me and rooted what would become my turn to the left, later my firm socialism. If only my father would have read Upton Sinclair’s The Jungle. Another example, this one racial: One of my close schoolboy friends was black – a Negro, as we said then. One day after school, I invited him to come home with me to play. I noticed when we entered the house that our maid, who was Swedish, looked startled when she saw him. When he left, my mother came to me and said, “Don’t ever bring George back here again.” And my father, to stamp this in, called up George’s father and told him not to allow George to come back."

== Education ==
Nielsen went to middle school, and high school for two years, in Moline. He then switched to St. Ambrose Academy, part of St. Ambrose College (now St. Ambrose University (since 1987)), in nearby Davenport, Iowa, because he wanted to play on their basketball team. After graduating from high school, he spent three months in officers' training school and served the last two years of the Second World War in the merchant marine, in the Pacific, on a merchant ship. They were attacked once by a Japanese plane but were not hit. After the war, he attended St. Ambrose College for two years. St. Ambrose was a Catholic school. Nielsen was struggling with religious belief at the time, after having read some philosophy during the war: "After the war, I went back to St. Ambrose for two years of college before I transferred to the University of North Carolina. So my first college (university) was a Catholic school. There were two people who influenced me there. One was a priest who knew a lot about literature and talked about it in a really interesting way. The other was a layman who came from Montreal and had studied at the University of Toronto – at St. Michael’s College – with Gilson and Maritain. His name was Frederich Flynn and he taught philosophy at this small Catholic college. You had to take a lot of philosophy in Catholic schools back then. Perhaps you still do. It was required and most of the students – most of them Catholics – hated it. Most of these courses at that school were unbelievably boring, taught by priests from scholastic manuals and most of these priests were not very interested in philosophy. I took a course from Flynn who taught Plato, Aristotle, and Aquinas. He was very different from the rest. When he talked about Aquinas, instead of just saying the proofs work, he said there were problems with them. And we talked about them and he found that I had an interest in these things. I was by then struggling with religion and he told me I should also read some Scotus, Ockham, and Maimonides and to read the philosophers themselves, not just the manuals. He impressed me and made me interested in philosophy. It was at this time that I also read Santayana and that had a secularizing effect on me. My previous wartime reading of Nietzsche and Dewey had a similar effect. At that time in my life, there were lots of conflicting currents tumbling around in me."

Nielsen then transferred to the University of North Carolina at Chapel Hill, where he received his A.B. degree, summa cum laude, with an honors thesis on James Joyce. During his time at Chapel Hill, Nielsen became radicalized: "The University of North Carolina was not only segregated by race but by gender as well. There were only male students at UNC initially (except for graduate school). This was also the case when I taught at Hamilton College and Amherst College. I guess there are only two all-male schools left in the United States now [2012], but back then there were a lot of them. But there was also racial segregation in North Carolina, including at the liberal University of North Carolina. The University of North Carolina and Duke University had no black students at all. That was called “separate but equal.” But that, of course, was not true. By that time, I was sensitized to this, so I joined various challenging movements, particularly radical ones, though in the eyes of the establishment, they were all radical movements. It was a period during which I quickly became very radical."

In the same interview, Nielsen described being the victim of a racist intimidation: "During a U.S. presidential race, Henry Wallace (not George Wallace), who had been vice president under Truman, formed a new party and ran for president. I joined a student movement supporting Wallace. (Wallace was a kind of social democrat but his party made the tactical mistake of accepting help from the American Communist Party and that finished them.) Paul Robeson, a black and prominent member of the Communist Party, was an articulate supporter of Wallace. I had seen Paul Robeson play the lead part in Othello in San Francisco during the war when I was still in the service. I remember responding then, “Jesus, what is this?” I was spellbound. We students at Chapel Hill arranged for Paul Robeson to come to campus to talk in support of Wallace and this third party. But he was a member of the Communist Party and by that time had been blacklisted. The university, after a lot of liberal dithering, finally said we could not meet in the lecture hall we had planned for and with their initial agreement. So we went to an empty lot that belonged to a gas station in downtown Chapel Hill that had closed for the evening. I introduced Robeson and he talked there. For that I got a cross burned in front of my house that night."

Nielsen went to graduate school in philosophy at nearby Duke University, in Durham, North Carolina, and received his PhD from Duke in 1959. During those years at university he also published a novel.

== Teaching career ==
Nielsen taught at Hamilton College before getting hired at Amherst College, where he taught for three years in the Department of Philosophy and Religion. After a meeting with Sidney Hook at Amherst, he was invited to join the philosophy department at New York University, where he eventually became chair of the department. During the Vietnam War, he moved to the University of Calgary.

Nielsen was a member of the Royal Society of Canada and a past president (in 1983) of the Canadian Philosophical Association.

Nielsen was also one of the founding members of the Canadian Journal of Philosophy.

In 1973 Nielsen was one of the signers of the Humanist Manifesto II.

He wrote or edited over 40 books on topics such as Marxism, metaphilosophy and ethical and political theory.

In 2007, Reason and Emancipation: Essays on the Philosophy of Kai Nielsen, edited by Michel Seymour and Matthias Fritsch, was published, with contributions from Anthony Kenny, Nicholas Wolterstorff, Richard Rorty, and Steven Lukes, among others. This book was published after a conference in honor of Nielsen was held in October 2003 at Concordia University.

Nielsen died in April 2021 at the age of 94.

== Publications ==
=== Books ===
- Pessimism of the Intellect, Optimism of the Will: The Political Philosophy of Kai Nielsen, Edited by David Rondel and Alex Sager, 2012. ISBN 978-1-55238-530-2
- Wittgensteinian Fideism? (with D. Z. Philips), 2006. ISBN 0-334-04005-1
- Atheism And Philosophy, 2005. (re-publication of Philosophy and Atheism, 1985, with new preface) ISBN 1-59102-298-3
- Globalization And Justice, 2002. ISBN 1-59102-054-9
- Naturalism and Religion, 2001, ISBN 1-57392-853-4
- Exploitation, 2001. ISBN 0-391-04000-6
- Why Be Moral?, 1997. ISBN 0-87975-519-9
- Naturalism Without Foundations, 1996. ISBN 1-57392-076-24
- On Transforming Philosophy: A Metaphilosophical Inquiry. 1995, ISBN 0-8133-0666-3
- Does God Exist?: The Debate Between Theists and Atheists (with J. P. Moreland), 1993. ISBN 978-0879758233
- God and the Grounding Of Morality, 1991. ISBN 0-7766-0328-0
- After the Demise of the Tradition: Rorty, Critical Theory, and the Fate of Philosophy, 1991. ISBN 0-8133-8044-8
- Ethics without God, 1990. ISBN 0-87975-552-0
- God, Skepticism and Modernity, 1989. ISBN 0-7766-0241-1
- Marxism and the Moral Point of View: Morality, Ideology, and Historical Materialism, 1989. ISBN 0-8133-0653-1
- Equality and Liberty: A Defense of Radical Egalitarianism, 1986. ISBN 0-8476-7516-5
- Philosophy and Atheism, 1985. ISBN 0-87975-289-0
- An Introduction to the Philosophy of Religion, 1983. ISBN 0-312-43310-7
- Marx and Morality, 1981. ISBN 0-919491-01-4
- Scepticism, 1973. ISBN 0-333-10263-0
- Ethics Without God, 1973, revised edition 1990. ISBN 978-0879755522
- Reason and Practice: A Modern Introduction to Philosophy, 1971. ISBN 0-06-044836-9
- Contemporary Critiques of Religion, 1971. ISBN 0-333-06963-3
- Ethics Without God, 1971. ISBN 0-301-73021-0

== See also ==
- Existence of God
- New York University Department of Philosophy

== Sources ==
- Pojman, L. The Moral Life, OUP, 2001. ISBN 0-19-516608-6
