= The Dialectic of Essence =

2003 book by Allan Silverman

The Dialectic of Essence: A Study of Plato's Metaphysics
- Author: Allan Silverman
- Published: 2003
- Publisher: Princeton University Press
- Pages: 408 pp.
- ISBN: 9780691091792

The Dialectic of Essence: A Study of Plato's Metaphysics is a 2003 book by Allan Silverman in which he offers an account of Plato's metaphysics. Silverman believes that the proper way to make sense of the metaphysics is to consider carefully what Plato says about ousia (essence). This book is focused on three basic aspects of the metaphysics: the theory of Forms, the nature of particulars, and Plato's conception of the nature of metaphysical inquiry.
