= Tomis Kapitan =

American philosopher (1949–2016)

- Born: 1949
- Died: 2016 (aged 66–67)

Education
- Education: Indiana University Bloomington (PhD)
- Thesis: Foundations for a Theory of Propositional Form, Implication, Alethic Modality, and Generalization
- Doctoral advisor: Héctor-Neri Castañeda

Philosophical work
- Era: Contemporary philosophy
- Region: Western philosophy
- School: Analytic
- Institutions: Northern Illinois University
- Main interests: Metaphysics, philosophy of language

Tomis Kapitan (1949–2016) was an American philosopher and Distinguished Teaching Professor Emeritus at Northern Illinois University. He worked primarily in metaphysics and philosophy of language. Kapitan was especially interested in the free will debate, where he was a "compatibilist," defending the view that free will is possible even in a completely deterministic universe. He also published in philosophy of religion and wrote extensively on the Palestine-Israeli conflict.

== Books ==
- The Israeli-Palestinian Conflict: Philosophical Essays on Self-Determination, Terrorism and the One-State Solution, with Raja Halwani Springer 2007
- The Phenomeno-Logic of the I: Essays on Self-Consciousness
- Archaeology, History and Culture in Palestine and the Near East: essays in memory of Albert E Glock
