= Thomas De Koninck =

Canadian philosopher (1934–2026)

Thomas De Koninck (26 March 1934 – 16 February 2026) was a Canadian philosopher from Québec.

== Life and career ==
De Koninck was born in Leuven in 1934. After studying at Oxford (M.A.), Université Laval (Ph.D), and Freie Universität Berlin, he became professor at University of Notre Dame (1960–1964) in the United States and at Université Laval (from 1964) in Québec. A well-known rumour posits that as a child he inspired Antoine de Saint-Exupéry's character The Little Prince when Saint-Exupéry was living in the house of his father, Charles De Koninck, in Québec City, in 1942. He was awarded an honorary doctorate from Saint Francis Xavier University (2018) and was elected a Corresponding Member of the Institut de France (Académie des Sciences morales et politiques) (2019). De Koninck died in Québec on 16 February 2026, at the age of 91.

== Books by Thomas De Koninck ==
- Urgence de la philosophie : actes du Colloque du cinquantenaire de la Faculté, Université Laval, 1985, with Lucien Morin (ed.), Québec, Les Presses de l'Université Laval, 1985.
- La question de Dieu selon Aristote et Hegel, with Guy-Planty Bonjour (ed.), Paris, PUF, 1991.
- De la dignité humaine, Paris, PUF, "Quadrige", 1995, 2nd ed. in 2002 (Prize "La Bruyère" of the Académie française, 1996) - Spanish translation.
- Actes du colloque "Sens et Savoir" (ed.), Laval théologique et philosophique, vol. 52, num. 2, June 1996, 615 pages.
- Actes du colloque international Descartes, with Jean-Luc Marion and Jean-Marc Narbonne (org.), Laval théologique et philosophique, vol. 53, num. 3, October 1997.
- La nouvelle ignorance et le problème de la culture, Paris, PUF, "Intervention philosophique", 2000 - Portuguese, Turkish, Romanian and Arabic translations.
- La question de Dieu (ed.), Laval théologique et philosophique, vol. 58, num. 3, October 2002.
- Philosophie de l'éducation. Essai sur le devenir humain, Paris, PUF, "Thémis", 2004 - Portuguese translation.
- La dignité humaine. Philosophie, droit, politique, économie, médecine, with Gilbert Larochelle (ed.), Paris, PUF, 2005.
- Relire Platon (ed.), Laval théologique et philosophique, vol. 62, num. 2, June 2006.
- La crise de l’éducation, Montréal, Fides, 2007.
- Aristote, l'intelligence et Dieu, Paris, PUF, Chaire Étienne Gilson, 2008.
- Philosophie de l'éducation pour l'avenir, Québec, Les Presses de l'Université Laval, 2010.
- Questions ultimes, Ottawa, Les Presses de l'Université d'Ottawa, "Philosophica", 2012 (Prize of the Canadian Philosophical Association, 2013).
- La foi est-elle irrationnelle ?, with Louis Roy, Montréal, Fides, 2013.
- À quoi sert la philosophie ?, Paris/Québec, Hermann/Les Presses de l'Université Laval, 2015.
- Dignité de la personne et primauté du bien commun, Saarbrücken, Éditions universitaires européennes, 2016.
- Beauty obliges. Ecology and dignity (english translation), with J.-F. de Raymond, Québec, Presses de l'Université Laval, 2018.

== Books and papers on Thomas De Koninck ==
- Pierre-Alexandre Fradet, Le désir du réel dans la philosophie québécoise, Montréal, Nota bene, coll. Territoires philosophiques, 2022, 246 p.
- Thierry Bissonnette, Thomas De Koninck, attiseur de consciences, Montréal, Varia, 2007.
- Jean-François Mattéi and Jean-Marc Narbonne (ed.), La transcendance de l'homme : études en hommage à Thomas De Koninck, Québec, Les Presses de l'Université Laval, 2012 - with contributions of Jean-François Mattéi, Jean-Marc Narbonne, Jean-Luc Marion, Chantal Delsol, Leslie Armour, Luc Langlois, Jean-François de Raymond, Gilbert Larochelle, Yves Charles Zarka, Gabor Csepregi, Rémi Brague, Dominique Folscheid et Jean-Jacques Wunenburger.
- Sigal Samuel, "Hunting for the Little Prince", The Rumpus, 14 June 2014.
- Pierre-Alexandre Fradet, "Un humanisme de l'au-delà : sens commun et puissance spéculative chez Thomas De Koninck", Science et Esprit, vol. 66, num. 3, Falls 2014, pp. 379–394.

== Honors ==
- Rhodes Scholarship (1956–1959)
- Alexander von Humboldt Foundation (1972–1973, and 1990)
- Prize La Bruyère of l'Académie française for De la dignité humaine (1996)
- Member of the Ordre des Palmes académiques, France (1996)
- "Popular Prof" in the Maclean's Guide to Canadian Universities (1999)
- Member of l'Académie des lettres et sciences humaines of the Royal Society of Canada (2002)
- Prize of excellence in teaching of the Université Laval (2002)
- Owner of the "Chaire de recherche et d'enseignement La philosophie dans le monde actuel" of the Université Laval (2004 - )
- Member of the Order of Canada (2005)
- Owner of the "Chaire Étienne Gilson", Paris (2007-2008)
- "Médaille Gloire de l'Escolle" of l'Université Laval (2010)
- Prize of the Canadian Philosophical Association for Questions ultimes (2013)
