= Peter Loptson =

Canadian philosopher

Education
- Education: BA (York University), MA & PhD (University of Pittsburgh)

Philosophical work
- Era: 20th‑ and 21st‑century philosophy
- Region: Western philosophy
- Institutions: University of Guelph, University of Saskatchewan
- Main interests: Metaphysics, human nature, history of philosophy

Peter Loptson is a Canadian philosopher whose work spans metaphysics, human nature, and the history of philosophy. He is professor at the University of Guelph in Ontario, having previously taught at the University of Saskatchewan. He served as co-editor of Hume Studies between 2005 and 2010 and as co-editor of Dialogue between 1996 and 2000.

== Books ==
- Freedom, Nature, and World. University of Ottawa Press, 2007.
- Philosophy, History, and Myth. University Press of America, 2002.
- Reality: Fundamental Topics in Metaphysics. University of Toronto Press, 2001. 2nd edition (paperback) University of Ottawa Press, 2010.
- Theories of Human Nature. Broadview Press, 1995. 2nd edition 2001. 3rd edition 2006.

=== edited ===
- G. W. Leibniz, Discourse on Metaphysics and Monadology. Broadview Press, forthcoming, 2011.
- Readings on Human Nature. Broadview Press, 1998.
- Anne Conway, The Principles of the Most Ancient and Modern Philosophy. Martinus Nijhoff, 1982. 2nd edition. Scholars' Facsimiles and Reprints, 1998.
