= Allan Silverman =

American philosopher (born 1955)

- Born: 1955 (age 70–71)
- Awards: Mershon Center for International Security Fellowship, Senior Fellowship for University Teachers (NEH), University Distinguished Visiting Research Fellowship

Education
- Education: University of California, Berkeley (PhD) Ohio State University (BA)
- Thesis: Studies in Plato's Theory of Knowledge (1985)

Philosophical work
- Era: 21st-century philosophy
- Region: Western philosophy
- School: Ancient philosophy
- Institutions: Ohio State University
- Doctoral students: Dirk Baltzly
- Website: Mershon Center

Allan Jay Silverman (born 1955) is an American philosopher and Professor of Philosophy at the Ohio State University. He is also a Faculty Fellow at Mershon Center for International Security Studies. Silverman is known for his expertise on ancient philosophy.

== Books ==
- The Dialectic of Essence: A Study of Plato's Metaphysics, Princeton University Press, 2003
