= Jennifer Nagel =

Canadian philosopher

Education
- Education: University of Toronto (BA); University of Pittsburgh (MA, PhD)
- Thesis: The Role of Necessity in Empirical Knowledge (2000)
- Doctoral advisor: John McDowell

Philosophical work
- Institutions: University of Toronto
- Main interests: Epistemology, philosophy of mind, philosophy of artificial intelligence, metacognition
- Website: jennifernagel.net

Jennifer Nagel is a Canadian philosopher at the University of Toronto Mississauga. Her research focuses on epistemology, philosophy of mind, and metacognition. She has also written on 17th century (Western) philosophy, especially John Locke and René Descartes. She has been acting chair of the University of Toronto Mississauga's philosophy department since July 2026.

== Education and career ==
After a B.A. in philosophy at the University of Toronto, Nagel earned her M.A. (1994) and Ph.D. (2000) in Philosophy at the University of Pittsburgh. Her dissertation, The Role of Necessity in Empirical Knowledge, was written under the supervision of John McDowell.

She joined the University of Toronto as a professor at its Mississauga campus in the year 2000.

In September 2015, Nagel founded a group called Room for More, a Toronto-based group sponsoring Syrian Refugees coming to Canada, in partnership with Humanity First.

Nagel was President of the Central Division of the American Philosophical Association in 2018–19. She was later president of the Canadian Philosophical Association from 2021 to 2022. Nagel is the program chair for the 2026 APA Central Division meeting.

== Philosophical work ==
Much of Nagel's research draws on empirical developments from the cognitive sciences and experimental philosophy in order to address longstanding questions in epistemology and philosophy of mind. For example, Nagel is well known for defending the value of intuitions in philosophical methodology. While the emergence of experimental philosophy in the 21st century has often cast doubt on the reliability of intuitions, Nagel argues that intuitions about particular cases and thought experiments are a legitimate source of knowledge and justification. Nagel also argues, building on suggestions made by Timothy Williamson, that knowledge is a mental state. Whereas knowledge is traditionally thought to be reducible to a form of belief, i.e., a justified and true belief, Nagel argues that knowledge should itself be counted among the fundamental types of mental state, on a par with beliefs, desires, intentions, and so on.

Nagel is the author of Knowledge: A Very Short Introduction, which has been praised as an "admirably clear and engaging" introduction to epistemology. Nagel considers classic questions, including about skepticism, rationalism, and empiricism, as well as more contemporary concerns, such as whether Wikipedia, "where most articles have multiple and anonymous authors", can be a reliable source of knowledge. In 2023, she gave the John Locke Lectures at the University of Oxford, on recognising knowledge. She argues that human beings have a strong evolved capacity to identify knowledge, but in order to ensure flexibility in our exercise of this capacity, we engage in strategic mapping of others 'epistemic territory': the domains in which they enjoy knowledge. This can involve supposing that others know less than they do, in order to reason about how things would be if they did know less. However useful such strategic thinking about knowledge may be overall, suppositions of ignorance risk confusing our capacities for knowledge recognition, thus explaining the appeal of scepticism.

== Bibliography ==
- "The Psychological Context of Contextualism" (with Julia Jael Smith), forthcoming in The Routledge Handbook of Epistemic Contextualism. Jonathan Ichikawa, ed. (Routledge).
- "Armchair-Friendly Experimental Philosophy" (with Kaija Mortensen), (2016) in A Companion to Experimental Philosophy, Justin Sytsma and Wesley Buckwalter, eds. (Blackwell).
- "Knowledge and Reliability", forthcoming in Alvin Goldman and his Critics, Hilary Kornblith and Brian McLaughlin, eds.
- "Sensitive Knowledge: Locke on Skepticism and Sensation", in The Blackwell Companion to Locke, Matthew Stuart, ed. Malden, MA: Blackwell, 2015, 313–333.
- "The Social Value of Reasoning", Episteme 12:2 (2015), 297–308.
- "The Meanings of Metacognition", Philosophy and Phenomenological Research 89:3 (2014), 710–718.
- "Intuition, Reflection, and the Command of Knowledge", Proceedings of the Aristotelian Society, Supplementary Volume 88 (2014), 217–39.
- "The Reliability of Epistemic Intuitions" (with Kenneth Boyd), in Current Controversies in Experimental Philosophy, Edouard Machery, ed., New York: Routledge, 2014, 109–127.
- "Authentic Gettier Cases: a reply to Starmans and Friedman" (with Valerie San Juan and Raymond A. Mar), Cognition 129 (2013), 666–669.
- "Lay Denial of Knowledge for Justified True Beliefs" (with Valerie San Juan and Raymond A. Mar), Cognition 129 (2013), 652–661.
- "Defending the Evidential Value of Epistemic Intuitions: A Reply to Stich", Philosophy and Phenomenological Research 86:1 (2013), 179–199.
- "Knowledge as a Mental State", Oxford Studies in Epistemology 4 (2013), 275–310.
- "Motivating Williamson’s Model Gettier Cases", Inquiry 56:1 (2013), 54–62.
- "Intuitions and Experiments: A Defence of the Case Method in Epistemology", Philosophy and Phenomenological Research 85:3 (2012).
- "The Attitude of Knowledge", Philosophy and Phenomenological Research 84:3 (2012), 678–685.
- "Mindreading in Gettier Cases and Skeptical Pressure Cases", in Knowledge Ascription: New Essays, Jessica Brown and Mikkel Gerken, eds. (Oxford University Press, 2012), 171–191
- "The Psychological Basis of the Harman-Vogel Paradox", Philosophers' Imprint 11:5 (March 2011), 1-28.
- "Epistemic Anxiety and Adaptive Invariantism", Philosophical Perspectives 24 (2010), 407–435.
- "Knowledge Ascriptions and the Psychological Consequences of Thinking about Error", Philosophical Quarterly 60:239 (2010), 286–306.
- "Knowledge Ascriptions and the Psychological Consequences of Changing Stakes", Australasian Journal of Philosophy 86 (2008), 279–294.
- "Epistemic Intuitions", Philosophy Compass 2:6 (November 2007), 792–819.
- "Contemporary Skepticism and the Cartesian God", Canadian Journal of Philosophy (September 2005), 465–497.
- "The Empiricist Conception of Experience", Philosophy 75 (July 2000), 345-376
