= David Braybrooke =

Political philosopher (1924–2013)

David Braybrooke FRSC
- Born: October 18, 1924; Hackettstown, New Jersey, US
- Died: August 7, 2013 (aged 88); Austin, Texas, US
- Spouses: Alice Noble (m. 1948; div. 1982); Margaret Odell (m. 1984, divorced); Michiko Gomyo (m. 1994)

Academic background
- Education: Harvard University; Cornell University
- Thesis: Welfare, Happiness, and the Choice of Policies (1953)
- Influences: Brooks Otis

Academic work
- Discipline: Philosophy; political studies
- Sub-discipline: Ethics; political philosophy
- School or tradition: Analytic philosophy; utilitarianism
- Institutions: Yale University; Dalhousie University; University of Texas at Austin

David Braybrooke FRSC (October 18, 1924 – August 7, 2013) was a political philosopher and professor emeritus at both Dalhousie University in Halifax, Nova Scotia, Canada, and the University of Texas at Austin.

== Early life and education ==
Braybrooke was born on October 18, 1924, in Hackettstown, New Jersey. He graduated from Boonton High School in 1942 and volunteered for the army. After the war, he received a BA in economics from Harvard in 1948, followed by a MA in philosophy from Cornell University and a PhD in philosophy at Cornell in 1953, where he wrote a dissertation on welfare and happiness. He also studied English for a term under F. R. Leavis at Downing College, Cambridge.

== Academic career ==
Braybrooke was an instructor of philosophy at the University of Michigan (1953–54) and Bowdoin College (1954–56), and assistant professor at Yale University (1956–63), where he taught in an interdisciplinary economics and politics program. He also continued post-doctoral studies at New College, Oxford (American Council Learned Societies Fellow, 1953) and at Balliol College, Oxford (Rockefeller Foundation grantee, 1959–60). In 1962, he was awarded a Guggenheim Fellowship, and in 1963 he began teaching at Dalhousie, where he remained until his retirement in 1990, after which he was made McCulloch Professor of Philosophy and Politics Emeritus.

Although Dalhousie lacked a doctoral program until shortly before he retired, Braybrooke had a major influence on his junior colleagues, especially Alexander Rosenberg.

He continued to teach until 2005, at the University of Texas at Austin, holding the Centennial Commission Chair in the Liberal Arts as a Professor of Government and Philosophy.

While at Dalhousie, he was visiting professor at the University of Pittsburgh (1965–66); the University of Toronto (1966–67); the University of Minnesota (1971); the University of California, Irvine (1980); the University of Chicago (1984); Tulane University (1988). He was also a visiting fellow at Wolfson College, Cambridge (1985–86); Cecil H. & Ida Green Visiting Professor of Philosophy, University of British Columbia (Oct. 1986); John Milton Scott Visiting Professor of Philosophy, Queen's University at Kingston (Oct. 1988).

== Research ==
Braybrooke's research interests included problems in ethics, philosophy, and political and social science, and he authored over 150 articles, book chapters and scholarly reviews, and 11 books, including A Strategy of Decision (with C. E. Lindblom) (1963), Three Tests for Democracy (1967), Philosophy of Social Science (1987), Meeting Needs (1987), and Logic on the Track of Social Change (with Bryson Brown and Peter K. Schotch) (1995). Another book in which he had a large part, Social Rules, came out in 1996. The University of Toronto Press published a collection of his essays, Moral Objectives, Rules, and the Forms of Social Change, in 1998, and, in 2001, Natural Law Modernized, came out at the same press, as did Utilitarianism: Restorations; Repairs; Renovations in 2004. University of Toronto Press published a fourth book in this series in 2006, Analytical Political Philosophy: From Discourse, Edification.

As Susan Sherwin wrote in the introduction to Engaged Philosophy: Essays in Honour of David Braybrooke, his "aim is to help guide policy debates by allowing participants to determine appropriate rules for attending to the needs of citizens of nations and of the world in a fair and achievable way."

== Honours ==
Braybrooke was President of the Canadian Association of University Teachers (1974–75), President of the Canadian Philosophical Association (1971–72), and Vice President of the American Political Science Association (1981–82). He was elected to the Royal Society of Canada in 1980. Dalhousie University awarded Braybrooke the degree of Doctor of Laws, honoris causa, in 2013.

Braybrooke died August 7, 2013, in Austin, Texas.
