= Adèle Mercier =

Canadian philosopher

Adèle G. Mercier (born 1958) is a Canadian philosopher, currently employed at Queen's University, Kingston, and fellow of LOGOS- Language, Logic and Cognition at the University of Barcelona, Spain. She studied at the University of Ottawa (BA and MA) and UCLA (MA and PhD in Philosophy, MA and CPhil in Linguistics).

Mercier works in the areas of philosophy of language, philosophy of mind, natural language semantics, philosophy of linguistics, and related areas in logic and metaphysics. She has written on the linguistics of gender-neutral language, and its connection with grammatical gender; also on racist language. She has acted as expert witness in Canadian courts, defending gay couples seeking the right to marry against the claim that same-sex marriage is rendered logically impossible by the semantics of English.

In 2012–13 she was president of the Canadian Philosophical Association.

In 2018, she became the first professor in the (recorded legal) history of Canada to be awarded punitive damages against a university in a labour dispute, for "unfair, unreasonable, exceptional, unprecedented, deliberate and therefore egregious" treatment by her employer.

== Publications ==
Her publications include:

- The Structural and the Semantic: Subject-Object and Referential-Predicative Asymmetries."Theories of Everything, Festschrift in Honour of Edward L. Keenan, UCLA Working Papers in Linguistics", Vol.17, No 29, 2012
- Religious Belief and Self-Deception. "Voices of Disbelief" (ed. R. Blackford, U. Schuklenk), 2009.
- On the Nature of Marriage: Somerville on Same-Sex Marriage & Reply to Lee. "The Monist", 91. 2008.
- Meaning and Necessity: Can Semantics Stop Same-Sex Marriage? "Essays in Philosophy", vol 8, 2007.
- L'homme et la factrice: sur la logique du genre en français. "Dialogue", Volume 41, Issue 03, 2002
- On Communication-Based De Re Thought, Commitments De Dicto, and Word-Individuation. "Philosophy and Linguistics" (ed. R. Stainton), Westview Press, 1998
- A Perverse Case of the Contingent A Priori: On the Logic of Emasculating Language (A Reply to Dawkins and Dummett). "Philosophical Topics" (special ed. S. Haslanger), Arkansas University Press, 1996
- Consumerism and Language Acquisition. "Linguistics and Philosophy", Vol.17, No 5, 1994
- Normativism and the Mental: A Problem of Language Individuation. "Philosophical Studies", Vol.72, No 1, 1993

Other major writings include:

- On the History, Semantics, Pragmatics and Normativity of ‘house negro’ (and its Difference From ‘nigger’).

Superior Court of Ontario, Expert witness in St. Lewis v. Rancourt defamation case, 2014

- The concept of marriage. Expert witness for applicants in Halpern v. Canada (A.G. Ontario Superior Court of Justice: Court files 684/00, 30/2001), November 2001 Expert witness for petitioners in Egale v. Canada (A.G.)Supreme Court of British Columbia: In the matter of Applications for Licences by Persons of the Same Sex who Intend to Marry; and in the matter of The Marriage Act and The Judicial Review Procedure Act (Vancouver Registry No. L001944; L002698; L003197), August 2001
- Linguistic Competence, Convention and Authority: Individualism and Anti-Individualism in Linguistics and Philosophy. PhD dissertation (Philosophy), UCLA University Archives, 1992
- On Rule Ordering Paradoxes in Morphology: A Semantic Alternative to the Level Ordering Hypothesis.MA thesis (Linguistics), UCLA University Archives, 1988
