= Canadian Journal of Philosophy =

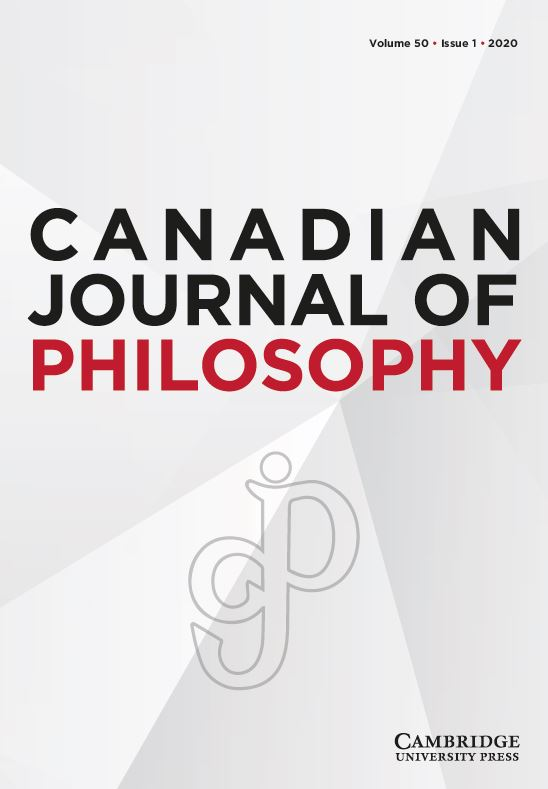
- Discipline: Philosophy
- Language: English
- Edited by: David Hunter

Publication details
- History: 1971–present
- Publisher: Cambridge University Press (Canada)
- Frequency: 8/year
- Open access: Hybrid

Standard abbreviations
- ISO 4: Can. J. Philos.

Indexing
- ISSN: 0045-5091 (print); 1911-0820 (web)
- OCLC no.: 1553152

Links
- Journal homepage

The Canadian Journal of Philosophy is a peer-reviewed academic journal of philosophy that was established in 1971 by John King-Farlow, Kai Nielsen, T.M. Penelhum, and W. W. Rozeboom. It is incorporated in Alberta, Canada as a non-profit corporation. As of January 2020 it is published by Cambridge University Press. Besides the regular issues, a supplementary volume is produced once per year consisting of invited papers on a particular philosophical topic.
