= Glen Pettigrove =

American philosopher

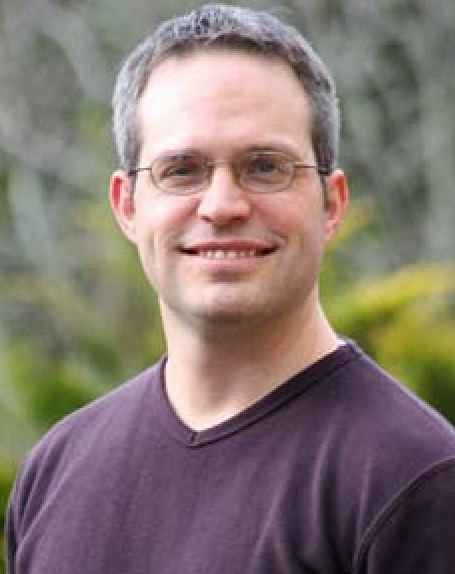
- Pettigrove in 2007
- Born: Glen Allan Pettigrove
- Awards: Marsden Grant

Education
- Education: University of California, Riverside (Ph.D.); Gordon-Conwell Theological Seminary (M.Div.); University of Michigan (AB)
- Thesis: Seeking Forgiveness: Studies in Moral and Political Philosophy (2003)
- Doctoral advisor: Georgia Warnke

Philosophical work
- Era: 21st-century philosophy
- Region: Western philosophy
- School: Virtue ethics
- Institutions: University of Glasgow
- Main interests: normative ethics, moral psychology, philosophy of emotions

Glen Allan Pettigrove is an American philosopher and Chair of Moral Philosophy at the University of Glasgow. He is known for his expertise on philosophy of emotions.

== Career ==
Pettigrove has taught at the University of Auckland (2008-2017), Massey University (2005-2008) and Santa Clara University (2003–2005).

== Books ==
- Forgiveness and Love, Oxford University Press, 2012, ISBN 9780199646555

== See also ==
- Philosophy of love
- Forgiveness
