= Vyacheslav Shestakov =

Russian philosopher

- Вячеслав Павлович Шестаков
- Born: 20 October 1935 (age 90); Haisyn, the USSR
- Citizenship: Russian
- Education: Moscow State University (1957)
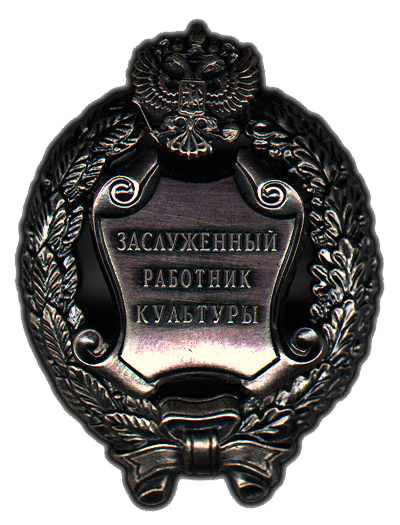
- Awards
- Scientific career
- Fields: philosophy, aesthetics, culturology, art history
- Workplaces: Russian Institute for Cultural Research
- Doctoral advisor: Valentin Asmus

Vyacheslav Pavlovich Shestakov (Russian: Вячесла́в Па́влович Шестако́в; born 1935) is a Russian philosopher who holds the title of Honoured Worker of Culture of the Russian Federation. During the period of 2004–2014 he headed the department of art theory at the Russian Institute for Cultural Research.

== Selected publications ==
in Russian

- Европейский эрос. Философия любви и европейское искусство. [Philosophy of love and European art] Moscow: ЛКИ, 2020 ISBN 978-5-382-01970-3
- Шестаков, В.П., ed. (1991). "Вступительная статья". Русский Эрос, или Философия любви в России [Russian Eros, or the Philosophy of Love in Russia] (in Russian). Progress Publishers. pp. 5–18. ISBN 5018002689.

in English

- Transformation of Eros. Philosophy of Love and European art. — Edwin Mellen Press, 1996.
