= Christine Tappolet =

Swiss philosopher

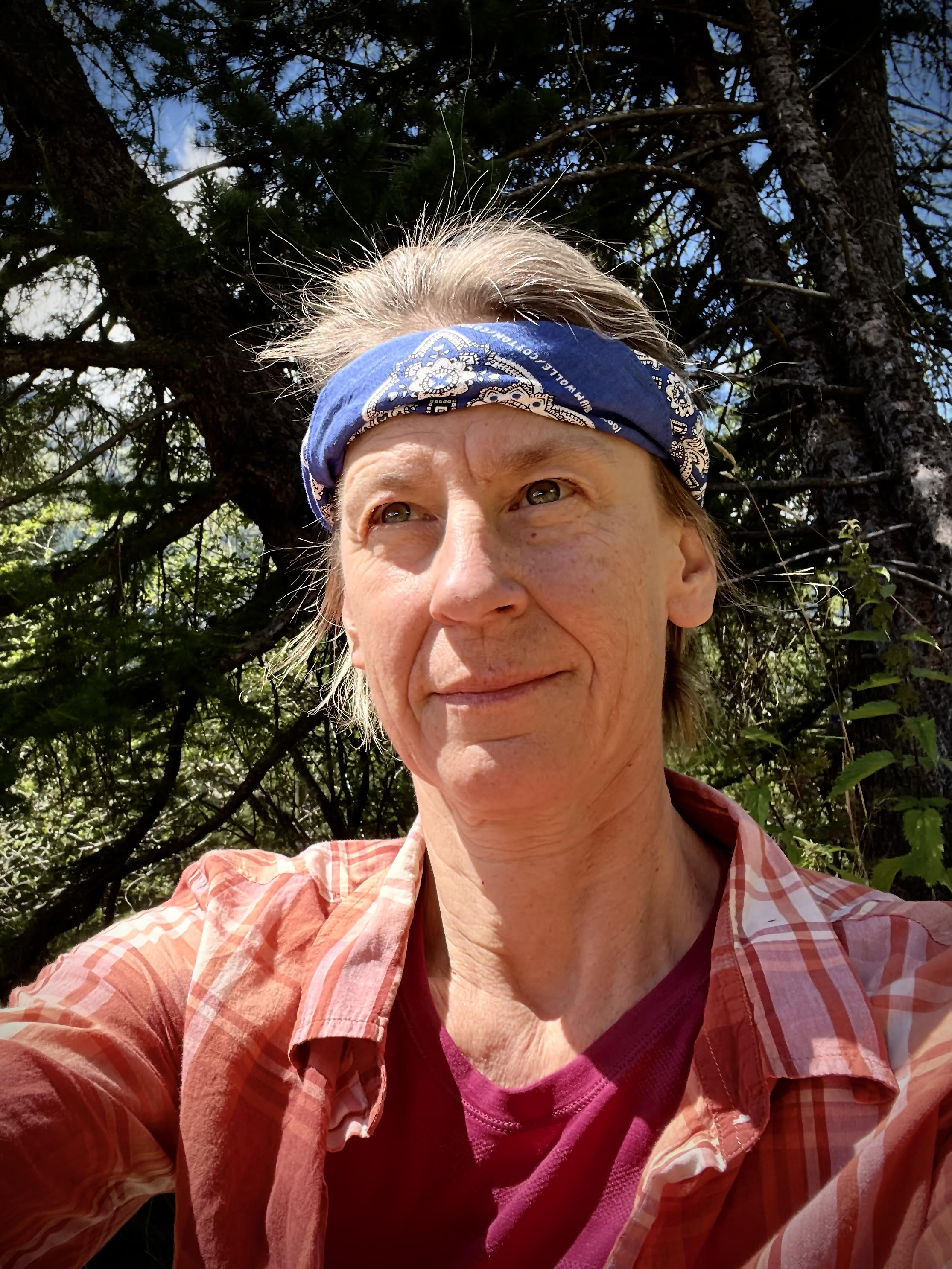
- Occupations: Philosopher; academic; author

Academic background
- Education: University of Geneva
- Doctoral advisor: Kevin Mulligan

Christine Tappolet is a Swiss philosopher, academic, and author. She is a Full Professor in the Department of Philosophy at the University of Montreal, and has authored and edited several books including, Emotions, Values, and Agency, and Philosophy of Emotion: A Contemporary Introduction.

Tappolet's research interests revolve around the field of ethics, with a particular focus on metaethics, moral psychology, and emotion theory. Her main research interest is the philosophy of emotion, including the role emotions play in values, beliefs, and actions.

Tappolet served as the President of the Société Analytique de Philosophie (SOPHA) from 2012 to 2015 and the Canadian Philosophical Association (CPA) from 2020 to 2022. She has recently been inducted as a fellow to the Royal Society of Canada.

== Education ==
Tappolet completed undergraduate studies at the University of Geneva, in Philosophy, German and English studies. She then graduated with an MA from King's College London in 1989, and subsequently earned an M.Phil. in 1992 at the University of London. She completed her Ph.D. at the University of Geneva under the supervision of Kevin Mulligan in 1996.

== Career ==
Tappolet started her academic career in 1997 as an assistant professor in the Department of Philosophy at the University of Montreal. She was promoted to associate professor in 2002, and subsequently to Full Professor in 2008. She also was the Canada Research Chair in Ethics and Metaethics at the University of Montreal between 2004 and 2013. She was invited as the Distinguished Visiting professor in the Centre for Moral and Political Philosophy at The Hebrew University of Jerusalem in 2019.

Between 2009 and 2021, Tappolet was steering an interuniversity research group on normativity, Le Groupe de Recherche Interuniversitaire sur la Normativité (GRIN). From 2012 until 2014, she directed an ethics research center, the Centre de Recherche en Éthique de l’Université de Montréal (CRÉUM). As its Founding Director she supervised this center's transformation into an interuniversity research cluster funded by the FRQ, the Centre de Recherche en Éthique (CRÉ), which she directed until 2021.

== Research ==
Tappolet has published close to 100 journal articles and book chapters. Her research interests include epistemology, philosophy of mind, philosophical ethics, especially metaethics and moral psychology, as well as, centrally, the philosophy of emotions and values.

=== The nature of emotions ===
While investigating emotions, Tappolet developed an account of emotions in terms of perceptual experiences. She argued that emotions have representational, evaluative content: they involve representations of their intentional objects as possessing evaluative features. When you admire an artist, for instance, you represent the artist as being admirable. Furthermore, according to her, such affective states are analog representations that have non-conceptual contents, that is, contents that are not conceptually articulated. Accordingly, there is no need to possess an evaluative concept such as admirableness to experience admiration. According to the so-called Perceptual Theory, emotions play a central role in human agency: emotions are closely connected to values, decision and action. With Mauro Rossi, she has argued that the Perceptual Account is better placed than the Attitudinal Theory developed by Julien Deonna and Fabrice Teroni to account for the relationship between emotions and values.

Relatedly, Tappolet has examined the common claim that emotion necessarily involve motivation. Focusing on the case of fear, she has argued that even an emotion like fear need not involve motivation. Accordingly, there are "contemplative emotions", such as fear directed at the past or at fictional entities. Incidentally, she also argued that fear need not concern one's own well-being. Pace Martha Nussbaum, we can for instance feel fear for perfect strangers.

Tappolet also researched the nature of negative emotions in general. In particular, she assessed the theoretical implications of the existence of negative emotions, holding that even if the many ways in which emotions can be negative makes for a difference with standard perceptual experiences, the Perceptual Theory is not threatened.

Nonetheless, Tappolet recently has argued that the Perceptual Theory should be replaced by a theory of emotions that better accounts for the differences between emotions and sensory perceptual experiences. This novel theory, called the "Receptive Theory", holds that emotions have to be modelled on analog representations of magnitudes, such as distance and number.

Overall, Tappolet's research aims at studying the varied aspects of emotions. Tappolet investigated the role of emotions in irrational actions, such as actions resulting from weakness of the will. She also examined the influence of emotions on beliefs, arguing that under some conditions, emotions could justify beliefs about evaluative features, such as danger or admirability. One of her central interest is the regulation and education of emotions. Early on, she argued that emotions exhibit plasticity in that individuals can to a large extent shape their emotional dispositions in the hope of experiencing more fitting emotions. In her recent 2022 work, she argued that art, such as music and literature, plays a central role in the regulation and education of emotions.

Together with Mauro Rossi, Tappolet examined the relation between emotions, psychological happiness, well-being, and virtue, proposing an argument to the effect that, assuming an Aristotelian account of virtues as involving emotional dispositions, being virtuous can contribute to one's well-being, though only when the external conditions are favorable. She and Rossi also discussed the objections against traditional happichness-based theory of well-being, proposing a new happiness-based theory. Psychological happiness, they argued, is characterized by a positive balance of affective states, i.e., emotions, moods, and sensory pleasures. Moreover, they argued that given that happiness is composed of states that have fittingness conditions, such as emotion, happiness itself may be assessed as fitting, or unfitting. Well-being can then be defined in terms of fitting happiness, that is, happiness that matches the circumstances the individual is in.

=== Metaethics, normative ethics and moral psychology ===
Tappolet has researched topics in philosophical ethics. In metaethics, she has focused on the nature of evaluative features, arguing for a Sentimentalist account according to which such features are essentially tied to affective responses. According to this account, it is a conceptual truth that something is admirable if and only if feeling admiration is appropriate in response to it. She has shown that this kind of Sentimentalism is compatible with Value Realism, that is, the thesis that evaluative features are objective properties of the world.

One question Tappolet has addressed is that of how to understand the notion of correctness or fittingness as it applies to emotions. According to her, even though emotions can be assessed in a great many ways, representational correctness, which is a central dimension of assessment, is what is at stake when wondering whether something has a particular evaluative feature, such as being admirable.

In normative ethics, Tappolet has argued for a pluralistic consequentialism, according to which one ought to promote a plurality of goods, including well-being, autonomy, and justice. She has also argued that virtues such as courage or kindness centrally involve emotional dispositions. Given this, moral education requires the education of emotion.

In moral psychology, Tappolet's work has focused on irrational actions, such as akrasia, weakness of the will, and procrastination. In particular, she looked into the connection between akrasia and self-control, arguing that akratic actions, i.e., drinking yet another glass of wine against one's better judgment, need not manifest lack of self-control, given that such action can be free and intentional.

While reviewing Tappolet's book Emotions, Values, and Agency, Benjamin De Mese noted that the book "is rich, accessibly written, well-structured, and extremely well-informed." He further noted that "her theory of emotion interlocks with plausible theories of value and agency, and these interlocking theories mutually support each other." According to Charlie Kurth, Haley Crosby, and Jack Basse's book review, Tappolet "provides a rich, provocative, and highly accessible defense of a perceptual theory of emotion." In his review, Michael Brady writes: "(…) her latest book will generate considerable interest from philosophers (…). Such interest will be handsomely repaid. Tappolet's latest illustration, defense, and application of her version of the Perceptual Theory (…) provide comfort to the model's supporters and pause for thought for its opponents. It is a model of clarity and rigor and evinces a deep understanding of emotions, values, reasons, responsibility, and agency."

== Bibliography ==
=== Books ===
- Émotions et Valeurs (2000)
- Co-edited with Sarah Stroud, Weakness of Will and Practical Irrationality (2003) ISBN 9780199257362
- Co-edited with Luc Faucher,The Modularity of Emotions (2007) ISBN 9780919491328
- With Ruwen Ogien, Les concepts de l'éthique: Faut-il être conséquentialiste (2009) ISBN 9782705668006
- Emotions, Values, and Agency (2016) ISBN 9780199696512
- Co-edited with Julien Deonna, Fabrice Teroni, and Anita Konzelmann Ziv, Shadows of the Soul: Philosophical Perspectives on Negative Emotions (2018) ISBN 9781138689695
- Philosophy of Emotion: A Contemporary Introduction (2022) ISBN 9781315542300

=== Selected articles and chapters ===
- Tappolet, C. (1997). Mixed inferences: a problem for pluralism about truth predicates. Analysis, 57(3), 209–210.
- Tappolet, C. (2000). Truth pluralism and many-valued logics: a reply to Beall. The Philosophical Quarterly, 50(200), 382–385.
- Tappolet, C. (2003). Emotions and the intelligibility of akratic action. In S. Stroud and C. Tappolet (eds.). Weakness of Will and Practical Irrationality. Oxford: Clarendon Press of Oxford University Press, 97–120.
- Tappolet, C. (2010). Emotion, motivation, and action: The case of fear. In P. Goldie (ed.) The Oxford handbook of philosophy of emotion, Oxford: Oxford University Press, 325–345.
- Tappolet, C. (2012). Emotions, perceptions, and emotional illusions. In C. Calabi (ed.) Perceptual illusions. Philosophical and psychological essays. London: Palgrave Macmillan, 205–222.
- Tappolet, C. (2016). Self-Control and Akrasia. In M. Griffith, N. Levy, and K. Timpe (eds.), Routledge Companion to Free Will. New York: Routledge, 565–576.
- Rossi, M., & Tappolet, C. (2019). What kind of evaluative states are emotions? The attitudinal theory vs. the perceptual theory of emotions. Canadian Journal of Philosophy, 49(4), 544–563.
- Tappolet, C. (2022). Sailing, Flow, and Happiness. In R. Casati (ed.), The Sailing mind, Cham: Springer, 17–29.
- Rossi, M., & Tappolet, C. (2023), Well-being as Fitting Happiness. In C. Howard and R. Rowland (eds.) Fittingness. Oxford: Oxford University Press, 267–289.
