= Dirk Baltzly =

Australian philosopher

- Born: 1963 (age 62–63)

Education
- Education: Ohio State University (PhD), Monash University (PhD)
- Thesis: Plato's Argument From Relatives: The Role of the Distinction Between Kath Hauto and Pros Ti in the Theory of Forms (1992)
- Doctoral advisor: Allan Silverman

Philosophical work
- Era: 21st-century philosophy
- Region: Western philosophy
- School: Ancient philosophy
- Institutions: University of Tasmania
- Main interests: virtue ethics
- Website: https://www.utas.edu.au/profiles/staff/humanities/dirk-baltzly

Dirk Christian Baltzly (born 1963) is an Australian philosopher and Professor of Philosophy at the University of Tasmania. He is known for his research on ancient Greek and Roman Philosophy. Baltzly is a Fellow of the Australian Academy of Humanities (2008).

== Books ==
- Baltzly D, Share M, Hermias: On Plato Phaedrus 227A-245E, Bloomsbury Academic, 2018, ISBN 9781350051904
- Baltzly DC, Finamore J, Miles G, Proclus: Commentary on Plato's 'Republic, Cambridge University Press, 2018 ISBN 9781316650899
- Tarrant H, Layne DA, Baltzly D, Renaud F (eds.), Brill's Companion to the Reception of Plato in Antiquity, Koninklijke Brill NV, 2018 ISBN 9789004270695
- Baltzly D, Proclus on Time and the Stars, Cambridge University Press, 2013 ISBN 9780521846585
- Baltzly D, Proclus: commentary on Plato's Timaeus, part II - Proclus on the world soul, Cambridge University Press, 2009, ISBN 9780521845960
- Baltzly Dirk, Proclus: Commentary on Plato's Timaeus, part III - Proclus on the World's Body, Cambridge University Press, 2007, ISBN 9780521845953
- Tarrant H, Baltzly Dirk (eds.), Reading Plato in Antiquity, Bloomsbury Publishing, 2006, ISBN 9780715634554
- Baltzly Dirk, Blyth D, Tarrant H (eds.), Power and Pleasure, Virtue and Vice: Essays in Ancient Moral Philosophy, University of Auckland, 2001
