= Irving Singer =

American philosopher

- Born: December 24, 1925; New York City, U.S.
- Died: February 1, 2015 (aged 89)

Philosophical work
- Era: Contemporary philosophy
- Region: Western philosophy
- Institutions: Harvard University, MIT
- Main interests: Aesthetics, philosophy of love, philosophy of film
- Website: www.mit.edu/~philos/singer.html

Irving Singer (December 24, 1925 – February 1, 2015) was an American professor of philosophy who was on the faculty of the Massachusetts Institute of Technology for 55 years and wrote over 20 books. He was the author of books on various topics, including cinema, love, sexuality, and the philosophy of George Santayana. He also wrote on the subject of film, including writings about the work of film directors Ingmar Bergman, Alfred Hitchcock.

== Biography ==
Singer was born in Brooklyn, New York City, on December 24, 1925; his parents were Isadore and Nettie Stromer Singer, Jewish immigrants from Austria-Hungary, who owned a grocery store in Coney Island.

Singer skipped three grades in school, graduating from Manhattan's Townsend Harris High School at age 15.

He entered the U.S. Army, serving in World War II, writing History of the 210th Field Artillery Group, which was published by the Army in 1945.

After studying for a short time at Brooklyn College before the war and attending Biarritz American University in Paris just after the war, Singer went to Harvard University on the G.I. Bill, was elected to Phi Beta Kappa, and graduated summa cum laude with an A.B. in 1948. He did his graduate studies at Oxford University and Harvard, receiving his PhD in philosophy from Harvard in 1952.

Singer taught briefly at Harvard, Cornell University, the University of Michigan, and Johns Hopkins University. He joined the Massachusetts Institute of Technology in 1958, first as a lecturer, but then promoted to associate professor in 1959, and full professor at 1967. Among the many subjects Singer taught at Massachusetts Institute of Technology were: Philosophy of Love in the Western World, Film as Visual and Literary Philosophy, and The Nature of Creativity.

He died in 2015, aged 89.

== Awards ==
- Four prize essays and other student awards, Harvard University
- ACLS Research Scholar, 1949–1950
- Post-doctoral Fulbright Research Scholar, 1955–1956
- Bollingen Grant-in-aid, 1958, 1959, 1965
- The Hudson Review Fellow in Criticism, 1958–1959
- Guggenheim Fellowship, 1965–1966
- ACLS Grant-in-aid, 1966
- Fellow of the Villa I Tatti, Harvard University Center for Italian Renaissance Studies, Florence, Italy, 1965–1967
- Bollingen Fellowship, 1966–1967
- Rockefeller Foundation Grant, 1970
- Balliol College/MIT Exchange, Oxford University, 1999
- Fellow, European Humanities Research Centre, Oxford University, 1999–2004

== Published works ==
- Santayana's Aesthetics: A Critical Analysis (1957) * The Goals of Human Sexuality (1973) ISBN 9780393010718
- Mozart and Beethoven: The Concept of Love in Their Operas (1977) ISBN 9780262513647
- The Nature of Love Volume 1: Plato to Luther (1984) ISBN 978-0262512725
- The Nature of Love Volume 2: Courtly and Romantic (1984) ISBN 9780262512732
- The Nature of Love Volume 3: The Modern World (1987) ISBN 978-0262512749
- Meaning in Life: The Creation of Value (1992, 1996) ISBN 9780262266482
- Meaning in Life Volume 2: The Pursuit of Love (1994) ISBN 9780801852404
- Meaning in Life Volume 3: The Harmony of Nature and Spirit (1996) ISBN 9780801860515
- Reality Transformed: Film as Meaning and Technique (1998) ISBN 978-0262692489
- George Santayana, Literary Philosopher (2000) ISBN 9780300128536
- Feeling and Imagination: The Vibrant Flux of Our Existence (2001)
- Explorations in Love and Sex (2001) ISBN 9780742512382 ISBN 978-0742512382
- Sex: A Philosophical Primer (2001, expanded edition: 2004) ISBN 978-0742512368
- Three Philosophical Filmmakers: Hitchcock, Welles, Renoir (2004) ISBN 978-0262693288
- Ingmar Bergman, Cinematic Philosopher: Reflections on his Creativity (2007) ISBN 978-0262513234
- Cinematic Mythmaking: Philosophy in Film (2008) ISBN 978-0262515153
- Philosophy of Love: A Partial Summing-Up (2009) ISBN 978-0262516174
- Modes of Creativity: Philosophical Perspectives (2011) ISBN 978-0262518758

== Sources ==
- The Nature and Pursuit of Love: The Philosophy of Irving Singer (Prometheus Books, 1995) — based on academic papers presented at a three-day conference about Singer at Brock University in 1991 ISBN 978-0879759124
