= Dialogue: Canadian Philosophical Review =

- Discipline: Philosophy
- Language: English; French
- Edited by: Nancy Salay

Publication details
- History: 1962–present
- Publisher: Cambridge University Press
- Frequency: Quarterly

Standard abbreviations
- ISO 4: Dialogue

Indexing
- ISSN: 0012-2173 (print); 1759-0949 (web)

Links
- Journal homepage

Dialogue: Canadian Philosophical Review (French: Revue canadienne de philosophie) is a peer-reviewed philosophical journal, publishing articles and book reviews in English and French, edited by Nancy Salay. It is the official journal of the Canadian Philosophical Association and is rated "B" (the second highest category) in the European Reference Index in the Humanities (ERIH).
