= Ronald de Sousa =

Canadian philosopher and academic (born 1940)

- Born: 1940 (age 85–86); Switzerland

Education
- Education: Princeton University (PhD, 1966)
- Thesis: Categories, Translation, and Linguistic Theory (1966)
- Doctoral advisor: Paul Benacerraf

Philosophical work
- Era: Contemporary philosophy
- Region: Western philosophy
- School: Analytic philosophy
- Institutions: University of Toronto
- Main interests: Philosophy of emotions

Ronald Bon de Sousa Pernes (/də ˈsuːzə/ də SOO-zə; born 1940) is a Swiss-born Canadian philosopher and academic. He is an emeritus professor at the Department of Philosophy of the University of Toronto, which he joined in 1966.

== Biography ==
De Sousa possesses both British and Canadian citizenship. Educated in Switzerland and England, he took his B.A. at New College, Oxford University, in 1962, and his Ph.D. at Princeton University in 1966. His thesis, Categories, Translation, and Linguistic Theory, was supervised by Paul Benacerraf.

He is best known for his work in the philosophy of emotions, and he has made contributions to the philosophy of mind and philosophy of biology. He was elected a fellow of the Royal Society of Canada in 2005.

== Books ==
- The Rationality of Emotion (1987) ISBN 0-262-54057-6
- Évolution et Rationalité (2004) ISBN 978-2-13-053530-0
- Why think? Evolution and the Rational Mind (2007) ISBN 978-0-19-518985-8
- Emotional Truth (2011) ISBN 9780195181548
- Love: A Very Short Introduction (2015) ISBN 978-0-19-966384-2
