= Philosophy of love =

Branch of philosophy

Philosophy of love is the field of social philosophy and ethics that attempts to describe the nature of love. It is a branch of humanities that allows us to understand and study the complex structure of compassion by the use of philosophical foundations.

== Current theories ==
There are many different theories that attempt to explain what love is, and what function it serves. Among the prevailing types of theories that attempt to account for the existence of love there are: psychological theories, evolutionary theories, and spiritual theories. Philosophers of love attempt to address several issues. For example, philosophers wrestle with whether love is based on qualities, which means love changes if that quality changes, or some other inherent value. Another common problem is whether love for another compromises one's distinct autonomy, since love involves taking on the interests of a partner. Feminist responses to this question raise the issue that one partner (often a woman) is more submissive and thus trapped.

== Western traditions ==
=== Classical roots ===
The roots of the classical philosophy of love go back to Plato's Symposium. Plato's Symposium digs deeper into the idea of love and bringing different interpretations and points of view in order to define love. Plato singles out three main threads of love that have continued to influence the philosophies of love that followed.

1. The idea of two loves, one heavenly, one earthly. As Uncle Toby was informed, over two millennia later, "of these loves, according to Ficinos' comment on Valesius, the one is rational - the other is natural - the first...excites to the desire of philosophy and truth - the second, excites to desire, simply".
2. Aristophanes' conception of mankind as the product of the splitting in two of an original whole: Freud would later draw on this myth - "everything about these primaeval men was double: they had four hands and four feet, two faces" - to support his theory of the repetition compulsion.
3. Plato's sublimation theory of love - "mounting upwards...from one to two, and from two to all fair forms, and from fair forms to fair actions, and from fair actions to fair notions, until from fair notions he arrives at the notion of absolute beauty".

Aristotle by contrast placed more emphasis on philia (friendship, affection) than on eros (love); and the relationship of friendship and love would continue to be played out into and through the Renaissance, with Cicero for the Latins pointing out that "it is love (amor) from which the word 'friendship' (amicitia) is derived" Meanwhile, Lucretius, building on the work of Epicurus, had both praised the role of Venus as "the guiding power of the universe", and criticized those who became "love-sick...life's best years squandered in sloth and debauchery".

Eros in Greek, also known as Cupid, was the mischievous god of love. He was a companion of the goddess Aphrodite. Eros was known for sparking the flame of love in gods and men. He is known for being portrayed as being armed with a bow and arrows or a flaming torch. He is also known for being disobedient but a loyal child of Aphrodite.

Philia love is the type of friendship love. In Greek, this translated to brotherly love. Aristotle was able to describe three main types of friendships. These are Useful, Pleasurable, and Virtue. Useful is when a friendship has a benefit to it which is derived by desire. Pleasurable is based on pleasure that one receives. Virtue is when it is based on true friendship and not receiving anything from it.

Agape in Greek simply means love. The presence of agape love is when there is goodwill, benevolence, and willful delight in the object of love. This type of love does not relate to that of romantic nor sexual love. Nor does it refer to Philia type of love where it is a close friendship or brotherly love. What sets this love apart is how it involves the natural actions of spirituality, such as through religiously-guided generosity and compassion to all.

=== Petrarchism ===
Among his love-sick targets, Catullus, along with others like Héloïse, would find himself summoned in the 12C to a Love's Assize. From the ranks of such figures would emerge the concept of courtly love, and from that Petrarchism would form the rhetorical/philosophical foundations of romantic love for the early modern world.

=== French skepticism ===
A more skeptical French tradition can be traced from Stendhal onwards. Stendhal's theory of crystallization implied an imaginative readiness for love, which only needed a single trigger for the object to be imbued with every fantasized perfection. Proust went further, singling out absence, inaccessibility or jealousy as the necessary precipitants of love. Lacan would almost parody the tradition with his saying that "love is giving something you haven't got to someone who doesn't exist". A post-Lacanian like Luce Irigaray would then struggle to find room for love in a world that will "reduce the other to the same...emphasizing eroticism to the detriment of love, under the cover of sexual liberation".

=== Western philosophers of love ===
- Hesiod
- Sappho
- Empedocles
- Plato (Symposium)
- St Augustine
- Thomas Aquinas
- Héloïse
- Leon Hebreo
- Baruch Spinoza
- Nicolas Malebranche
- Hegel
- Jean-Pierre Rousselot
- Antonio Caso Andrade
- Sigmund Freud
- Søren Kierkegaard - Works of Love
- Carl Jung
- Anders Nygren
- Martin D'Arcy
- Irving Singer - Philosophy of Love: A Partial Summing-Up
- Arthur Schopenhauer - "Metaphysics of Love"
- Thomas Jay Oord
- Friedrich Nietzsche
- Max Stirner "Egoistic Love"
- Max Scheler "The Nature of Sympathy"
- Erich Fromm, author of The Art of Loving
- C. S. Lewis, "The Four Loves"
- Michel Onfray, author of Théorie du corps amoureux : pour une érotique solaire (2000)
- Karl Popper
- Jean-Paul Sartre
- Jean-Luc Marion, "The Erotic Phenomenon"
- Luce Irigaray, "The Way of Love"
- bell hooks - All About Love: New Visions
- Roger Scruton - Notes from Underground
- Carrie Ichikawa Jenkins
- Robert Nozick - The Examined Life
- Bennett Helm
- Neil Delaney
- J. David Velleman - "Love as a Moral Emotion"
- Alan Soble

== Eastern traditions ==
- Given what Max Weber called the intimate relationship between religion and sexuality, the role of the lingam and yoni in India, or of yin and yang in China, as a structuring form of cosmic polarity based on the male and female principles, is perhaps more comprehensible. By way of maithuna or sacred intercourse, Tantra developed a whole tradition of sacred sexuality, which led in its merger with Buddhism to a view of sexual love as a path to enlightenment: as Saraha put it, "That blissful delight that consists between lotus and vajra...removes all defilements".
- More soberly, the Hindu tradition of friendship as the basis for love in marriage can be traced back to the early times of the Vedas.
- Confucius is sometimes seen as articulating a philosophy (as opposed to religion) of love.

Love in Hinduism

Love in Hinduism is referred to as devotional love, or love for a divine purpose. Swami Vivekananda, a Hindu monk and philosopher said, "All things in the universe are of divine origin and deserve to be loved; it has, however, to be borne in mind that the love of the whole includes the love of the parts."

Love in Buddhism

In Buddhism love is meant to be universal, to reach enlightenment, love must be for all humankind. The Dhammapada instructs "pluck out your self-love as you would pull off a faded lotus in autumn. Strive on the path of peace, the path of NIRVANA shown by Buddha."

Love in Confucianism

Love in Confucianism places importance on love in human affairs. Ren is a virtue of Confucianism meaning benevolent love that is central to their teachings, and focuses on different social relationships. In Book IV of The Analects of Confucius it says,

"4.1 The Master said, to settle in ren is the fairest course. If one chooses not to dwell amidst ren, whence will come knowledge?

4.7 The Master said, people make error according to the type of person they are. By observing their errors, you can understand ren."

== See also ==
- Attachment theory
- Agape
- Diotima of Mantinea
- Eroticism
- Free love
- Intimate relationship
- Love Is...
- Roman de la Rose
- Sexual relationship
