= Alan Soble =

American philosopher and author (1947–2025)

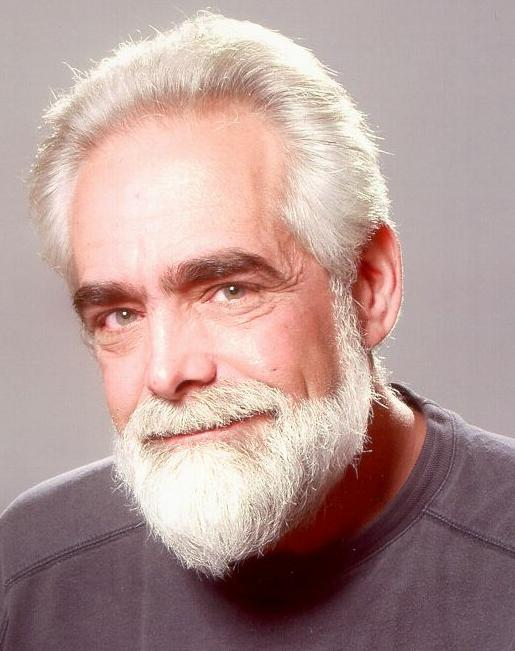
- Born: Alan Gerald Soble; March 4, 1947; Philadelphia, Pennsylvania, US
- Died: March 5, 2025 (aged 78); Philadelphia, Pennsylvania, US

Education
- Education: Albright College; University of Buffalo
- Thesis: Legal Paternalism (1976)

Philosophical work
- Institutions: University of New Orleans
- Main interests: Philosophy of sex

Alan Gerald Soble (/ˈsoʊbəl/; March 4, 1947 – March 5, 2025) was an American philosopher and author of several books on the philosophy of sex. He taught at the University of New Orleans from 1986 to 2006. He was also an Adjunct Professor of philosophy at Drexel University in Philadelphia.

== Life ==
Soble was born in 1947 to William and Sylvia Soble in Philadelphia, Pennsylvania. Early in his professional career, Soble wrote papers in areas of Ethics and Epistemology. In the late 1970s he began to help articulate the fledgling specialty of the philosophy of sex, becoming one of the founding scholars and leaders of the field. In 1977, while at the University of Texas in Austin, he also founded the Society for the Philosophy of Sex and Love, serving as the society's director from 1977 to 1992; the proceedings of the Society were published in 1997 as Sex, Love, and Friendship with Soble as editor.

In subsequent years, Soble edited or wrote many works in this field. In late 2005 he completed the central reference work in the philosophy of sex, Sex from Plato to Paglia.

Alan Soble was Research Professor at the University of New Orleans from 1986 to 2006.

Soble died on March 5, 2025 at his home in Philadelphia, PA.

== Selected publications ==
- Philosophy of Sex: contemporary readings, 6th edition. Rowman and Littlefield. 2012. ISBN 978-1-4422-1671-6.
- Soble, Alan (2008). The Philosophy of Sex and Love: An Introduction, 2nd edition, revised and expanded. Paragon House. ISBN 978-1-55778-875-7.
- Soble, Alan (2006). Sex from Plato to Paglia: A Philosophical Encyclopedia, (editor), 2 volumes. Greenwood Press. ISBN 0-313-32686-X.
- Soble, Alan (2002). Pornography, Sex, and Feminism. Prometheus Books. ISBN 1-57392-944-1.
- Soble, Alan (1996). Sexual Investigations. New York University Press. ISBN 0-8147-8085-7.
- Soble, Alan (1990). The Structure of Love. Yale University Press. ISBN 0-300-04566-2.
- Soble, Alan (1986). Pornography: Marxism, Feminism and the Future of Sexuality. Yale University Press. ISBN 0-300-03524-1.

== See also ==
- American philosophy
- Roger Scruton
- Sexual ethics
