= UCL Department of Philosophy =

Academic division of University College London, England

Coordinates: 51.52425°N 0.13184°W

Department of Philosophy, University College London
- Parent institution: University College London Faculty of Arts and Humanities
- Head of Department: Daniel Rothschild
- Website: Department of Philosophy

The Department of Philosophy is an academic division in the Faculty of Arts and Humanities at University College London.

== Affiliated centres ==
- The Keeling Centre for Ancient Philosophy (named after Stanley Victor Keeling)
- Watling Archive (archive of John Leonard Watling's published and unpublished writings)

== Rankings ==
The Philosophical Gourmet Report 2024–25 lists the department at 5th in the UK and 30th in the English-speaking world.

QS World University Rankings places the department at 7th in the UK and 22nd globally in 2025.

== Permanent Faculty ==
- Simona Aimar
- Nilanjan Das
- Luke Fenton-Glynn
- Sebastian Gardner
- Amanda Greene
- Ulrike Heuer
- Joe Horton (Head of Department)
- John Hyman (Grote Professor of the Philosophy of Mind and Logic)
- Mark Eli Kalderon
- Douglas Lavin
- Fiona Leigh
- Rory Madden
- Véronique Munoz-Dardé
- Lucy O'Brien
- Lavinia Picollo
- Sarah Richmond
- Daniel Rothschild
- Robert Simpson
- Tom Stern
- Han van Wietmarschen
- James Wilson
- José Zalabardo

== Honorary Faculty ==
- Tamsin De Waal
- M.M. McCabe
- Anthony Savile
- Victor Verdejo
- Jonathan Wolff
- Arnold Zuboff

== Emeritus Professors ==
- Malcolm Budd
- Marcus Giaquinto
- Ted Honderich
- Paul Snowdon

== Notable alumni ==
- Keith Simmons
- David Conway
- James Garvey
- Momtazuddin Ahmed
- Marjorie Wallace
- Ricky Gervais
- Peter Warlock
- Jonathan Dimbleby

== See also ==
- Department of Philosophy, King's College London
