= Richard Wollheim =

British philosopher (1923–2003)

Richard Wollheim FBA
- Wollheim in 1969
- Born: Richard Arthur Wollheim; May 5, 1923; London, England
- Died: November 4, 2003 (aged 80); London, England
- Education: Balliol College, Oxford
- Occupation: Philosopher
- Known for: Philosophy of art, interpretation of psychoanalytic theory
- Notable work: Art and its Objects (1968); Freud (1971); Painting as an Art (1987)
- Spouse(s): Anne Barbara Denise Toynbee (married 1950–1967); Mary Day Lanier (married 1969)
- Children: 3

Richard Arthur Wollheim FBA (5 May 1923 − 4 November 2003) was a British philosopher noted for original work on mind and emotions, especially as related to the visual arts, specifically, painting. Wollheim served as the president of the British Society of Aesthetics from 1992 onwards until his death in 2003.

== Biography ==
Richard Wollheim was the son of Eric Wollheim, a theatre impresario, and Constance (Connie) Mary Baker, an actress who used the stage name Constance Luttrell. (Note: His posthumously published Germs: A Memoir of Childhood (2004) discloses a good deal about his family background and his life up to early manhood. An 'extract published the same year also speaks to his childhood.) He attended Westminster School, London, and Balliol College, Oxford (1941–2, 1945–8), interrupted by active military service in World War II for which he volunteered. (Note: For his own account of his service in Europe during the war, see Wollheim, "Fifty Years On", London Review of Books (23 June 1994)) He obtained two first class BA degrees, one in History in 1946, the other in Philosophy, Politics and Economics in 1948. The same year, he began teaching at University College London, where he became Grote Professor of Mind and Logic and Department Head from 1963 to 1982.

He retired from that position to take up a professorship at Columbia University (1982–85). He then taught at the University of California at Berkeley (1985–2002). He chaired the Department at UC Berkeley, 1998–2002. Between 1989 and 1996 he split his time between Berkeley and the University of California, Davis, where he was Professor of Philosophy and the Humanities. Additionally, he held visiting positions at Harvard University, the University of Minnesota, Graduate Center, CUNY and elsewhere.

He was elected as a fellow of the British Academy in 1972 and of the American Academy of Arts and Sciences in 1986.

Wollheim gave several distinguished lecture series. He delivered the William James Lectures at Harvard in 1982, published as The Thread of Life (1984) and the Ernst Cassirer Lectures at Yale in 1991, upon which were based his On the Emotions (1999). He also gave the Andrew W. Mellon lectures in Fine Arts at the National Gallery of Art in 1984 which, with much elaboration, became his Painting as an Art (1987).

In 1962, Wollheim published an article "A paradox in the theory of democracy", in which he argued that a supporter of democracy faces a contradiction when he votes. On the one hand he wants a particular party or candidate to win, but on the other hand he wants whoever wins the most votes to win. This has become known as Wollheim's paradox.

His Art and its Objects (1968) had a significant impact upon both aesthetics and the philosophy of art.

In a 1965 essay, 'Minimal Art', he coined the term Minimalism.

As well as for his work on the philosophy of art, Wollheim was known for his philosophical treatments of depth psychology, especially that of Sigmund Freud, to whose work he had been introduced by his father.

Wollheim was an honorary affiliate of the British Psychoanalytical Society, to whom he gave an Ernest Jones lecture in 1968 (Note: Published as "The mind and the mind's image of itself" in The International Journal of Psychoanalysis Vol. 50, (Jan 1, 1969) and reprinted in On Art and the Mind (1972).) and in 1991 he was given an award for his services to psychoanalysis by the International Psychoanalytical Association.

== Personal life ==
Wollheim married Anne Barbara Denise (1920–2004), daughter of Lieutenant-Colonel George Powell, of the Grenadier Guards, after her divorce from her first husband, the literary critic Philip Toynbee. They had twin sons, Bruno and Rupert. Their marriage was dissolved in 1967. Wollheim married Mary Day Lanier, stepdaughter of Dwight Macdonald, in 1969; their daughter is Emilia.

== Publications ==
For an extensive bibliography of Richard Wollheim's publications by a professional bibliographer, see Eddie Yeghiayan's UC-Irvine site. See also the 'Philweb' listing.

Many of Richard Wollheim's writings are in non-academic publications. Besides books, he published many articles in journals, edited collections, book reviews, and gallery catalogues for art exhibitions. He also left writings in manuscript, letters, and recordings of his talks.

=== Books and monographs (selected) ===
- F. H. Bradley. Harmondsworth; Baltimore: Penguin, 1959. 2d edition, 1969.
- 'Socialism and Culture'. (Fabian Tract, 331.) London: Fabian Society, 1961.
- 'On Drawing an Object'.: (An inaugural lecture delivered at University College London 1 December 1964) London: University College, 1965. Repr. in On Art and the Mind.
- Art and Its Objects: an Introduction to Aesthetics. New York: Harper & Row, 1968. Harmondsworth: Penguin Books, 1970. As Harper Torchbook, 1971. (Note: "an expanded version of an essay originally written for the Harper Guide to Philosophy, edited by Arthur Danto")
  - Art and its Objects: With Six Supplementary Essays. 2d edition. Cambridge, New York: Cambridge University Press, 1980.
- A Family Romance. London: Jonathan Cape, 1969. New York: Farrar, Straus, Giroux, 1969 (novel).
- Freud. (Fontana Modern Masters.) London: Collins, 1971. Paperback, 1973. American and later Cambridge University Press (1981) eds. titled Sigmund Freud.
- On Art and the Mind: essays and lectures. Cambridge, Massachusetts: Harvard University Press,1972.
- 'The Good Self and the Bad Self: the Moral Psychology of British Idealism and the English School of Psychoanalysis Compared' Dawes Hicks Lecture (1975) (Note: Published both within Proceedings of the British Academy 61, 1975 and as a separate monograph in 1976.)—repr. in The Mind and Its Depths, 1993.
- 'The Sheep and the Ceremony' The Leslie Stephen Lecture, 1979 —repr. in The Mind and Its Depths, 1993.
- The Thread of Life. Cambridge, Massachusetts: Harvard University Press, 1984.
- Painting as an Art. Andrew M. Mellon Lectures in Fine Arts, National Gallery of Art, Washington, D.C. Cambridge, Massachusetts: Harvard University Press, 1987.
- The Mind and Its Depths. Cambridge, Massachusetts: Harvard University Press, 1993 (essays).
- On the Emotions. New Haven and London: Yale University Press, 1999.
- Germs: a memoir of childhood. London: Waywiser Press. 2004.
- Gary Kemp and Elisabetta Toreno (eds.) Uncollected Writings: Writing on Art, Oxford, 2025 doi:10.1093/9780191995767.001.0001
- Jonathan Wolff (ed.) Uncollected Writings: Writing on Political Philosophy, Oxford, 2025 doi:10.1093/9780198927600.001.0001

=== Edited books ===
- Hume on Religion London: Collins, Fontana Library, 1968
- The Image in Form: Selected Writings of Adrian Stokes, 1974
- Freud: A Collection of Critical Essays (1974), reprinted as Philosophers on Freud: New Evaluations (1977)
  - includes Wollheim's "Introduction" and "Imagination and Identification"
- Philosophical Essays on Freud, with James Hopkins. Cambridge: Cambridge University Press, 1982.
  - includes Wollheim's "The bodily ego".
- R.B.Kitaj: A Retrospective, with Richard Morphet. London: Tate Publishing, 1994.
  - includes Wollheim's "Kitaj: Recollections and Reflections"

=== Selected articles ===
- "`Monstrous Orthodoxy." Review of H. B. Acton's The Illusion of the Epoch: Marxism-Leninism as a Philosophical Creed,. New Statesman and Nation (April 16, 1955), 49(1258): 548, 550.
- "Heterosexual Duties." Review of C. H. Rolph, ed. Does Pornography Matter? New Statesman (November 3, 1961), 62(1599): 656, 658.
- "Crime, Sin, and Mr. Justice Devlin", Encounter, vol. 13, no. 5 (November 1959), pp. 34–40.
- "Minimal Art", Arts Magazine (January 1965): 26–32. Repr. in Minimal art: a critical anthology (1968) and On Art and the Mind.
- "On the Theory of Democracy" in Bernard Williams and Alan Montefiore (eds.), British Analytical Philosophy (London/New York: Routledge & Kegan Paul; Humanities Press, 1966), pp. 247–66
- "Nelson Goodman's Languages of Art", The Journal of Philosophy: 62, no. 16 (Ag. 1970): 531. JSTOR 2024577
- "Philosophy and the Arts" (Conversation with Richard Wollheim).In Bryan Magee, ed., Modern British Philosophy, 1971.
- "Adrian Stokes, critic, painter, poet", Times Literary Supplement (17 February 1978): 207–209.
- "The Artistic Temperament" (review of Michael Levey's The Case of Walter Pater (1978), The Times Literary Supplement (22 September 1978): 1045
- "Art as a Form of Life." In Ted Honderich and Myles Burnyeat, eds., Philosophy As It Is, 1979
- “Pictorial Style: Two Views.” In The Concept of Style, edited by Berel Lang, 129-148, 1979.
- "The Cabinet of Dr Lacan", Topoi: 10 no. 2 (1991): 163–174. doi:10.1007/BF00141337
- "A Bed out of Leaves", London Review of Books 25, no. 23 (4 December 2003).

== Sources ==
- Budd, Malcolm (2005). "Richard Arthur Wollheim, 1923–2003" (PDF). Proceedings of the British Academy. 130: 227–246.
