= John Hyman =

John Hyman may refer to:

- John Adams Hyman (1840–1891), a Republican congressman in the U.S.
- John Wigginton Hyman (1899–1977), American jazz cornet player, better known as Johnny Wiggs
- John Hyman (philosopher) (born 1960), British philosopher
