= James Sully =

English psychologist (1842–1923)

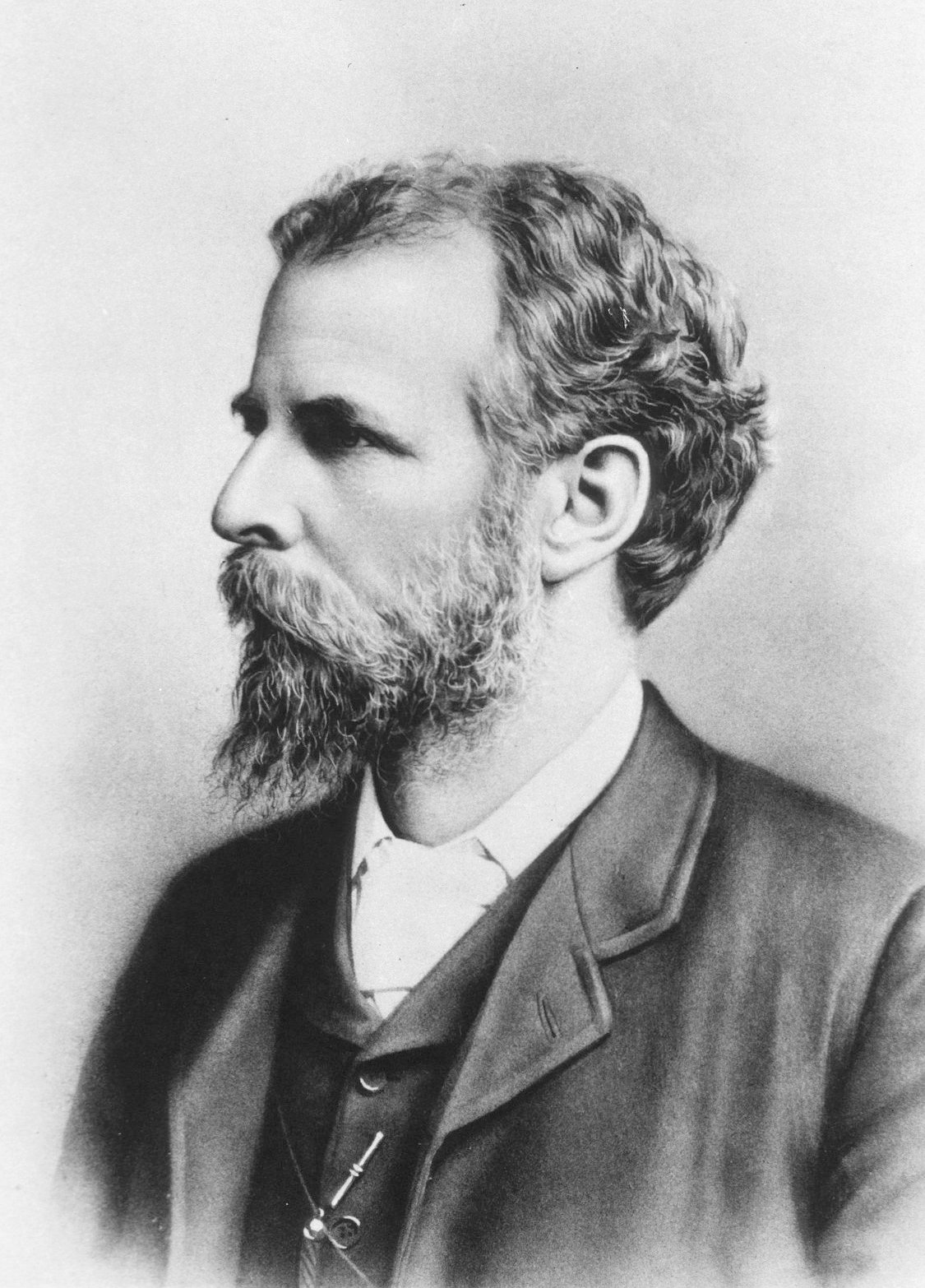
- Sully c. 1880
- Born: 3 March 1842; Bridgwater, Somerset, England
- Died: 1 November 1923 (aged 81); Richmond, Surrey, England
- Education: Regent's Park College; University of Göttingen; Humboldt University of Berlin
- Scientific career
- Fields: Psychology, philosophy
- Workplaces: Baptist College, Pontypool; University College London

James Sully (3 March 1842 – 1 November 1923) was an English psychologist, philosopher and writer.

== Biography ==
James Sully was born at Bridgwater, Somerset, the son of J. W. Sully, a liberal Baptist merchant and ship-owner. He was educated at the Independent College in Taunton, Regent's Park College, at the University of Göttingen, where he studied under Hermann Lotze, and at the Humboldt University of Berlin, where he studied under Emil du Bois-Reymond and Hermann von Helmholtz.

Sully was originally destined for the nonconformist ministry and in 1869 became classical tutor at the Baptist College, Pontypool. In 1871, however, he adopted a literary and philosophic career. Between 1892 and 1903, he was Grote Professor of the Philosophy of Mind and Logic at University College London, where he was succeeded by Carveth Read.

An adherent of the associationist school of psychology, his views had great affinity with those of Alexander Bain. Sully wrote monographs on subjects such as pessimism, and psychology textbooks, some of the first in English, including The Human Mind (1892). His 1881 Illusions was commended by both Freud and Wundt.

Sully opened an experimental psychology laboratory at University College London in January 1898 and in 1901 was a founding member of the British Psychological Society.

Sully died in Richmond, Surrey on 1 November 1923.

== Works ==
=== Books ===
- Sensation and Intuition (1874)
- Pessimism (1877)
- Illusions (1881; 4th ed., 1895)
- Outlines of Psychology (1884; many editions)
- Teacher's Handbook of Psychology (1886)
- Studies of Childhood (1895)
- Children's Ways (1897)
- An Essay on Laughter (1902)
- Italian Travel Sketches (1912)
- My Life and Friends (1918)

=== Selected articles ===
- "The Æsthetics of Human Character", in: The Fortnightly Review, Vol. XV, 1871.
- "Aesthetics", in: Encyclopædia Britannica, 9th edition, 1875–1889; republished online at 1902encyclopedia.com. Retrieved 17 April 2017.
