= Daniel Rothschild (philosopher) =

American philosopher (born 1979)

- Born: Daniel Henry Rothschild; 1979 (age 46–47)
- Awards: Arts and Humanities Research Council fellowship Deforest Senior Prize in Mathematics

Education
- Education: Yale University (B.A.); Princeton University (Ph.D.)
- Thesis: Semantic Interactions: Descriptions and their Neighbors (2006)
- Doctoral advisor: Gilbert Harman; James Pryor
- Other advisor: Delia Graff Fara

Philosophical work
- Era: Contemporary philosophy
- Region: Western philosophy
- School: Analytic
- Institutions: University College London
- Main interests: Philosophy of language

Daniel Henry Rothschild (born 1979) is an American philosopher and Professor of Philosophy of Language at University College London Department of Philosophy. He is known for his expertise on philosophy of language. Rothschild has held various fellowships from the Arts and Humanities Research Council and is a Fifty-Pound fellow of All Souls College.
