= Wollheim's paradox =

Problem in political philosophy

Wollheim's paradox is a problem in political philosophy that points to an inherent contradiction in the concept of democracy. The paradox highlights the fact that a person can simultaneously advocate two conflicting policy options A and B, provided that the person believes that democratic decisions should be followed. The paradox was formulated by the British philosopher Richard Wollheim in 1962 in an article entitled "A paradox in the theory of democracy".

== Summary ==
In his article, Wollheim describes a machine that compiles the votes of voters in such a way that the result invariably is the most democratic outcome. He also assumes that a voting person has preferences that enable them to prefer policy proposal A to B, and that the proposals are mutually exclusive. The person believes that Proposal A should be realized, and moreover that he should vote on the proposals he believes should be implemented. So he gives his vote to option A in the machine. Once the machine has tallied all votes, proposal B has received more votes than option A. Since the person is democratically minded, he believes now that the proposal that the democratic process has chosen should be realized, in this case B. So the person believes that both proposals A and B should be implemented, which is a contradiction.

== Analysis ==
Wollheim presents in his essay two ways to resolve the paradox, which he rejects.

The first strategy is based on the idea that the person does not really prefer A, but his preference should really be formulated as "A, if the majority vote for it". Wollheim rejects this formulation because it is about what result the machine gives, and not about what the person himself thinks of the two proposals. There is no distinction between "A, if enough people vote as" and "B, if enough people vote so". These preferences are equivalent to "what result the machine gives" meaning that the person concerned gives its consent to the democratic machine itself. But the machine's function assumes that it can compile the voters' preferences on different policy options. The machine cannot work without voters having preferences, yet the voters prefer the result of the machine over their own preferences.

The other solution that Wollheim rejects is that the person doesn't really prefer B, but rather considers it wise or tactically smart to accept the machine's result. The preference for B is of a different type from the moral-based preference for A, which means that the paradox is dissolved. The problem with this solution is that, while perhaps some people accept the machine's result because they think it is wise or tactically smart to do so, there are probably at least a few people who believe that there are moral reasons to accept the democratic decision of the machine. For these people, the paradox remains, and must be solved in a different way.

Wollheim sketches an analysis in which the paradox may not arise. He postulates two principles of moral values, "direct" and "oblique":

"Direct principles to the morality of actions, policies, motives, etc., where these are picked out or designated by means of some general descriptive expressions, e.g., murder, envy, benevolence, birth control, telling lies, etc. Oblique principles, by contrast, refer to the morality of actions, policies, motives, etc., where these actions, policies, motives, etc., are not picked out by reference to some common quality of characteristic that they possess, but are identified by means of an artificial property bestowed on them either as the result of an act of will of some individual or in consequence of the corporate actions of some institution. Now, my suggestion is that two judgements of the form 'A ought to be the case' and 'B ought to be the case' are not incompatible even though A and B cannot be simultaneously realized if one of these judgements is asserted as a direct principle whereas the other is asserted as a derivation from an oblique principle-provided that the direct and oblique principle are not themselves incompatible".
