= Carveth Read =

British philosopher and logician (1848–1931)

Carveth Read (1848–1931) was a 19th- and 20th-century British philosopher and logician.

== Life ==
He was born 16 March 1848 in Falmouth, Cornwall, England. He was the third son of Edward Read and Elizabeth Truscott. He attended the University of Cambridge (Christ's College). He received a B.A. (Moral Sciences Tripos, 1st) in 1873 and an M.A. in 1877. He was the Hilbert travelling scholar, studying at Leipzig and Heidelberg Universities in 1874-1877. In 1877 he married Evelyn Thompson. From 1878 he lectured at Wren's 'Coaching' establishment (located at 7 Powis Square, Westbourne Park, London). He was Grote professor of philosophy of mind and logic at the University College London (UCL) from 1903 to 1911. From 1911 to 1921 he was Lecturer in Comparative Psychology at UCL. He died 6 December 1931 in Solihull, Warwickshire, England.

== Work ==
In the preface to the fourth edition of his book Logic: Deductive and Inductive (1920), he identifies his significant influences. He states, "the work may be considered, on the whole, as attached to the school of Mill; to whose System of Logic, and to Bain's Logic, it is deeply indebted. Amongst the works of living writers, the Empirical Logic of Venn and the Formal Logic of Keynes have given me most assistance."

In Chapter 22 of Logic (p 352), Read says: "Even in reasoning upon some subjects, it is a mistake to aim at an unattainable precision. It is better to be vaguely right than exactly wrong.", the original source of the much quoted aphorism "It is better to be roughly right than exactly wrong" that is often incorrectly attributed to John Maynard Keynes.

Carveth Read also wrote about human evolution. He was an early proponent of the hunting hypothesis — the idea that human intelligence evolved thanks to the emergence of an ape lineage that did more hunting than other apes.

== Bibliography ==
- On the Theory of Logic: An Essay (1878)
- Logic: Deductive and Inductive (1898 – first edition)
- The Metaphysics of Nature (1905 - first edition)
- Natural and Social Morals (1909)
- The Origin of Man and of His Superstitions (1920)
