= Gathering hypothesis =

The gathering hypothesis is a term in evolutionary psychology coined in 1970s feminism as the antithesis of "hunting hypothesis", suggesting that gathering rather than hunting was the main factor in the emergence of anatomically modern humans.

David Buss argues that tools were not used for hunting initially, but instead to dig up and gather plants. It is possible the invention of tools explains the transition from a forest habitat to the savanna woodlands and grasslands. Tools made gathering food easier and more economical enabling ancestral humans to live in a sparser environment. It was not until the invention of receptacles to store food that more elaborate tools used to hunt, skin, and butcher were developed. According to the gathering hypothesis hunting had no major role in the evolution of modern humans.

One of the sources of evidence for the gathering hypothesis is in the alleged “Superior Spatial Memory of Women.” McBurney et al. found that women perform better on memory tasks than males whereas men perform better on rotation tasks. Hawkes furthers the argument for the gathering hypothesis in that women obtain larger fitness benefits by tending to their offspring, thus they provision, because it is simpler to coordinate gathering and offspring care. The "Superior Spatial Memory of Women" has been supported through more recent studies by Neave et al. in which females were both quicker and made few mistakes in gathering and identifying specific plants than their male counterparts.

However, the gathering hypothesis cannot account for sexual division of labor in men hunting and women gathering, high parental investment of human males, male coalition psychology, why humans live in environments without plant resources, human gut structure versus primate gut structure, reciprocal alliances (alliance theory), and why women share food.

== See also ==
- Aquatic ape hypothesis
