= Arnold Zuboff =

American philosopher (born 1946)

- Born: Arnold Stuart Zuboff; January 2, 1946 (age 80)

Education
- Education: University of Connecticut (B.A., 1968); Princeton University (PhD, 2009)
- Thesis: Time, Self and Sleeping Beauty (2009)
- Doctoral advisor: Thomas Nagel

Philosophical work
- Era: Contemporary philosophy
- Region: Western philosophy
- School: Analytic philosophy
- Institutions: UCL Department of Philosophy
- Main interests: Personal identity; philosophy of mind; ethics; metaphysics; epistemology; philosophy of probability
- Notable works: Finding Myself: Beyond the False Boundaries of Personal Identity (2025)
- Notable ideas: Early examples of the Sleeping Beauty problem; Universalism (theory of personal identity)

Arnold Stuart Zuboff (born January 2, 1946) is an American philosopher who taught at the UCL Department of Philosophy from 1974 until his retirement in 2011. His work concerns personal identity, the philosophy of mind, ethics, metaphysics, epistemology, and the philosophy of probability.

Zuboff developed early examples related to the Sleeping Beauty problem, a philosophical puzzle concerning probability and self-locating belief. His short story "The Story of a Brain" (1981), published in The Mind's I, examines the relationship between neural activity and consciousness. He has also defended a theory of personal identity called "universalism", which holds that all conscious beings share a single subject of experience. He developed this position in "One Self: The Logic of Experience" (1990) and Finding Myself: Beyond the False Boundaries of Personal Identity (2025). His work in ethics includes an account of morality based on the desires people would have with a complete understanding of their circumstances and the consequences of their actions.

== Early life and education ==
Zuboff was born on January 2, 1946. He was raised in West Hartford, Connecticut.

Zuboff received a B.A. in philosophy from the University of Connecticut in 1968. He subsequently attended Princeton University Graduate School.

In 2009, Zuboff defended his doctoral dissertation, Time, Self and Sleeping Beauty, at Princeton under the supervision of Thomas Nagel. His examiners were Gilbert Harman, Adam Elga, John P. Burgess, Alexander Nehamas, and Nagel.

== Career ==
Zuboff lectured at the UCL Department of Philosophy from 1974 until his retirement in 2011. UCL lists him as an Honorary Senior Research Associate in its Department of Philosophy.

Zuboff was a close friend of the Canadian philosopher G. A. Cohen, with whom he discussed philosophy.

== Philosophy ==
=== Sleeping Beauty problem ===
Zuboff developed unpublished examples that preceded the familiar formulation of the Sleeping Beauty problem, a philosophical puzzle concerning probability and self-locating belief. In his 2000 paper introducing the problem, philosopher Adam Elga credited Robert Stalnaker with naming it and noted that Stalnaker had encountered similar examples in Zuboff's unpublished work.

Elga's formulation concerns a person who is put to sleep and subsequently awakened either once or twice, depending on the outcome of a fair coin toss. The person has no memory of any previous awakening and is asked, upon awakening, what probability they should assign to the coin having landed heads. The problem concerns how a person should assess probabilities when uncertain about their own temporal location.

Zuboff later addressed the problem in his doctoral dissertation, Time, Self and Sleeping Beauty (2009), and in Finding Myself: Beyond the False Boundaries of Personal Identity (2025), discussing it in connection with his theory of universalism.

=== Consciousness and the brain ===
In "The Story of a Brain" (1981), published in The Mind's I, an anthology edited by Douglas Hofstadter and Daniel Dennett, Zuboff presented a thought experiment about the relationship between neural activity and consciousness. The story concerns a person whose brain is preserved outside the body and artificially stimulated to produce conscious experiences. Scientists subsequently separate the brain into its hemispheres and then into progressively smaller components, eventually isolating individual neurons. They use artificial stimulation to reproduce the patterns of neural activity that would occur in the intact brain, even when its components are no longer connected.

Through this scenario, Zuboff questions whether reproducing patterns of neural activity is sufficient for conscious experience to occur independently of the physical arrangement, timing and causal relationships of neurons. The story also considers the consequences of this assumption for the reliability of beliefs about the physical world.

In 2022, neuroscientists Albert Gidon, Jaan Aru and Matthew Evan Larkum revisited Zuboff's thought experiment in PLOS Biology. They examined whether artificially replaying previously recorded neuronal activity could recreate a conscious experience, considering the implications of removing the causal connections between neuronal signals while preserving their patterns of activity.

=== Universalism ===
In "Moment Universals and Personal Identity" (1978), Zuboff argued that a particular moment of subjective experience need not belong exclusively to one organism, place or time. He questioned the assumption that experiences necessarily belong to distinct, continuing persons, proposing instead that subjectively identical experiences could be instances of the same experiential type.

Zuboff developed a theory of personal identity that he calls "universalism" in "One Self: The Logic of Experience" (1990). According to this view, the apparent separation between oneself and other conscious beings is an illusion arising from the limited perspective of individual experience. Zuboff argues that the first-person character of consciousness does not belong exclusively to any particular organism and that all conscious experiences have the same subject.

Zuboff uses thought experiments to examine conventional assumptions about personal identity. In one example, two unconscious individuals exchange the physical components of their bodies, one piece at a time, until each occupies the other's original body. He argues that no particular stage in this exchange establishes when one person becomes the other. He also considers split-brain consciousness, maintaining that the existence of separate, unconnected fields of awareness does not necessarily establish the existence of distinct subjects.

In "An Introduction to Universalism", Zuboff described the view as the claim that "all the experience in all the separate nervous systems of the world is yours", despite each experience appearing to constitute the entirety of one's consciousness. Psychologist Elizabeth R. Valentine described Zuboff as arriving, through philosophical rather than mystical arguments, at the conclusion that there is no fundamental division between selves.

Zuboff has also defended universalism through probabilistic arguments. He contrasts the apparent improbability of one's own existence, understood as depending on a particular sequence of biological events, with the universalist claim that one's existence requires only that some conscious experience occurs. He argues that the latter view avoids the apparent improbability of any particular individual having come into existence.

In 2025, Zuboff published Finding Myself: Beyond the False Boundaries of Personal Identity, a monograph further developing his theory. Published by the Philosophy Documentation Center as a supplement to Midwest Studies in Philosophy, the book includes a foreword by Thomas Nagel and was made available as an open-access publication under a Creative Commons licence.

=== Ethics ===
In "Morality as What One Really Desires" (1995), Zuboff presented an account of moral motivation based on the relationship between desires, beliefs and self-interest. He argued that desires depend on beliefs about their objects and can therefore be mistaken. A person who desires something because of an incorrect understanding of it, he maintained, does not genuinely desire that thing as it actually is.

Zuboff proposed that a person's genuine desires are those they would have with a complete understanding of all relevant circumstances and consequences. He argued that such an understanding would include the interests of others, providing reasons for moral action independently of personal sympathy, social approval or the threat of punishment. On this account, morality and genuine self-interest would not conflict, since both would reflect what a person would desire if fully informed.

== Publications ==
=== Books ===
- Finding Myself: Beyond the False Boundaries of Personal Identity (PDF). Charlottesville: Philosophy Documentation Center. 2025. ISBN 978-1-63435-117-1.

=== Articles ===
- Zuboff, Arnold (June 1978). "Moment Universals and Personal Identity" (PDF). Proceedings of the Aristotelian Society. 78 (1): 141–156. doi:10.1093/aristotelian/78.1.141.
- Zuboff, Arnold (March 1990). "One Self: The Logic of Experience" (PDF). Inquiry: An Interdisciplinary Journal of Philosophy. 33 (1): 39–68. doi:10.1080/00201749008602210.
- Zuboff, A. (July 1992). "A Presentation without an Example?" (PDF). Analysis. 52 (3): 190–191. doi:10.1093/analys/52.3.190.
- Zuboff, Arnold (May 1994). "What Is a Mind?" (PDF). Midwest Studies in Philosophy. 19 (1): 183–205. doi:10.1111/j.1475-4975.1994.tb00285.x.
- Zuboff, Arnold (September 1995). "Morality as What One Really Desires" (PDF). Midwest Studies in Philosophy. 20 (1): 142–164. doi:10.1111/j.1475-4975.1995.tb00309.x.
- Zuboff, Arnold (September 2000). "The Perspectival Nature of Probability and Inference" (PDF). Inquiry: An Interdisciplinary Journal of Philosophy. 43 (3): 353–358. doi:10.1080/002017400414908. S2CID 54894496.
- "Why Should I Care about Morality?". Philosophy Now. No. 31. March–April 2001. pp. 24–27.
- Zuboff, Arnold (Spring 2008). "Thoughts about a solution to the mind-body problem" (PDF). Think. 6 (17–18): 159–171. doi:10.1017/S1477175600003109. S2CID 145231233.
- "A Justification of Empirical Thinking". Philosophy Now. No. 102. May–June 2014. pp. 22–24.
- "Theories That Refute Themselves". Philosophy Now. No. 106. February–March 2015.

=== Book chapters ===
- Solomon, Robert C., ed. (1973). "Nietzsche and Eternal Recurrence" (PDF). Nietzsche: A Collection of Critical Essays. Doubleday Anchor. pp. 343–357.
- Hofstadter, Douglas R.; Dennett, Daniel C., eds. (1981). "The Story of a Brain" (PDF). The Mind's I. New York: Basic Books. pp. 202–212. ISBN 978-0-553-34584-1.

=== Other writings ===
- "An Introduction to Universalism".
- "Time, Self and Sleeping Beauty". ResearchGate. October 2008.
- "My 8 Big Ideas". ResearchGate. June 2011.
- Zuboff, Arnold (2015). "The Philosophical High Ground: Our World through the Eyes of Descartes, Spinoza, Leibniz, Locke, Berkeley, Hume and Kant". ResearchGate. doi:10.13140/RG.2.1.4642.8643.
- "A Justification of Empirical Inference" (PDF). PhilPapers.

=== Videos ===
- What You Really Are: A Talk and Discussion About Personal Identity. November 14, 2015.
- What You Really Are: A Demonstration Using Beads. December 7, 2015.
- Personal Identity and the Sleeping Beauty Problem. December 7, 2015.
- Finding Myself – And Undoing the Fear of Death as Annihilation. August 2, 2016.

== See also ==
- Open individualism – Theory of personal identity
