= James Pryor =

American philosopher (born 1968)

- Born: James Vincent Pryor; 1968 (age 57–58)

Education
- Education: Cornell University (B.A.); Princeton University (Ph.D.)
- Thesis: How to Be a Reasonable Dogmatist (1997)
- Doctoral advisor: Mark Johnston

Philosophical work
- Era: Contemporary philosophy
- Region: Western philosophy
- School: Analytic
- Institutions: University of North Carolina at Chapel Hill; New York University
- Doctoral students: Daniel Rothschild
- Main interests: philosophy of language
- Website: http://www.jimpryor.net/

James Vincent Pryor (born 1968) is an American philosopher and Professor of Philosophy at the University of North Carolina at Chapel Hill (UNC). He is known for his expertise on epistemology and philosophy of language. Before teaching at UNC, Pryor was a faculty member in the philosophy department of New York University. He has also taught at Harvard University and Princeton University.
