= José Zalabardo =

Spanish-British philosopher (born 1964)

- Born: 1964 (age 61–62)
- Education: Universidad Autónoma de Madrid; University of St Andrews; University of Michigan
- Scientific career
- Workplaces: University of Birmingham; University College London
- Thesis: Content and Objectivity (1994)
- Doctoral advisor: Crispin Wright; Paul Boghossian
- Website: http://jzalabardo.wix.com/jose-zalabardo

José Zalabardo (born 1964) is a Spanish-British philosopher who works on epistemology, metaphysics, and related areas. He is a professor of philosophy at University College London. He was Head of the UCL Philosophy Department from 2014 to 2018.

== Life ==
Zalabardo was born in Madrid, and grew up in Madrid and Zaragoza. He obtained his licenciatura from the Universidad Autónoma de Madrid, his MPhil from the University of St Andrews and his PhD in 1994 from the University of Michigan, where he studied with Crispin Wright and Paul Boghossian. From 1994 to 2000 he taught at the University of Birmingham. From 2000 he has taught at University College London, first as a lecturer, then as a reader, and now as a professor. Zalabardo is a recreational sailor, painter, and saxophonist.

== Books ==
Authored books

- Introduction to the Theory of Logic. Boulder, Colorado: Westview Press. 2000. ISBN 978-0813390611.
  - Spanish translation: Introducción a la teoría de la lógica. Madrid: Alianza. 2002. ISBN 978-8420678856.
- Scepticism and Reliable Belief. Oxford: Oxford University Press. 2012. ISBN 978-0199656073.
- Concepciones de lo real. Oviedo: KRK. 2012. ISBN 978-8483673645.
- Conocimiento y escepticismo. Ensayos de epistemología. Mexico City: Instituto de Investigaciones Filosóficas. 2014. ISBN 978-6070257728.
- Representation and Reality in Wittgenstein's Tractatus. Oxford: Oxford University Press. 2015. ISBN 978-0198743941.
- Pragmatist Semantics. Oxford: Oxford University Press. 2023. ISBN 978-0192874757.

Edited books

- Wittgenstein's Early Philosophy. Oxford: Oxford University Press. 2012. ISBN 978-0199691524.
- Wittgenstein's Tractatus Logico-Philosophicus. A Critical Guide. Cambridge: Cambridge University Press. 2024. ISBN 978-1316512548.
