= John Leonard Watling =

British philosopher (1923-2004)

- Born: 18 December 1923; East Sheen
- Died: 10 July 2004 (aged 80); Petersham

Philosophical work
- Era: 21st-century philosophy
- Region: Western philosophy
- School: Analytic
- Institutions: University College London

John Leonard Watling (18 December 1923 - 10 July 2004) was a British philosopher and Head of philosophy department at University College London.
