= Mark Eli Kalderon =

American philosopher (born 1964)

- Born: 1964 (age 61–62)

Education
- Education: Princeton University (Ph.D.); University of Michigan, Ann Arbor (B.A.)

Philosophical work
- Era: 21st-century philosophy
- Region: Western philosophy
- Institutions: University College London
- Main interests: philosophy of color, philosophy of perception

Mark Eli Kalderon (born 1964) is an American philosopher and Professor of Philosophy in the University College London Department of Philosophy. He is known for his expertise on philosophy of color and philosophy of perception.

== Early life and education ==
Kalderon was born in New York City.

He received a B.A. from the University of Michigan, Ann Arbor and a Ph.D. from Princeton University.

== Career ==
Kalderon has taught at University College London Department of Philosophy since 2000.

== Works and publications ==
=== Books ===
- Moral Fictionalism, Clarendon Press 2005
- Fictionalism in Metaphysics (ed.), Clarendon Press 2005
- Form Without Matter: Empedocles and Aristotle on Color Perception, Oxford University Press 2015
- Kalderon, Mark Eli (2017). Sympathy in Perception. Cambridge, England: Cambridge University Press. ISBN 978-1-108-41960-4. OCLC 1016957643.
