= Sleeping Beauty problem =

Mathematical problem

The Sleeping Beauty problem, also known as the Sleeping Beauty paradox, is a puzzle in decision theory in which an ideally rational epistemic agent is told she will be awoken from sleep either once or twice according to the toss of a coin. Each time she will have no memory of whether she has been awoken before, and is asked what her degree of belief that "the outcome of the coin toss is Heads" ought to be when she is first awakened.

Illustration of the original sleeping beauty problem

== History ==
The problem was originally formulated in unpublished work in the mid-1980s by Arnold Zuboff (the work was later published as "One Self: The Logic of Experience") followed by a paper by Adam Elga. A formal analysis of the problem of belief formation in decision problems with imperfect recall was provided first by Michele Piccione and Ariel Rubinstein in their paper: "On the Interpretation of Decision Problems with Imperfect Recall" where the "paradox of the absent minded driver" was first introduced and the Sleeping Beauty problem discussed as Example 5. The name "Sleeping Beauty" was given to the problem by Robert Stalnaker and was first used in extensive discussion in the Usenet newsgroup rec.puzzles in 1999. A more recent paper by Peter Winkler discussing different sides of the problem was published in The American Mathematical Monthly in 2017.

== The problem ==
As originally published by Elga, the problem was:

Some researchers are going to put you to sleep. During the two days that your sleep will last, they will briefly wake you up either once or twice, depending on the toss of a fair coin (Heads: once; Tails: twice). After each waking, they will put you back to sleep with a drug that makes you forget that waking. When you are first awakened, to what degree ought you believe that the outcome of the coin toss is Heads?

There are three superficial differences between Zuboff's unpublished versions, and the one Elga actually solved (which is not quite the same as the one he asked). They should not affect the solution method. Zuboff used a large number, N, of days. There was to be one waking per day after an unspecified coin-flip result, and one waking on a random day in that interval after the other result. Elga fixed N at 2, named Tails as the result where there were to be two wakings, and placed the one waking after Heads on day 1.

This has become the canonical form of the problem:

Sleeping Beauty volunteers to undergo the following experiment and is told all of the following details: On Sunday she will be put to sleep. Once or twice, during the experiment, Sleeping Beauty will be awakened, interviewed, and put back to sleep with an amnesia-inducing drug that makes her forget that awakening. A fair coin will be tossed to determine which experimental procedure to undertake:

- If the coin comes up heads, Sleeping Beauty will be awakened and interviewed on Monday only.
- If the coin comes up tails, she will be awakened and interviewed on Monday and Tuesday.

In either case, she will be awakened on Wednesday without interview and the experiment ends.

Any time Sleeping Beauty is awakened and interviewed she will not be able to tell which day it is or whether she has been awakened before. During the interview Sleeping Beauty is asked: "What is your credence now for the proposition that the coin landed heads?"

== Solutions ==
This problem continues to produce ongoing debate.

=== Thirder position ===
The thirder position argues that the probability of heads is 1/3. Adam Elga argued for this position originally as follows: Suppose Sleeping Beauty is told and she comes to fully believe that the coin landed tails. By even a highly restricted principle of indifference, given that the coin lands tails, her credence that it is Monday should equal her credence that it is Tuesday, since being in one situation would be subjectively indistinguishable from the other. In other words, P(Monday|Tails) = P(Tuesday|Tails), and thus

P(Tails and Tuesday) = P(Tails and Monday).

Suppose now that Sleeping Beauty is told upon awakening and comes to fully believe that it is Monday. Guided by the objective chance of heads landing being equal to the chance of tails landing, it should hold that P(Tails|Monday) = P(Heads|Monday), and thus

P(Tails and Tuesday) = P(Tails and Monday) = P(Heads and Monday).

Since these three outcomes are exhaustive and exclusive for one trial (and thus their probabilities must add to 1), the probability of each is then 1/3 by the previous two steps in the argument.

An alternative argument is as follows: Credence can be viewed as the amount a rational risk-neutral bettor would wager if the payoff for being correct is 1 unit (the wager itself being lost either way). In the heads scenario, Sleeping Beauty would spend her wager amount one time, and receive 1 money for being correct. In the tails scenario, she would spend her wager amount twice, and receive nothing. Her expected value is therefore to gain 0.5 but also lose 1.5 times her wager, thus she should break even if her wager is 1/3.

=== Halfer position ===
David Lewis responded to Elga's paper with the position that Sleeping Beauty's credence that the coin landed heads should be 1/2. Sleeping Beauty receives no new non-self-locating information throughout the experiment because she is told the details of the experiment. Since her credence before the experiment is P(Heads) = 1/2, she ought to continue to have a credence of P(Heads) = 1/2 since she gains no new relevant evidence when she wakes up during the experiment. This directly contradicts one of the thirder's premises, since it means P(Tails|Monday) = 1/3 and P(Heads|Monday) = 2/3.

Philosophers such as Christopher Hitchcock have argued against the halfer position by arguing that Sleeping Beauty is subject to Dutch books if she assigns a credence of 1/2. It has been argued that halfers can avoid Dutch books by adopting evidential decision theory. However, Vincent Conitzer argues that halfers are still affected by Dutch books even after adopting evidential decision theory.

=== Double halfer position ===
The double halfer position argues that both P(Heads) and P(Heads|Monday) equal 1/2. Mikaël Cozic, in particular, argues that context-sensitive propositions like "it is Monday" are in general problematic for conditionalization and proposes the use of an imaging rule instead, which supports the double halfer position.

=== Ambiguous-question position ===
Another approach to the Sleeping Beauty problem is to assert that the problem, as stated, is ambiguous. This view asserts that the thirder and halfer positions are both correct answers, but to different questions. The key idea is that the question asked of Sleeping Beauty, "what is your credence that the coin came up heads", is ambiguous. The question must be disambiguated based on the particular event whose probability we wish to measure. The two disambiguations are: "what is your credence that the coin landed heads in the act of tossing" and "what is your credence that the coin landed heads in the toss to set up this awakening"; to which, the correct answers are 1/2 and 1/3, respectively.

Another way to see the two different questions is to simplify the Sleeping Beauty problem as follows. Imagine tossing a coin, if the coin comes up heads, a green ball is placed into a box; if, instead, the coin comes up tails, two red balls are placed into a box. We repeat this procedure a large number of times until the box is full of balls. A single ball is then drawn from the box. In this setting, the question from the original problem resolves to one of two different questions: "what is the probability that a green ball was placed in the box" and "what is the probability a green ball was drawn from the box". These questions ask for the probability of two different events, and thus can have different answers, even though both events are causally dependent on the coin landing heads. (This fact is even more obvious when one considers the complementary questions: "what is the probability that two red balls were placed in the box" and "what is the probability that a red ball was drawn from the box".)

This view evidently violates the principle that, if event A happens if and only if event B happens, then we should have equal credence for event A and event B. However, this principle is not applicable because the sample spaces are different.

== In anthropics ==
Credence about what precedes awakenings is a core question in connection with the anthropic principle. Different assumptions in anthropics lead to different answers. In the book Anthropic Bias, Bostrom argues against the self-indication assumption (SIA), a term he uses to characterize some existing views, and introduces the self-sampling assumption (SSA). He later refines SSA into the strong self-sampling assumption (SSSA), which uses observer-moments instead of observers to address certain paradoxes in anthropic reasoning.

=== Self-sampling assumption ===
The self-sampling assumption (SSA) states that:

All other things equal, an observer should reason as if they are randomly selected from the set of all actually existent observers (past, present and future) in their reference class.

For instance, if there is a coin flip that on heads will create one observer, while on tails it will create two, then we have two possible worlds, the first with one observer, the second with two. These worlds are equally probable, hence the SSA probability of being the first (and only) observer in the heads world is 1 /2, that of being the first observer in the tails world is 1 /2 × 1 /2 = 1 /4, and the probability of being the second observer in the tails world is also 1 /4.

This is why SSA gives an answer of 1 /2 probability of heads in the Sleeping Beauty problem.

Unlike SIA, SSA is dependent on the choice of reference class. If the agents in the above example were in the same reference class as a trillion other observers, then the probability of being in the heads world, upon the agent being told they are in the sleeping beauty problem, is ≈ 1 /3, similar to SIA. SSA may imply the doomsday argument depending on the choice of reference class.

Bostrom has suggested refining SSA to what he calls the strong self-sampling assumption (SSSA), which replaces "observers" in the SSA definition by "observer-moments". This coincides with the intuition that an observer who lives longer has more opportunities to experience herself existing, and it provides flexibility to refine reference classes in certain thought experiments in order to avoid paradoxical conclusions.

=== Self-indication assumption ===
The self-indication assumption (SIA) is a philosophical principle defined in Anthropic Bias. It states that:

All other things equal, an observer should reason as if they are randomly selected from the set of all possible observers.

Note that "randomly selected" is weighted by the probability of the observers existing: under SIA you are still unlikely to be an unlikely observer, unless there are a lot of them.

For instance, if there is a coin flip that on heads will create one observer, while on tails it will create two, then we have three possible observers (1st observer on heads, 1st on tails, 2nd on tails). Each of these observers have an equal probability for existence, so SIA assigns 1 /3 probability to each. Alternatively, this could be interpreted as saying there are two possible observers (1st observer on either heads or tails, 2nd observer on tails), the first existing with probability one and the second existing with probability 1 /2, so SIA assigns 2 /3 to being the first observer and 1 /3 to being the second - which is the same as the first interpretation.

This is why SIA gives an answer of 1 /3 probability of heads in the Sleeping Beauty Problem.

Notice that unlike SSA, SIA is not dependent on the choice of reference class, as long as the reference class is large enough to contain all subjectively indistinguishable observers. If the reference class is large, SIA will make it more likely, but this is compensated by the much reduced probability that the agent will be that particular agent in the larger reference class.

== Variations ==
=== Extreme Sleeping Beauty ===
This differs from the original in that there are one million and one wakings if tails comes up. It was formulated by Nick Bostrom.

=== A Variant with Two Coins ===
One variant formulated by Vincent Conitzer involves two fair coins being tossed. Sleeping Beauty is awakened on both Monday and Tuesday, where she is shown the outcome of one of the coins. On Monday, Sleeping Beauty is shown the outcome of Coin One, and she is shown the outcome of Coin Two on Tuesday. She cannot tell each of the coins apart, and therefore cannot tell what day it is based on the coins. Sleeping Beauty is then asked to assign a probability to each of the coin flips being the same, i.e. both heads or both tails. Conitzer argues that applying the Halfer rule results in a probability of ⅓, which he argues is a violation of the reflection principle.

=== Sailor's Child problem ===
The Sailor's Child problem, introduced by Radford M. Neal, is somewhat similar. It involves a sailor who regularly sails between ports. In one port there is a woman who wants to have a child with him, across the sea there is another woman who also wants to have a child with him. The sailor cannot decide if he will have one or two children, so he will leave it up to a coin toss. If Heads, he will have one child, and if Tails, two children (one with each woman; presumably the children will never meet). But if the coin lands on Heads, which woman would have his child? He would decide this by looking at The Sailor's Guide to Ports and the woman in the port that appears first would be the woman that he has a child with. You are his child. You do not have a copy of The Sailor's Guide to Ports. What is the probability that you are his only child, thus the coin landed on Heads (assuming a fair coin)?

== See also ==
- Bayesian probability
- Boy or girl paradox
- Doomsday argument
- Monty Hall problem
