= University College London Faculty of Arts and Humanities =

UCL Faculty of Arts and Humanities
- Dean: Stella Bruzzi
- Academic staff: 380 (as of December 2018)
- Administrative staff: 72 (as of December 2018)
- Students: 3,828 (2019/20)
- Undergraduates: 2,699
- Postgraduates: 1,129
- Location: London, United Kingdom
- Website: UCL Faculty of Arts and Humanities

The Faculty of Arts and Humanities (popularly known as UCL Faculty of Arts & Humanities) is one of the 11 constituent faculties of University College London (UCL). The current Executive Dean is Professor Stella Bruzzi, FBA.

== History ==
In October 2013 it was announced that the Translation Studies Unit of Imperial College London would move to UCL, becoming part of the UCL School of European Languages, Culture & Society.

== Departments ==
The Faculty currently comprises the following departments:

- UCL Department of Arts and Sciences
- UCL Department of English Language and Literature
- UCL Department of European and International Social and Political Sciences
- UCL Department of Greek & Latin (Classics)
- UCL Department of Hebrew and Jewish Studies
- UCL Department of Information Studies
- UCL Department of Philosophy
- School of European Languages, Culture & Society (SELCS)
- School of Slavonic and East European Studies (SSEES)
- UCL Slade School of Fine Art
- Institute of Advanced Studies

SELCS offers the widest range of language-based degrees in the UK, with programmes in Dutch, French, German, Italian, Scandinavian, Iberian and Latin American Studies as well as cutting-edge interdisciplinary programmes in Comparative Literature, Early Modern, European, Film, Health, Gender, Race and Translation Studies.

== Research ==
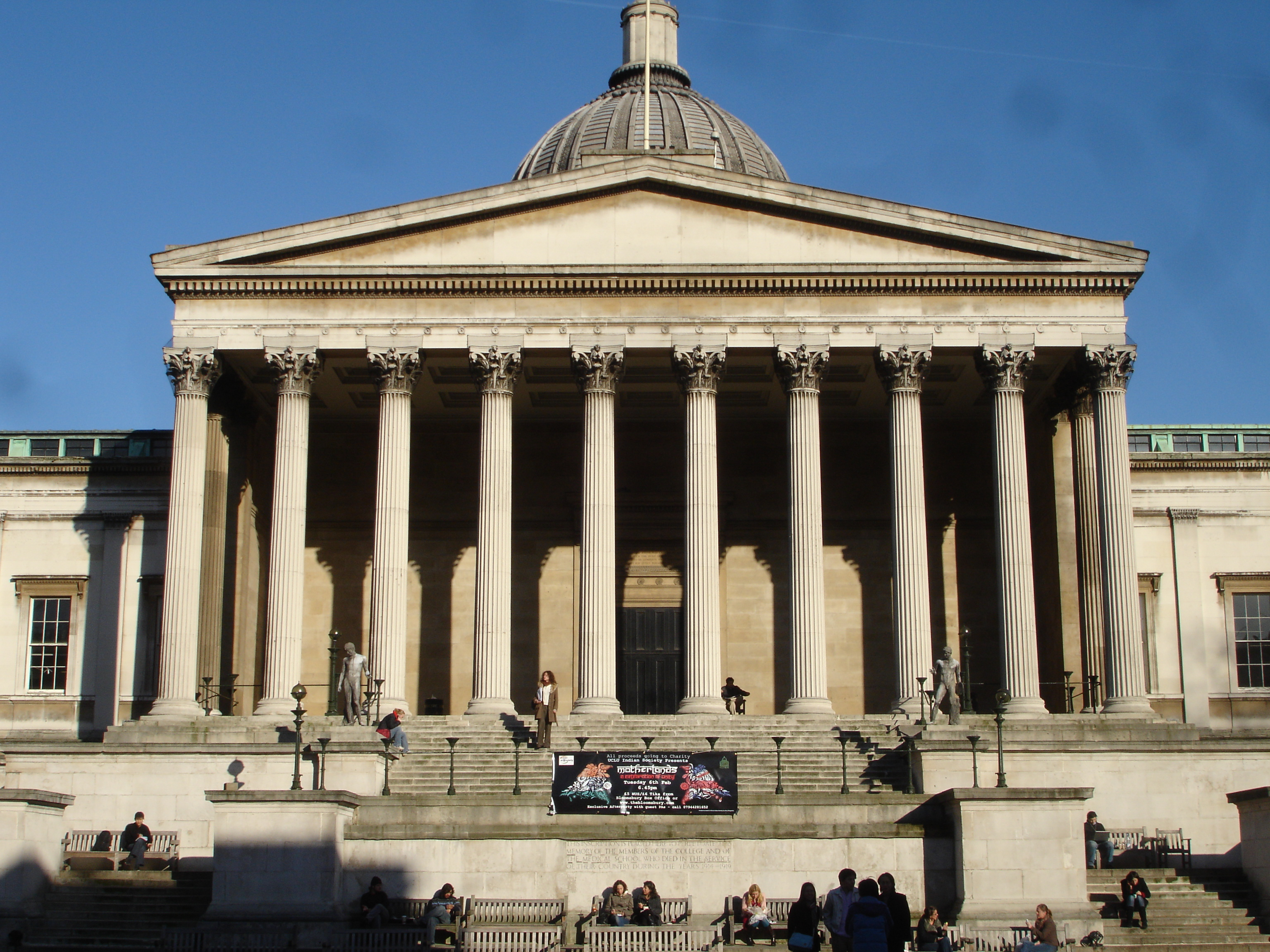
University College London

The impacts of UCL Arts & Humanities research on the wider world have been recognised in the Research Excellence Framework 2021 (REF2021). The Faculty of Arts and Humanities, was ranked 6th in the UK in terms of Research Power in the REF2021.

== Rankings ==
In the 2013 QS World University Rankings, UCL was ranked 8th in the world (and 3rd in Europe) for Arts and Humanities. In the 2014 QS World University Rankings by Subject, UCL was ranked 15th in the world (and 4th in Europe) for English Language and Literature, 8th in the world (and 3rd in Europe) for Modern Languages and joint 51st-100th in the world (and joint 16th in Europe) for Philosophy. In the 2016/2017 QS World University Rankings, UCL is currently ranked 7th in the world. It also holds its highest historical ranking for Arts and Humanities at 4th in the world, according to the Times Higher Education World University Rankings.

== See also ==
- UCL Centre for Digital Humanities
- UCL Institute of Jewish Studies
- Slade Centre for Electronic Media in Fine Art
