= Grote Professor of the Philosophy of Mind and Logic =

The Grote Chair of the Philosophy of Mind and Logic is an endowed chair at University College London's Department of Philosophy.

== Origin ==
Along with Moral Philosophy, Philosophy of Mind and Logic (originally called Logic and the Philosophy of the Human Mind) was one of two Philosophy chairs established at the founding of University College London. The first Mind and Logic professorship was awarded to John Hoppus, a Congregational minister, who held the position from 1830 to 1866. George Grote, one of the college's founders and a member of its governing council, objected to the appointment on the grounds that the college was intended to be non-sectarian and that therefore a philosophy chair should not be held by a minister of religion. Because of this incident, Grote resigned from the council in 1830. In 1866 Grote, who had returned to the council in 1849, was instrumental in preventing the awarding of the chair to James Martineau, a Unitarian minister, for the same reasons. Grote's preferred candidate, George Croom Robertson, was appointed to the chair in 1867.

Grote's will provided an endowment of £6000 for the Chair of Philosophy of Mind and Logic, with the stipulation that the income could not be awarded to a holder of the chair who was a minister of any religion. Instead, the income was to be held back and reinvested until a lay person was again appointed. Grote died in 1871 and in 1876, two years before her own death, his widow Harriet Grote passed on the £6000 to the college.

== Grote Professors of the Philosophy of Mind and Logic ==
- 1867-1892 George Croom Robertson
- 1892-1903 James Sully
- 1903-1911 Carveth Read
- 1911-1928 Charles Spearman
- 1929-1944 John Macmurray
- 1944-1959 A. J. Ayer
- 1960-1963 Stuart Hampshire
- 1963-1982 Richard Wollheim
- The chair was vacant from 1982 to 1988
- 1988-1998 Ted Honderich
- 1998-2001 Malcolm Budd
- 2001-2015 Paul Snowdon
- 2018- John Hyman
