= John Hyman (philosopher) =

British philosopher (born 1960)

John Hyman (born 6 March 1960) is a British philosopher. He was Professor of Aesthetics at the University of Oxford before being appointed as Grote Professor of the Philosophy of Mind and Logic at University College London in September 2018.

Hyman received his BA, BPhil and DPhil at the University of Oxford, and was elected to a Fellowship at The Queen's College, Oxford in 1988 after working in Israel at the Hebrew University in Jerusalem. He edited the British Journal of Aesthetics from 2008 to 2018. He held a Getty Scholarship at the Getty Research Institute, Los Angeles, in 2001–2002, a Fellowship at the Wissenschaftskolleg zu Berlin in 2002–2003, and a Leverhulme Major Research Fellowship in 2010–2012. He was Professeur Invité in the UFR de Philosophie at the University of Paris-Sorbonne (Paris IV) in 2014–2015.

His research is in the fields of epistemology and metaphysics, philosophy of mind and action, aesthetics and philosophy of art, and Wittgenstein. He is known for his analysis of knowledge as an ability, and for his criticism of the idea that neuroscience can explain the nature of art.

In 2018, Hyman began a five-year research project entitled Roots of Responsibility, supported by an ERC Advanced Grant, which "advance traditional philosophical debates about responsibility and free will by exploring the network of human capacities responsibility involves and the social, institutional and interpersonal contexts in which questions about responsibility arise, cutting across traditional boundaries between metaphysics, epistemology, ethics, and philosophy of law."

== Publications ==
The following is a partial list of Hyman's publications.

=== Monographs ===
- Action, Knowledge, and Will. Oxford University Press, 2015, ISBN 978-0198735779. (abstract)
- The Objective Eye: color, form and reality in the theory of art. Chicago University Press, 2006, ISBN 978-0226365534. (abstract)
- The Imitation of Nature. Blackwell, 1989, ISBN 978-0071365017.

=== Edited volumes ===
- A Companion to Wittgenstein (with Hans-Johann Glock). Wiley-Blackwell, 2017. ISBN 978-1118641163. (abstract)
- Wittgenstein and Analytic Philosophy. Essays for P. M. S. Hacker (with Hans-Johann Glock). Oxford University Press, 2009. ISBN 978-0199213238. (abstract)
- Agency and Action (with Helen Steward). Cambridge University Press, 2004. ISBN 978-0521603560.
- Investigating Psychology. (with Helen Steward). Routledge, 1991. ISBN 978-0415019828.

=== Articles ===
==== Knowledge and perception ====
- ‘Knowledge and Belief’, Proceedings of the Aristotelian Society, suppl. vol., June 2017. 267–288.
- ‘The most general factive stative attitude’, Analysis, 2014. 561–565.
- ‘The road to Larissa’, Ratio Special Issue: Agents and their Actions, ed. M. De Gaynesford, Wiley-Blackwell, 2011.
- ‘Knowledge and evidence’, Mind, 2006. 633–658.
- ‘What, if anything, are colours relative to?’, Philosophy, 2005. 475–494.
- ‘How knowledge works’, Phil. Quarterly, October 1999. 433–451; German translation: “Wie Wissen funktioniert’, in Conceptions of Knowledge, ed. Stefan Tolksdorf, de Gruyter, 2012. 101–125.
- ‘Vision and power’, The Journal of Philosophy, 1994. 235–252.
- ‘The causal theory of perception’, Phil. Quarterly, 1992. 277–296.

==== Visual Arts ====
- ‘Depiction’, with K. Bantinaki, Stanford Encyclopedia of Philosophy, June 2017. Available online.
- ‘Depiction’, in Philosophy and the Arts, ed. A. O’Hear, CUP, 2013; repr. in What Are Artworks, and How Do We Experience Them?, ed. Peer F. Bundgaard, Springer, 2015.
- ‘Art and neuroscience’, originally published online, 'Art and Cognition Workshops, 2006. Printed publication in Beyond Mimesis and Convention: Representation in Art and Science, ed. R. Frigg and M. Hunter, Springer Verlag, 2010; German translation in Kunst und Kognition, ed. M. Bauer et al, Wilhelm Fink Verlag, 2006; brief version: ‘In search of the big picture’, New Scientist, issue 2563, 5 August 2006 (& podcast); Greek translation: Cogito, June 2007; Spanish translation in Neuroestética, ed. Antonio Martín Araguz, 2011.
- ‘Replies to Zed Adams, Malcolm Budd, Will Davies and Paolo Spinicci’, in a symposium on The Objective Eye, in Lebenswelt 2, 2012.
- ‘Realism and relativism in the theory of art’, Proc. of the Aristotelian Society, 2004. 25–53.

==== Mind and action ====
- ‘Voluntariness and intention’, Jurisprudence, December 2016. 692–709.
- ‘Philosophy of Action’, with M. Alvarez, in Cambridge History of Philosophy 1945-2015, ed. K. Becker & I. Thomson, CUP, 2019. 103–114.
- ‘Desires, Dispositions, and Deviant Causal Chains’, Philosophy, 2014. 83–112.
- ‘Voluntariness and choice’, Philosophical Quarterly, 2013. 683–708.
- ‘Pains and places’, Philosophy, 2003. 5–24.
- ‘-ings and -ers’, Ratio Special Issue: Meaning and Representation, December 2001. 298–317.
- ‘Agents and their actions’ (with Maria Alvarez), Philosophy, 1998. 219–245.

==== Wittgenstein ====
- ‘Wittgenstein on action and the will’, Grazer Philosophische Studien: Themes From Early Analytic Philosophy: essays in honour of Wolfgang Künne, ed. B. Schneider & M. Schulz, Rodolpi, 2011; repr. in The Oxford Handbook of Wittgenstein, ed. Marie McGinn, OUP, 2011.
- ‘Wittgenstein’, in A Companion to the Philosophy of Religion, second edition, ed. P. Draper & C. Tagliaferro, Wiley-Blackwell, 2010.
- ‘The urn and the chamber-pot’, in Wittgenstein, Culture and the Arts, ed. R. Allen, Routledge, 2001; French translation: ‘L’urne et le pot de chambre’ in Revue de synthèse, 2006/1; Italian translation: ‘L’urna e il vaso da notte’ in Wittgenstein, l’estetica e le arti, ed. Elisa Caldarola et al., Carocci, 2013.
- ‘El evangelio segun Wittgenstein’, Revista de Filosofia, 1998. 231–244.
