= Hunting hypothesis =

Killing wildlife in human evolution

In paleoanthropology, the hunting hypothesis is the hypothesis that human evolution was primarily influenced by the activity of hunting for relatively large and fast animals, and that the activity of hunting distinguished human ancestors from other hominins.

While it is undisputed that early humans were hunters, the importance of this fact for the final steps in the emergence of the genus Homo out of earlier australopithecines, with its bipedalism and production of stone tools (from about 2.5 million years ago), and eventually also control of fire (from about 1.5 million years ago), is emphasized in the "hunting hypothesis", and de-emphasized in scenarios that stress the omnivore status of humans as their recipe for success, and social interaction, including mating behaviour as essential in the emergence of language and culture.

Advocates of the hunting hypothesis tend to believe that tool use and toolmaking essential to effective hunting were an extremely important part of human evolution, and trace the origin of language and religion to a hunting context.

As societal evidence David Buss cites that modern tribal population deploy hunting as their primary way of acquiring food. The Aka pygmies in the Central African Republic spend 56% of their quest for nourishment hunting, 27% gathering, and 17% processing food. Additionally, the !Kung in Botswana retain 40% of their calories from hunting and this percentage varies from 20% to 90% depending on the season. For physical evidence Buss first looks to the guts of humans and apes. The human gut consists mainly of the small intestines, which are responsible for the rapid breakdown of proteins and absorption of nutrients. The ape's gut is primarily colon, which indicates a vegetarian diet. This structural difference supports the hunting hypothesis in being an evolutionary branching point between modern humans and modern primates. Buss also cites human teeth in that fossilized human teeth have a thin enamel coating with very little heavy wear and tear that would result from a plant diet. The absence of thick enamel also indicates that historically humans have maintained a meat-heavy diet. Buss notes that the bones of animals human ancestors killed found at Olduvai Gorge have cut marks at strategic points on the bones that indicate tool usage and provide evidence for ancestral butchers.

Women are theorized to have participated in hunting, either on their own or as a collective group effort. It is suggested that in the past, women targeted low but guaranteed food, whereas men targeted higher risk higher reward food. The Gathering Hypothesis is a view that states men provided the evolution of the current human through hunting while women contributed via gathering. Though criticized by many, it provides clues that both hunting and gathering were patterns of acquiring food and resources.

== Applications ==
=== Sexual division of labor ===
According to the hunting hypothesis, women are preoccupied with pregnancy and dependent children and so do not hunt because it is dangerous and less profitable. In addition, subsistence labor differentiates as observations suggests gender patterns originate from genetic traits. Another possible explanation for women gathering is their inherent prioritization of rearing offspring, which is difficult to uphold if women were hunting. Hunting is seen as more cost effective for men than for women. The division of labor allows both types of resources (animals and plants) to be utilized. Individual and small group hunting requires patience and skill more than strength, whereas plant gathering may be more physically demanding and require greater endurance. Women can hunt while menstruating and can carry children of breastfeeding age in a shoulder sling while hunting or gathering. Women hunt when it is compatible with children, and this usually means communal net hunts and/or hunting small game, and if childcare prevents a woman from hunting when young, the expertise to be an effective hunter later on may not be acquired.

=== Women's involvement ===
Though the hunting hypothesis is still contested, many have theorized that women's involvement in hunter-gathering was considerably greater than previously thought. The majority of human evolutionary history consisted of hunter-gathering. As such, both males and females developed the necessary skills to hunt and gather, including endurance, movement coordination, and athleticism. Hunting big game requires collaborative effort, thus participation from all able bodies was encouraged which included females. In addition, spear-throwers required more energy to be utilized so contributions from everyone, including females, mitigated the energy exerted to use Atlatls. Extant examples include the Martu women in western Australia, for example, who frequently hunt goannas and skink. Women also participate in communal game drives. A study by anthropologist Robert Kelly of Agta hunters found that women returned with a kill 31 percent of the time, whereas men averaged 17 percent. The women's expertise with hunting was further shown with mixed groups of male and female hunters being the most successful, coming home with kills 41 percent of the time. Agta females who have reached the end of their childbearing years, those with children old enough to look after themselves in camp, or those who are sterile are the ones who intentionally hunt. Kelly notes that Agta women tend to target reliable but low-return-rate foods, whereas men target less reliable but high-return-rate foods. This could be an explanation as to why women weren't commonly documented as hunters.

== Provisioning hypothesis ==
=== Parental investment ===
Buss purports that the hunting hypothesis explains the high level of human male parental investment in offspring compared to primates. Meat is an economical and condensed food resource in that it can be brought home to feed the young, as it is not efficient to carry low-calorie food across great distances. Thus, the act of hunting and the required transportation of the kill in order to feed offspring is a reasonable explanation for human male provisioning.

=== Male coalitions ===
Buss suggests that the Hunting hypothesis also explains the advent of strong male coalitions. Although chimpanzees form male-male coalitions, they tend to be temporary and opportunistic. In contrast, large game hunters require consistent and coordinated cooperation to succeed in large game hunting. Thus male coalitions are the result of working together to succeed in providing meat for the hunters themselves and their families. Anthropologist Kristen Hawkes suggests further that obtaining resources intended for community consumption increases a male's social standing within a larger group. Male relationships would improve hunting success and create alliances for future conflict while female relationships would improve direct reproductive success. Buss proposes alternate explanations of emergence of the strong male coalitions. He suggests that male coalitions may have been the result of group-on-group aggression, defense, and in-group political alliances. This explanation does not support the relationship between male coalitions and hunting.

Hawkes proposes that hunters pursue large game and divide the kill across the group. Hunters compete to divvy up the kill to signal courage, power, generosity, prosocial intent, and dedication. By engaging in these activities, hunters receive reproductive benefits and respect. These reproductive benefits lead to greater reproductive success in more skilled hunters. Evidence of these hunting goals that do not only benefit the families of the hunters are in the Ache and Hadza men. Hawkes notes that their hunting techniques are less efficient than alternative methods and are energetically costly, but the men place more importance on displaying their bravery, power, and prosocial intent than on hunting efficiency. This method is different as compared to other societies where hunters retain control of their kills and signal their intent of sharing. This alternate method aligns with the coalition support hypothesis, in efforts to create and preserve political associations.

=== Reciprocal altruism ===
The meat from successful large game hunts are more than what a single hunter can consume. Further, hunting success varies by week. One week a hunter may succeed in hunting large game and the next may return with no meat. In this situation Buss suggests that there are low costs to giving away meat that cannot be eaten by the individual hunter on his own and large benefits from the expectation of the returned favor in a week where his hunting is not successful. Hawkes calls this sharing "tolerated theft" and purports that the benefits of reciprocal altruism stem from the result that families will experience "lower daily variation and higher daily average" in their resources.

Provisioning may actually be a form of sexual competition between males for females. Hawkes suggests that male provisioning is a particularly human behavior, which forges the nuclear family. The structure of familial provisioning determines a form of resource distribution. However, Hawkes does acknowledge inconsistencies across societies and contexts such as the fluctuating time courses dedicated to hunting and gathering, which are not directly correlated with return rates, the fact that nutrition value is often chosen over caloric count, and the fact that meat is a more widely spread resource than other resources.

=== The show-off hypothesis ===
The show-off hypothesis is the concept that more successful men have better mate options. The idea relates back to the fact that meat, the result of hunting expeditions, is a distinct resource in that it comes in large quantities that more often than not the hunter's own family is not able to consume in a timely manner so that the meat does not expire. The success of hunting is also unpredictable whereas foraged plants, unless there is a drought or poor seasonal yield, are fairly consistent. Kristen Hawkes argues that women favor neighbors opting for men who provide the advantageous, yet infrequent meat feasts. These women may profit from alliance and the resulting feasts, especially in times of shortage. Hawkes suggests that it would be beneficial for women to reward men who employ the "show-off strategy" by supporting them in a dispute, caring for their offspring, or providing sexual favors. The benefits women may gain from their alignment lie in favored treatment of the offspring spawned by the show-off from neighbors. Buss echoes and cites Hawke's thoughts on the show-off's benefits in sexual access, increased likelihood of having children, and the favorable treatment his children would receive from the other members of the society. Hawkes also suggests that show-offs are more likely to live in large groups and thus be less susceptible to predators. Show-offs gain more benefits from just sharing with their family (classical fitness) in the potential favorable treatment from the community and reciprocal altruism from other members of the community.

Hawkes uses the Ache people of Paraguay as evidence for the Show-off hypothesis. Food acquired by men was more widely distributed across the community and inconsistent resources that came in large quantities when acquired were also more widely shared.

While this is represented in the Ache according to Hawkes, Buss notes that this trend is contradicted in the Hadza who evenly distribute the meat across all members of their population and whose hunters have very little control over the distribution. In the Hadza the show-off hypothesis does not have to do with the resources that result from hunting, but from the prestige and risk that is involved in big game hunting. There are possible circuitous benefits such as protection and defense.

=== The gathering hypothesis ===
The gathering hypothesis is the view that men provided critical evolutionary propulsion of the modern human through hunting, whereas women contributed via gathering. In addition, it helps provide for the fact that our ancestor's diets consisted mostly of plant food. Buss suggests that stone tools were invented not strictly for hunting, but for gathering and digging up plants and roots. This could explain the migration from forests to woodlands as tools allowed easy access to previously-used methods. Gathering plant foods allows a person to return to camp when necessary, but hunting may demand multiple days of tracking large game.

=== The gathering hypothesis controversy ===
The gathering hypothesis has been criticized by those who believe it's incapable of explaining human development. A common argument against the gathering hypothesis is that gathering is a less efficient method of food acquisition, demonstrated by the persistence of hunting alongside gathering. The division of labor among men and woman is unaccounted for throughout cultures. Locating and gathering edible nuts, berries, fruit, and tubers would require a different set of spatial skills. The high prevalence of male hunters and female gatherers among traditional societies, although not conclusive evidence, provides one more clue that both activities were part of the human pattern of procuring food.

== See also ==
- Acheulean
- Behavioral modernity
- Endurance running hypothesis
- Gathering hypothesis
- Homo ergaster
- Hunter-gatherer
- Killer ape theory
- Oldowan
