= Malcolm Budd =

British philosopher (1941–2026)

Malcolm John Budd FBA (23 December 1941 – 17 February 2026) was a British philosopher.

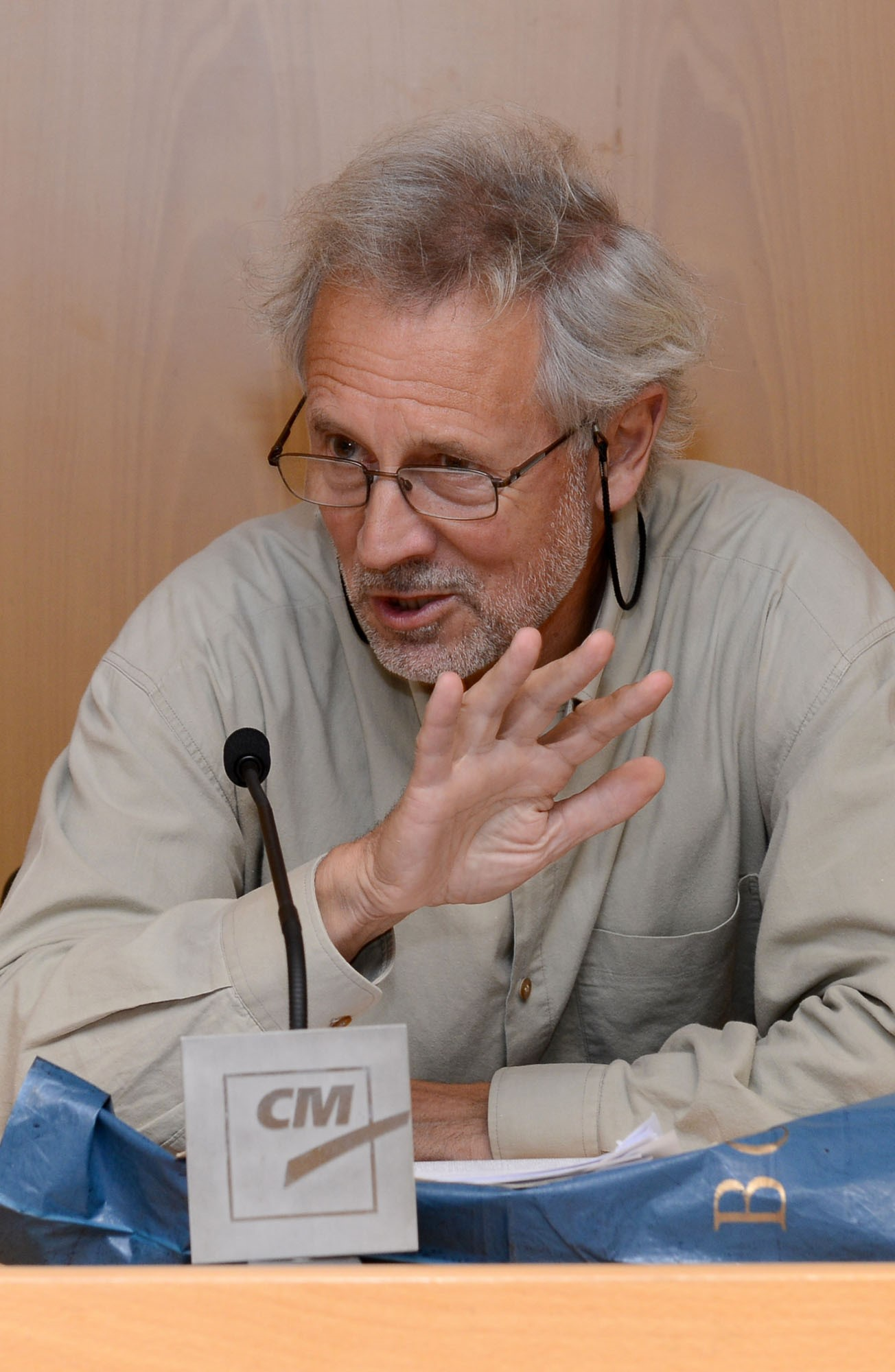
Budd in 2013

== Life and career ==
Budd was born in Whitton, south-west London, on 23 December 1941. He studied mathematics and philosophy at Jesus College, Cambridge. He taught at University College London from 1970 until 2001, and was appointed the Grote Professor of the Philosophy of Mind and Logic from 1998 until his retirement. He held an emeritus position.

He was best known for his work in analytic aesthetics. He published work on the expressive powers of music, the aesthetic appreciation of nature, and the values of art.

Regarding the expressive powers of (purely instrumental) music, Budd was known for defending a type of resemblance theory in which music resembled some feature of emotions. Unlike Peter Kivy and Stephen Davies, Budd argued that music resembled the way that emotions feel.

Budd was elected a Fellow of the British Academy in 1995.

Budd died from complications of Alzheimer's disease on 17 February 2026, aged 84.

== Publications ==
The following is a partial list of Budd's publications:

Monographs

- Music and the emotions (1985)
- Wittgenstein's philosophy of psychology (1989)
- Values of art (1995)
- The Aesthetic Appreciation of Nature (2002)
- Aesthetic essays (2008)

Articles

- Budd, M. (1980). The repudiation of emotion: Hanslick on music. The British Journal of Aesthetics, 20(1), 29–43.
- Budd, M. (1987). Wittgenstein on seeing aspects. Mind, 96(381), 1–17.
- Budd, M. (1989). Music and the Communication of Emotion. The Journal of Aesthetics and Art Criticism, 47(2), 129–138.
- Budd, M. (2001). The pure judgement of taste as an aesthetic reflective judgement. The British Journal of Aesthetics, 41(3), 247–260.
- Budd, M. (2003). The acquaintance principle. The British Journal of Aesthetics, 43(4), 386–392.
- Budd, M. (2005). Aesthetic realism and emotional qualities of music. The British Journal of Aesthetics, 45(2), 111–122.
- Budd, M. (2006). The characterization of aesthetic qualities by essential metaphors and quasi-metaphors. The British Journal of Aesthetics, 46(2), 133–143.
- Budd, M. (2007). The intersubjective validity of aesthetic judgements. The British Journal of Aesthetics, 47(4), 333–371.
