= List of women philosophers =

This is a list of women philosophers ordered alphabetically by surname. Although often overlooked in mainstream historiography, women have engaged in philosophy throughout the field's history. Some notable philosophers include Maitreyi (1000 BC), Gargi Vachaknavi (900 BC), Ghosha (800 BC), Hypatia of Alexandria (c. 370–415 AD), Anne Conway (1631–1679), Mary Wollstonecraft (1759–1797), Harriet Martineau (1802–1876), Sarah Margaret Fuller (1810–1850), Frances Power Cobbe (1822–1904), Vernon Lee (1856–1935), Edith Stein (1891–1942), Ayn Rand (1905–1982), Hannah Arendt (1906–1975), María Zambrano (1904–1991), Simone de Beauvoir (1908–1986), Iris Murdoch (1919–1999), Elizabeth Anscombe (1919–2001), Mary Midgley (1919–2018), Philippa Foot (1920–2010), Mary Warnock (1924–2019), Joyce Mitchell Cook (1933–2015, the first African American woman to receive a Ph.D. in philosophy), Cora Diamond (born 1937), Susan Haack (1945-2026).

== By period ==
=== Ancient philosophy ===
- Lopamudra (born 1100 BC)
- Maitreyi (born about 1000 BC)
- Ghosha (born vedic period)
- Gargi Vachaknavi (born about 700 BC)
- Theano of Croton (6th century BC)
- Aristoclea of Delphi (6th century BC)
- Khujjuttarā (6th century BC)
- Aspasia of Miletus (approx. 470–400 BC)
- Arete of Cyrene (4th century BC)
- Hipparchia of Maroneia (4th century BC)
- Nicarete of Megara (fl. around 300 BC)
- Ptolemais of Cyrene (3rd century BC)
- Aesara of Lucania (3rd century BC)
- Diotima of Mantinea (appears in Plato's Symposium)
- Ban Zhao (c. 35–100)^{D2}
- Catherine of Alexandria (282–305)
- Sosipatra of Ephesus (4th century AD)
- Xie Daoyun (before 340–after 399)
- Hypatia (c. 360–415 AD)
- Aedesia of Alexandria (5th century AD)
- Theodora (5th-6th century AD)

=== Medieval philosophy ===
From the fall of the Western Roman Empire in the 5th century AD to the Renaissance in the 16th century.

- Khana (born 8th-12th century AD)
- Ubhaya Bharati (8th century), moderated the debate between Adi Shankara and Mandana Mishra, then challenged Shankara herself.
- Héloïse d'Argenteuil (1095–1164), contributed to the ethical thought of Peter Abelard.
- Hildegard of Bingen (1098–1179), German abbess, composer, and philosopher.
- Akka Mahadevi (c.1130–1160), Kannada mystic, considered a saint in the Lingayat denomination of Hinduism.
- Marguerite Porete (1250–1310), French mystic, author of The Mirror of Simple Souls, burnt at the stake for heresy.
- Lalleshwari (1320–1392), Kashmiri mystic, an influence on both Trika Shaivism and the Rishi Order of Sufis.
- Catherine of Siena (1347–1380), Italian mystic, one of the most influential women of the 14th Century.
- Christine de Pizan (1364–1430), successful author and promoter of famous women
- Mirabai (1498–1546), considered a saint in the Bhakti Movement due to her devotion to Krishna.
- Tullia d'Aragona (c. 1510–1556), Italian courtesan who argued for the social and religious acceptance of sexual desire.
- Teresa of Ávila (1515–1582), Spanish mystic, co-founded the Discalced Carmelites with John of the Cross.
- Moderata Fonte (1555–1592), author of the dialogue The Worth of Women.

=== Modern philosophy ===
It is still debated when the Modern period began, but some scholars place 15th and 16th century philosophers into the category of “Early Modern Philosophy”, and those in the 17th through the early 20th centuries into the categories of Modern and “Post Modern” philosophy.

- Marie de Gournay (1565–1645)
- Anna Maria van Schurman (1607–1678)
- Madeleine de Scudéry (1607–1701)
- Elisabeth of Bohemia (1618–1680)^{A} ^{B} ^{C} ^{R}
- Margaret Cavendish (1623–1673)^{A} ^{B} ^{C} ^{R}
- Gabrielle Suchon (1631–1703)
- Anne Conway (1631–1679)^{A} ^{B} ^{C} ^{D1} ^{O} ^{R} ^{W}
- Madame de Maintenon (1635–1719)
- Sor Juana Inés de la Cruz (1648–1695)
- Damaris Cudworth Masham (1659–1708), philosopher and theologian
- Mary Astell (1666–1731)^{A} ^{B} ^{C} ^{D1} ^{D2} ^{R}
- Catharine Trotter Cockburn (1679–1749)^{A} ^{B} ^{C} ^{R} ^{W}
- Émilie du Châtelet (1706–1749)^{R}
- Laura Bassi (1711–1778), philosopher and physicist
- Mary Wollstonecraft (1759–1797)
- Sophie de Grouchy (1764–1822)
- Germaine de Staël (1766–1817)
- Harriet Martineau (1802–1876)
- George Eliot (Mary Ann Evans) (1819–1880)^{G} ^{R}
- Frances Power Cobbe (1822–1904)
- Antoinette Brown Blackwell (1825–1921)^{D2}
- Helena Blavatsky (1831–1891)
- Annie Besant (1847-1933)
- Gauri Ma (1857–1938)
- Jane Addams (1860–1935)
- Sister Nivedita (1867–1911)

=== Contemporary philosophy ===
- Felicia Nimue Ackerman (fl. 2014)
- Marilyn McCord Adams (1943–2017)^{O}
- Alia Al-Saji (fl. 2014)
- Lilli Alanen (1941–2021)
- Linda Martín Alcoff (born 1955)
- Amy Allen (fl. 2014)
- Alice Ambrose (1906–2001)
- Elizabeth Anderson (born 1959)
- Lou Andreas-Salomé (1861–1937)
- Julia Annas (born 1946)
- G. E. M. Anscombe (1919–2001)^{C} ^{O} ^{R} ^{W}
- Louise Antony (fl. 2014)
- Hannah Arendt (1906–1975), political theorist^{C} ^{O} ^{R} ^{W}
- Nomy Arpaly (fl. 2014)
- Anita Avramides (born 1952)
- Babette Babich (born 1956)
- Annette Baier (1929–2012)^{O}
- Karen Barad (born 1956)
- Shahidha Bari (born 1980)
- Dorit Bar-On (fl. 1990)
- Marcia Baron (fl. 2014)
- Lauren Barthold (born 1965)
- Sandra Bartky (1935–2016)
- Nancy Bauer (born 1960)
- Simone de Beauvoir (1908–1986), author, feminist^{D1} ^{O} ^{R} ^{W}
- Helen Beebee (fl. 2014)
- Seyla Benhabib (born 1950)
- Tina Fernandes Botts (fl. 2014)
- Peg Birmingham (fl. 2014)
- Susanne Bobzien (born 1960)
- Samantha Brennan (fl. 1997)
- Janet Broughton (fl. 2014)
- Kimberley Brownlee (born 1978)
- Teresa Blankmeyer Burke (fl. 2014)
- Inga Bostad (born 1963), philosopher and educator
- Giannina Braschi (born 1953)
- Judith Butler (born 1956)
- Mary Whiton Calkins (1863–1930)^{W}
- Joan Callahan (professor emerita, 2011)
- Agnes Callard (born 1976)
- Elisabeth Camp (fl. 2014)
- Victoria Camps (1941)
- Claudia Card (1940–2015)
- Nancy Cartwright (born 1944)^{O}
- Barbara Cassin (born 1947)
- Ruth Chang (fl. 2014)
- Patricia Churchland (born 1943)^{C}
- Hélène Cixous (born 1937)^{R}
- Lorraine Code (born 1937)
- Joyce Mitchell Cook (1933–2014)
- Megan Craig
- Alice Crary (fl. 2014)
- Ann Cudd (fl. 2014)
- Chris Cuomo (fl. 2014)
- Izydora Dąmbska (1904–1983)
- Peggy DesAutels (fl. 2014)
- Penelope Deutscher (fl. 2014)
- Daisy Dixon (born 1989)
- Heather Douglas (born 1969)
- Helene von Druskowitz (1856–1918)
- Raya Dunayevskaya (1910–1987)
- Divya Dwivedi
- Dorothy Edgington (born 1941)
- Frances Egan (fl. 2014)
- Dorothy Emmet (1904–2000)
- Cécile Fabre (born 1971)
- Carla Fehr (fl. 2014)
- Carrie Figdor (fl. 2014)
- Gail Fine (fl. 2014)
- Juliet Floyd (fl. 2014)
- Philippa Foot (1920–2010)^{W} ^{C} ^{O}
- Nancy Fraser (born 1947)
- Miranda Fricker (born 1966)
- Marilyn Frye (born 1941)
- Ann Garry (fl. 2014)
- Tamar Gendler (born 1965)
- Margaret Gilbert (born 1942)
- Mary Louise Gill (fl. 2014)
- Kathryn Gines (fl. 2014)
- Lydia Goehr (fl. 2014)
- Rebecca Goldstein (born 1950)
- Ana Marta González (born 1969)
- Patricia Greenspan (fl. 2014)
- Celia Green (born 1935)
- Germaine Greer (born 1939)
- Marjorie Grene (1910–2009)
- Susan Haack (1945-2026)^{W}
- Ruth Hagengruber (born 1958)
- Käte Hamburger (1896–1992), literary scholar
- Donna Haraway (born 1944)
- Sandra Harding (1935–2025), feminist
- Sally Haslanger (fl. 2014)
- Jane Heal (born 1946)
- Virginia Held (born 1929)
- Ágnes Heller (1929–2019)
- Jeanne Hersch (1910–2000)
- Mary Hesse (1924–2016)
- Pamela Hieronymi (fl. 2014)
- Jennifer Hornsby (born 1951)^{O}
- Susan Hurley (1954–2007)
- Rosalind Hursthouse (born 1943)
- Luce Irigaray (born 1930)^{C} ^{O} ^{R}
- Jenann Ismael (fl. 2014)
- Alison Jaggar (fl. 2014)
- Susan James (born 1951)
- Carrie Ichikawa Jenkins (fl. 2014)
- Barbara Johnson (1947–2009)
- Evelyn Fox Keller (1936–2023)
- Patricia Kitcher (born 1948)
- Eva Kittay (fl. 2014)
- Martha Klein (retired 2006)
- Martha Kneale (1909–2001)
- Helen Knight (1899–1984)
- Sarah Kofman (1934–1994)
- Christine Korsgaard (born 1952)
- Julia Kristeva (born 1941)^{C} ^{O} ^{R}
- İoanna Kuçuradi (born 1936)
- Jennifer Lackey (fl. 2014)
- Susanne Langer (1895–1985)^{O} ^{R} ^{W}
- Rae Langton (born 1961)
- Thelma Z. Lavine (1915–2011)
- Michèle Le Dœuff (born 1948)^{O} ^{R}
- Hilde Lindemann (fl. 2014)
- Genevieve Lloyd (born 1941)
- Elisabeth Lloyd
- Sharon Lloyd (fl. 2014)
- Helen Longino (born 1944)
- Béatrice Longuenesse (born 1950)
- Penelope Maddy (born 1950)
- Kate Manne (born 1983)
- Ruth Barcan Marcus (1921–2012)^{C} ^{O}
- Raïssa Maritain (1883–1960)
- Noëlle McAfee (fl. 2014)
- Alison McIntyre (fl. 2014)
- Margaret MacDonald (1907–1956)
- Fiona Macpherson (born 1971)
- Mary Kate McGowan (fl. 2014)
- Susan Mendus (born 1951)
- Christia Mercer (fl. 2014)
- Mary Midgley (1919–2018)^{W}
- Ruth Millikan (born 1933)^{O}
- Cheryl Misak (born 1961)
- Michele Moody-Adams
- Iris Murdoch (1919–1999)^{O} ^{W}
- Nancey Murphy (born 1951)
- Constance Naden (1858–1889), poet and philosopher
- Jennifer Nagel (graduated 1990)
- Uma Narayan (born 1958), Indian postcolonial feminist
- Susan Neiman (born 1955)
- Karen Ng, professor of philosophy at Vanderbilt University
- Nel Noddings (1929–2022)
- Kathryn Norlock (born 1969)
- Kathleen Nott (1905–1999)
- Martha Nussbaum (born 1947)^{C} ^{O}
- Hilda D. Oakeley (1867–1950)
- Cailin O'Connor (born 1983)
- Peg O'Connor (born 1965)
- Kelly Oliver (born 1958)
- Onora O'Neill (born 1941)^{O} ^{W}
- Maria Ossowska (1896–1974)
- Adrian Piper (born 1948)
- Ayn Rand (1905–1982)
- Janet Radcliffe Richards (born 1944)^{O}
- Rosemary Radford Ruether (1936–2022)
- Kate Raworth (born 1970)
- Yvanka B. Raynova (born 1959)
- Helena Roerich (1879–1955)
- Amélie Rorty (1932–2020)
- Gillian Rose (1947-1995)
- Renata Salecl (born 1962)
- Debra Satz (fl. 2015)
- Jennifer Saul (fl. 2014)
- Susanna Schellenberg (born 1974)
- Naomi Scheman (fl. 2014)
- Londa Schiebinger (born 1952), feminist
- Sally Scholz (born 1968)
- Ofelia Schutte (professor emerita, 2012)
- Lisa H. Schwartzman (born 1969)
- Gila Sher (fl. 2014)
- Nancy Sherman (fl. 2014)
- Seana Shiffrin (fl. 2014)
- Vandana Shiva (born 1952), feminist
- Laurie Shrage (born 1953)
- Susanna Siegel (fl. 2014)
- Alison Simmons (born 1965)
- May Gorslin Preston Slosson (1858–1943)
- Dorothy Smith (1926–2022)
- Holly Martin Smith (fl. 2014)
- Nancy Snow (fl. 2014)
- Miriam Solomon (fl. 2014)
- Gayatri Chakravorty Spivak (born 1942)
- Susanne Sreedhar (fl. 2014)
- Amia Srinivasan (born 1984)
- Susan Stebbing (1885–1943)^{W}
- Edith Stein (1891–1942), pedagogue^{D1}
- Isabelle Stengers (born 1949)
- Kathleen Stock (born 1971)
- Helene Stöcker (1869–1943), feminist, sexual reformer
- Alison Stone (born 1972)
- Eleonore Stump (born 1947), analytic thomist
- Anita Superson (fl. 2014)
- Lisa Tessman
- Amie Thomasson (born 1968)
- Judith Jarvis Thomson (1929–2020)^{W} ^{C} ^{O}
- Valerie Tiberius (fl. 2014)
- Lynne Tirrell (fl. 2014)
- Margaret Urban Walker (fl. 2014)
- Georgia Warnke (fl. 2014)
- Mary Warnock, Baroness Warnock (1924–2019)^{O}
- Simone Weil (1909–1943), critical marxist^{C} ^{D1} ^{O} ^{R}
- Helene Weiss, German and British classical philosopher
- Elsie Whetnall (1897–c.1998)
- Rebecca Whisnant
- Jennifer Whiting (fl. 2014)
- Jessica Wilson (fl. 2014)
- Margaret Dauler Wilson (1939–1998)
- Charlotte Witt (born 1951)
- Monique Wittig (1935–2003)
- Susan Wolf (born 1952)
- Ursula Wolf (born 1951)
- Dorothy Maud Wrinch (1894–1976)
- Alison Wylie (born 1954)
- Naomi Zack (fl. 2014)
- Linda Trinkaus Zagzebski (born 1946)
- María Zambrano (1904–1991)
- Ewa Ziarek (fl. 2014)
- Alenka Zupančič (born 1966)
- Jan Zwicky (born 1955)

== Alphabetically ==
=== A ===
- Felicia Nimue Ackerman (fl. 2014)
- Marilyn McCord Adams (1943–2017)^{O}
- Jane Addams (1860–1935)
- Aedesia of Alexandria (5th century AD)
- Alia Al-Saji (fl. 2014)
- Lilli Alanen (1941–2021)
- Linda Martín Alcoff (born 1955)
- Amy Allen (fl. 2014)
- Alice Ambrose (1906–2001)
- Elizabeth Anderson (born 1959)
- Lou Andreas-Salomé (1861–1937)
- Rachel Ankeny
- Julia Annas (born 1946)
- G. E. M. Anscombe (1919–2001)^{C} ^{O} ^{R} ^{W}
- Louise Antony (fl. 2014)

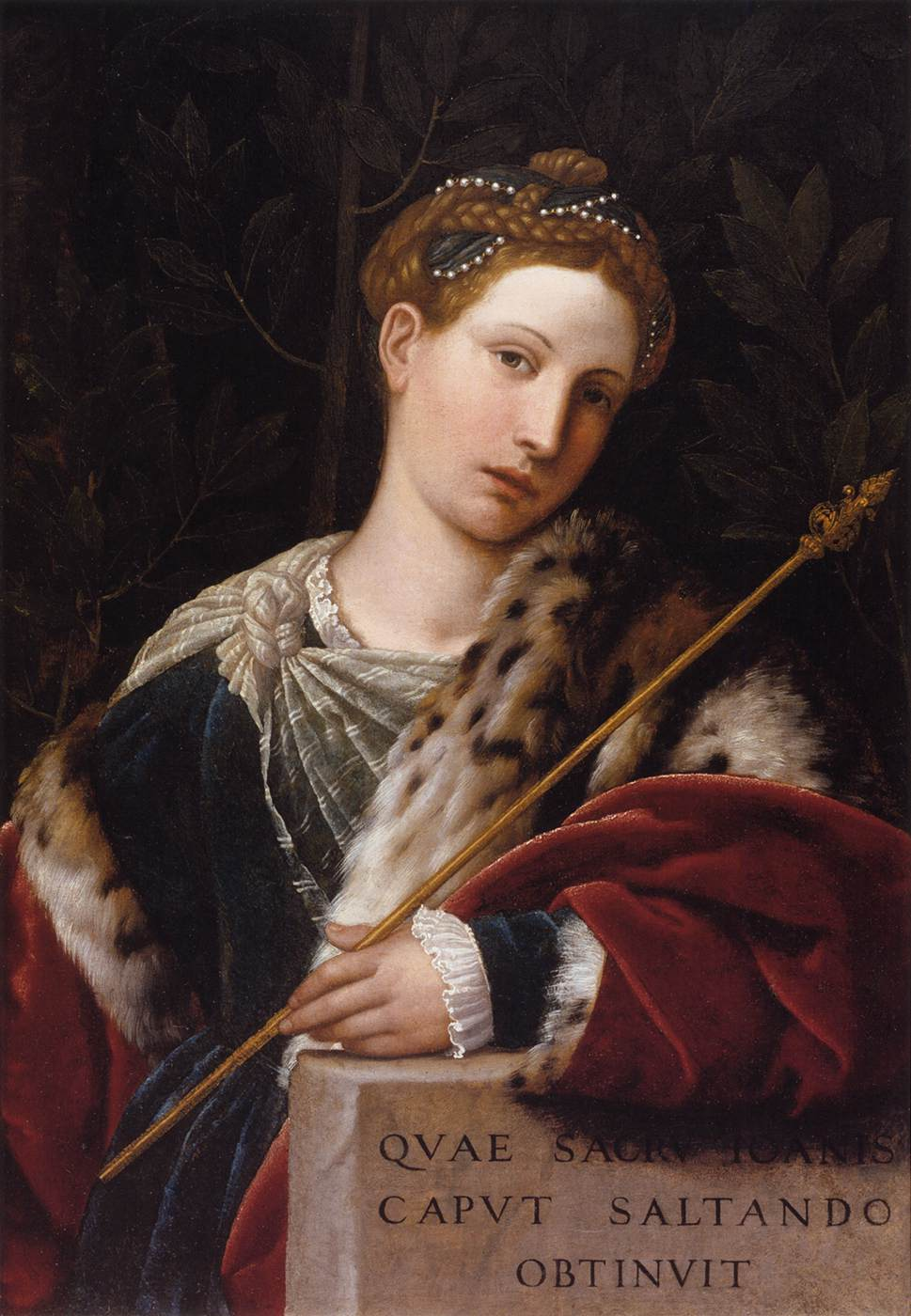
Portrait of Tullia d'Aragona

- Tullia d'Aragona (c. 1510–1556)
- Hannah Arendt (1906–1975), political theorist^{C} ^{O} ^{R} ^{W}
- Arete of Cyrene (4th century BC)
- Nomy Arpaly (fl. 2014)
- Aspasia of Miletus (approx. 470–400 BC)
- Mary Astell (1666–1731)^{A} ^{B} ^{C} ^{D1} ^{D2} ^{R}
- Margaret Atherton (unknown)
- Anita Avramides (born 1952)

=== B ===
- Babette Babich (born 1956)
- Annette Baier (1929–2012)^{O}
- Ann-Sophie Barwich
- Ban Zhao (c. 35–100)^{D2}
- Marcia Baron (fl. 2014)
- Laura Bassi (1711–1778), philosopher and physicist
- Nancy Bauer (born 1960)
- Simone de Beauvoir (1908–1986), author, feminist^{D1} ^{O} ^{R} ^{W}
- Helen Beebee (fl. 2014)
- Seyla Benhabib (born 1950)
- Peg Birmingham (fl. 2014)
- Helena Blavatsky (1831–1891)
- Susanne Bobzien (born 1960)
- Inga Bostad (born 1963), Norwegian philosopher and educator
- Tina Fernandes Botts (fl. 2014)
- Anna Brackett (1836–1911)
- Janet Broughton (fl. 2014)

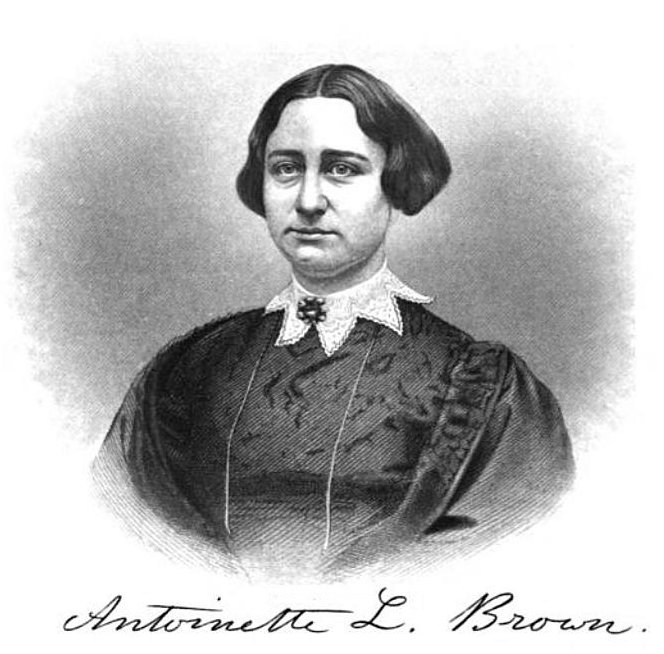
Antoinette Brown

- Antoinette Brown Blackwell (1825–1921)^{D2}
- Teresa Blankmeyer Burke (fl. 2014)
- Judith Butler (born 1956)

=== C ===
- Ella Lyman Cabot (1866–1934)
- Mary Whiton Calkins (1863–1930)^{W}
- Joan Callahan (professor emerita, 2011)
- Agnes Callard (born 1976)
- Elisabeth Camp (fl. 2014)
- Claudia Card (1940–2015)
- Nancy Cartwright (born 1944)^{O}
- Barbara Cassin (born 1947)
- Catherine of Alexandria (282–305)
- Catherine of Siena (1347–1380)
- Margaret Cavendish (1623–1673)^{A} ^{B} ^{C} ^{R}
- Ruth Chang (fl. 2014)
- Émilie du Châtelet (1706–1749)^{R}
- Marilena de Souza Chaui (born 1941)
- Patricia Churchland (born 1943)^{C}
- Hélène Cixous (born 1937)^{R}
- Frances Power Cobbe (1822–1904)
- Catharine Trotter Cockburn (1679–1749)^{A} ^{B} ^{C} ^{R} ^{W}
- Lorraine Code (born 1937)
- Hedwig Conrad-Martius (1888–1966)
- Anne Conway (1631–1679)^{A} ^{B} ^{C} ^{D1} ^{O} ^{R} ^{W}
- Joyce Mitchell Cook (1933–2014)
- Alice Crary (fl. 2014)
- Ann Cudd (fl. 2014)
- Chris Cuomo (fl. 2014)

=== D ===
- pl:Izydora Dąmbska (1904–1983)
- Peggy DesAutels (fl. 2014)
- Penelope Deutscher (fl. 2014)
- Diotima of Mantinea (appears in Plato's Symposium)
- Helene von Druskowitz (1856–1918)
- Raya Dunayevskaya (1910–1987)
- Divya Dwivedi

=== E ===
- Dorothy Edgington (born 1941)
- Frances Egan (fl. 2014)
- George Eliot (1819–1880)^{G} ^{R}
- Elisabeth of Bohemia (1618–1680)^{A} ^{B} ^{C} ^{R}
- Dorothy Emmet (1904–2000)

=== F ===
- Carla Fehr (fl. 2014)
- Carrie Figdor (fl. 2014)
- Gail Fine (fl. 2014)
- Juliet Floyd (fl. 2014)
- Moderata Fonte (1555–1592), feminist
- Philippa Foot (1920–2010)^{W} ^{C} ^{O}
- Nancy Fraser (born 1947)
- Marilyn Frye (born 1941)

=== G ===
- Ann Garry (fl. 2014)
- Tamar Gendler (born 1965)
- Margaret Gilbert (born 1942)
- Mary Louise Gill (fl. 2014)
- Charlotte Perkins Gilman (1860–1935)
- Kathryn Gines (fl. 2014)
- Hannah Ginsborg (born 1958)
- Lydia Goehr (fl. 2014)
- Emma Goldman (1869–1940)
- Rebecca Goldstein (born 1950)
- Alison Gopnik (born 1955), psychologist, philosopher of mind
- Olympe de Gouges (1748–1793), women's rights activist
- Marie de Gournay (1565–1645), protofeminist, translator^{D2}
- Celia Green (born 1935)
- Patricia Greenspan (fl. 2014)
- Germaine Greer (born 1939)
- Marjorie Grene (1910–2009)
- Cynthia M. Grund (born 1956), educator

=== H ===
- Susan Haack (born 1945)^{W}
- Ruth Hagengruber (born 1958)
- Käte Hamburger (1896–1992), literary scholar
- Donna Haraway (born 1944)
- Sandra Harding (1935–2025), feminist
- Marjorie Silliman Harris (1890–1976)
- Sally Haslanger (fl. 2014)
- Amalie J. Hathaway
- Jane Heal (born 1946)
- Virginia Held (born 1929)
- Ágnes Heller (1929–2019)
- Heloise (1085–1162)^{D2}
- Grete Hermann (1901–1984)
- Jeanne Hersch (1910–2000)
- Mary Hesse (1924–2016)
- Pamela Hieronymi (fl. 2014)
- Hildegard of Bingen (1098–1179), German abbess, composer, and philosopher.^{D1} ^{R}
- Hipparchia from Thrakien (approx 325 BC), Cynic philosopher, wife of Crates of Thebes
- Jennifer Hornsby (born 1951)^{O}
- Susan Hurley (1954–2007)
- Rosalind Hursthouse (fl. 2014)
- Hypatia of Alexandria (370–415) Greek Alexandrian Neoplatonist philosopher, mathematician^{C} ^{R}

=== I ===
- Luce Irigaray (born 1930)^{C} ^{O} ^{R}
- Jenann Ismael (fl. 2014)
- Carrie Ichikawa Jenkins (fl. 2014)

=== J ===
- Rahel Jaeggi (born 1967)
- Alison Jaggar (born 1942)
- Barbara Johnson (1947–2009)
- Dorthe Jørgensen (born 1959), Danish philosopher and educator, first Danish woman to be awarded an honorary DPhil
- Sor Juana (1648–1695)^{D2}
- Constance Jones (1848–1922)

=== K ===
- Evelyn Fox Keller (1936–2023)
- Marietta Kies (1853–1899)
- Patricia Kitcher (born 1948)
- Eva Kittay (fl. 2014)
- Martha Klein (retired 2006)
- Martha Kneale (1909–2001)
- Helen Knight (1899–1984)
- Sarah Kofman (1934–1994)
- Christine Korsgaard (born 1952)
- Julia Kristeva (born 1941)^{C} ^{O} ^{R}
- İoanna Kuçuradi (born 1936)

=== L ===
- Jennifer Lackey (fl. 2014)
- Susanne Langer (1895–1985)^{O} ^{R} ^{W}
- Rae Helen Langton (born 1961)
- Thelma Z. Lavine (1915–2011)
- Michèle Le Dœuff (born 1948)^{O} ^{R}
- Vernon Lee (1856–1935)
- Sabina Leonelli
- Leontion (approx 300 BC), Epicurean
- Hilde Lindemann (fl. 2014)
- Genevieve Lloyd (born 1941)
- Sharon Lloyd (fl. 2014)
- Elisabeth Lloyd
- Helen Longino (born 1944)
- Béatrice Longuenesse (born 1950)
- Rosa Luxemburg (1871–1919), anti-militarist, marxist^{R}

=== M ===
- Catharine Macaulay (1731–1791)^{G}
- Fiona Macpherson (born 1971)
- Penelope Maddy (born 1950)
- Raïssa Maritain (1883–1960)
- Ruth Barcan Marcus (1921–2012)^{C} ^{O}
- Harriet Martineau (1802–1876)^{R} ^{W}
- Mary the Jewess (?1st–3rd century AD), alchemist
- Damaris Cudworth Masham (1659–1708)^{A} ^{B} ^{C} ^{R}
- Noëlle McAfee (fl. 2014)
- Alison McIntyre (fl. 2014)
- Margaret MacDonald (1907–1956)
- Mary Kate McGowan (fl. 2014)
- Mechthild of Magdeburg (1210–1285)^{G}
- Harriet Martineau (1802–1876)
- Melissa (3rd century BC)
- Susan Mendus (born 1951)
- Christia Mercer (fl. 2014)
- Mary Midgley (1919–2018)^{W}
- Ruth Millikan (born 1933)^{O}
- Cheryl Misak (born 1961)
- Ellen Mitchell (1838–1920)
- Michele Moody-Adams
- Michele Moses
- Iris Murdoch (1919–1999)^{O} ^{W}
- Nancey Murphy (born 1951)
- Judith Sargent Murray (1751–1820)^{D2}

=== N ===
- Constance Naden (1858–1889)
- Uma Narayan (born 1958)
- Susan Neiman (born 1955)
- Cynthia Nielsen (born 1970)
- Nel Noddings (1929–2022)
- Kathryn Norlock (born 1969)
- Kathleen Nott (1905–1999)
- Martha Nussbaum (born 1947)^{C} ^{O}

=== O ===
- Hilda D. Oakeley (1867–1950)
- Cailin O'Connor (born 1983)
- Peg O'Connor (born 1965)
- Kelly Oliver (born 1958)
- Sophie Bosẹde Oluwọle (1935–2018)
- Onora O'Neill (born 1941)^{O} ^{W}
- Maria Ossowska, (1896–1974)
- de:M. A. C. Otto (1918–2005)

=== P ===
- Adrian Piper (born 1948)
- Christine de Pizan (c. 1365–c. 1430)^{G} ^{R}
- Olga Plümacher (1839–1895)

=== R ===
- Maria Rakhmaninova (born 1985)
- Ayn Rand (1905–1982)
- Janet Radcliffe Richards (born 1944)^{O}
- Rosemary Radford Ruether (1936–2022)
- Yvanka B. Raynova (born 1959)
- Helena Roerich (1879–1955)
- Avital Ronell (born 1952)
- Amélie Rorty (1932–2020)

=== S ===
- Renata Salecl (born 1962)
- Debra Satz (fl. 2015)
- Jennifer Saul (fl. 2014)
- Ruth L. Saw (1901–1986)
- Susanna Schellenberg (born 1974)
- Naomi Scheman (fl. 2014)
- Londa Schiebinger (born 1952), feminist
- Sally Scholz (born 1968)
- Anna Maria van Schurman (1607–1678)^{D2} ^{R}
- Ofelia Schutte (professor emerita, 2012)
- Lisa H. Schwartzman (born 1969)
- Sally Sedgwick
- Lady Mary Shepherd (1777–1847)^{A} ^{C}
- Gila Sher (fl. 2014)
- Nancy Sherman (fl. 2014)
- Susan Sherwin (born 1947), feminist
- Seana Shiffrin (fl. 2014)
- Vandana Shiva (born 1952), feminist
- Laurie Shrage (born 1953)
- Susanna Siegel (fl. 2014)
- Alison Simmons (born 1965)
- May Gorslin Preston Slosson (1858–1943)
- Dorothy Smith (1926–2022)
- Holly Martin Smith (fl. 2014)
- Nancy Snow (fl. 2014)
- Miriam Solomon (fl. 2014)
- Gayatri Chakravorty Spivak (born 1942)
- Susanne Sreedhar (fl. 2014)
- Amia Srinivasan (born 1984)
- Germaine de Staël (1766–1817)^{R}
- Susan Stebbing (1885–1943)^{W}
- Edith Stein (1891–1942), pedagogue^{D1}
- Kathleen Stock (born 1971)
- Helene Stöcker (1869–1943), feminist, sexual reformer
- Eleonore Stump (born 1947), analytic thomist
- Gabrielle Suchon (1631–1703)^{R}
- Anita Superson (fl. 2014)
- Alison Stone (born 1972)
- Bertha von Suttner (1843–1914)

=== T ===
- Agnes Taubert (1844–1877)
- Harriet Taylor Mill (1807–1858)^{C} ^{D1} ^{R}
- Teresa of Ávila (1515–1582)^{C}
- Theano (late 6th century BC)
- Themistoclea (fl. 6th century BC) Teacher of Pythagoras
- Judith Jarvis Thomson (1929–2020)^{W} ^{C} ^{O}
- Valerie Tiberius (fl. 2014)
- Lynne Tirrell (fl. 2014)

=== V ===
- Gargi Vachaknavi, ancient Indian philosopher
- Josina Carolina van Lynden (1717–1791), first female Dutch philosopher who wrote a book about logic

=== W ===
- Margaret Urban Walker (fl. 2014)
- Georgia Warnke (fl. 2014)
- Mary Warnock, Baroness Warnock (1924–2019)^{O}
- Simone Weil (1909–1943), critical marxist^{C} ^{D1} ^{O} ^{R}
- Victoria, Lady Welby (1837–1912)^{W}
- Elsie Whetnall (1897–c.1998)
- Rebecca Whisnant
- Jennifer Whiting (fl. 2014)
- Jessica Wilson (fl. 2014)
- Margaret Dauler Wilson (1939–1998)
- Charlotte Witt (born 1951)
- Monique Wittig (1935–2003)
- Susan Wolf (born 1952)
- Ursula Wolf (born 1951)
- Mary Wollstonecraft, women's rights activist (1759–1797)^{C} ^{D1} ^{G} ^{O} ^{R} ^{W}
- Frances Wright (1795–1852)^{D2}
- Dorothy Maud Wrinch (1894–1976)
- Alison Wylie (born 1954)

=== Z ===
- Naomi Zack (fl. 2014)
- Linda Trinkaus Zagzebski (born 1946)
- María Zambrano (1904-1991)
- Ewa Ziarek (fl. 2014)
- Alenka Zupančič (born 1966)

== Notes ==
- ^A – For more information about this person's contribution to philosophy see her entry in Margaret Atherton's Women Philosophers of the Early Modern Period. Hackett; 1994. ISBN 0-87220-259-3
- ^B – For more information about this person's contribution to philosophy see her entry in Jacqueline Broad's Women Philosophers of the Seventeenth Century. Cambridge; 2003. ISBN 0-521-81295-X
- ^C – For more information about this person's contribution to philosophy see her entry in The Cambridge Dictionary of Philosophy. Cambridge University Press; 1999. ISBN 0-521-63722-8
- ^D1 – For more information about this person's contribution to philosophy see her entry in Jane Duran's Eight Women Philosophers: Theory Politics and Feminism. University of Illinois Press; 2006. ISBN 0-252-03022-2
- ^D2 – For more information about this person's contribution to philosophy see her entry in Therese Boos Dykeman's The Neglected Canon: Nine Women Philosophers – First to the Twentieth Century. Kluwer; 1999. ISBN 0-7923-5956-9
- ^G – For more information about this person's contribution to philosophy see her entry in Catherine Villanueva Gardner's Women Philosophers. Westview; 2003. ISBN 0-8133-4133-7 (paperback); ISBN 0-8133-6610-0 (hardcover)
- ^O – For more information about this person's contribution to philosophy see her entry in The Oxford Companion to Philosophy. Oxford University Press; 1995. ISBN 0-19-866132-0
- ^R – For more information about this person's contribution to philosophy see her entry in the Concise Routledge Encyclopedia of Philosophy. Routledge; 2000. ISBN 0-415-22364-4
- ^W – For more information about this person's contribution to philosophy see her entry in Mary Warnock's Women Philosophers. J.M. Dent; 1996. ISBN 0-460-87721-6
