= Whetnall =

Whetnall is a surname. Notable people with the surname include:

- Edith Whetnall (1910–1965), ear, nose, and throat surgeon
- Elsie Whetnall (1897–c. 1998), British philosopher
- Paul Whetnall (1947–2014), English badminton player, husband of Susan
- Susan Whetnall (born 1942), English badminton player
