= Georgia Warnke =

American philosopher

- Born: 1951 (age 74–75)

Education
- Education: Reed College; Boston University

Philosophical work
- Institutions: UC Riverside
- Main interests: Critical theory, hermeneutics

Georgia Warnke (born 1951) is an American philosopher who is a Distinguished Professor of Political Science (and formerly Distinguished Professor of Philosophy) and the Director of the Center for Ideas & Society at the University of California, Riverside. She chaired the Department from 2002 to 2004. She also acted as the Associate Dean for Arts and Humanities, College of Humanities, Arts and Social Sciences at UCR from 2006 to 2011.

== Education and career ==
Warnke received a bachelor's degree from Reed College in 1973. She went on to receive a master's degree from Boston University in 1978, and a doctorate, also from Boston University, in 1982.

Prior to her current appointment, Warnke held an appointment as Assistant Professor of Philosophy at Yale University from 1982 to 1988, being promoted to Associate Professor in 1988, and staying until 1991 when she moved to Riverside. Besides her main appointment in the Philosophy and Political Science Departments, Warnke also held an additional appointment as a Professor of Women's Studies at UCR between 2001 and 2004. Throughout these appointments, she has also served in a variety of roles within her departments, in UCR's Academic Senate, and in the American Philosophical Association.

== Research areas ==
Warnke's research centers on hermeneutics, critical theory, political theory, and feminism. She has written extensively about the works of Jürgen Habermas, Richard Rorty, Hans-Georg Gadamer, and other hermeneutics-oriented philosophers. More recently, she has critically examined issues of identity, especially issues of race and gender identity.

== Publications ==
Warnke has published four books (many with multiple editions); Gadamer: Hermeneutics, Tradition, and Reason in 1987, Justice and Interpretation in 1993, Legitimate Differences: Interpretation in the Abortion Controversy and Other Public Debates in 1999, and After Identity: Rethinking Race, Sex, and Gender in 2007. She has also written a number of book chapters, peer-reviewed journal articles, and encyclopedia articles, including pieces in Inquiry: An Interdisciplinary Journal of Philosophy, Hypatia: A Journal of Feminist Philosophy, Dissent, Philosophy & Social Criticism, the Journal of Social Philosophy, the Encyclopedia of Ethics, A Companion to Metaphysics, and the Companion to the Philosophers among many others.

Warnke is a member of the editorial board of Hypatia: A Journal of Feminist Philosophy. Her term started in 2000.

=== After Identity ===
In After Identity, Warnke suggested that racial, gender, sexual, and other identities are lenses through which people view the nature of themselves or others and that, just as is the case with the interpretation of art, no single identity is uniquely correct or complete - i.e., no one's perceived identity holds unique or whole truth, and some identities may be meaningless in contexts other than that in which they were conceived. Warnke frames many of her gender-identity based arguments throughout the book using the case study of Bruce Reimer, someone who lost his penis shortly after birth during a mangled circumcision, and, having been brought up as a girl, rebelled against that identity, and extends the conclusions she draws from these arguments to questions of racial identity.
