= Alia Al-Saji =

Philosophy professor

Philosophical work
- Institutions: McGill University, Emory University
- Main interests: Phenomenology, Feminist Philosophy, Critical Race Theory, Black Studies, Decoloniality, Continental Philosophy

Alia Al-Saji is a James McGill Professor of Philosophy at McGill University. Her work focuses on bringing 20th century phenomenology and French philosophy into dialogue with critical race and feminist theories. Al-Saji believes that feminist phenomenology must take an intersectional approach to its work, one that accounts for the fact that gender cannot be treated in a vacuum apart from other axes of oppression. Born in Iraq, Al-Saji spent her youth in Baghdad, Great Britain, and Kuwaït before moving to Canada in 1988.

== Education and career ==
Al-Saji received a bachelor's degree from McMaster University in 1993, a master's degree in philosophy from KU Leuven in 1995, and a doctorate in philosophy from Emory University in 2002. After receiving her doctorate, Al-Saji accepted a teaching position at McGill University. Throughout her time at McGill (and previously, as a graduate student), Al-Saji published a number of papers in peer-reviewed journals. She is currently working on a monograph tentatively titled Hesitation: Critical Phenomenology, Colonial Duration, and the Affective Weight of the Past.

Al-Saji is the editor of the feminist philosophy section of the journal Philosophy Compass. She is a co-editor of the Symposia on Gender, Race and Philosophy. Al-Saji has held a number of fellowships, including one at the Institute of Advanced Study at Durham University in 2012, where she carried out research related to the theme of time, and one at the Camargo Foundation in Cassis, France.

== Research areas ==
Much of Al-Saji's work has forged links between 20th century phenomenology, French philosophy, and critical race feminist theories. A significant theme of her work has explored the question of time. Al-Saji's research has two distinct tracks: the first looks at questions of embodiment, memory, and intersubjectivity, and the second attempts to develop a phenomenology of "cultural racism," especially through feminist analysis of the depiction of Muslim women in modern western contexts. Al-Saji's work primarily engages with the philosophies of Frantz Fanon, Henri Bergson, Edmund Husserl, and Maurice Merleau-Ponty.
