= Marcia Baron =

American philosophy professor (born 1955)

- Born: 1955 (age 70–71)

Philosophical work
- Institutions: Indiana University Bloomington, University of St. Andrews, University of Illinois at Urbana-Champaign, Virginia Polytechnic Institute and State University, University of North Carolina, Illinois State University, Stanford University, University of Michigan, University of Chicago, University of Melbourne, University of Auckland, Dartmouth College
- Main interests: Moral philosophy, moral psychology, philosophy of law

Marcia Baron (born 1955) is an American philosopher and the Rudy Professor of Philosophy at Indiana University Bloomington. Her main research interests include moral philosophy, moral psychology, and philosophical issues in criminal law. Baron is an associate editor of Inquiry, a member of the editorial board of The International Encyclopedia of Ethics, a series editor for New Directions in Ethics, and a member of the editorial board of the North American Kant Studies in Philosophy.

== Education and career ==
Baron received her baccalaureate from Oberlin College in 1976, and went on to receive a master's and doctoral degree from the University of North Carolina in 1978 and 1982, respectively. After receiving her doctorate, Baron accepted an appointment as an assistant professor at the Virginia Polytechnic Institute and State University and an appointment as a Visiting Assistant Professor at the University of Illinois at Urbana-Champaign. She accepted a permanent offer from UIUC in 1983, was promoted to Associate Professor in 1989, and to full Professor in 1996. In 2001, she moved to Indiana University - Bloomington as a full professor, and she was named the Rudy Professor in 2004. In 2012 she accepted an additional appointment as Professor at the University of St. Andrews, while retaining her position at Indiana as well. She retains an honorary professorship there. Besides for her permanent positions, Baron has also held visiting positions at a variety of institutions, including Illinois State University, Stanford University, the University of Michigan, the University of Chicago, the University of Melbourne, the University of Auckland, and Dartmouth College.

== Research areas ==
Baron's research has focused on moral philosophy, moral psychology, the philosophical issues of criminal law, impartiality in ethics, as well as Immanuel Kant (whom she has authored two books on) and David Hume. Baron has written extensively about topics such as apparent conflicts between different types of interpersonal relationships, manipulativeness, justifications and excuses, the moral significance of appearances, and the ethics of Kant and Hume. She has also written about a wide variety of topics related to philosophical issues of criminal law, including writing several papers on potential defenses to bodily crimes, issues surrounding mens rea (including whether or not mens rea can be satisfied by negligence,) and the standards of control and reasonableness that people should be held to (cf. the "reasonable person".)

== Publications ==
Baron has written or co-written two books and is working on a third – Three Methods of Ethics: A Debate in 1997, and Kantian Ethics Almost without Apology in 1995. Baron's upcoming book, tentatively titled Self-Defense, Reason, and the Law, focuses on the reasonable belief requirement as it pertains to self-defense. She has also published around four dozen papers, one monograph, five encyclopedia articles, and a host of book reviews. In Three Methods of Ethics, Baron's contribution focused providing a limited defense of Immanuel Kant, attempting to demonstrate that a Kantian position is superior to that espoused by virtue ethicists. In Kantian Ethics, Baron attempts to provide a limited defense of Kantian ethics intended for a broader audience than those who are already Kantians. Kantian Ethics tries to directly address two widely perceived problems in Kant's positions; first, the idea that Kant's ethics leave no room for superogatory actions, and second, that Kant places too much emphasis on the idea of duty.
