= Peg O'Connor =

American philosopher

- Born: Margaret O'Connor; United States

Philosophical work
- Institutions: Gustavus Adolphus College, University of Connecticut, Moorhead State University, University of Minnesota
- Main interests: Feminist philosophy, moral philosophy, Wittgenstein, addiction

Peg O'Connor, is a professor of Philosophy and Gender, Women, and Sexuality Studies as well as Chair of the Department of Philosophy at Gustavus Adolphus College. Her present research interests include two separate but intersecting strains: Wittgenstein's approach to ethics, and the philosophy of addiction. She also contributes to public discourse about her areas of interest through contributing to popular media, especially around philosophical issues surrounding addiction, and has actively spoken out about issues of gender equity facing the field of philosophy.

== Education and career ==
O'Connor earned her bachelor's degree from Wesleyan University in 1987, and her master's and doctorate in philosophy from the University of Minnesota in 1993 and 1996, respectively. Her doctoral thesis focused on Wittgensteinian moral realism. While pursuing her doctorate, O'Connor also acted as an instructor of philosophy at the University of Minnesota from 1994 to 1995, and an instructor of philosophy at Moorhead State University from 1995 to 1996. After completing her doctorate, O'Connor accepted a position as a visiting assistant professor of philosophy at Gustavus Adolphus College from 1996 to 1999, before accepting a position as assistant professor of women's studies at Gustavus Adolphus. She was promoted to associate professor in 2003 and to full professor in 2007, in both philosophy and women's, gender, and sexuality studies. O'Connor has also acted in several administrative capacities, including chair of the Philosophy Department in 2011, and director of the Women's Studies Program from 1999 to 2011.

== Research areas ==
O'Connor's research interests include two separate but intersecting strains: Wittgenstein's approach to ethics and the philosophy of addiction. She has also written extensively about issues involving gender equity and harassment, sexuality, abuse, and oppression.

== Publications ==
O'Connor has published two books and is working on a third. She has also edited two books, contributed several book and encyclopedia chapters, and published several journal articles.

O'Connor's first book, published in 2002, is Oppression and Responsibility: A Wittgensteinian Approach to Social Practices and Moral Theory. It draws on a primarily Wittgensteinian framework to articulate various forms of political oppression (focusing on forms she views as primarily invisible because their existence relies on rarely questioned assumptions) and to put forward a theory of moral responsibility. Her second book, published in 2008, is Morality and Our Complicated Form of Life: Feminist Wittgensteinian Metaethics. It opposes both realist and antirealist positions to metaethics, suggesting instead a Wittgensteinian approach that O'Connor calls "felted contextualism".

O'Connor's third book will explore issues of addiction and recovery through the lens of philosophy. In an interview about the book, she said: "Addicts are frequently very philosophical; we tend to be armchair thinkers. Addicts struggle with issues of self-identity, self-knowledge and self-deception, the nature of God, existential dilemmas, marking the line between appearance and reality, free will and voluntariness, and moral responsibility. These are prompted by acute instances of self-examination and reflection about how to live well."

O'Connor also maintains a blog on Psychology Today that deals with the philosophy of addiction, contributes to the New York Times's Opinionator and The Stone blogs about similar topics, and co-maintains the Stanford Encyclopedia of Philosophy's article about topics in feminism.

== Selected bibliography ==
=== Books ===
- O'Connor, Peg; Scheman, Naomi (2002). Feminist interpretations of Ludwig Wittgenstein. University Park, Pennsylvania: Pennsylvania State University Press. ISBN 9780271021980.
- O'Connor, Peg (2002). Oppression and responsibility a Wittgensteinian approach to social practices and moral theory. University Park, Pennsylvania: Pennsylvania State University Press. ISBN 9780271023465.
- O'Connor, Peg; Heldke, Lisa (2004). Oppression, privilege, and resistance: theoretical perspectives on racism, sexism, and heterosexism. Boston: McGraw-Hill. ISBN 9780072882438.
- O'Connor, Peg (2008). Morality and our complicated form of life: feminist Wittgensteinian metaethics. University Park, Pennsylvania: Pennsylvania State University Press. ISBN 9780271033808.
- O'Connor, Peg (2016). Life on the rocks: finding meaning in addiction and recovery. Las Vegas, NV: Central Recovery Press. ISBN 1942094027
