= Sharon Lloyd =

American philosopher

Sharon A. Lloyd

Philosophical work
- Institutions: University of Southern California, Harvard University, University of California, Los Angeles
- Main interests: Thomas Hobbes, history of moral and political philosophy, contemporary political philosophy, and feminist philosophy

Sharon A. Lloyd (born 1958) is Professor of Philosophy, Law, and Political Science at the University of Southern California. She co-founded the USC Center for Law and Philosophy, and directs the USC Levan Institute's Conversations in Practical Ethics Program. Lloyd's work, especially on the philosophy of Thomas Hobbes, has been considered some of the most significant work published in recent years.

== Education and career ==
Lloyd graduated summa cum laude and Phi Beta Kappa from the University of California, Los Angeles in 1981 where she studied with Philippa Foot and Rogers Albritton, and earned her PhD in philosophy from Harvard University in 1987, where she wrote her dissertation under John Rawls and T.M. Scanlon. She has taught at the University of Southern California since 1987. She has served as co-editor for Pacific Philosophical Quarterly and as Review Editor for Philosophy & Public Affairs.

== Philosophical work ==
Lloyd specializes in the history of moral and political philosophy, contemporary political philosophy, and feminist philosophy. One of the preeminent Hobbes scholars, Lloyd has authored two books on Hobbes--Morality in the Philosophy of Thomas Hobbes: Cases in the Law of Nature and Ideals as Interests in Hobbes's Leviathan: The Power of Mind over Matter—and edited three others. She has also written many peer-reviewed papers, as well as many articles, commentaries, and presentations on topics ranging from Hobbes and the application of Hobbesian ideas, to the philosophies of Machiavelli and John Stuart Mill, to contemporary liberalism and liberal feminist philosophy.

Her first book, Ideals as Interests in Hobbes's Leviathan: The Power of Mind over Matter, defends the controversial thesis that Hobbes was concerned with transcendent interests – interests that override the fear of death – not, as it is usually assumed, with the desire for self-preservation. Lloyd's second book, Morality in the Philosophy of Thomas Hobbes: Cases in the Law of Nature, was described by A.P. Martinich, writing in the Journal of the History of Philosophy, as one of the most significant books about Hobbes published in the last twenty five years.
