= Michèle Le Dœuff =

French philosopher

Michèle Le Dœuff (French: [lə dœf]; born 1948) is a French philosopher with a scholarly interest in the philosophy of Francis Bacon, and Sir Thomas More's utopianism.

She was born in Motreff.

== Philosophy ==
Le Dœuff questions the boundaries of philosophy, while insisting upon philosophy's importance (for example, in "Ants and Women"). She is critical of professional philosophers' neglectful attitude to science, and argues that disputes within sciences are often epistemological (that is, properly philosophical). In Hipparchia's Choice (1989) she questions philosophy's pretensions to being a unique practice which achieves a pure clarity: philosophy is inevitably shaped by language, metaphor, and power relations. According to Le Dœuff feminists make a special contribution. Their critique of gender categories in philosophy, science, and the humanities is empirical, philosophical, political, and interdisciplinary. Feminists see clearly how discourses are elevated to the status of 'philosophical' by a process in which social power is involved.

== Bibliography ==
- L'Étude et le rouet (1989), translated as Hipparchia's Choice: An Essay Concerning Women, Philosophy, Etc. by Trista Selous (1991)
- Le Sexe du savoir Michèle Le Dœuff (1998), translated as The Sex of Knowing by Kathryn Hamer and Lorraine Code(2003)
- Recherches sur l'imaginaire philosophique, translated as The Philosophical Imaginary by Colin Gordon (1990)
