= Carrie Figdor =

American philosopher

Philosophical work
- Institutions: University of Iowa, Claremont McKenna College
- Main interests: Philosophy of mind, metaphysics, ethics

Carrie Figdor is a professor of philosophy at the University of Iowa.

Her research focuses on the philosophy of mind, metaphysics, and ethics. Before pursuing a career in philosophy, Figdor was a journalist with the Associated Press for eleven years.

== Education and career ==
Figdor received a bachelor's degree in political science from Swarthmore College in 1981. She went on to receive a master's degree and doctorate in philosophy from the City University of New York Graduate Center in 1997 and 2005, respectively.

Before beginning her career in philosophy, Figdor served as a local correspondent in Caracas for The Wall Street Journal between 1986 and 1988. She also began to work for the Associated Press in 1986, where she served as a reporter and editor in various locations until 1997. While at the AP, she primarily reported on issues related to government, international relations, and society. After receiving her master's degree in philosophy, she accepted a position as an adjunct professor at the College of Staten Island, and later a position as adjunct professor at Rutgers University. After finishing her doctorate, she served as a visiting assistant professor in the Department of Philosophy and Religious Studies at Claremont McKenna College for two years, before accepting a permanent position as assistant professor in the Department of Philosophy and the Interdisciplinary Program in Cognitive Neuroscience at the University of Iowa in 2007, where she received tenure in 2013. (She also served as a visiting assistant professor at Duke University for a term.)

Outside of her university and journalistic work, Figdor is also a co-host of the New Books in Philosophy podcast, a member of the American Philosophical Association, the Society for Philosophy and Psychology (where she has served on the executive committee and co-chaired the Diversity Committee), the Southern Society for Philosophy and Psychology, and the Philosophy of Science Association.

== Research areas ==
Figdor's research revolves around issues involving the philosophy of mind, the philosophy of cognitive science, and neuroethics, with a secondary focus in media ethics and other issues related to journalism. Her current research focuses on mechanistic explanations for mind and metaphysics, as well as the practical implications of recent scientific findings for social relations. Figdor has suggested that the existence of objective news is theoretically possible, but that contemporary journalistic practices prevent it from being realized.

Apart from her primary interests, Figdor has taken a quantitative approach to examining the gender gap in philosophy as a field, finding that the stage of education where the gap grew the most was between those taking introductory philosophy courses and those pursuing undergraduate degrees in philosophy, finding further that the size of this gap was reduced in schools with a high proportion of women philosophy faculty.

Figdor's research has been recognized and disseminated through a series of invited talks at universities across the country. She, for instance, delivered a keynote speech at the 30th Boulder Conference on the History and Philosophy of Science in October 2014, a conference that addressed the historical and philosophical questions raised by cognitive neuroscience. Figdor also delivered a talk at Rice University in March 2014 on gender diversity in philosophy. In addition to these invited talks, Figdor also participated in a yearlong residency as a Scholar at the Center for Philosophy of Science at the University of Pittsburgh from fall 2013 until summer 2014.

== Publications ==
Figdor's professional philosophical work has been published in a number of refereed journals, including The Journal of Philosophy, Philosophy of Science, Neuroethics, and The Journal of Mass Media Ethics. She has also contributed a number of book chapters, including a chapter about the possibility of the existence of objective news, and a number about topics in the philosophy of mind. Figdor published a book on July 17, 2018, titled Pieces of Mind: The Proper Domain of Psychological Predicates. In this volume she aims to develop a theoretical foundation for scientific attempts to explain the relationship between the mind and the brain, focusing on the differences between processes and objects. It is billed as the "first book to examine how mathematical models provide an important new kind of evidence for mental capacities in nonhumans."

As a journalist for a wire service, Figdor's journalistic work was published in a wide variety of places.
