= Susan Mendus =

Welsh political philosopher (born 1951)

Susan Lesley "Sue" Mendus, CBE, FBA, FLSW (born 25 August 1951) is a Welsh academic specialising in political philosophy. She is currently Professor Emerita of Political Philosophy at the University of York. She was Vice-President (Social Sciences) of the British Academy between 2008 and 2012.

== Early life and education ==
Susan Coker was born on 25 August 1951 in Swansea, Wales, to John and Beryl Coker. She grew up in Waun Wen, Swansea, and was educated at Waun Wen Primary and Mynydd Bach schools.

She studied classics and philosophy at Aberystwyth University, graduating in 1973 with First Class Honours. After Aberystwyth she turned to Lady Margaret Hall, Oxford for a BPhil in 1975.

In 1977, Susan Coker married Andrew Mendus and assumed her married name.

== Academic career ==
In 1975, Mendus was appointed a lecturer in philosophy at the University of York. In 1986, she transferred to the Politics Department and was awarded the title Professor of Political Philosophy in 1995. Between 1995 and 2000, she was Director of the Morrell Studies in Toleration Programme at the University of York.

She is a member of the editorial boards of the British Journal of Political Science, the Journal of Philosophy of Education, and the Journal of Applied Philosophy.

Susan Mendus was called as an expert witness to the Leveson Inquiry of 2011–2012 into the culture, practices and ethics of the British press.

== Publications ==
- Toleration and the limits of liberalism (1989)
- Feminism and emotion: readings in moral and political philosophy (2000)
- Impartiality in moral and political philosophy (2002)
- Politics and morality (2009)

== Honours ==
Susan Mendus was elected a Fellow of the British Academy (FBA) in 2004. She is a Founding Fellow of the Learned Society of Wales (FLSW), which was launched in 2010. She was awarded an Honorary Fellowship from Swansea Metropolitan University in July 2012. In the 2013 New Year Honours, she was appointed Commander of the Order of the British Empire (CBE) "For services to Political Science".
