= Elisabeth Camp =

American philosopher

Education
- Education: University of Michigan, University of California, Berkeley,

Philosophical work
- Institutions: Harvard University, University of Pennsylvania, Rutgers University
- Main interests: Philosophy of mind, Philosophy of language, Aesthetics

Elisabeth Camp is a professor of philosophy at Rutgers University. Camp's work has focused on forms of thought and speech that do not fit standard propositional models. She has written extensively about figurative speech such as sarcasm and metaphor, arguing that these forms of speech force listeners to reconsider their standard methods of delineating the difference between what is meant and what is said.

== Education and career ==
As an undergraduate, Camp attended the University of Michigan, graduating in 1993 and double-majoring in philosophy and English. After graduating, Camp worked as an educational organizer in Chicago, creating and putting into practice programs designed to help residents of public housing study for their GED's and programs to provide instruction in English as a second language to members of Chicago's Latino community. Camp eventually decided to return to school, and received a doctorate in philosophy from the University of California, Berkeley in 2003. As a graduate student, her advisors were John Searle, Richard Wollheim, and John MacFarlane.

After receiving her doctorate, Camp spent several years at Harvard University as part of the Harvard Society of Fellows, before moving to the University of Pennsylvania in 2006 where she was an Assistant and then Associate Professor of Philosophy until 2013. In 2013, Camp accepted a tenured offer from Rutgers University where she is Professor of Philosophy (and where she is additionally affiliated with the Rutgers Center for Cognitive Science.) Brian Leiter viewed Camp's move to Rutgers as cementing the reputation of Rutgers' philosophy department as a leader in the fields of philosophy of mind, philosophy of language, and aesthetics.

Besides her academic appointments, Camp is also active in efforts to encourage the participation of women in academic philosophy. Along with Elizabeth Harman and Jill North, Camp initiated and co-organized Athena in Action, a series of workshops aimed at providing mentorship and networking opportunities to graduate student women in philosophy, which met at Princeton in 2014, 2016 and 2018. The workshop continued (in virtual form) at Cornell in 2020, and will rotate among locations going forward.

== Research areas ==
Much of Camp's research has focused on forms of thought and speech that do not fit neatly in to standard propositional models. An especial focus of her research has been figurative speech such as sarcasm and metaphor, although she has also worked significantly in other areas, including the effects that loaded language (such as slurs) can have on conversational dynamics, and how conversations are affected when a speaker and a listener are uncertain about whether or not their interests agree. Camp has strongly defended the idea of the indispensability of metaphor. She has also written on philosophical issues involving concepts as well as on animal cognition. Camp has also made an effort to counter arguments used against the classical Gricean implicature account of metaphor, making a number of arguments intended to show that contextualist approaches to metaphor are flawed and that it is in fact possible for what is meant by a speaker to differ from what is literally said by a speaker, even in situations where the speaker appears to be quite candid in their speech.

== Publications ==
Camp has published a number of peer-reviewed papers in journals such as Noûs, Philosophy and Phenomenological Research, Philosophical Studies and Philosophical Quarterly. She has also contributed chapters to a number of books, including chapters in A Companion to Donald Davidson (part of the Blackwell Companions to Philosophy series,) and Concepts: New Directions.
