= Peg Birmingham =

American philosophy professor

Philosophical work
- Institutions: DePaul University, Marist College, Duquesne University
- Main interests: Social philosophy, political philosophy, ethics, feminist theory

Peg Birmingham is an American professor of philosophy at DePaul University. Much of Birmingham's work has focused on the work of Hannah Arendt, to whose thought she is considered to have made a profound contribution, although her interest has also ranged widely through other subjects, primarily in modern social and political philosophy, as well as feminist theory.

== Education and career ==
Birmingham received her bachelor's from the University of Wisconsin, Green Bay in 1978 before moving to Duquesne University where she received her master's and doctoral degrees in philosophy in 1980 and 1986, respectively. After receiving her doctoral degree, Birmingham accepted an appointment as Assistant Professor of Philosophy at Marist College, where she stayed until 1990. In 1990, she moved to the New York City campus of Pace University as Assistant Professor of Philosophy and Edward J. Mortola Scholar. In 1992, she accepted an appointment at DePaul University as full Professor of Philosophy.

== Research areas and publications ==
Birmingham has published two books - Hannah Arendt and the Right to Have Rights: The Predicament of Common Responsibility in 2006, and Dissensus Communis: Between Ethics and Politics in 1995. She's also contributed a large number of book chapters, an encyclopedia entry, and a dozen peer-reviewed papers. Most of Birmingham's work has focused on or built on top of the work of Hannah Arendt (though despite Arendt's moral minimalism, Birmingham is a moral maximalist.)

In Hannah Arendt and the Right to Have Rights: The Predicament of Common Responsibility, Birmingham rejects claims that Arendt's notion of a basic 'right to have rights' is fundamentally flawed, and argues that the right to have rights (that is, to belong to a state that respects rights) is something that should be guaranteed by humanity (though Birmingham acknowledges that she is not sure whether this is in fact practical.) Birmingham views Arendt as having constructed the notion of the 'right to have rights' in such a way as to be meaningful in a world that lacks universal humanity. Birmingham views Arendt's work as a whole as an effort to construct a 'right to have rights' absent the concepts of shared humanity, reason, individual autonomy, and other common justifications behind the idea of a 'right to have rights.'
