= Philosophy Compass =

Academic journal

Philosophy Compass is a peer-reviewed academic journal publishing review articles on current issues in philosophy. It is published by Wiley-Blackwell and the editor-in-chief is Alexander Guerrero (Rutgers University). The journal was established in 2006 and has twelve sections: aesthetics, continental, epistemology, ethics, history of philosophy, logic & language, metaphysics, mind & cognitive science, naturalistic philosophy, philosophy of science, philosophy of religion, and legal & political philosophy.
