= Patricia Greenspan =

American philosopher

Philosophical work
- Institutions: University of Maryland, College Park, University of Chicago, Harvard University
- Main interests: Moral philosophy, moral psychology, philosophy of action, deontic logic, free will, moral responsibility, emotion, moral dilemmas, metaethics, practical reason, and rationality

Patricia Greenspan is a professor of philosophy at the University of Maryland, College Park. Greenspan works in analytic philosophy of action, and is known for work on rationality, morality, and emotion that helped to create a place for emotion in philosophy of action and ethics.

She is the author of two books, Emotions and Reasons and Practical Guilt, and numerous articles and book chapters. Her work is cited both within philosophy (especially aesthetics) and in a number of areas, including medicine, law, theology, and education along with non-scholarly venues. She has given presentations in the U.S. and abroad to interdisciplinary conferences and philosophy department colloquia.

== Education and career ==
Greenspan graduated from Barnard College summa cum laude with a B.A. in philosophy in 1966. In 1972 she received her Ph.D. from the Harvard University Philosophy Department, receiving the Emily and Charles Carrier Award for the best dissertation in moral philosophy. She then moved to an Assistant Professor position at the University of Chicago, where in 1979 she was awarded tenure and promoted to associate professor in the Department of Philosophy and the college. In 1980 she accepted an offer from the University of Maryland, College Park, where she was promoted to full Professor in 1989. Greenspan served as an Andrew Mellon Fellow at the University of Pittsburgh for the 1975–76 year, and has received several research fellowships, including from the National Endowment for the Humanities (1983–84), the National Humanities Center (1990–91), and the Research School of Social Science at the Australian National University (1995).

== Research areas ==
Greenspan's principal research interests lie in moral philosophy, moral psychology, and the philosophy of action. Her work has ranged among several interconnected subtopics, as follows:

- Deontic logic: Greenspan's Ph.D. dissertation and her first published article dealt with the logic of ought-judgments, arguing that "oughts" are "time-bound" and that wide-scope conditional ought-judgments allow for detachment only when their antecedents are no longer avoidable.
- Free will and moral responsibility: Greenspan's second major article and ongoing work argues that freedom depends on the difficulty of doing otherwise, rather than simply ability, and hence admits of degrees. Greenspan's developed view also distinguishes between freedom and responsibility, arguing that the compatibility of responsibility with free will does not imply a similar compatibilist view of freedom. Greenspan has applied some of her work on these subjects to questions arising from the U.S. Genome Project and to the issue of the responsibility of psychopaths.
- Emotion: Greenspan next began a long-running project on the rational and moral role of emotion with the publication of an article defending the rationality of ambivalent emotions in an argument designed to cast doubt on attempts by several contemporary philosophers to equate emotions with evaluative judgments or beliefs. Her first book argues instead that emotions amount to feelings with an evaluative intentional content short of belief that makes them both susceptible to a distinctive kind of rational assessment and important in a distinctive way to rational and moral motivation, paradoxically serving as a counterforce to weakness of will. A second book and some later essays simplify this account, defend it against some common objections, and apply it to further issues, as outlined below.
- Moral dilemmas: In an essay and in her second book Greenspan argues for the coherency of irresolvable moral dilemmas, cases in which all alternatives are forbidden. She sees dilemmas as a result of the need to establish the motivational force of morality by forging a connection in childhood between emotions and rules simple enough to be learned at that early stage.
- Metaethics: Greenspan defends what she calls a "social artifact" version of moral realism, in which morality is invented, yet "real" (in the sense of mind-independent) insofar as it reflects the requisites of life in a viable social group. She sees emotion as essential to the motivational force of moral judgments in general terms, though not necessarily on each occasion of use or for every agent. She thus departs from contemporary "internalist" understandings of moral meaning that deny the possibility of understanding a moral judgment without being motivated by it.
- Practical reasons and rationality: Greenspan argues that emotions play a significant role in rational thought, as noted. In recent work she gives an independent account of practical reasons as registering or responding to criticism. The account allows for the rational permissibility in certain cases of action against one's strongest reason and is brought to bear on issues including the rationality of "satisficing" (choosing less than the best) and the notion of "imperfect" obligation (an obligation that leaves room for options).

== Selected works ==
- "Conditional Oughts and Hypothetical Imperatives", Journal of Philosophy, 72 (1975), 259–76
- "Behavior Control and Freedom of Action", Philosophical Review, 87 (1978), 225–40
- "A Case of Mixed Feelings: Ambivalence and the Logic of Emotion", in A. O. Rorty (ed.), Explaining Emotions (Berkeley: University of California Press, 1980)
- Emotions and Reasons: An Inquiry into Emotional Justification (New York: Routledge, Chapman and Hall, 1988)
- Practical Guilt: Moral Dilemmas, Emotions, and Social Norms (New York: Oxford University Press, 1995)
- "Emotional Strategies and Rationality", Ethics, 110 (2000), 469–87
- "Practical Reasons and Moral 'Ought'", in Russ Schafer-Landau (ed.), Oxford Studies in Metaethics, Vol. II (Oxford: Oxford University Press, 2007), pp. 172–94
- "Learning Emotions and Ethics", in P. Goldie (ed.), The Oxford Handbook of Philosophy of Emotion (Oxford: Oxford University Press, 2010)
