= Anita Avramides =

British philosopher

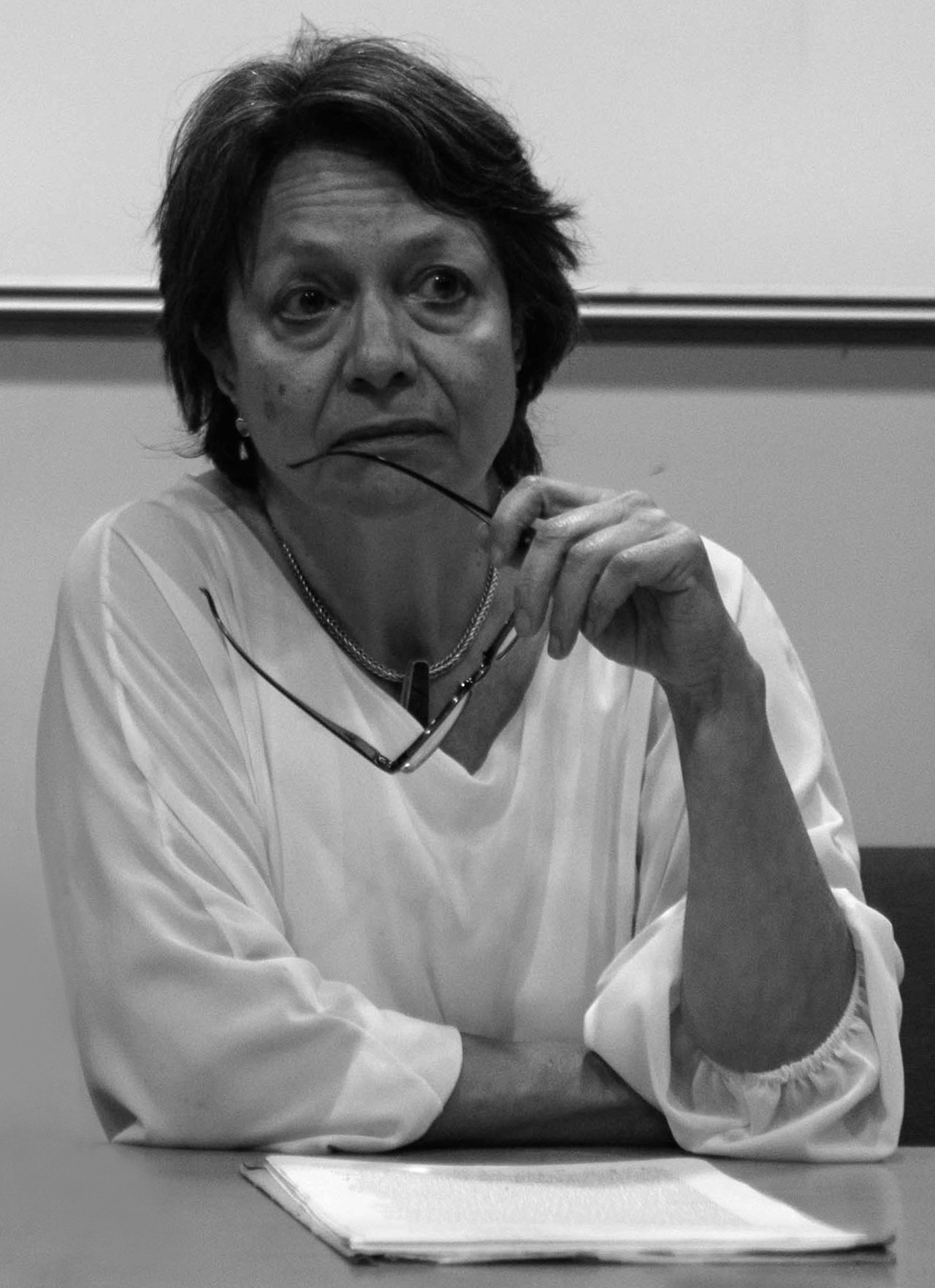
- Avramides in 2015

Education
- Education: Oberlin College, University College London, Somerville College, Oxford, The Queen's College, Oxford
- Doctoral advisor: John McDowell

Philosophical work
- Era: Contemporary philosophy
- Region: Western philosophy
- Institutions: St Hilda's College, Oxford, Bedford College, London
- Main interests: Philosophy of language, philosophy of the mind

Anita Avramides is a British philosopher whose work focuses on the philosophy of language, and the philosophy of the mind. She is a reader at the University of Oxford, based at St. Hilda's College, where she is Southover Manor Trust Tutorial Fellow in Philosophy. Since 2014, she has served as Vice Chair of the Philosophy Faculty at Oxford.

== Career ==
Avramides has worked on the philosophy of language, and the philosophy of the mind, most recently focusing on the knowledge of other minds. For Avramides, this question is at the intersection of the philosophy of mind, epistemology, and metaphysics. She believes that the 'problem' of other minds is conceptual, rather than epistemological.

Avramides is Southover Manor Trust Fellow in Philosophy, at St Hilda's College, Oxford. She has also been a full-time lecturer at The Queen's College, Oxford, and a visiting lecturer at Bedford College, London.

She has held part-time lecturer positions at Balliol College, Exeter College and Oriel College, Oxford.

== Education ==
Avramides received her doctorate (D.Phil.) from the University of Oxford, Somerville and Queen's College. She did her M.Phil. from University College London, and completed her undergraduate BA degree from Oberlin College, United States.

== Publications ==
Books

- Meaning and Mind: An Examination of a Gricean Account of Language MIT Press, 1989, ISBN 9780262511773
- Other Minds. Routledge. 14 December 2000. ISBN 978-1-135-19938-8.
- Women of Ideas (ed.) (1995) Duckworth.
