= Themistoclea =

6th century BCE Greek priestess at Delphi

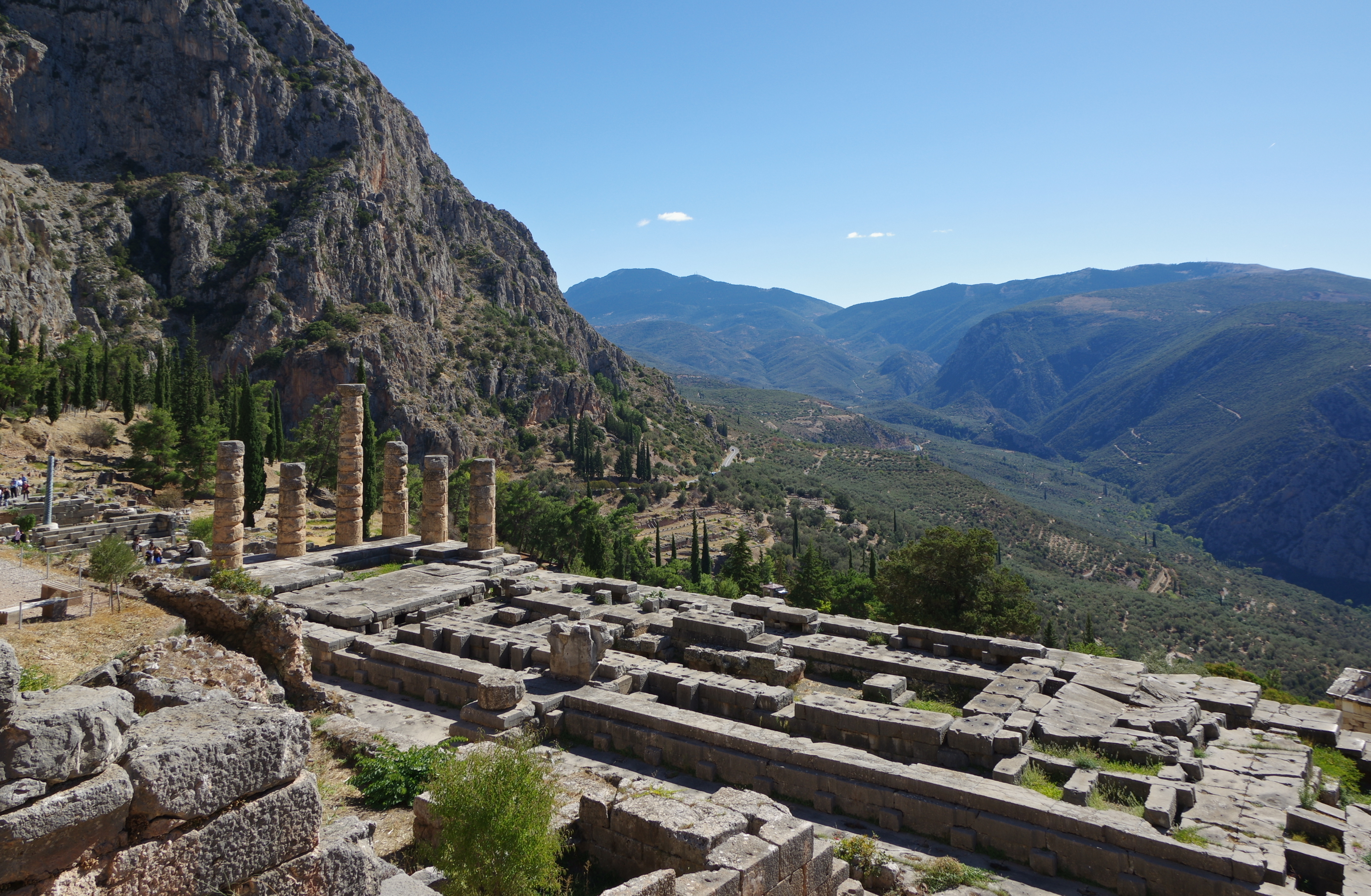
The Temple of Apollo/Delphi

Themistoclea (/ˌθɛmɪstəˈkliːə/; Ancient Greek: Θεμιστόκλεια Themistokleia; also Aristoclea (/ˌærɪstəˈkliːə/; Ἀριστοκλεία Aristokleia), Theoclea (/ˌθiːəˈkliːə/; Θεοκλεία Theokleia); fl. 6th century BCE) was a priestess at Delphi who was said to be a teacher of Pythagoras.

In the biography of Pythagoras in his Lives and Opinions of Eminent Philosophers, Diogenes Laërtius (3rd century CE) cites the statement of Aristoxenus (4th century BCE) that Themistoclea taught Pythagoras his moral doctrines: Porphyry (233–305 CE) refers to a teacher of Pythagoras called Aristoclea, although there is little doubt that he is referring to the same person. The 10th-century Suda encyclopedia calls her Theoclea and states that she was the sister of Pythagoras, but this information probably arises from a corruption and misunderstanding of the passage in Diogenes Laertius.
