= Alison McIntyre =

American philosopher

Philosophical work
- Institutions: Wellesley College, Princeton University
- Main interests: philosophy of mind, moral theory, the history of moral philosophy, and 18th-century British moral psychology

Alison McIntyre is Professor Emerita of Philosophy at Wellesley College. McIntyre received her bachelor's and master's degrees from Tufts University, before going on to receive a doctoral degree from Princeton.

== Research areas and publications ==
McIntyre's research areas are varied, and include the philosophy of mind, moral theory, the history of moral philosophy, and 18th-century British moral psychology. Her current research is focused on the debates surrounding moral motivation and judgment that took place in Scotland, England, and Ireland, in the 17th and 18th centuries. McIntyre has also delved into issues of bioethics, specifically about the potential applications of the doctrine of double effect in end-of-life decision-making, specifically in the context of Vacco v. Quill and voluntary euthanasia. McIntyre believes that the difference between intentionality and foresight shouldn't be rejected, but believes that most attempts to explain the moral significance of the distinction ignore the many different contrasts it has been used to describe.
