= Ewa Ziarek =

American philosopher

Philosophical work
- Institutions: State University of New York at Buffalo, University of Notre Dame, University of Maine, Maquarie University, University of Tasmania
- Main interests: Feminist theory, modernism, continental philosophy, ethics, and critical theory

Ewa Plonowska Ziarek is the Julian Park Professor of Comparative Literature at The State University of New York at Buffalo (SUNY Buffalo). She has a major interest in engaging with other scholars on their own terms, and believes that a model of dissensus in philosophy, rather than the traditional consensus model, may produce highly valuable results.

== Education and career ==
Ziarek received her Bachelor of Arts degree in 1985 at the University of Warsaw. She then received a Master of Arts degree from SUNY Buffalo in 1988 and received a Doctor of Philosophy degree from the same institution in 1989. After earning her PhD, Ziarek accepted a position as assistant professor of English at the University of Notre Dame in 1989. She held that position until 1995, after which she became associate professor of English and Gender Studies. Additionally, from 1994 to 1999, she was the Director of Graduate Studies for Notre Dame's Department of English. In 2002, she was promoted to full Professor of English and Gender Studies.

Ziarek left Notre Dame in 2003 after accepting a 2004 appointment at SUNY Buffalo as the Julian Park Professor of Comparative Literature and Global Gender Studies and Sexuality, where she remains as of 2024. In 2005, she founded the University of Buffalo Humanities Institute and served as its director until 2008. Also, Ziarek served as the Associate Dean for Arts and Humanities from 2021 to 2024.

In addition to these permanent appointments, Ziarek has held several visiting academic positions. In 2005, she was a visiting scholar at the University of Tasmania. Then, in 2007, she was a visiting scholar at Macquarie University in Australia (a position supported by the Australian National Grant for International Scholars). Further, starting in 2007 and continuing into the present, she has been the Primary Visiting Faculty Member at the Institute for Doctoral Studies in the Visual Arts at the University of Maine. Finally, from 2016 to 2020, she was the Senior Research Fellow and adjunct professor in Continental Philosophy at the College of Fellows, Western Sydney University.

== Research areas ==
Ziarek is a feminist scholar of modernism and a feminist political theorist. She has published extensively in these areas (see publications section below), and her scholarly work has been translated into Italian, French, Polish, Rumanian, and Hebrew. She co-authored with Rosalyn Diprose Arendt, Natality and Biopolitics: Towards Democratic Plurality and Reproductive Justice (Edinburgh, 2019), which was awarded the Symposium: Canadian Journal for Continental Philosophy Book Award. Her other books include Feminist Aesthetics and the Politics of Modernism (Columbia, 2012); An Ethics of Dissensus: Feminism, Postmodernity, and the Politics of Radical Democracy (Stanford, 2001); The Rhetoric of Failure: Deconstruction of Skepticism, Reinvention of Modernism (1995); and numerous co-edited volumes, including Intermedialities: Philosophy, Art, Politics (SUNY, 2010); Time for the Humanities (2008) and Revolt, Affect, Collectivity: The Unstable Boundaries of Kristeva's Polis (2005). Ziarek has also edited three volumes and contributed many book chapters, as well as publishing many peer-reviewed papers on far-ranging subjects.

All her interdisciplinary publications address ethical, artistic, and philosophical aspects of democratic theory and culture from feminist intersectional perspectives. Her current book project examines the impact of AI on participatory, inclusive democracy.

== Publications ==
In addition to numerous peer-reviewed journal articles and book chapters, Ziarek has authored and edited several full-length books.

Books:

• Arendt, Natality and Biopolitics: Towards Democratic Plurality and Reproductive Justice. Co-authored with Rosalyn Diprose (Edinburgh: Edinburgh UP, 2018)

• Feminist Aesthetics and the Politics of Modernism (Columbia UP, 2012)

• An Ethics of Dissensus: Postmodernity, Feminism, and the Politics of Radical Democracy (Stanford UP, 2001).

• The Rhetoric of Failure: Deconstruction of Skepticism, Reinvention of Modernism (SUNY Press, 1995)

Edited Books:

• Continental Theory at Buffalo: Transatlantic Crossroads of a Critical Insurrection. Co-edited David Castillo and Jacques Thomas (SUNY, 2021)

• Intermedialities: Between Art, Politics, and Ethics. Co-edited with Henk Oosterling,(Lanham: Rowman &Littlefield, 2010)

• Time for the Humanities: Praxis and the Limits of Autonomy. Co-edited with James Bono and Tim Dean, (New York: Fordham UP, 2008)

• Revolt, Affect, Collectivity: The Unstable Boundaries of Kristeva’s Polis. Co-edited with Tina Chanter (SUNY Press, Series in Gender Theory, 2005)

• Gombrowicz’s Grimaces: Modernism, Gender, Nationality (SUNY Press, 1998)

== Awards ==
• Ziarek received the 2019-20 Book Prize of Symposium: Canadian Journal for Continental Philosophy for her Arendt, Natality and Biopolitics: Towards Democratic Plurality and Reproductive Justice, which was co-authored with Rosalyn Diprose.

• In 2019, Ziarek received The Elaine Stavro Distinguished Visiting Scholar in Theory, Politics and Gender at Trent University, Canada.

• In January 2016, Ziarek received the Honorary Doctor of Philosophy Degree from the Institute for Doctoral Studies in the Visual Arts, University of Maine.

== See also ==
- Feminist ethics
- Modernist literature
- Narrative theory
