= Amy Allen (philosopher) =

American philosopher (born 1970)

- Born: 1970 (age 55–56)
- Citizenship: United States of America
- Education: Northwestern University
- Scientific career
- Fields: Philosophy
- Workplaces: Dartmouth College University of Edinburgh Grinnell College Pennsylvania State University

Amy Allen (born 1970) is an American liberal arts research professor of philosophy and women's, gender, and sexuality studies at The Pennsylvania State University, where she is also head of department. Previously, she was the Parents Distinguished Research Professor in the Humanities, and professor of philosophy and gender and women's studies, at Dartmouth College, and was chair of its department of philosophy from 2006 to 2012. Her research takes a critical approach to feminist approaches of power, and attempts to broaden traditional feminist understandings of power to apply to transnational issues.

== Education and career ==
Allen received a bachelor's degree from Miami University in 1992, and a master's and doctorate in philosophy from Northwestern University, in 1992 and 1996 respectively. She spent 1996–1997 as a visiting assistant professor of philosophy at Grinnell College and 1997–1999 as a visiting assistant professor of philosophy at Dartmouth College, before accepting a permanent appointment there. In 2004, she was promoted to associate professor and received a cross-appointment in the women's and gender studies department. She spent a term abroad as visiting professor of philosophy at the University of Edinburgh in 2006, before returning to Dartmouth and chairing the philosophy department for six years.

She has sat on the executive committee of the eastern division of the American Philosophical Association, and has been an executive co-director of the Society for Phenomenology and Existential Philosophy, a co-editor-in-chief of Constellations: An International Journal of Critical and Democratic Theory, and editor of the series New Directions in Critical Theory published by Columbia University Press.

== Publications ==
Allen has published three books: The Power of Feminist Theory: Domination, Resistance, Solidarity,The Politics of Our Selves: Power, Autonomy and Gender in Contemporary Critical Theory and The End of Progress: Critical Theory in Postcolonial Times. The Power of Feminist Theory was a revised version of Allen's dissertation that focused on assessing pre-existing feminist understandings of power combining the insight offered by poststructuralists with that of normative critical theory, despite the fact that the two camps are often considered to be diametrically opposed. Allen's second book built on the foundations of her first, attempting to bridge the gap between Foucaultian and Habermasian critical theory. Her third attends to a critique of the oft-called fourth generation of the Frankfurt School Critical Theory, based on its continued usage of concepts such as progress and development. Allen challenges what she sees as eurocentrism in the work of theorists such as Axel Honneth, Rainer Forst and Jürgen Habermas and proposes a revision of the tenets of Critical Theory in light of Postcolonial Studies and Decolonial Thought.
