= Lynne Tirrell =

American philosopher

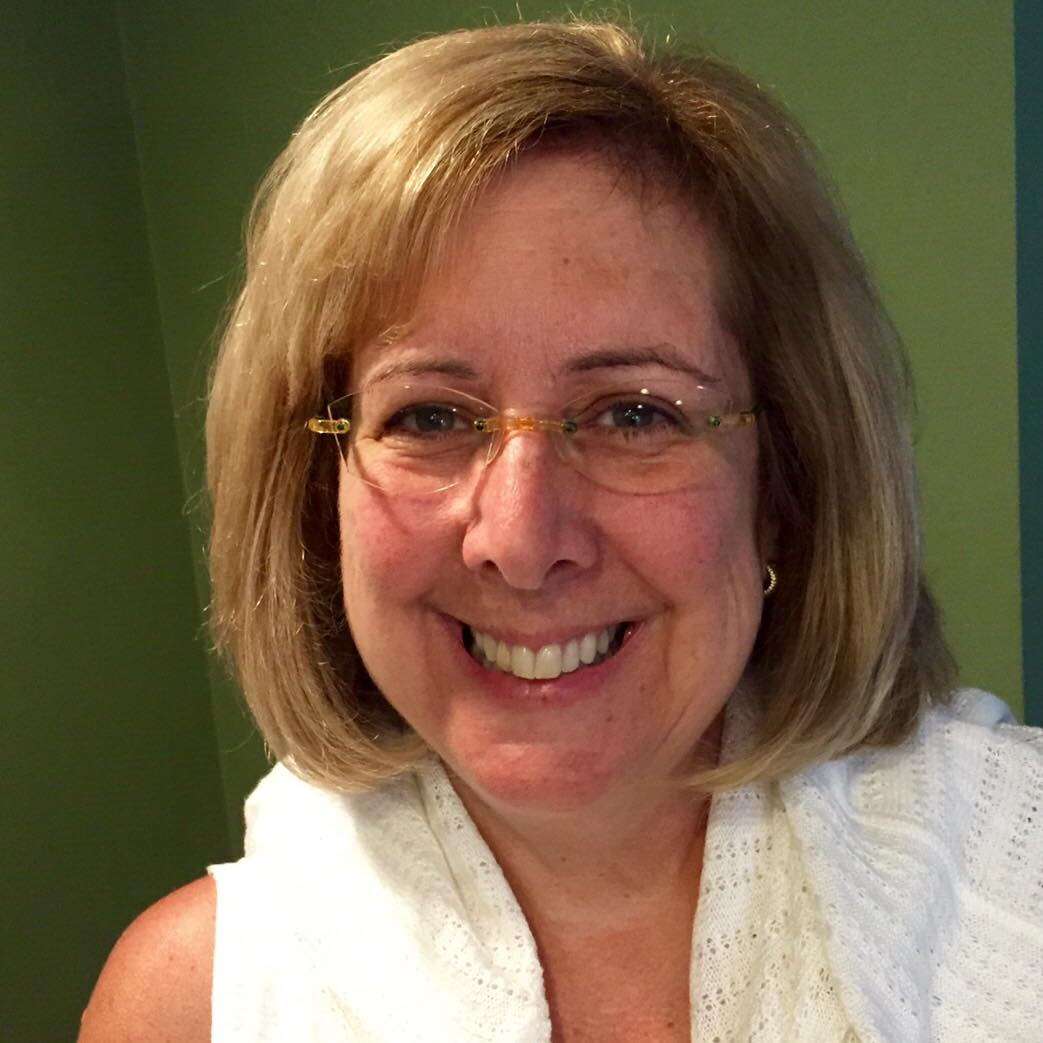

Philosophical work
- Institutions: University of Connecticut, University of Massachusetts, Boston, UNC-Chapel Hill, University of Pittsburgh

Lynne Tirrell is Professor of Philosophy at the University of Connecticut, where she is also affiliated with the Human Rights Institute. Much of the body of her work focuses on hate speech, especially the practical effects of linguistic practices in shaping the social conditions that make genocide and other significant acts of oppression possible. Her research started in the United States but quickly branched in to other regions of the world, and now focuses on Rwanda and the surrounding region. From 2014 to 2017, she also served as the chair of the APA Committee on Public Philosophy. Her current work develops an analysis of Toxic Speech, bringing philosophy and epidemiology into conversation.

== Education and career ==
Tirrell received her bachelor's in philosophy from the University of Wisconsin-Madison in 1980 and went on to earn her doctorate in philosophy (with a dissertation focused on metaphor) from the University of Pittsburgh in 1986 under the direction of Robert Brandom. After receiving her doctorate, she accepted an appointment as an Assistant Professor of Philosophy at the University of North Carolina at Chapel Hill, receiving tenure and Associate Professorship status in 1994. In 1993, Tirrell accepted an appointment as Assistant Professor of Philosophy at the University of Massachusetts, Boston, before being promoted to Associate Professor - a position she occupied until July 2017. At U Mass Boston, she also taught in Women's Studies. Tirrell also served a year as Visiting Associate Professor of Philosophy in 2004–2005 at Wellesley College, and in Spring 2018 visited in the Philosophy department at the University of Pittsburgh.

== Research areas and publications ==
Tirrell has written a large number of peer-reviewed papers, contributed to a number of anthologies, and written several encyclopedia articles. Much of the body of Tirrell's work focuses on hate speech, especially the practical effects of linguistic practices in shaping the social conditions that make genocide and other significant acts of oppression possible. Tirrell's hate speech research is distinctive in its emphasis on the inferential power of the racial epithet, holding that its power to license socially damaging inferences is more significant and more insidious than the performative action of hurling it. Tirrell uses the tools of inferential role semantics to explain what is at issue between those who think certain deeply derogatory terms (especially racist derogations that enact oppression) should be banned (she calls them 'Absolutists'), and those who think the terms can safely be used by members of the groups who are targeted by such words (she calls these 'Reclaimers'). As Tirrell's research progressed, she began to integrate her inferentialist approach with speech act theory, and Wittgenstein's basic concept of a language game.

Tirrell's research started in the United States but later branched in to other regions of the world, now focusing on Rwanda and the surrounding region. Focusing more on 'speech as action' than she previously had, and working on explaining the action-engendering power of certain deeply derogatory terms led her towards studying the role of changing speech practices before and during the Rwandan genocide (which then led her to participate in discussions with prosecutors at the International Criminal Tribunal for Rwanda in Tanzania.) In related work, Tirrell has argued that apology, although by itself an insufficient means of making amends, is in fact a prerequisite to doing so - and that reparations and humanitarian aid, unless coupled with an apology, result in a situation where true reconciliation has not occurred.

Tirrell is also noteworthy for her sophisticated and nuanced arguments in feminist philosophy of language. She argues that for women to thrive, the inherent male biases of English must be altered, making way for a competing view of the world to be put forward - an argument she goes into detail in her 1993 essay "Definition and Power: Toward Authority Without Privilege." Tirrell has also addressed the anti-pornography views of Catharine MacKinnon, using her own analysis of hate speech to support MacKinnon's views about subordination and silencing, while emphasizing the importance of protecting women's ability to articulate their own experiences. Policies against sexist discursive practices must not be so stringent that they undermine the creative development of new discursive practices and the semantic authority of members of oppressed groups. Tirrell has also written extensively on issues of metaphor. In a series of articles, she develops the view that any account of metaphor should center on what it is to interpret a bit of discourse metaphorically, rather than looking for semantic or syntactic markers that elicit such interpretations. In "Extending: The Structure of Metaphor" (Noûs, 1989), she uses extended metaphors as the basis for a substantive account of metaphorical interpretation, and introduces the concept of expressive commitment, commitment to the viability and value of particular modes of discourse. Unlike literal interpretation, metaphorical interpretation puts the expressive commitment in the forefront of the interpretive process. Through this early inferentialist approach, Tirrell's account explains the affinities and differences between extension and explication, and hence of the age-old problem of paraphrase. Further, the account allows for the open-endedness of metaphor without succumbing to the view that metaphor is non-cognitive. In later work, Tirrell decisively undermines the view that metaphor should be understood as elliptical simile ("Reductive and Non-Reductive Simile Theories of Metaphor"(J. Phil, 1991). Her work brings inferential role semantics, as developed in the Pittsburgh School, to bear on alternative theories of metaphor, and shows the importance of interpretive practices.
