= Mary Kate McGowan =

American philosophy professor

- Born: 1968 (age 57–58)

Philosophical work
- Era: Contemporary philosophy
- Region: Western philosophy
- School: Feminism
- Institutions: Wellesley College, Princeton University
- Main interests: Philosophy of language, philosophy of law, metaphysics

Mary Kate McGowan (born 1968) is an American philosopher who is the Luella LaMer Professor of Women's Studies as well as Professor of Philosophy at Wellesley College. McGowan has written a large number of peer-reviewed articles, contributed three commissioned book chapters, and has co-edited one book: Speech and Harm: Controversies Over Free Speech.

== Education and career ==
McGowan received her bachelor's degree at Wellesley College in philosophy and mathematics in 1990, going on to receive a master's (1993) and a doctorate (1996) in philosophy from Princeton University. After receiving her doctorate, McGowan accepted a position as assistant professor of philosophy at the University of Maryland, Baltimore County, which she left to accept a position as assistant professor of philosophy at Wellesley College in 1998. McGowan received a promotion to associate professor in 2004 and full professor in 2011. McGowan currently serves as the Luella LaMer Professor of Women's Studies, and also previously served as the Class of 1966 Associate Professor (a chair endowed by Wellesley's class of 1966.)

== Research areas ==
McGowan specializes in studying the subtle ways that speech can be used to alter normative facts, and how this technique may be involved in the perpetuation of unjust social systems. She argues that conversational contributions enact normative fact in a way that is not, at the surface, visible, and in a way that in fact requires little authority. Her more recent work has generalized this phenomenon to settings that are not entirely conversational, arguing that sexist speech, some pornography, and some types of hate speech are much more harmful than are currently recognized, and that this has significant implications in public and legal debates over the limits of free speech. She's also interested how one defines the liminal areas of speech; burning a flag, though not an obvious act of speech, is considered protected speech, whereas orally agreeing to a contract for murder for hire, though most certainly speech, is universally not protected.
