= Felicia Nimue Ackerman =

Writer, poet, and professor of philosophy at Brown University

- Born: Diana Felicia Ackerman; 1947 (age 78–79)
- Occupations: Professor, Brown University

Academic background
- Education: A.B., Cornell University; Ph.D. University of Michigan
- Thesis: Proper Names, Natural Kind Terms and Propositional Attitudes (1976)

Felicia Nimue Ackerman (born 1947) is an American author, poet, and philosopher and professor of philosophy at Brown University. She is a prolific writer of letters to the editor of The New York Times. She is the longest active professor at Brown University.

== Early life and education ==
Ackerman was born in 1947 in Brooklyn, New York. She's the daughter of Arthur and Zelda Ackerman.

She received her A.B., summa cum laude, from Cornell University in 1968, and earned her Ph.D. from the University of Michigan, Ann Arbor, in 1976. Regarding her name, she writes, "Felicia Nimue is a double first name like Mary Jane, and I'm called the whole thing". She named herself, "after Nimue, the Lady of the Lake. She explains that she changed her name 'partly because I like her and partly because it was pretty,' and follows with, 'I named myself. After all, your parents have nothing to go on when they name you, because they don’t know you!' "

== Selected publications ==
Ackerman's research interests center on the philosophy of literature, bioethics, and moral psychology:

- Ackerman, Felicia Nimue, "Patient and Family Decisions about Life-Extension and Death", in Rosamond Rhodes; Leslie P. Francis; Anita Silvers (15 April 2008). The Blackwell Guide to Medical Ethics. John Wiley & Sons. pp. 5–. ISBN 978-0-470-68060-5.
- Ackerman, Felicia Nimue (2009-02-12). "Death is a Punch in the Jaw: Life-Extension and its Discontents". In Steinbock, Bonnie (ed.). The Oxford Handbook of Bioethics. doi:10.1093/oxfordhb/9780199562411.003.0015. ISBN 978-0-19-956241-1.

According to Oxford Handbooks Online Scholarly Research Review, "her short stories on bioethical themes have appeared in Commentary, Mid‐American Review, Prize Stories 1990: The O. Henry Awards (Doubleday, 1990), and Clones and Clones: Facts and Fantasies About Human Cloning (Norton, 1998)."

She has published fifteen short stories, including:

- "Flourish Your Heart in This World", in M. Nussbaum and C. Sunstein (eds.), Clones and Clones: Facts and Fantasies about Human Cloning (Norton, 1998): 310–31, reprinted in American Philosophical Association Newsletter on Philosophy and Medicine, Spring 1999: 134–40.
- "The Other Two Sides", in S. Hales (ed.), What Philosophy Can Tell You About Your Cat (Open Court, 2008): 89–100, reprinted in American Philosophical Association Newsletter on Philosophy and Medicine, Spring 2009: 18–21, and in Italian translation, Il Gatto e la Filosofia, ed. Steven D. Hales, trans. F. Verzotto (Colla Editore, 2011).

She writes a monthly op-ed column for The Providence Journal.

Ackerman is also a frequent letter writer to The New York Times, especially on subjects relating to the treatment of the elderly. Andrew Marantz of The Atlantic says letters editor Thomas Feyer named Ackerman the top contender as record holder for the most letters published, exceeding 200 letters since 1987. In a WNYC interview, Feyer also noted Ackerman writes as many as five letters to the editor per day.

== Awards ==
From January to June 1985, she served as Senior Fulbright Lecturer in Philosophy at the Hebrew University of Jerusalem.

In 1988–89, she served as a Fellow at the Center for Advanced Study in the Behavioral Sciences.

In 1990, her short story, "The Forecasting Game: a story" was published in the annual Prize Stories 1990 O. Henry Awards collection.
