= Chris Cuomo (philosopher) =

American philosopher

Philosophical work
- Institutions: University of Georgia, University of Cincinnati
- Main interests: Ethics, feminist philosophies, race, sexuality, environmental ethics, art, ecofeminism

Chris Cuomo is the Professor of Philosophy and Women's Studies at the University of Georgia. She is also an affiliate faculty member of the Environmental Ethics Certificate Program, the Institute for African-American Studies, and the Institute for Native American Studies (all also at the University of Georgia). Before moving to the University of Georgia, Cuomo was the Obed J. Wilson Professor of Ethics at the University of Cincinnati.

== Education and career ==
Cuomo received her doctorate in philosophy from the University of Wisconsin Madison in 1992.

Prior to her current appointment at the University of Georgia, Cuomo held appointments at the University of Cincinnati (where she was the Obed J. Wilson Professor of Ethics,) as well as at Cornell University, Amherst College and Murdoch University. Besides her academic appointments, Cuomo has also received research grants from the Rockefeller Foundation, the National Science Foundation, the National Council for Research on Women, and Idea for Creative Exploration.

== Research areas ==
Cuomo's work has covered a wide area, but her primary focuses have included attempts to articulate feminist philosophy on its own terms and interdisciplinary efforts to bridge the gap between theory and practice, especially in ways which join social and environmental concerns. She has also brought feminist approaches in to a wide variety of other theoretical fields, including environmental ethics, environmental justice, climate justice, and various forms of activism. Much of Cuomo's current research focuses on climate justice and how indigenous knowledge is crucial for understanding the effects of, and solutions to, climate change.

== Publications ==
Cuomo has authored or co-authored several books, including:

- Feminism and Ecological Communities: An Ethic of Flourishing (1998)
- Whiteness: Feminist Philosophical Reflections (1999)
- The Philosopher Queen: Feminist Essays on War, Love, and Knowledge (2003)
- Feminist Philosophy Reader (a popular introductory textbook, co-authored with Alison Bailey.)

=== Feminism and Ecological Communities: An Ethic of Flourishing ===
In Feminism and Ecological Communities: An Ethic of Flourishing, Cuomo, in a significant departure from earlier scholars, proposes a theoretical framework for ecofeminism that emphasizes the feminism over the eco. Cuomo argues, far more strongly than traditional environmental ethicists, that the subordination of nature to man cannot be properly understood without first understanding the subordination of woman to man. A key component of Cuomo's ecological feminism is the idea of 'flourishing' – a condition wherein attention is paid not only to the interests of the person who does the valuing, but also to the interests of the thing that is being valued.
