= Valerie Tiberius =

Canadian philosopher

Philosophical work
- Institutions: University of Minnesota, Franklin and Marshall College, University of North Carolina, Chapel Hill
- Main interests: Ethics; moral psychology; well-being; wisdom

Valerie Tiberius is a Canadian philosophy professor at the University of Minnesota, an institution she has been affiliated with since 1998. She has published numerous reviewed papers as well as five books: Deliberation about the Good: Justifying What We Value, The Reflective Life: Living Wisely with Our Limits, Well-Being as Value Fulfillment: How We Can Help Each Other to Live Well, Moral Psychology: A Contemporary Introduction, and What Do You Want Out of Life? A Philosophical Guide to Figuring Out What Matters. Her latest book, Artificially Yours: Real Friendship in a World of Chatbots, is set to be published on May 12, 2026. Much of her work has taken a practical, empirical approach to philosophical questions, trying to show how these disciplines can improve the world.

== Education and career ==
Tiberius received a bachelor's degree in philosophy from the University of Toronto in 1990, before going on to obtain a master's and doctorate in philosophy from the University of North Carolina at Chapel Hill in 1992 and 1997, respectively. Her doctoral thesis was titled Deliberation About the Good, which later became the basis for her first book. After receiving her doctorate, Tiberius accepted a position as assistant professor at Franklin and Marshall College, before taking an assistant professorship at the University of Minnesota, Twin Cities, in 1998. She was promoted to associate professor in 2004 and to full professor in 2011.

== Research areas ==
Tiberius's work has focused on ethics and moral psychology, with a special interest in applying Humean principles to modern philosophical questions. Much of her work is centered at the junction of practical philosophy and practical psychology, examining how both disciplines can meaningfully improve lives. Much of her work takes a non-traditional, empirical approach to traditional philosophical questions.

== Publications ==
Tiberius has published a number of peer-reviewed papers as well as five books: Deliberation about the Good: Justifying What We Value, The Reflective Life: Living Wisely with our Limits, Well-Being as Value Fulfillment: How We Can Help Each Other to Live Well, Moral Psychology: A Contemporary Introduction, and What Do You Want Out of Life? A Philosophical Guide to Figuring Out What Matters. She has also contributed numerous other book chapters, introductions, and articles. Her latest book, Artificially Yours: Real Friendship in a World of Chatbots, is set to be published on May 12, 2026.

=== The Reflective Life: Living Wisely with Our Limits ===
Tiberius's second book, The Reflective Life: Living Wisely with Our Limits, attempts to bridge the gap between theoretical philosophy and day-to-day life, providing an explanation for why anyone should care about issues of ethical inquiry. She does so by bringing a Humean approach to the ideas of reflective values and reflective virtues. The viewpoint Tiberius introduces represents a novel synthesis of ancient philosophy with modern phenomenology and cognitive psychology. Tiberius's volume is one of the first attempts to deal with the implications of introspection illusion, the adaptive unconscious, affective forecasting, and their implications for modern ethical theory.

== Books ==
- Deliberation about the Good: Justifying What We Value (2000)
- The Reflective Life: Living Wisely with Our Limits (2008)
- Well-Being as Value Fulfillment: How We Can Help Each Other to Live Well (2018)
- Moral Psychology: A Contemporary Introduction (2023)
- What Do You Want Out of Life? A Philosophical Guide to Figuring Out What Matters (2023)
- Artificially Yours: Real Friendship in a World of Chatbots (May 12, 2026)
