= Anita Superson =

American professor of philosophy

Philosophical work
- Institutions: University of Kentucky, University of Waterloo, University of Michigan, Ann Arbor, Kansas State University, University of Illinois at Chicago, University of Tennessee, Knoxville
- Main interests: Meta-ethics, moral skepticism, practical reason, normative ethics, applied ethics, moral psychology, feminism

Anita Superson is an American philosopher who is a professor of philosophy at the University of Kentucky. She was also the visiting Churchill Humphrey and Alex P. Humphrey Professor of Feminist Philosophy at the University of Waterloo during the winter term of 2013.

== Education and career ==
Superson received a bachelor's in biology from DePaul University in 1981 and went on to receive a master's in philosophy (with a concentration in medical ethics) from the University of Tennessee, Knoxville in 1985 and a doctorate in philosophy from the University of Illinois at Chicago in 1989.

Superson is currently a professor of philosophy at the University of Kentucky, where she has held an appointment since 1992. She is an affiliated faculty member of the Gender and Women's Studies Department at the University of Kentucky. She also holds the visiting Churchill Humphrey and Alex P. Humphrey Professorship in Feminist Philosophy at the University of Waterloo for the winter of 2013. She also held a visiting professorship at the University of Michigan, Ann Arbor in 2008. Before her current appointments, she held an assistant professorship at Kansas State University, and also taught at the University of Illinois at Chicago and the University of Tennessee, Knoxville.

== Research areas ==
Superson's research brings the tools of analytic philosophy to bear on the issues presented by feminism, especially those issues that lie at feminism's intersection with ethics. She is especially interested in issues of moral skepticism, moral authority or bindingness, internalism/externalism, responsibility, agency, deformed desires, social privilege, evil and immorality, and bodily autonomy. Her recent anthology attempts to document the impact that analytical feminism has made on mainstream philosophy in recent years.

== Publications ==
Superson has written one book - The Moral Skeptic, published in 2009. She has also co-edited two anthologies; Out from the Shadows: Analytical Feminist Contributions to Traditional Philosophy and Theorizing Backlash: Philosophical Reflections on the Resistance to Feminism, and published a number of peer-reviewed papers. Superson has also been on the editorial board of Teaching Philosophy since 2006 and is the subject co-editor for entries related to feminism in the Stanford Encyclopedia of Philosophy.

=== The Moral Skeptic ===
The Moral Skeptic is a treatment of the idea of moral skepticism from a feminist standpoint. In it, although Superson recognizes that there are problems inherent to the concept of justification, Superson still pursues the idea, believing it too central a part of philosophy to discard and that despite its problems, demonstrating that it is rational to be moral may have the effect of making people actually behave in a moral way. Superson believes that it is not possible to support morality by arguing the desirability of performing on an individual basis moral actions without taking in to account what motivates someone to perform those actions, and believes that the rationality of actions and the rationality of the motivation of those actions must be assessed in tandem.

Superson critiques the common presentation of the traditional moral skeptic as a theoretical actor who asks "Why should I act in a moral way?". Superson believes that this model overlooks two important facts: first, that people often benefit from privilege in a way that cannot be captured by such a model, and second, that the theoretical moral skeptic's own preferences might be deformed by their own oppressive experiences (and thus fulfilling them may not actually maximize their own self-interest.) Superson suggests that defeating the moral skeptic requires proving that the act of privileging oneself over others is irrational.

Superson aims to convince the reader that oppression is not only immoral but irrational, and believes that doing so may stop people from acting in oppressive ways. This thesis has been criticized by other feminist ethicists who believe that it is not sufficiently connected to the real world because it ignores the fact that people frequently behave in irrational ways and often continue behaving in such ways even if they realize their irrationality.
