= Ursula Wolf =

German philosophy professor and writer (born 1951)

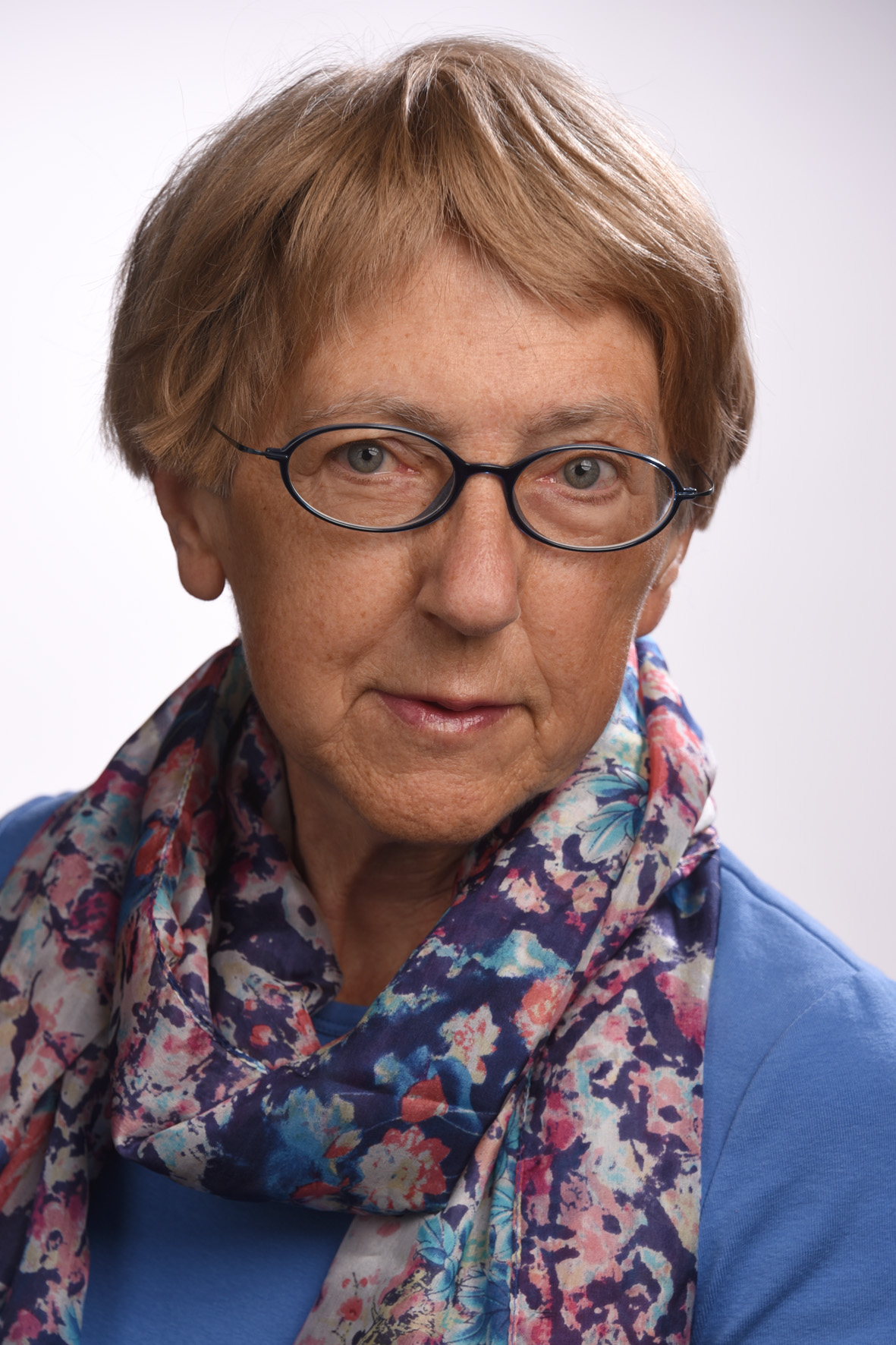
- Born: November 4, 1951 (age 74)

Ursula Wolf (born 4 November 1951 in Karlsruhe) is a German philosophy professor and a writer.

== Biography ==
She has been philosophy teacher at the Free University of Berlin, at the University of Frankfurt, and, now, at the University of Mannheim, where she holds a full professorship in that specialty.

In some of her work, Ursula Wolf argues for animal rights. Talking about animal testing, she argues that the fact that something can be useful for human beings or that is legal doesn't make it ethically right. She also criticizes the German Animal Protection Law that according to her has double standards because it says on the one hand that humans have moral obligations towards nonhuman animals, and on the other that these obligations disappear when it comes to investigation using animals.

== Selected works ==
- Das Tier in der Moral. Vittorio Klosterman, 1990
- Platons Frühdialoge. Rowohlt, 1996
- Die Philosophie und die Frage nach dem guten Leben. Rowohlt, Reinbek bei Hamburg 1999, ISBN 3-499-55572-7

== See also ==
- List of animal rights advocates
