= Susanne Sreedhar =

American philosopher

Philosophical work
- Institutions: Boston University, University of North Carolina at Chapel Hill, Duke University, Tulane University
- Main interests: Social contract theory, feminist philosophy, moral philosophy, political philosophy, democratic theory

Susanne Sreedhar is an associate professor of philosophy at Boston University. Sreedhar's work on social contract theory has been influential, and has mostly been aimed at the nature and scope of obligation within political systems, and the possibility of ethical civil disobedience within a Hobbesian system.

== Education and career ==
Sreedhar received her doctorate in philosophy in 2005 from the University of North Carolina at Chapel Hill, and has also previously received a graduate degree in Women's Studies from Duke University. After receiving her doctorate in philosophy, Sreedhar spent time as a tenure-track assistant professor of Philosophy and Women's Studies at Tulane University, before moving to Boston University in 2007 to accept an Assistant Professorship of Philosophy.

== Research areas ==
Most of Sreedhar's work has dealt with modern social contract theory, recently reinterpreted from a feminist perspective. Much of her work has looked at the nature and scope of obligation within political systems, and she is well known for her interpretation of Hobbes' work which holds that within Hobbesian theory, there exists a right to disobey and resist an unjust sovereign, even without a direct threat to one's life. This is significantly different than the traditional interpretation of Hobbes' work; most scholars believe that a Hobbesian view would demand absolute submission to an all-powerful sovereign, even if that sovereign is unjust, except in the case of self-defense (traditionally interpreted narrowly, as in defense of life.)

Sreedhar is well known for arguing that there is a strong potential for equality inherent within modern social contract theory, and that this possibility has existed as long as modern social contract theory has, but that it has not generally been recognized. Sreedhar's upcoming book, Gender and Early Modern Social Contract Theory, will lay out an argument that modern contract theory has included the potential for radical equality for as long as it has existed, and will attempt to explain the paths of history that have denied this possibility from ever being actualized. Sreedhar intends this book to represent a far more sustained investigation into the feminist potential of the social contract than has previously been conducted.

== Publications ==
Sreedhar has published a number of peer-reviewed papers, as well as one book, with another on the way, tentatively titled Gender and Early Modern Social Contract Theory.

Sreedhar's first book, Hobbes on Resistance: Defying the Leviathan argued that the traditional understanding of Hobbes demanding complete submission to an all-powerful sovereign is flawed. Sreedhar's reading of the rights that Hobbes assigns a sovereign's subjects is much broader than the traditional view. Sreedhar does recognize that some rebellions are still illegitimate under Hobbesian theory, but believes that any rebellion that is truly necessary is legitimate, even in the absence of an imminent fear of death. Further, Sreedhar argues that resistance against the sovereign is not justifiable just because death is bad, but because the average human's psychology impulse in the face of impending death or severe harm to fight is so great as to be impossible to overcome - in other words, man cannot promise the impossible. Moreover, such a clause would undermine the existence of the social contract, and is not necessary for the social contract to function in the first place.
