= Nancy Snow (philosopher) =

American philosopher

Nancy E. Snow
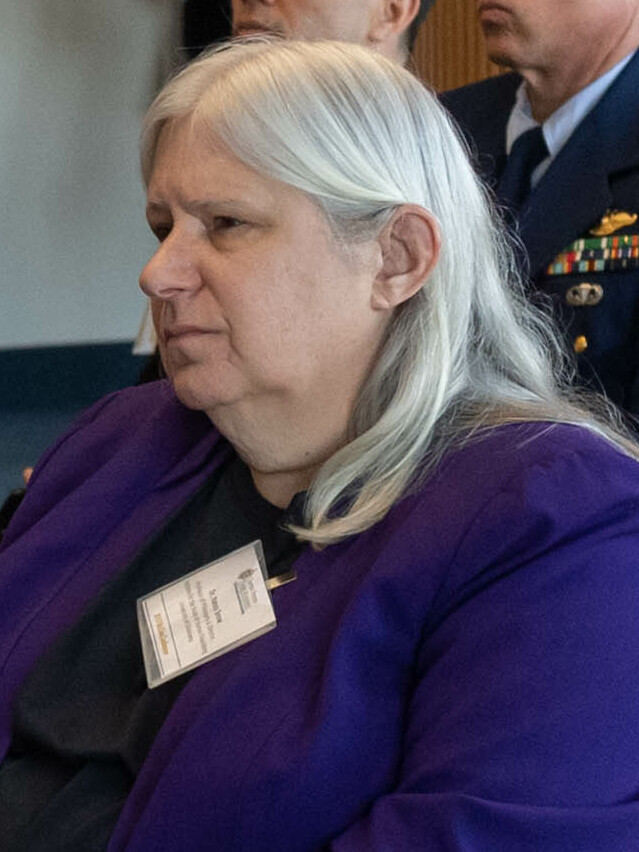
- Snow in 2019

Philosophical work
- Institutions: University of Kansas, University of Oklahoma, Marquette University, Arizona State University
- Notable ideas: Philosophy of law, social and political philosophy, moral psychology, feminist ethics business ethics, bioethics, freedom, and determinism

Nancy E. Snow is a professor of philosophy specializing in ethics at the University of Kansas. Her recent courses include Introduction to Ethics and Topics in the History of Philosophy. Prior to her move to Lawrence, she was a professor of philosophy and director of the Institute for the Study of Human Flourishing at the University of Oklahoma. Prior to her move to Norman, she was a professor of philosophy at Marquette University.

== Education and career ==
Snow received a bachelor's degree from the Marquette University in 1980, and a master's in philosophy, also from Marquette, in 1982. She went on to receive a doctorate from the University of Notre Dame in 1988.

Snow accepted an appointment as an assistant professor of philosophy at Arizona State University in 1987, before accepting an appointment as an assistant professor of philosophy at Marquette in 1989, where she has remained since. She was promoted to associate professor in 1996, and later promoted to full professor. While at Marquette, she served as the Director of Core Curriculum from 2002-2005. While at Marquette, she has driven efforts to improve the quality and diversity of courses the campus offers, especially in the realms of gender and sexuality, believing teaching to be a critically important role of the academic. She is the current associate editor for ethics and philosophy for The Journal of Moral Education, and is currently on the editorial boards of both Ethical Theory and Moral Practice and The Journal of Value Inquiry.

== Research areas ==
Her research has ranged widely, but has mostly focused on moral psychology and on virtue ethics. She has served as an editor of or on the editorial boards of a number of major journals, and has written or been primary editor of four books (as well as a large number of peer-reviewed papers.)

While Snow's research has dealt with issues in the philosophy of law, social and political philosophy, moral psychology, feminist ethics, business ethics, bioethics, freedom, and determinism, she has focused particularly on virtue ethics and specific virtues. She has also attempted to, wherever possible, bring psychology in to conversation with philosophy so as to buttress philosophical arguments. She also has a heavy interest in bringing other outside fields in to conversation with western philosophy, including anthropology, literature, theology, and other philosophical traditions such as the eastern philosophical traditions inspired by figures such as Confucius.

== Publications ==
Snow has written or been the primary editor of four books. She authored Virtue as Social Intelligence: An Empirically Grounded Theory, and edited Stem Cell Research: New Frontiers in Science and Ethics, Legal Philosophy: Multiple Perspectives, and In the Company of Others: Perspectives on Community, Family, and Culture.

=== Virtue as Social Intelligence: An Empirically Grounded Theory ===
In Virtue as Social Intelligence: An Empirically Grounded Theory, Snow points out that contemporary approaches to virtue ethics do not engage in a meaningful way with psychology, and thus remain vulnerable to the philosophical situationist challenge. In her book, Snow attempts to lay out an empirically grounded theory of virtue, hoping to avoid the challenges posed by philosophical situationists. Throughout the book, Snow examines in an empirically grounded way issues surrounding virtue, including advancing an empirical argument as to why virtue is in fact a good thing, and actively trying to counter the arguments of philosophical situationists. Snow considers virtue as a particular form of social intelligence, one that distinguishes itself from other forms of social intelligence by its motivation (care for the well-being of others.)
