= Josina Carolina van Lynden =

Dutch philosopher

Josina Carolina van Lynden (1716/1717 − 6 October 1791) was a Dutch philosopher who, in 1770, published a book on Logic, called De Logica of redenkunde. She was the first Dutch woman to publish on this topic.

Van Lynden was the daughter of Dirk van Lynden en Heilwig van Lynden, member of a Dutch noble family. She lived with her parents in Huis de Parck, a castle in Gelderland. At the age of 25, she married with Adriaan Buurt, a local pastor. Their marriage was not approved by some members of her family as she was part of a noble family while her husband was not. They had managed to postpone the wedding till Josina became 25, but could not prevent them form marrying. She was encouraged by her husband to endeavour in philosophical thinking. Her other works were written in response to his showing the close connection in their thinking. Next to writing, she also taught religion and logic to higher society girls. Josina died on 6 October 1791, nine years after her husband, and was buried next to her husband at the Nieuwe Kerk in Amsterdam.

In De Logica of redenkunde, she uses logical reasoning as a tool for searching religious truths and interpreting the Bible. It is divided in a theoretical and a practical part. One of the parts consists of a critique of John Locke's idea of the mind as a tabula rasa, the theory that humans are born with no innate knowledge and that. Van Lynden argues that some knowledge, like the idea of infinity, cannot be derived from experience. Her book was heavily influenced by Isaac Watts, he is cited multiple times throughout the work.

That a woman had published a philosophical work was very exceptional. It was positively received, with one critic commenting that it showed that women were also capable of abstract thinking and reasoning. He however, did not wish that other women would follow her example as such women would not make a good impression on men (possible suitors). Jensen states that the very modest tone in the preface shows Van Lynden was very much aware of her position as a woman in the field of logic. However, Josina argued, the truth stays the same, whether spoken by a woman or man.
