= Melissa (philosopher) =

Melissa (3rd century BC) was a Pythagorean philosopher. Her name derives from the Greek word melli meaning honey.

Nothing is known about her life. She is known only from a letter written to another woman named Cleareta (or Clearete). The letter is written in a Doric Greek dialect dated to around the 3rd century BC. The letter discusses the need for a wife to be modest and virtuous, and stresses that she should obey her husband. The content has led to the suggestion that it was written pseudonymously by a man. On the other hand, the author of the letter does not suggest that a woman is naturally inferior or weak, or that she needs a man's rule to be virtuous.
