= Frances Egan =

American philosophy professor

Philosophical work
- Institutions: Rutgers University
- Main interests: Philosophy of mind, philosophy of psychology, cognitive science, psychological explanation

Frances Egan is a professor of philosophy at Rutgers University. She has authored a number of articles and book chapters on philosophy of mind, philosophy of cognitive science, and perception.

== Education and career ==
Egan graduated from the University of Manitoba in 1976 with a B.A. in philosophy. She received a Ph.D. from the University of Western Ontario in 1988. She has taught at Rutgers University since her appointment as an assistant professor in 1990. Besides her Rutgers appointment, she is also an associate editor of Noûs, a quarterly journal of philosophy.

== Research areas ==
Egan's principal research interests are in philosophy of mind, philosophy of psychology, and foundations of cognitive science. Her work focuses on the nature of psychological explanation, and on the relationship between folk explanation and scientific explanation. She is known for her work on the role of representational content in computer models of mind. She argues that computational models of mind do not require meaning ascriptions, and that meaning ascriptions should be viewed as helping to connect the formal characterization of a computational theory with our intuitive belief that mental processes are intentional. She has also written on vision, including the history of vision.

== Awards and fellowships ==
Egan has received a number of awards including research fellowships at the Institute for Advanced Studies, Hebrew University of Jerusalem, and the Center for Interdisciplinary Research, Bielefeld, Germany. She is the recipient of the 2021 Jean Nicod Prize.
