= Lydia Goehr =

American philosopher (born 1960)

- Born: 10 January 1960 (age 66); London, England

Education
- Education: University of Cambridge (Ph.D.)
- Thesis: The work of music (1987)
- Doctoral advisor: Bernard Williams

Philosophical work
- Institutions: University of Maryland; University of Nevada at Reno; Boston University; Harvard University; Wesleyan University; Columbia University; Freie Universität Berlin; University of Hamburg; University of California, Berkeley
- Main interests: History of aesthetic theory, philosophy of music, philosophy of art, critical theory
- Notable works: The Imaginary Museum of Musical Works: an Essay in the Philosophy of Music (Oxford, 1992); The Quest for Voice: Music, Politics, and the Limits of Philosophy (Oxford and Berkeley, 1998); Elective Affinities: Musical Essays on the History of Aesthetic Theory (Columbia University Press, 2008)

Lydia Goehr (born January 10, 1960) is an American philosopher and musicologist. She is the Fred and Fannie Mack Professor of Humanities, Department of Philosophy, at Columbia University. Her research specialties include the philosophy of music, aesthetics, critical theory, the philosophy of history, and 19th- and 20th-century philosophy.

== Early life and education ==
Goehr was born on January 10, 1960, in London, daughter of composer Alexander Goehr and granddaughter of Walter Goehr and photographer Laelia Goehr. She received her Ph.D. from Cambridge University, where Bernard Williams supervised her dissertation on the ontology of music.

== Career ==
In addition to her permanent appointment at Columbia, Goehr has accepted a number of visiting appointments, including a position as Visiting Ernest Bloch Professor at UC Berkeley's music department in 1997, as the visiting Aby Warburg Professor at the University of Hamburg in 2002–2003, as a visiting professor at the Freie Universität in Berlin in 2008, and as a visiting professor in the FU Berlin SFB Theater und Fest in 2009.

Goehr's work focuses on the history of aesthetic theory, attempting to understand the relational nature of norms and power dynamics with the structure that confines them and regulates their practice. Most of her work has focused on the musical arts, and some of it has explored the complicated and often hostile relationship between the various arts, and between the arts and philosophy and religion. She has also engaged with ideas about violence in the arts from a critical theory standpoint, as well as dealt with the philosophy of history and the history of philosophy.

== Awards ==
Goehr has received several awards for her research as well as for her teaching of undergraduate students and mentoring of graduate students. She has been a recipient of the Getty and Guggenheim Fellowships. In 2012, Goehr was awarded the H. Colin Slim Award by the American Musicological Society. In 2009/2010, Goehr received a Lenfest Distinguished Columbia Faculty Award. In 2005, Goehr was a winner of the Columbia University Presidential Award for Outstanding Teaching.

== Publications ==
Goehr has written four books, co-edited two more, and has published numerous articles in the philosophy of music and critical theory. Her first book, The Imaginary Museum of Musical Works: An Essay in the Philosophy of Music (Clarendon Press, Oxford), was published in 1992, and has since been translated into many languages. Her second book, A Quest for Voice: On Music, Politics, and the Limits of Philosophy (Clarendon Press, Oxford), is based on the Bloch Lectures, delivered at the University of California, Berkeley in 1997. Her third book, published in 2008, is Elective Affinities: Musical Essays on the History of Aesthetic Theory (Columbia University Press). Her fourth book, published 2021 (Oxford University Press) is Red Sea - Red Square - Red Thread. A Philosophical Detective Story. She is co-editor with Daniel Herwitz of The Don Giovanni Moment. Essays on the Legacy of an Opera; and with Jonathan Gilmore, of the Wiley-Blackwell Companion to Arthur C. Danto.
