= Jennifer Whiting =

American philosopher

Jennifer E. Whiting

Education
- Thesis: Individual forms in Aristotle (1984)
- Doctoral advisor: T. H. Irwin

Philosophical work
- Institutions: University of Pittsburgh
- Main interests: Metaphysics, ethics, philosophy of mind, ancient philosophy

Jennifer Elaine Whiting is an American philosopher who teaches at the University of Pittsburgh. She has also taught at Harvard University and Cornell University, and was (from 2003 to 2015) Chancellor Jackman Professor of Philosophy at the University of Toronto.

== Education ==
Whiting earned a B.A. in philosophy at Franklin & Marshall College in 1978, receiving the Williamson Medal, the highest honor awarded by the faculty, for "character, leadership, and scholarship." She was a member of Franklin and Marshall's first women's squash team, lettered all four years, was MVP her junior and senior years, and achieved Honorable Mention All-American status in 1978. She was later inducted into Franklin and Marshall's Athletic Hall of Fame, partly on the basis of her subsequent record. She was ranked for three consecutive years by the United States Squash Racquets Association among the nation's top twenty women, placing 19th in 1979 (when she lost to Diana Nyad in the first round of the Women's National Tournament), 15th in 1980, and 10th in 1981 (when she finished eighth in the National Tournament).

Whiting did graduate work in Philosophy at Cornell, earning an M.A. in 1981 and a Ph.D. in 1984 (with a dissertation on Individual Forms in Aristotle, supervised by T.H. Irwin).

== Career ==
She was assistant professor of philosophy at Harvard from 1983 to 1986, then moved to the University of Pittsburgh, where she was granted tenure in 1991. She left for Cornell in 1997, and moved from there to the University of Toronto in 2003. She returned to Pittsburgh in 2015.

Whiting has been a fellow at Stanford's Center for Advanced Study in the Behavioral Sciences and Cornell's Society for Humanities. She has also received fellowships from the ACLS, the Howard Foundation, and the NEH; was co-director (with psychologist Louis Sass of Rutgers) of an NEH Summer Institute on Mind, Self, and Psychopathology; and co-director (with her Pittsburgh colleague Stephen Engstrom) of an NEH conference that led to the publication of their co-edited volume: Aristotle, Kant, and the Stoics: Rethinking Happiness and Duty (Cambridge UP, 1996).

In 2007, Whiting received the Konrad Adenauer Research Award, given annually by the Alexander von Humboldt Association, in cooperation with the Royal Society of Canada, to recognize "the entire academic record to date of an internationally renowned Canadian researcher in the Humanities or Social Sciences". She spent 2007-08 doing research at the Humboldt University in Berlin, where she also co-taught a summer seminar on Aristotle's Hylomorphism with faculty from Berlin, Oxford, Paris and Edinburgh. In 2014, she was made an Honorary Doctor of Science at Franklin and Marshall.

== Research areas ==
Whiting has lectured widely in North America and Europe. Though her teaching interests range widely, and include Philosophy and Literature as well as Feminism, her publications are divided mainly between work in ancient philosophy and work on contemporary issues at the intersection of ethics, metaphysics, and philosophy of mind. Though most of her work in ancient philosophy has been on Aristotle, she has recently started to work on Plato, and published a radical re-reading of his allegedly tripartite psychology: "Psychic Contingency in the Republic" (in Plato on the Divided Self, Barney, Brennan, and Brittain eds., Oxford UP 2013).

Whiting's work on personal identity takes concern for one's future selves as a component of psychological continuity, and has been reprinted (alongside of work on that topic by philosophers ranging from Plato and Locke through Derek Parfit and Thomas Nagel) in a highly acclaimed anthology of readings in Metaphysics. She has worked closely with Sydney Shoemaker, and was co-editor (with Richard Moran and Alan Sidelle) of a double-issue of Philosophical Topics devoted to his work. She also worked closely with Annette Baier and has published two pieces celebrating Baier's career. One piece, drawing on the work of Virginia Woolf, appears in a volume Whiting co-edited with two of Baier's former students on whose committees she also served (Joyce Jenkins and Christopher Williams).

Oxford University Press is publishing three volumes of Whiting's papers. First, Second, and Other Selves: Essays on Friendship and Personal Identity is in press and scheduled to appear in May 2016. Thinking and Acting Together: Essays on Aristotle’s Ethics is scheduled to appear in 2017, with Body and Soul: Essays on Aristotle’s Hylomorphism following in 2018.
