= Charlotte Witt =

American philosopher

Philosophical work
- Institutions: University of New Hampshire, University of Uppsala, Wayne State University
- Main interests: Ancient philosophy, metaphysics, feminist theory

Charlotte Witt (born 27 September 1951) is an emeritus professor of philosophy and humanities at the University of New Hampshire.

== Education and career ==
Witt double majored at Swarthmore College, graduating in 1975 with degrees both classics and philosophy. She went on to receive her master's and doctorate in philosophy from Georgetown University in 1978 and 1980, respectively.

Witt is a Professor Emeritus of philosophy and the humanities at the University of New Hampshire, where she chaired the philosophy department from 2000 to 2003. In addition, she previously held appointments as a Visiting Professor at the University of Uppsala, and Assistant Professor at Wayne State University.

== Research areas ==
Witt's research has generally focused on ancient philosophy, metaphysics and feminist theory. She has written extensively about the metaphysics of gender, about Aristotle (especially about Aristotelian metaphysics,) and feminist metaphysics. She has also written and spoken about the relationship between feminist philosophy and the traditional philosophical canon, arguing that feminist philosophy's enduring interest in the canon has been a process of historical self-justification (that is, justifying why feminist philosophy should exist,) and argues further that this is a process nearly identical to that that other emergent disciplines of philosophy undertook as they emerged. She has also published on the philosophy of adoption and the family.

Writing in 1993 in A Mind of One's Own: Feminist Essays on Reason and Objectivity, Witt described herself as subscribing, at least in part, to traditional philosophical paradigms that have found themselves under "feminist attack".

== Publications ==
Witt has written four books: Substance and Essence in Aristotle (published in 1989), Ways of Being: Potentiality and Actuality in Aristotle's Metaphysics (2003), The Metaphysics of Gender (published in 2010), and Social Goodness: The Ontology of Social Norms (published in 2023). She has also edited several volumes, including A Mind of One's Own: Feminist Essays on Reason and Objectivity (1992; revised and expanded second edition, 2001) and Adoption Matters: Feminist and Philosophical Essays (2005).

=== Ways of Being: Potentiality and Actuality in Aristotle's Metaphysics ===
Ways of Being: Potentiality and Actuality in Aristotle's Metaphysics is focused on Aristotle's discussion of potentiality and actuality, found in Metaphysics IX. Witt argues that Metaphysics IX is not intended as a sequel to earlier books, but can stand on its own, since it contains a coherent argument (framed around an examination of different ways of existing) that is aimed at achieving a separate goal from the other volumes of Aristotle's Metaphysics. Witt points to textual evidence in Metaphysics IX and earlier volumes in support of this claim, specifically the fact that Aristotle's earlier discussions of potentiality and actuality (found in Metaphysics VIII) are never linked to the discussion of those concepts in Metaphysics IX, the fact that Metaphysics IX differs significantly in topic from its predecessors, the fact that the view of reality portrayed in Metaphysics IX can only be understood within the framework provided by Metaphysics IX and the fact that, at the start of Metaphysics IX Aristotle states that he has finished his discussion of kinds of beings and will now move on to discuss ways of being.

=== The Metaphysics of Gender ===
In The Metaphysics of Gender, Witt takes a strong stance in favor of gender essentialism, arguing that gender is the fundamental unifying trait that creates and unifies all other social roles that people occupy, thus making gender essential to identity, and all other traits subsidiary. Witt argues that the proper role of feminism, rather than abolishing gender roles or simply giving women more choices, should be to reconfigure gender roles so that they are no longer oppressive to women.
