= Martha Klein =

British philosopher

Martha Klein is a philosopher specialising in the intersection between the philosophy of mind and moral philosophy, especially the question of free will. After a period as lecturer in philosophy at Christ Church, Oxford, Klein was elected a Fellow of Pembroke College, Oxford; she retired in 2006. Her research interests are in free will, moral responsibility, and moral psychology.

== Publications ==
- Determinism, Blameworthiness, and Deprivation (1990; Oxford:Clarendon Press. ISBN 0-19-824834-2)
- "Morality and Justice in Kant" (1990: in Ratio)
- "Externalism, Content, and Causation" (1996: in Proceedings of the Aristotelian Society)
- "Free Will" (1998: in A. Montefiore & V. Muresan (edd) British Moral Philosophy; published in Romania as "Libertatea vointea" in Filosofia Morala Britanica, 1998)
- "Praise and Blame" (1998: in E. Craig (ed.) Routledge Encyclopedia of Philosophy Volume VII)
