= Elsie Whetnall =

British philosopher

Elsie Matilda Maude Whetnall (24 December 1897, in Isleworth, Middlesex – c. 1998) was a British analytic philosopher.

== Life and career ==
Elsie Whetnall was the daughter of Thomas William Ward Whetnall, a staff officer for the Board of Education, and Emma Cox. She was educated at Southall County Secondary School, then at Bedford College, London University, where she obtained a first-class degree in 1921. Whetnall was an external doctoral student of Susan Stebbing, at Bedford College where she wrote her thesis on the theory of symbols. They were friends, and Stebbing, in the preface to her book A Modern Introduction to Logic (1930), wrote: "...in personal discussion I owe more than I can say to my friend, Miss E.M. Whetnall".

Whetnall was a non-resident Director of Studies and Lecturer in Moral Sciences (philosophy) for Girton College and Newnham College. She attended Girton College, Cambridge as a Jex-Blake student between 1924 and 1926. While at Cambridge, she was one of the first woman officers in the Moral Sciences Club, in her role as club secretary for a paper Bertrand Russell delivered on 3 December 1926.

After completing her doctorate in 1929, Whetnall subsequently held a number of teaching posts: first at Kingsley School, Hampstead, then as a lecturer at Huguenot College, University of South Africa. She returned to Bedford College as Stebbing's temporary replacement during 1930 and 1931 She also taught at the Hillcroft College for Working Women, Surbiton, a women's residential college from 1932 to 1943.

In 1925, she became one of very few women to be elected to the membership of the Aristotelian Society and was an active member and frequent panel discussant in the company of other notable panellists including G.E. Moore, John Wisdom, C.D. Broad, and Stace. In the early 1930s she considered metaphysical analysis to be useful for considering the psychological process of concept formation. She contributed to works on logic such as the revised edition of James Welton's An Intermediate Logic.

Whetnall married William James Smith on 30 August 1939.

== Publications ==
- (1928). "Symbol Situations". Proceedings of the Aristotelian Society 29:191-226.
- (1931). "Formation of Concepts and Metaphysical Analysis". Proceedings of the Aristotelian Society 32:121-138.
