= Naomi Scheman =

American philosopher

- Born: Naomi Beth Scheman

Philosophical work
- Institutions: University of Minnesota, Umeå University, University of Ottawa, Columbia University, University of Gothenburg, Center for Advanced Feminist Studies
- Main interests: Politics of epistemology, feminist theory, trustworthiness and community engagement, gender studies, queer studies, transgender studies

Naomi Scheman is a former Professor of Philosophy and Gender, Women's and Sexuality Studies at the University of Minnesota. She is also a former guest professor at the Umeå Center for Gender Studies in Sweden. Scheman was one of the first scholars to bring Wittgenstein's thoughts in to feminist philosophy.

== Early life and education ==
Scheman was born in Brooklyn and is of Jewish ancestry. She received her bachelor's in philosophy from Barnard College in 1968. She went on to receive a master's and doctorate in philosophy from Harvard University, in 1971 and 1978, respectively.

== Career ==
Scheman is currently a professor at University of Minnesota, and a guest professor at Umeå University. During her time at the University of Minnesota, she served as the chair of the Gender, Women's, and Sexuality Studies department from 1986 to 1989, and has served as the Director of Graduate Studies since 2007. Prior to her current positions, Scheman has held appointments at the University of Ottawa, Columbia University, the Center for Advanced Feminist Studies (including serving as director from 1991 to 1992 and associate dean of the graduate school from 2000 to 2003,) and the University of Gothenburg.

Scheman also serves as a member of the editorial boards of Hypatia: A Journal of Feminist Philosophy and NORA (the Nordic Women's Studies Journal). She also served as an associate editor of Signs between 1990 and 1993.

=== Research areas ===
Scheman was one of the first academics to read Wittgenstein in a feminist light, and, likewise, was one of the first academics to bring Wittgenstein's ideas to feminism. Much of Scheman's work has centered around the implications of the interactions between ontology and epistemology. Scheman is especially interested in the ways in which transgressive practices shine light on the actions of normatively centered people, and on how insights gleaned from these observations allow for the chance of acting differently. Scheman is also a strong believer that phenomena such as race and class are socially constructed, and is a strong opponent of physicalism.

== Publications ==
Scheman has written four books: Engenderings: Constructions of Knowledge, Authority, and Privilege in 1993, Is Academic Feminism Dead? in 2000, Feminist Interpretations of Wittgenstein in 2002, and most recently Shifting Ground: Knowledge & Reality, Transgression & Trust in 2011. She has also written a significant number of peer-reviewed papers, as well as a number of articles, commentaries, and presentations including.

=== Engenderings: Constructions of Knowledge, Authority, and Privilege ===
In Engenderings: Constructions of Knowledge, Authority, and Privilege, Scheman critiques aspects of modern philosophy that serve or reinforce injustice. The book is structured as a collection of essays. She focuses especially on modern philosophy's apparent disdain for the body from which it, by necessity, sprung, and attempts to reground philosophy in the physical bodies and relationships it arose from. Much of Engenderings draws on Scheman's personal experience as a woman philosopher, attempting to figure out how to occupy the role of 'woman philosopher' while making as few concessions to the culture of intellectual privilege that led her to occupy that identity in the first place as possible.

=== Chapters in books ===
- Scheman, Naomi (2009), "Narrative, complexity, and context: autonomy as an epistemic value", in Lindemann, Hilde; Verkerk, Marian; Walker, Margaret Urban (eds.), Naturalized bioethics: toward responsible knowing and practice, Cambridge New York: Cambridge University Press, pp. 106–124, ISBN 9780521719407.
