= Inquiry: An Interdisciplinary Journal of Philosophy =

Inquiry
- Discipline: Philosophy
- Language: English
- Edited by: Herman Cappelen

Publication details
- History: 1958–present
- Publisher: Routledge (Norway)
- Frequency: Bimonthly
- Impact factor: 1.079 (2015)

Standard abbreviations
- ISO 4: Inquiry

Indexing
- ISSN: 0020-174X (print); 1502-3923 (web)
- LCCN: 98658211
- OCLC no.: 1591883

Links
- Journal homepage; Online access; Online archive

Inquiry: An Interdisciplinary Journal of Philosophy is a bimonthly peer-reviewed academic journal of philosophy published by Routledge. It was established in 1958 by Ingemund Gullvåg and Jacob Meløe in the spirit of Arne Naess and the so-called Oslo school in Norwegian philosophy and covers all areas of philosophy. It was originally published by Universitetsforlaget.

== Abstracting and indexing ==
Inquiry is abstracted and indexed in Arts and Humanities Citation Index, Current Contents/Arts & Humanities, Humanities Index, International Bibliography of the Social Sciences, Philosopher's Index, Social Sciences Citation Index, and Sociological Abstracts. According to meta-rankings by de Bruin (2023), Inquiry was ranked 15th among generalist philosophy journals.

== See also ==
- List of ethics journals
- List of philosophy journals
