= List of feminist philosophers =

This is a list of feminist philosophers, that is, people who theorize about gender issues and female perspectives in different areas of philosophy.

== A ==
- Carol Adams
- Jane Addams
- Alicia Gaspar de Alba
- Linda Martín Alcoff
- Alia Al-Saji
- Amy Allen
- Elizabeth Anderson
- Pamela Sue Anderson
- Gloria E. Anzaldúa
- Hannah Arendt
- Mary Astell

== B ==
- Sandra Bartky
- Nancy Bauer
- Simone de Beauvoir
- Seyla Benhabib
- Peg Birmingham
- Susan Bordo
- Chiara Bottici
- Rosi Braidotti
- Samantha Brennan
- Wendy Brown
- Susan Brownmiller
- Judith Butler

== C ==
- Joan Callahan
- Adriana Cavarero
- Margaret Cavendish
- Claudia Card
- Ruth Chang
- Nancy Chodorow
- Hélène Cixous
- Lorraine Code
- Patricia Hill Collins
- Drucilla Cornell
- Alice Crary
- Ann Cudd
- Chris Cuomo
- Jean Curthoys

== D ==
- Mary Daly
- Angela Y. Davis
- Donna Dickenson
- Penelope Deutscher
- Andrea Dworkin

== E ==
- Bracha Ettinger

== F ==
- Anne Fausto-Sterling
- Carla Fehr
- Shulamith Firestone
- Nancy Fraser
- Miranda Fricker
- Betty Friedan
- Marilyn Friedman
- Marilyn Frye

== G ==
- Ann Garry
- Ivone Gebara
- Carol Gilligan
- Kathryn Gines
- Emma Goldman
- Olympe de Gouges
- Germaine Greer
- Lisa Guenther

== H ==
- Donna Haraway
- Sandra Harding
- Nancy Hartsock
- Sally Haslanger
- Virginia Held
- Cressida Heyes
- Nancy Holland
- Bonnie Honig
- Gillian Howie
- bell hooks
- Hypatia

== I ==
- Luce Irigaray

== J ==
- Alison Jaggar
- Grace Jantzen

== K ==
- Evelyn Fox Keller
- Serene Khader
- Eva Feder Kittay
- Sarah Kofman
- Christine Koggel
- Julia Kristeva

== L ==
- Rae Helen Langton
- Hilde Lindemann
- Michèle Le Dœuff
- Genevieve Lloyd
- Helen Longino
- Judith Lorber
- Audre Lorde

== M ==
- Catharine Macaulay
- Catharine MacKinnon
- Noëlle McAfee
- Mary Kate McGowan
- Peggy McIntosh
- Shelbi Nahwilet Meissner
- Diana Tietjens Meyers
- Harriet Taylor Mill
- Kate Millett
- Trinh T. Minh-ha
- Cherríe Moraga
- Chantal Mouffe
- Judith Sargent Murray

== N ==
- Uma Narayan
- Kathryn Norlock
- Martha Nussbaum
- Andrea Nye
- Noëlle McAfee

== O ==
- Peg O'Connor
- Susan Moller Okin
- Kelly Oliver

== P ==
- Carole Pateman
- L.A. Paul
- Paul B. Preciado

== R ==
- Adrienne Rich
- Avital Ronell
- Hilary Rose

== S ==
- Jennifer Saul
- Naomi Scheman
- Sally Scholz
- Ofelia Schutte
- Vandana Shiva
- Dorothy Smith
- Holly Martin Smith
- Nancy Snow
- Miriam Solomon
- Elizabeth V. Spelman
- Gayatri Chakravorty Spivak
- Alison Stone
- Shannon Sullivan
- Anita Superson
- Susanne Sreedhar

== T ==
- Lisa Tessman
- Lynne Tirrell
- Sojourner Truth

== W ==
- Margaret Urban Walker
- Georgia Warnke
- Anna Wheeler
- Cynthia Willett
- Charlotte Witt
- Mary Wollstonecraft
- Frances Wright
- Alison Wylie
- Monique Wittig

== Y ==
- Young, Iris Marion
- Yu, Cheng-hsieh

== Z ==
- Naomi Zack
- Ewa Ziarek
