= Hypatia transracialism controversy =

2017 academic dispute

- Hypatia's associate editors posted an unauthorized apology for the publication of one of its peer-reviewed articles.
- Date: From April 2017
- Event: Academic dispute
- Field: Feminist philosophy
- Disputed article: Rebecca Tuvel (Spring 2017). "In Defense of Transracialism". Hypatia: A Journal of Feminist Philosophy. 32 (2): 263–278. doi:10.1111/hypa.12327. S2CID 151630261.
- Publisher: Hypatia: A Journal of Feminist Philosophy, John Wiley & Sons
- Request for retraction: 29 April: Open letter requests retraction.; 30 April: Associate editors issue unauthorized apology.
- Journal response: 5 May: Editor-in-chief stands by article.; 18 May: Directors decline retraction request.; 20 July: Editor-in-chief resigns; directors suspend associate editors.
- Journal website: Hypatia website Wiley Hypatia page Cambridge Hypatia page

The feminist philosophy journal Hypatia became involved in a dispute in April 2017 that led to extensive criticism of an author of one of its articles, Rebecca Tuvel, an assistant professor of philosophy at Rhodes College in Memphis. The journal had published a peer-reviewed article by Tuvel in which she compared the situation of Caitlyn Jenner, a trans woman, to that of Rachel Dolezal, a white woman who identifies as black. When the article was criticized on social media, scholars associated with Hypatia joined in the criticism and urged the journal to retract it. The controversy exposed a rift within the journal's editorial team and more broadly within feminism and academic philosophy.

In the article—"In Defense of Transracialism", published in Hypatia's spring 2017 issue on 25 April—Tuvel argued that "since we should accept transgender individuals' decisions to change sexes, we should also accept transracial individuals' decisions to change races". After a small group on Facebook and Twitter criticized the article and attacked Tuvel, an open letter began circulating, naming one of Hypatia's editorial board as its point of contact and urging the journal to retract the article. The article's publication had sent a message, the letter said, that "white cis scholars may engage in speculative discussion of these themes" without engaging "theorists whose lives are most directly affected by transphobia and racism".

On 1 May the journal posted an apology on its Facebook page on behalf of "a majority" of Hypatia's associate editors. By the following day the open letter had 830 signatories, including scholars associated with Hypatia and two members of Tuvel's dissertation committee. Hypatia's editor-in-chief, Sally Scholz, and its board of directors stood by the article. When Scholz resigned in July 2017, the board suspended the associate editors' authority to appoint the next editor, in response to which eight associate editors resigned. The directors set up a task force to restructure the journal's governance. In February 2018 the directors themselves were replaced.

Some members of the academic community responded with support for Tuvel. The affair exposed fault lines within philosophy about peer review, analytic versus continental philosophy, diversity within the profession, who is deemed qualified to write about people's lived experience, the pressures of social media, and how to preserve the free exchange of ideas.

== Background ==
=== Hypatia ===
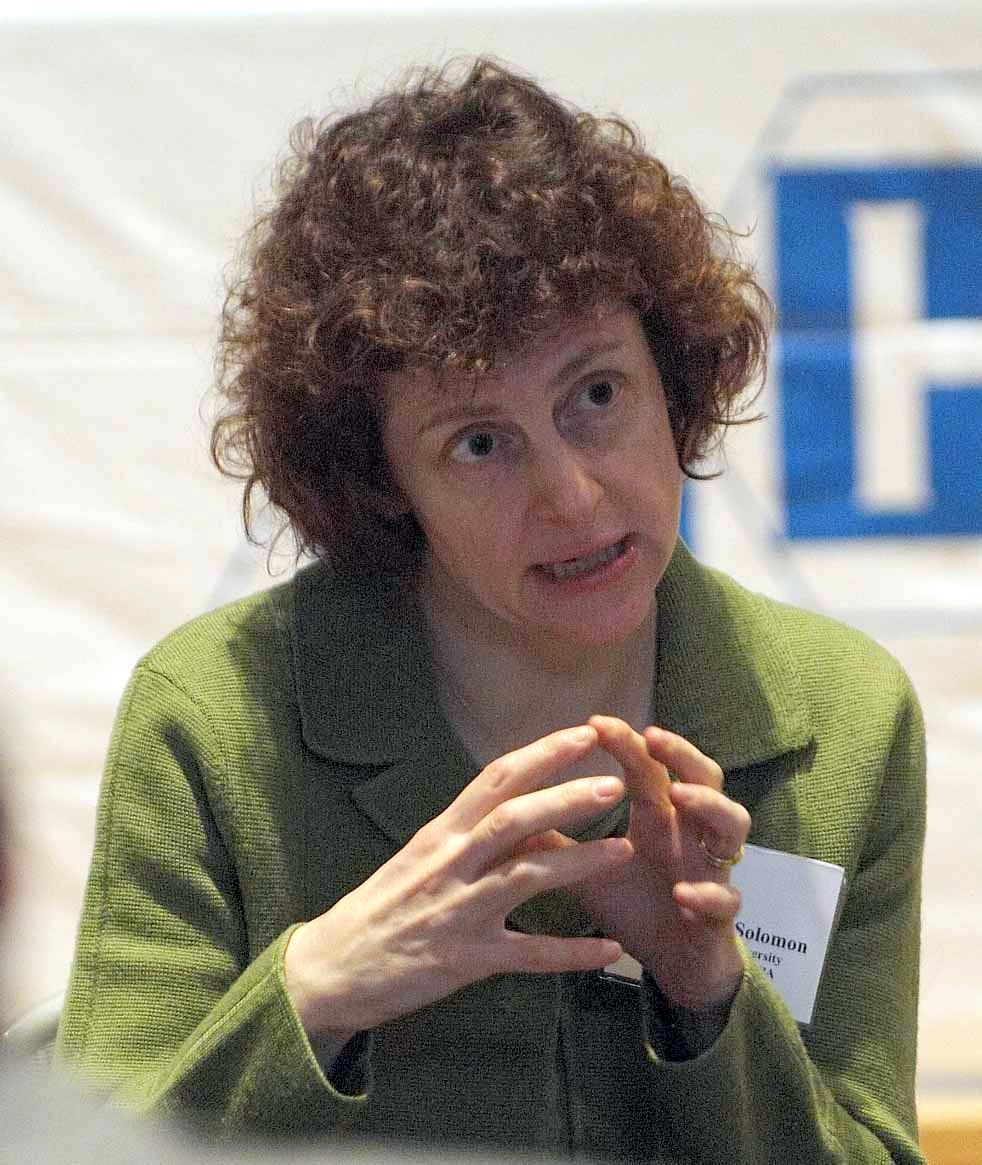
Miriam Solomon, president of Hypatia Inc.'s board of directors 2016–2018.

Founded in 1983 by Azizah Y. al-Hibri and the Society for Women in Philosophy, Hypatia is owned by a non-profit corporation, Hypatia Inc. At the time of the dispute in April 2017, the journal was published by John Wiley & Sons. Miriam Solomon (Temple) was president of the board of directors and Sally Scholz (Villanova) editor-in-chief. In addition to the directors and editorial staff, in April 2017 there was a 25-strong editorial board; a 10-member advisory board; 12 local editorial advisors; and a board of 10 associate editors. The associate editors, who appointed the editors-in-chief and advised on editorial policy, consisted of Linda Martín Alcoff (CUNY); Ann Cahill (Elon); Kim Hall (App State); Cressida Heyes (Alberta); Karen Jones (Melbourne); Kyoo Lee (John Jay); Mariana Ortega (John Carroll); Ásta Kristjana Sveinsdóttir (SFSU); Alison Wylie (Washington); and George Yancy (Emory).

=== Author ===
Rebecca Tuvel was born in Toronto to a Jewish family; her mother is a pharmacist and her father a dentist. Tuvel attributes her interest in justice partly to the loss of family members during the Holocaust; both her grandfathers were survivors. Specializing in feminist philosophy, the philosophy of race, and animal ethics, Tuvel obtained her BA from McGill University in 2007 and her PhD in 2014 from Vanderbilt University for a thesis entitled Epistemic Injustice Expanded: A Feminist, Animal Studies Approach. In 2014 she joined Rhodes College in Memphis, Tennessee, as an assistant professor of philosophy.

== "In Defense of Transracialism" ==
=== Jenner and Dolezal ===
Tuvel began writing the transracialism article after noticing the contrast between the reception given in 2015 to Caitlyn Jenner's coming out as a trans woman in April and that given in June to Rachel Dolezal, a white woman who identifies and had been passing as black. Jenner became one of Glamour magazine's Women of the Year and appeared on the cover of Vanity Fair, while Dolezal lost her position as president of the National Association for the Advancement of Colored People chapter in Spokane, Washington, and became, in her view, unemployable. Tuvel was not interested in the details of the cases but in their structure. She set about writing an argument in support of the position: "Since we should accept transgender individuals' decisions to change sexes, we should also accept transracial individuals' decisions to change races."

=== Arguments ===
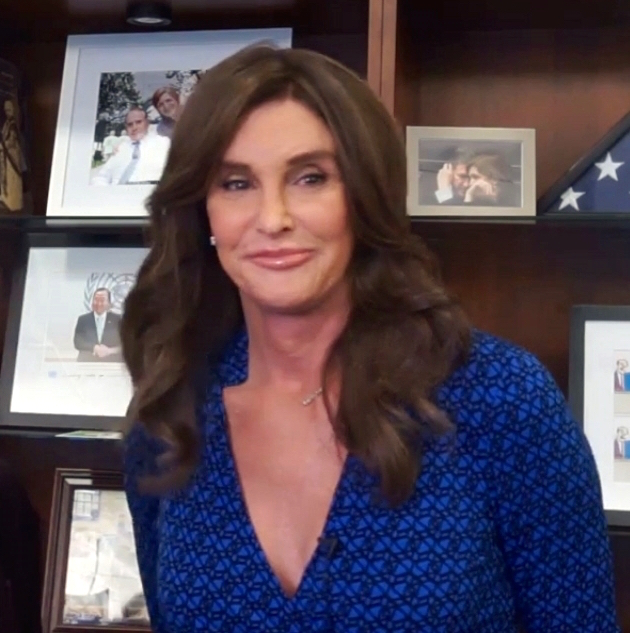
Caitlyn Jenner

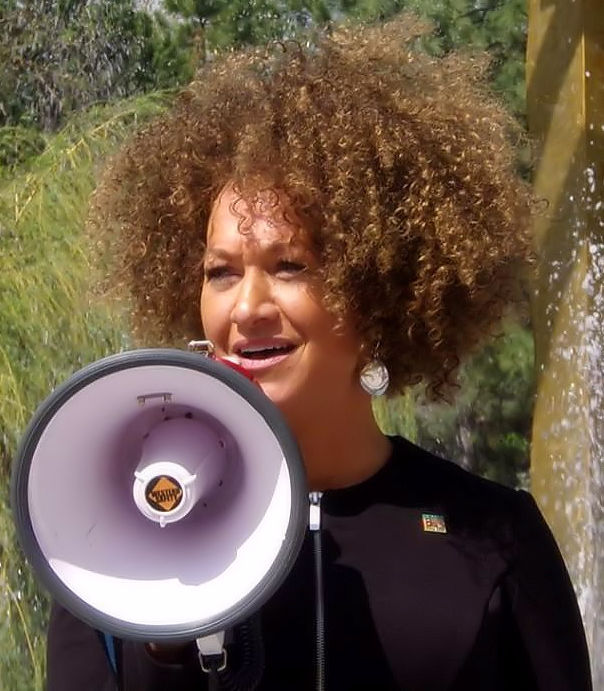
Rachel Dolezal

Tuvel suggests that "generally, we treat people wrongly when we block them from assuming the personal identity they wish to assume". Self-identification and social recognition of the new identity are the two components needed for a successful change. As an example, she offers conversion to Judaism; if there is no reason to block the conversion, such as the rabbi doubting the seriousness of the commitment, transition to the new identity will be accepted. Arguing for "an account of race that allows for racial membership on the basis of social treatment and ... self-identification", she maintains that race is a malleable social construct and that, while ancestry—a feature external to the body—is a highly valued determinant of race in America, its value varies elsewhere. In Brazil, for example, Dolezal's self-identification as black, her living as someone society had accepted as black, and her exposure to black culture would be enough to deem her black, according to Tuvel.

Tuvel addresses four objections to transracialism. First, a claim to be black requires the experience of having grown up with the suffering anti-black racism causes; the journalist Touré called this the "one thing that binds black people". That trans women are not raised with the suffering caused by sexism is not reason enough, Tuvel argues, to reject their identification as women. Therefore, in Tuvel's view, Dolezal's experience of racism while living as a black woman would be sufficient exposure. A second objection is that Dolezal cannot identify as black because of the importance placed in America on ancestry; no matter the facts, there is intersubjective agreement that ancestry matters. Tuvel argues there was also an intersubjective agreement that biology mattered in relation to trans people, both in America in the past, and in some countries even today. Therefore this objection from "intersubjective agreement" holds the possibility of change "hostage to the status quo".

Third, there is an objection that the black community is harmed when a white person seeks to enter it; Dolezal's passing as black was compared to blackface. Tuvel distinguishes between problematic and unproblematic identification. Dolezal's self-identification was not based on a change in physical appearance alone; there was nothing insulting about it; it did not appear to be temporary; there were no questionable ends; and there was no reinforcement of harmful stereotypes. It was therefore an example of unproblematic identification, Tuvel argues. A fourth objection is that Dolezal was engaged in a "wrongful exercise of white privilege": a white person can restore their white privilege whenever they need it, while a black person is denied this ease of movement. Tuvel writes that the same argument applies to trans women, especially before surgery; that someone could return to male privilege should not preclude their transition.

=== Peer review and publication ===
The paper thanks J. Baird Callicott (UNT), Andrew Forcehimes (NTU) and David Gray (UofM) for having read earlier drafts. Tuvel submitted the article to Hypatia on 12 February 2016, and on 26 February she presented it to a conference at the University of Waterloo. The manuscript was revised on 24 September and accepted for publication on 10 October 2016, after the standard double-blind peer review by at least two reviewers. (Note: Hypatia: "When an essay is submitted to Hypatia, the editors do an initial review to determine that it is appropriate for the journal; fewer than 10% of manuscripts are declined at this stage and only when two local board members concur. Drawing on Hypatia's extensive referee database, the editors then identify two reviewers with expertise appropriate to the essay and invite them to provide a detailed report on the manuscript and their recommendation for editorial decision. If the referees disagree in their assessment, the editors may request an additional report from a third reviewer. ... We make every effort to ensure the anonymity of both authors and referees.)

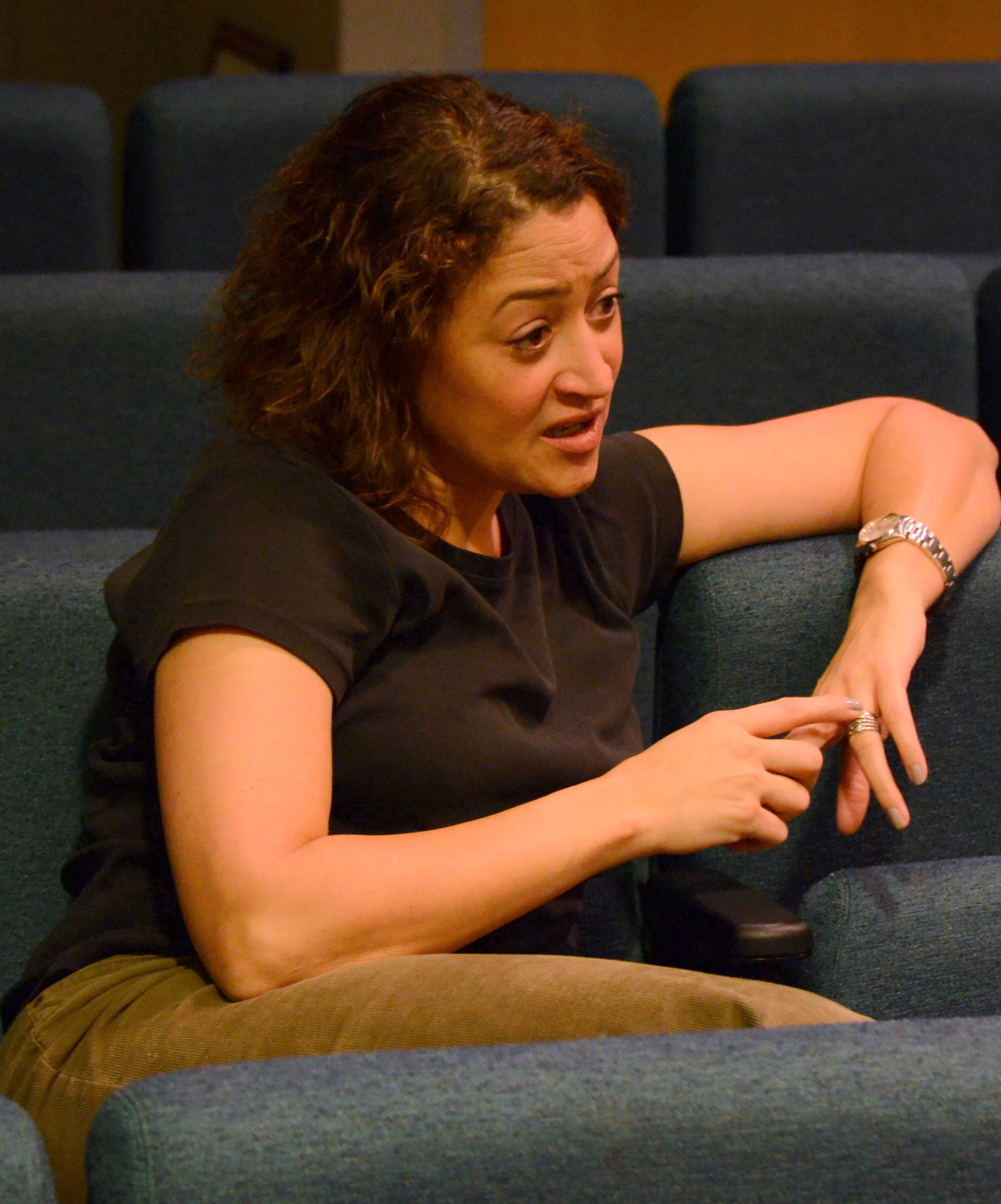
Tina Fernandes Botts

On 4 January 2017 Tuvel presented the paper to the American Philosophical Association Eastern Division. The scheduled commentators were Kris Sealey (Fairfield), a Hypatia reviewer in 2016, and Tina Fernandes Botts (Fresno State). Sealey's rebuttal included that the biology of race "is really about a relationship between actual genetic ancestry (on the one hand), and the cultural and social signification of that ancestry (on the other)". The role of ancestry is therefore not biological but cultural, she argued. She argued further that "the white person who attempts to shed her white identity becomes blind to the racial privilege that she cannot opt out of".

Botts did not attend the meeting but submitted a short reply, arguing that the contemporary understanding of race in the US sees it as an "identity marker based in ancestry", which unlike gender is not changeable; she called race "externally derived" and gender "internally derived". She presented a more detailed position at a Fresno State meeting in March and at the Res Philosophica conference in April. Hypatia made Tuvel's article available online on 29 March 2017 and included it in their spring issue on 25 April. It was published while Botts was at the Res Philosophica conference. There was support there for both Botts's and Tuvel's positions; according to Botts, the view was expressed that Tuvel's ideas were out of step with recent scholarship, but that she might be onto something in calling for the right to reject one's designated race.

== Social media response ==
=== Criticism ===
On 28 April 2017, Tuvel and the article were criticized on Facebook and Twitter. Tuvel was called transphobic, racist, crazy, and stupid, and was accused of having engaged in "epistemic violence". Several feminists referred to her as a "Becky". The article was called "violent", "crap", and "wack shit". The philosopher Kelly Oliver, who chaired Tuvel's dissertation committee in 2014, defended Tuvel on Facebook by asking for arguments rather than insults, and suggested that Hypatia invite critical responses. She was told her comments were "unforgivable" and that her suggestions were "doing violence" and triggering PTSD.

According to Oliver, several people associated with Hypatia joined in the criticism and apologized individually for the article. A friend of Oliver's described one of the Facebook apologies as "like something ISIS makes its captors read in a hostage video before beheading them". Dissenters were, allegedly, silenced or afraid to speak up; several people who wrote sympathetically to Tuvel in private attacked her in public. Others who posted criticism acknowledged privately that they had not read the article. A "senior feminist philosopher" telephoned Tuvel to remind her that she had to appeal to the "right people" to get tenure. Oliver writes: "Through every medium imaginable, senior feminist scholars were pressuring, even threatening, Tuvel that she wouldn't get tenure and her career would be ruined if she didn’t retract her article." Tuvel said that people were "absolutely vicious" toward her.

Nora Berenstain, assistant professor of philosophy at the University of Tennessee, wrote on Facebook on 29 April that the paper contained "egregious levels of liberal white ignorance and discursive transmisogynistic violence". (Note: Berenstain said that the term "violence" referred to "structural violence", which she described as "a range of systemic harms that go beyond direct interpersonal physical contact".) Criticizing Tuvel for failing to cite black women philosophers or black trans women, Berenstain objected to Tuvel's parenthetical reference to Jenner's former name (deadnaming) and her use of the terms "transgenderism", "biological sex" and "male genitalia". The paper's references to surgery, Berenstain wrote, objectified trans bodies, and its reference to "a male-to-female (mtf) trans individual who could return to male privilege" promoted "the harmful transmisogynistic ideology that trans women have (at some point had) male privilege".

=== Open letter ===
==== Signatories and objections ====
An open letter requesting a retraction appeared on 29 April 2017; its point of contact was Alexis Shotwell of Hypatia's editorial board. The letter had 130 signatories by 9 a.m. on 1 May, and 830 by the afternoon of 2 May. The top five signatories were Elise Springer (Wesleyan), Alexis Shotwell (Carleton), Dilek Huseyinzadegan (Emory), Lori Gruen (Wesleyan), and Shannon Winnubst (Ohio State). Two signatories, Gruen and Lisa Guenther (Vanderbilt), had been members of Tuvel's dissertation committee. Delivered on 2 May to Hypatia's editor-in-chief, the letter urged the journal to retract the article; avoid deadnaming; open its editorial procedures to scrutiny; release a statement about improving its review process; and undertake to involve in future "people targeted by transphobia and racism and scholars who specialize in the related relevant subfields of philosophy". It alleged of the article that:

1. It uses vocabulary and frameworks not recognized, accepted, or adopted by the conventions of the relevant subfields; for example, the author uses the language of "transgenderism" and engages in deadnaming a trans woman;

2. It mischaracterizes various theories and practices relating to religious identity and conversion; for example, the author gives an off-hand example about conversion to Judaism;

3. It misrepresents leading accounts of belonging to a racial group; for example, the author incorrectly cites Charles Mills as a defender of voluntary racial identification;

4. It fails to seek out and sufficiently engage with scholarly work by those who are most vulnerable to the intersection of racial and gender oppressions (women of color) in its discussion of “transracialism”. ...

==== Rebuttal ====
According to the philosopher Justin Weinberg, most of the letter's claims were false or arguable. GLAAD does caution against using the term transgenderism. The deadnaming consisted of Tuvel including Jenner's previous name in parentheses, a name Jenner herself refers to, Jesse Singal wrote. (Note: Caitlyn Jenner (2017): "Transgender guidelines suggest that I no longer be referred to as Bruce in any circumstance. Here are my guidelines: I will refer to the name Bruce when I think it appropriate and the name Caitlyn when I think it appropriate. Bruce existed for sixty-five years, and Caitlyn is just going on her second birthday. That's the reality.") Weinberg argued that it was unclear why the conversion example was deemed objectionable. Tuvel did not identify Charles Mills as a "defender of voluntary racial identification"; Weinberg wrote that this allegation was "just plain false". (Note: Tuvel (2017): "Charles Mills identifies at least five categories generally relevant to the determination of racial membership, including "self-awareness of ancestry, public awareness of ancestry, culture, experience, and self-identification" (Mills 1998, 50). If ancestry is a less emphasized feature in some places (for example, in Brazil), then Dolezal's exposure to black culture, experience living as someone read as black, and her self-identification could be sufficient to deem she is black in those places. And because there is no fact of the matter about her 'actual' race from a genetic standpoint, these features of Dolezal's experience would be decisive for determining her race in that particular context. The crucial point here is that no 'truth' about Dolezal's 'real' race would be violated.") The criticism that Tuvel did not cite enough women of color might be a fair point, according to Singal, but hardly sufficient to demand a retraction. Weinberg wrote that Tuvel's critics had failed to point out any work that was directly relevant and had been omitted. The philosopher Justin E. H. Smith described the claim that Tuvel did not cite the relevant literature as "fatuous nonsense": "None of the experts within the narrow community of scholars Tuvel was faulted for ignoring had themselves cited more than the tiniest fraction of potentially relevant literature ...".

=== Associate editors' apology ===
On 30 April 2017—two days before the open letter was delivered to Hypatia—Cressida Heyes, then one of Hypatia's 10 associate editors, posted a 1,000-word apology on her Facebook page from "We, the members of Hypatia's Board of Associate Editors". On 1 May it was reposted to Hypatia's Facebook page, this time from "a majority" of the associate editors. The apology stated: "We, the members of Hypatia's Board of Associate Editors, extend our profound apology to our friends and colleagues in feminist philosophy, especially transfeminists, queer feminists, and feminists of color, for the harms that the publication of the article on transracialism has caused." It continued that "clearly, the article should not have been published" and blamed the review process, which had exposed Tuvel to criticism that was "both predictable and justifiable". The associate editors had been asked but declined, the letter said, to name the anonymous reviewers.

== Reception ==
=== Author's statement ===
Tuvel issued a statement on 1 May 2017 saying she had written the article "from a place of support for those with non-normative identities", because she had perceived a "transphobic logic that lay at the heart" of the attacks against Dolezal. Citing scholars who have adopted sympathetic positions on transracialism, including Adolph L. Reed Jr. and Melissa Harris-Perry, she argued that failing to examine the issues would "reinforce gender and racial essentialism". She apologized for the reference to Jenner's previous name, which was removed from the article at her request on 4 May. Regarding the personal attacks, she wrote that commentators had warned her that failing to retract the article would be devastating for her "personally, professionally, and morally". She argued that "critical thought is in danger" and that "the last place one expects to find such calls for censorship rather than discussion is amongst philosophers".

=== Hypatia response ===
Sally Scholz, the editor-in-chief, called the associate editors' repudiation of the article "utterly inappropriate". (Note: Sally J. Scholz (6 May 2017): "As Editor of an academic journal that espouses pluralism and diversity, I believe that Hypatia should publish on a wide array of topics employing a wide array of methodologies. I believe that a community of scholars should contest concepts and engage in dialogue within the pages of the journal to advance our collective project of educating—students and ourselves. I believe that an academic journal is not a blog or a discussion board. "I firmly believe, and this belief will not waver, that it is utterly inappropriate for editors to repudiate an article they have accepted for publication (barring issues of plagiarism or falsification of data). In this respect, editors must stand behind the authors of accepted papers. That is where I stand. Professor Tuvel's paper went through the peer review process and was accepted by the reviewers and by me. "The Associate Editorial board acted independently in drafting and posting their statement. That board is a policy board and plays no role in the day to day management of the Journal. "Since April 30, I have been working with the publisher, Wiley, to respond responsibly and appropriately. We have consulted with the corporation which owns Hypatia and, together, we are proceeding to refer the situation to Committee on Publication Ethics (COPE) for guidance.") Scholz was supported by Miriam Solomon, president of Hypatia Inc.'s board of directors. The journal referred the matter to the Committee on Publication Ethics. On 18 May the board issued a statement with a mixed message. Signed by Elizabeth Anderson, Leslie Francis, Heidi Grasswick, Miriam Solomon, and Lisa Tessman, it dismissed the view that objections to the article were too minor to have triggered such a response; that view reflects "ignorance of the cumulative history of marginalization ... of oppressed groups". Condemning the personal attacks on Tuvel, the directors said they stood behind the editor-in-chief, that the associate editors had apologized without adequate consultation, and that the article would not be retracted. The associate editors' apology on Hypatia's Facebook page was updated to say that it did not represent the views of the editor or board of directors.

=== Academic response ===
Two popular philosophy blogs, Justin Weinberg's Daily Nous and Brian Leiter's Leiter Reports, came out in support of Tuvel. Leiter wrote that he had "never seen anything like this in academic philosophy". Mark Newman, chair of the Rhodes College philosophy department where Tuvel teaches, expressed the department's "complete and unconditional support" for her. Paul Bloom called the episode "a bizarre and ugly attack". The associate editors' letter had twisted the concept of harm "beyond all recognition", according to the philosopher José Luis Bermúdez.

Commentators blamed social media's "cancel culture" for the speed with which the dispute unfolded. In the view of Suzanna Danuta Walters, editor-in-chief of the feminist journal Signs, the associate editors had undermined "the whole process of peer review and the principles of scholarly debate". The philosopher Dan Kaufman blamed the profession's "increasing obsession with identity politics" and "purity-purges". Rogers Brubaker, author of Trans: Gender and Race in an Age of Unsettled Identities (2016), described as "epistemological insiderism" the idea that as a white cisgender woman Tuvel had no standing to argue about transgender or transracial issues. There had been tension for some time between Hypatia and women-of-color philosophers, who believed the journal did not take their work seriously, according to Tina Fernandes Botts. Botts was critical of the Hypatia peer-review process, which she said had allowed the paper to be published without ensuring that it was "situated within contemporary scholarly discussions".

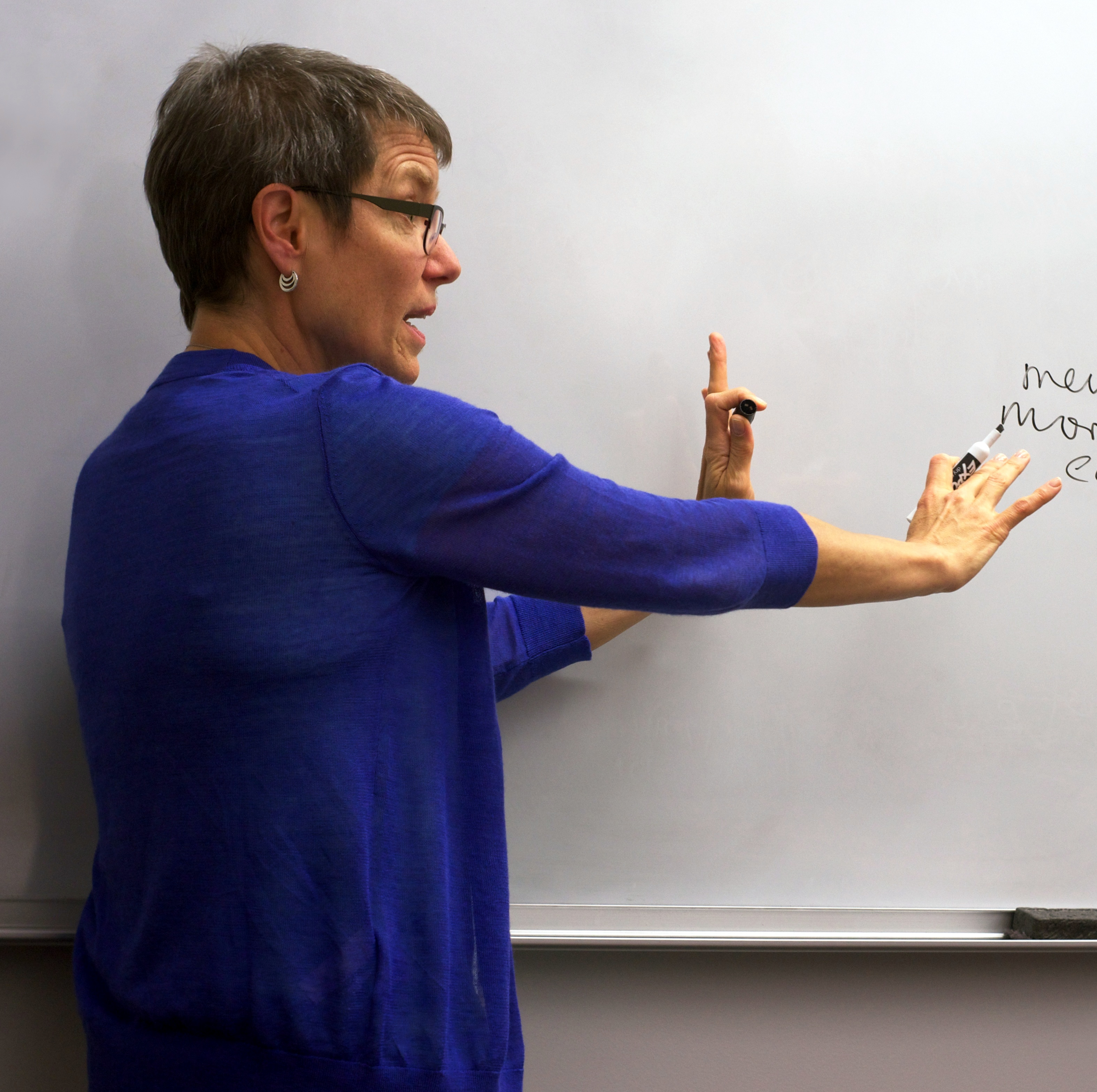
Sally Haslanger

Sally Haslanger, later co-chair of Hypatia's governance task force, complained about poor working conditions and the narrow focus of philosophy journals; she wrote that there are days she can "hardly stand the arrogance, the ignorance, the complacency, in short, the bullshit, of the profession". The situation was not Tuvel's fault; she had been unfairly targeted, in Haslanger's view. Of 13,000 professional philosophers in the United States in 2013, she wrote, only 55 were black women and 30 percent of those were PhD students. Citing sexual harassment complaints and figures showing that, in 2016, 75 percent of American Philosophical Society members identified as male and 80 percent white, Shannon Winnubst, editor of PhiloSOPHIA and one of the open letter's top signatories, wrote that the publication of Tuvel's article had brought "all of the systemic problems" of philosophy and feminist philosophy to a head.

Philosophy Today published a symposium on Tuvel's article in its Winter 2018 edition, with contributions from Chloë Taylor (UofA), Lewis Gordon (UConn), Kris Sealey (Fairfield), Sabrina Hom (GCSU), Tina Fernandes Botts (Fresno State), and Tuvel. Tuvel's contribution includes responses to Sealey's and Botts' critiques.

=== Hypatia resignations ===
The Committee on Publication Ethics (COPE) reported in July 2017 that the associate editors' apology had been inappropriate, and that, when responding to an external complaint about a journal article, an internal inquiry should be held prior to a public response. The associate editors apparently refused to accept the report's conclusions. On 20 July Hypatia announced the resignation of Sally Scholz, the editor-in-chief, and Shelley Wilcox, editor of Hypatia Reviews Online. They also announced that a task force would restructure the journal's governance, and that anyone holding an editorial or non-board position with Hypatia would be "required to sign a statement of adherence" to COPE guidelines.

According to a statement from the associate editors, the board asked them, on 17 July, to resign or it would suspend the journal's governance documents, thereby removing the associate editors' authority to choose the next editor. Eight of the associate editors resigned. In a resignation letter, they argued that feminist philosophy had an ethical commitment to transform philosophy into "a discipline that honors the perspectives and welcomes the scholarly contributions of historically marginalized groups, including people of color, trans* people, disabled people, and queer people".

Sally Haslanger, Serene Khader, and Yannik Thiem were appointed as co-chairs of the governance task force and Ann Garry, Serene Khader, and Alison Stone as interim editors. In February 2018 the five-person board of directors was replaced. Linda Martín Alcoff and Kim Hall, two of the associate editors who resigned in July, became, respectively, president of the board of directors and chair of the search committee for the new editorial team. As of March 2020, the journal was led by four co-editors, Bonnie J. Mann, Erin McKenna, Camisha Russell, and Rocío Zambrana, and published by Cambridge University Press.

== See also ==
- Critical race theory
- Identity politics
- Intersectionality
- Jessica Krug
