= Transracial (identity) =

Cultural identity

Transracial is a label used by people who identify as a different race than the one they were born into. They may adjust their appearance to make themselves look more like that race, and may participate in activities associated with that race.

== History and usage ==
Historically, the term transracial was used solely to describe parents who adopt a child of a different race.

The use of the term to describe changing racial identity has been criticized by members of the transracial adoption community. Kevin H. Vollmers, executive director of an adoption non-profit, said the term is being "appropriated and co-opted", and that this is a "slap in the face" to transracial adoptees. In June 2015, about two dozen transracial adoptees, transracial parents and academics published an open letter in which they condemned the new usage as "erroneous, ahistorical, and dangerous".

In April 2017, the feminist philosophy journal Hypatia published an academic paper in support of recognizing transracialism and drawing parallels between transracial and transgender identity. Publication of this paper resulted in considerable controversy. The subject was also explored in Trans: Gender and Race in an Age of Unsettled Identities, a 2016 book by UCLA sociology professor Rogers Brubaker, who argues that the phenomenon, though offensive to many, is psychologically real to many people, and has many examples throughout history. Transracialism has also been defended by the philosopher Andy Lamey, who argued in a 2025 article that accepting transracialism does not entail accepting "trans-speciesism" and other absurd outcomes suggested by critics.

== Examples ==
- Rachel Dolezal, who now goes by the name Nkechi Amare Diallo, known for identifying as a Black woman despite having been born to White parents, successfully passed as Black, to the extent that she took over leadership of the Spokane branch of the NAACP in 2014, a year before she was "outed" in 2015
- Martina Big, a German television personality of white ancestry who identifies as Black, undergoing a perma-tanning procedure to give herself a dark skin color, eyebrow color and eye color.
- Jessica Krug, a Jewish-American woman who identified as various Black and Afro-Latina ethnicities over time, including "North African Blackness", "US-rooted Blackness", and "Caribbean-rooted Bronx Blackness"
- Oli London, British influencer and singer who previously identified as Korean, and had numerous plastic surgeries to alter his racial identity, modelled his appearance on his idol, BTS singer Jimin. By late 2022, he publicly apologized for claiming to be Korean, blaming it on American culture promoting the "transgender ideology" and has since advocated against "woke culture"
- Korla Pandit, African-American musician who posed as an Indian from New Delhi in both his public and private life, was born John Roland Redd
- Johnny Otis, A musician who was born to Greek parents but identified as black and spent much of his life advocating for civil rights for the African American community. He stated, "Those were my friends. That’s what I loved. It wasn’t the music that brought me to the black community. It was the way of life. I felt I was black"
- Sacheen Littlefeather, an activist for Native American issues who identified as part Apache, Yaqui, and European. After her death, her sisters were interviewed and claimed that they had no Native American ancestry. Born Marie Louise Cruz
- Mezz Mezzrow, A musician who declared he was a "voluntary Negro". He claims to have "definitely 'crossed the line' that divided white and black identities"

== Ethical considerations ==
Plastic surgeons Chuma J. Chike-Obi, Kofi Boahene and Anthony E. Brissett distinguish between motivations of aesthetics and racial transformation for patients of African descent seeking plastic surgery. In their opinion, "Patients whose desired surgical outcomes result in racial transformation should be educated about the potential risks of this objective, and these requests should generally be discouraged."

Feminist scholars have split views on the subject. Christine Overall, professor of philosophy at Queen's University at Kingston, has written that personal racial transformation, or as she puts it "transracialism", belongs to a larger class of personal surgical interventions. This larger class includes gender transition, body art, cosmetic surgery, Munchhausen syndrome, and labiaplasty. Her basic thesis is that the arguments against the ethical nature of racial transformation (e.g. "it's not possible", "betrayal of group identity", "reinforces oppression", etc.) stand or fall with the ethical arguments related to transsexual change. Cressida Heyes, professor of Philosophy of Gender and Sexuality at the University of Alberta, disagrees with Overall's schema. Heyes feels that racial transformation is fundamentally different from gender transition since race is also determined by ancestry, personal cultural history and societal definitions. Hence ethical considerations of transracial surgery are different from ethical considerations in gender-affirming surgery.

In 2026, a research paper by Erich Kasten was done on people who identify as transracial and published in volume 10 issue 4 of Acta Scientific MEDICAL SCIENCES. The study noted that "The feeling of belonging to the wrong ethnic group began on average at around age 11. The desired target race rarely encompassed actual races, but mostly ethnic groups (e.g., Sinti and Roma, Native American Indians, Arabs) or even countries (e.g., Colombia, Greece, Japan), and sometimes religious groups (e.g., Judaism). Asian, European/Caucasian, and Black were the most frequently mentioned targets; these were supplemented by aracial, panracial, and fictional races. The most common reasons were fascination with the culture, a feeling of deep connection, improved body image through identification, and an existing social network within the target group. Most respondents stated they would be happier if they could belong to the target race. Some even expected a therapeutic effect. In their personality profiles, in average the participants tended rather to be introverted and emotionally unstable, but exhibited greater creativity and openness to new experiences." Overall, the study concluded that "There are indeed people who suffer from having been born into the wrong race or ethnic group. A transition to the target group may potentially lead to greater life satisfaction. A comparison with other identity disorders reveals many parallels."

== See also ==
- Blackface – Theatrical makeup caricaturing Black people
- Black Like Me – 1961 nonfiction book by John Howard Griffin
- Brownface – Racial impersonation
- Cultural appropriation – Adoption of culture and cultural identity perceived as inappropriate
- Ethnic plastic surgery – Plastic surgery to change ethnic appearance
- Passing (racial identity) – When a person classified as one race is accepted as another
- Redface – Use of costumes to caricature Indigenous Americans
- Wigger – White person who emulates Black culture
