= Lori Gruen =

American philosopher

- Education: University of Colorado (BA, PhD)
- Occupation(s): William Griffin Professor of Philosophy, Wesleyan University
- Known for: Feminist philosophy, animal ethics, political philosophy
- Awards: Wesleyan Prize for Excellence in Research
- Notable ideas: Entangled empathy
- Website: www.lorigruen.com

Lori Gruen is an American philosopher, ethicist, and author who is the William Griffin Professor of Philosophy at Wesleyan University in Middletown, Connecticut. Gruen is also Professor of Science in Society, and Professor of Feminist, Gender and Sexuality Studies at Wesleyan.

A scholar specializing in animal ethics, Gruen is the author of several books, including Ethics and Animals: An Introduction (2011) and Entangled Empathy: An Alternative Ethic for Our Relationships with Animals (2015). She is the creator of first100chimps.wesleyan.edu, a memorial for the first 100 chimpanzees used in research in the United States.

Gruen has written for Time magazine, Al Jazeera, and the Washington Post.

== Career ==
After obtaining a BA in philosophy from the University of Colorado Boulder in 1983, Gruen spent a year as a graduate student at the University of Arizona, then worked for the animal liberation movement. In 1987 she published her first book, Animal Liberation: A Graphic Guide, written with Peter Singer and illustrated by David Hine, then returned to the University of Colorado Boulder in 1989, where she completed her PhD in 1994.

Her teaching posts have included the University of British Columbia (1991–1992); Lafayette College (1994–1997); the University of North Carolina at Chapel Hill (1997); and Stanford University (1994–1999). After joining Wesleyan University in 2000 as an assistant professor, she became chair of the philosophy department in 2010, professor in the feminist, gender and sexuality studies program in 2011, and the William Griffin Professor of Philosophy in 2015. She also co-coordinates a summer fellowship program in animal studies at Wesleyan.

=== Hypatia ===
Gruen served as the co-editor of Hypatia, the feminist philosophy journal, from 2008 to 2010, and as a member of its board of associate editors from 2010 to 2015. She edited two special editions of the journal: 25th Anniversary: Feminist Legacies/Feminist Futures (2010) and, with Kari Weil, Animal Others (2012). The journal published a symposium in 2017 on Gruen's idea of "entangled empathy".

In April 2017, Hypatia published a peer-reviewed article by Rhodes College philosophy professor Rebecca Tuvel that compared transgender and transracial identities. New York magazine reported that Gruen was a lead signatory of an open letter calling for the retraction of the article by her former dissertation advisee. Hypatia's editor-in-chief stood by the publication of the article.

== Selected works ==
- (1987) with Peter Singer and David Hine. Animal Liberation: A Graphic Guide. London: Camden Press.
- (1994) with Dale Jamieson (eds.). Reflecting on Nature: Readings in Environmental Philosophy. New York: Oxford University Press. 1994. ISBN 978-0-19-508290-6.
- (1997) with George E. Panichas (eds.). Sex, Morality and the Law. New York: Routledge. 1997.
- (2007) with Laura Grabel and Peter Singer (eds.). Stem Cell Research: The Ethical Issues. Oxford: Blackwell.
- (2011) Ethics and Animals. Cambridge: Cambridge University Press.
- (2012) with Dale Jemieson and Christopher Schlottmann (eds.). Reflecting on Nature: Readings in Environmental Ethics and Philosophy, Second Edition. New York: Oxford University Press.
- (2014) (ed.) The Ethics of Captivity. New York: Oxford University Press.
- (2014) with Carol J. Adams (eds.). Ecofeminism: Feminist Intersections with Other Animals and the Earth. New York: Bloomsbury Press.
- (2015) Entangled Empathy: An Alternative Ethic for our Relationships with Animals. New York: Lantern.
- (2018) with Fiona Probyn-Rapsey (eds.). Animaladies: Gender, Animals, and Madness. New York: Bloomsbury Press.
- (2018) (ed.) Critical Terms for Animal Studies. Chicago: University of Chicago Press.
