= Youqine Lefèvre =

Belgian photographer and photojournalist

- Born: 1993 (age 32–33); China
- Education: Ecole de Recherche Graphique de Bruxelles (ERG), École Supérieure d'Arts Appliqués du Centre d'enseignement professionnel de Vevey
- Occupation: Photojournalist

Youqine Lefèvre (born 1993), is a Belgian photographer and photojournalist.

== Biography ==
Youqine Lefèvre was born in China. She grew up in Belgium. She graduated with a Master's bachelor's degree in plastic arts and visual arts from the Ecole de Recherche Graphique de Bruxelles (ERG). She continued her studies in photography at the École Supérieure d'Arts Appliqués du Centre d'enseignement professionnel de Vevey (CEPV).

She currently lives and works in Vevey, Switzerland.

== Artistic career ==
Youquine Lefèvre uses photography to address the themes of intimacy, childhood, memory, family and individual flaws. Her artistic practice oscillates between documentary and autobiographical creation.

=== Far from home (2016) ===
In the series, Far from home, she spent three years following the daily life of young children placed in a foster home, isolated in the mountains. Beyond simply telling the facts in images, the photographer integrates bridges with her own story.

In 2016, the series was selected for the Voies Off festival in Arles. She was also a finalist in the competition for young photographic talent, vfg Nachwuchsförderpreis für fotografie, organized in Switzerland. In the same year, she was laureate of the Photoforum Pasquart Prize, AUSWAHL4 selection. In 2017, Youquine Lefève is awarded the Bourse du Talent No. 70 Portrait and the Focal Prize of the city of Nyon.

=== The Land of Promises (2017) ===
In the series The Land of Promises, Youquine Lefèvre discusses her international and transracial adoption. Born in China, she is interested in the country's birth control policy and the One-child policy. For this project, she won first prize in the Pitch your photo competition at De Donkere Kamer in Belgium. In 2020, the photographer is laureate of the Horlait-Dapsens Prize. The series was selected for reGeneration4 at the Musée de l'Elysée in Lausanne, as well as for the Kassel Dummy Award, and the .tiff 2020 magazine prize dedicated to young Belgian photographic talent.

== Awards ==
- 2016 : Photoforum Pasquart Prize, AUSWAHL selection
- 2017: Talent Grant No. 70, Picto Foundation
- 2017 : Focal Prize of the city of Nyon
- 2020 : Horlait-Dapsens Award

== Exhibitions ==
- Far from Home, Focal Prize of the city of Nyon, FOCALE galerie, from 19 November 2017 to 24 December 2017
- Far from Home, Focus Bourse du Talent, Bibliothèque nationale de France, from 15 December 2017 to 4 March 2018
