= Alexis Shotwell =

Canadian philosopher

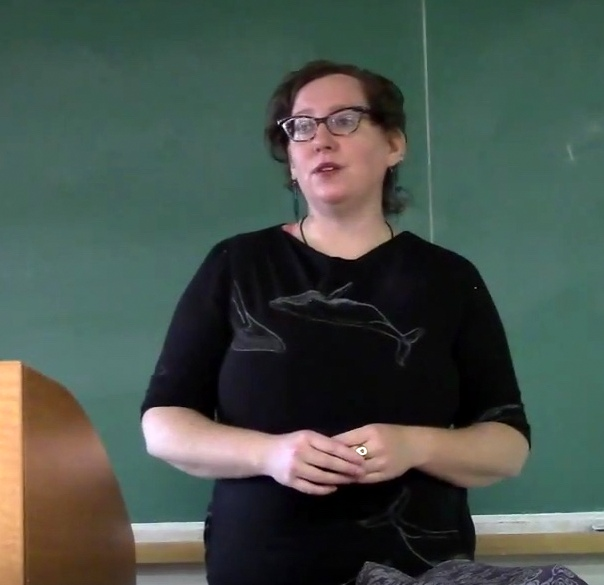
Alexis Shotwell in 2014

Alexis Shotwell (b. 1974) is a Canadian philosopher, currently employed as a Professor in the Department of Sociology and Anthropology at Carleton University in Ottawa, where she is cross-appointed with the Pauline Jewett Institute of Women's and Gender Studies and the Department of Philosophy. She was educated at University of California, Santa Cruz (PhD), Dalhousie University (MA) and McGill University (BA), Shotwell has also taught at Laurentian University.

She works in social philosophy, political theory, and feminist philosophy, especially on questions of moral complicity. She is also the lead researcher for a project on the history of AIDS activism in Canada.

== Publications ==
Her publications include:

- Against Purity: Living Ethically in Compromised Times, published by University of Minnesota Press (2016)
- Knowing Otherwise: Race, Gender, and Implicit Understanding, published by Pennsylvania State University Press (2011)

== See also ==
- Hypatia transracialism controversy
