= Scientific dissent =

Dissent from scientific consensus

Scientific dissent is dissent from scientific consensus. Disagreements can be useful for finding problems in underlying assumptions, methodologies, and reasoning, as well as for generating and testing new ways of tackling the unknown. In modern times, with the increased role of science on the society and the politicization of science, a new aspect gained prominence: effects of scientific dissent on public policies.

Scientific dissent is distinct from denialism, which is a deliberate rejection of scientific consensus usually for commercial or ideological reasons.

== Dissent as part of scientific inquiry ==
Miriam Solomon in her book Social Empiricism argues that scientific dissent is the normal state of scientific inquiry, rather than a conflict that needs resolution. She argues that disagreements between individual scientists about the proper direction of research are not cause for concern, because scientific rationality must be assessed at the level of the scientific community. As long as all theories being pursued yield some unique empirical successes, Solomon argues that their pursuit is worthwhile and consistent with the common view that science aims at truth. In Solomon's view, competing scientific theories can even be inconsistent with one another while each containing some degree of truth. Empirical evidence may not be sufficient to distinguish between competing theories, and successful theories often have core assumptions that are incorrect.

=== Historical scientific dissent ===
A number of famous scientists have been sceptical of what were, or came to be, mainstream scientific positions. For example, Ernst Mach famously declared in 1897: "I don't believe that atoms exist!" Wilhelm Ostwald expressed a similar scepticism about atoms, but changed his mind in 1908.

In the early 20th century, peptic ulcers were believed to be caused by stress and dietary factors. The physicians Robin Warren and Barry Marshall showed in 1982 that the bacterium Helicobacter pylori was responsible, but the medical community was slow to make appropriate changes in ulcer treatment.

== Suppressed dissent ==
Scientific debate is a healthy and necessary part of science, but scientific debate may collide with power dynamics within the academic world. Suppression of legitimate scientific debate can be considered as a breach of academic integrity. Examples of suppression include journal editors rejecting a paper for political reasons prior to peer-review, refusing access to data for research which might draw negative conclusions about the safety of some commercial product, and putting pressure on a university to fire a dissenting researcher.

== False scientific dissent ==
In modern times proponents of science denialism, pseudoscience, and conspiracy theories often try to disguise their viewpoints as "scientific dissent" to take an advantage of the benefit of doubt. Such cases are typically recognized by lack of crucial elements of scientific approach: insufficient evidence base, lack of rigor and control, etc.

Lack of discussion of claims coming from fringe science may be presented as suppression by mainstream science. This was described as "manufacturing dissent" and discussed in the context of neo-creationism.

In the introduction to Creating Scientific Controversies, David Harker summarizes the history of how the tobacco industry worked towards manufacturing a controversy regarding the health effects of tobacco.

In what is sometimes known as the "Galileo gambit", pseudoscientists will sometimes compare themselves to Galileo, arguing that opposition from established scientists is actually a point in favour of their ideas. Jean Paul Van Bendegem writes that "No doubt the most famous example of mistaken analogy is the abuse of Galileo Galilei's case resulting in his conviction by the Holy Inquisition. The basic strategy consists of equating Galileo with the poor astrologer or parapsychologist and equating the Inquisition with the scientific establishment."

== Effect on modern public policies ==
Views which disagree with scientific consensus may have an adverse effect on the perception of science by general public and affect decision making in various policies. When prominently promoted without due proportion, dissenting views can create an impression of uncertainty to laypeople. Common examples of such situation include global warming controversy and issues of public health and genetically modified organisms. Therefore, scientists treat scientific dissent as problematic when it may have a significant impact on public and policy-making, and try to mitigate it.

Inmaculada de Melo-Martín and Kristen Intemann criticize three major strategies in battling allegedly dangerous scientific dissent: masking the dissent, silencing the dissent, and discrediting the dissenters. Melo-Martin and Intermann argue that these strategies come from a misdiagnosis: the real problem is not dissent, but public scientific illiteracy. Rather than focusing on dissent, scientists must concentrate on educating the general public, so that people could make educated opinions and recognize false claims and invalid arguments. They further argue that silencing dissent rather than promoting literacy incurs the risk of undermining the public trust in science.

Sheila Jasanoff, in the context of climate change, mentions a common argument that public opinion is poorly informed because petroleum industry manufactures uncertainties and the media exaggerate the dissent, but argues that it is insufficient for the understanding of the problem. She writes that studies of scientific controversies show that credibility of science depend not only on strong scientific consensus, but also on the persuasive power of those who speak for science, especially in the situations of controversy.

== See also ==
- Critical thinking
- Criticism of science
- Denialism
- Metascience
- Scientific skepticism
- Suppression of dissent

== Further references ==
- Bechler, Z. (1974) "Newton's 1672 optical controversies: a study in the grammar of scientific dissent" In: Yehuda Elkana and Samuel Sambursky (eds), The Interaction Between Science and Philosophy. Humanities Press. ISBN 9780391002555.
- Delborne, J.A. (2008) "Transgenes and transgressions: Scientific dissent as heterogeneous practice". Social Studies of Science, 38 (4): 509–541. doi:10.1177/0306312708089716
- Intemann, K. and de Melo-Martín, I. (2014) "Are there limits to scientists’ obligations to seek and engage dissenters?". Synthese, 191 (12): 2751–2765. doi:10.1007/s11229-014-0414-5
- Martin, B. (2008) "Enabling scientific dissent". New Doctor, (88): 2–5.
- Martin, B. (2012) "Breaking the siege: guidelines for struggle in science". In: P. Banks, D. Lunney and C. Dickman (eds) Science Under Siege: Zoology Under Threat, pp. 164–170.
- Maguire, R. (2007) "Scientific dissent amid the United Kingdom government's nuclear weapons programme". History Workshop Journal, 63 (1): 113–135).
- Shulman, S (2008) Undermining Science: Suppression and Distortion in the Bush Administration University of California Press. ISBN 9780520256262.
