= Andrea Nye =

Philosopher

Andrea Nye (born 1939) is an American feminist philosopher and writer. Nye is a Professor Emerita at the University of Wisconsin–Whitewater for the Philosophy and Religious Studies Department and an active member of the Women's Studies Department. In 1992, Nye received the University of Wisconsin–Whitewater Award for Outstanding Research.

== Life and career ==
Andrea Nye was born on October 22, 1939, in Philadelphia to attorney Hamilton Connor and home-maker Florence Deans. Nye received a B. A. in philosophy from Radcliffe College (Radcliffe Institute for Advanced Study) in 1961 and a Ph.D. in philosophy from the University of Oregon in 1977. Nye has been affiliated with the University of Wisconsin—Whitewater for decades; first as an assistant professor from 1978 to 1985, then as an associate professor from 1985 to 1990, followed by a position as a professor of philosophy from 1990 to 2002. Nye has been a professor emeritus for the philosophy and religious studies department since 2002. Andrea Nye is also a member of the Liberal Studies Division at the Boston Conservatory teaching interdisciplinary courses in the Humanities.

Nye's early work in philosophy of language included a thesis on private language and a monograph on the history of logic from a feminist perspective. In subsequent work, Nye turned more specifically to issues related to gender in language, the place of women in the history of philosophy, and feminist theory. Reviving the work of neglected or misinterpreted women thinkers was of special interest in later work, including translations and commentary on the letters of Elisabeth of the Palatinate to René Descartes (The Princess and the Philosopher), the political thought of Rosa Luxemburg, Hannah Arendt, and Simone Weil (Philosophia), and Diotima's teaching on erotic desire in Plato's Symposium (Socrates and Diotima).

Most recently, Nye's interests have turned to the environment, climate change, and the gap between ecological theorizing and environmental practice. In her most recent book Ecology on the ground and in the Clouds, she compares the life and thought of "inventor of nature" Alexander Humboldt to projects of conservation and sustainable farming in Argentina and Brazil initiated by his botanist travel companion Aimé Bonpland.

== Publications ==
- Andrea Nye (1986). Preparing the Way for a Feminist Praxis Hypatia Vol. 1, No. 1, pp. 101-116
- — (1987). Woman Clothed with the Sun: Julia Kristeva and the Escape from/to Language Signs Vol. 12, No. 4, Within and Without: Women, Gender, and Theory, pp. 664-686 University of Chicago Press
- — (1987). Feminist Theory and the Philosophies of Man (2013 ed.). Taylor & Francis. ISBN 978-1-134-56702-7.
- — (1989). The Hidden Host: Irigaray and Diotima at Plato's Symposium. Hypatia Vol. 3, No. 3, French Feminist Philosophy, 45-61
- — (1990). Words of power: a feminist reading of the history of logic. Routledge. ISBN 978-0-415-90199-4. JSTOR 2275421.
- — (1994). "Feminist Interpretations of Plato". Irigaray and Diotima at Plato's Symposium. Penn State Press. pp. 197–216. ISBN 0-271-01044-4.
- — (1996). "Polity and Prudence:The Ethics of Elisabeth, Princess Palatine," in Hypatia's Daughters: Fifteen Hundred Years of Women Philosophers McAlister, Linda Lopez, ed. Bloomington: Indiana University Press
- — (1996).Friendship across Generation Hypatia Vol. 11, No. 3
- — (1994). Philosophia: The Thought of Rosa Luxemburg, Simone Weil, and Hannah Arendt (2013 ed.). Routledge. ISBN 978-1-135-88247-1.
- — (1995). Philosophy and feminism: at the border. Twayne Publishers. ISBN 978-0-8057-9778-7. JSTOR 3175105.
  - — (1995). Feminist Impact on the Arts and Sciences Series: Philosophy and Feminism, Cengage Gale. ISBN 9780805797787
- — (1999). The Princess and the Philosopher: Letters of Elisabeth of the Palatine to René Descartes. Rowman & Littlefield. ISBN 978-0-8476-9265-1.
- — (2004). Feminism and Modern Philosophy: An Introduction. Psychology Press. ISBN 978-0-415-26655-0.
- — (2015). Socrates and Diotima: Sexuality, Religion, and the Nature of Divinity. Palgrave Macmillan, ISBN 978-1137516015
- — (2022).Ecology on the Ground and in the Clouds. Albany, New York: SUNY Press. 2022. ISBN 978-1-4384-8701-4.

Edited Works

- — (1998). Philosophy of Language: The Big Question's London and New York: Blackwell, ISBN 978-0-631206026
