= Camisha Russell =

Camisha Russell is professor and department head of philosophy at the University of Oregon in Eugene, Oregon. Russell specializes in Critical Philosophy of Race, Bioethics, and Feminist Theory.

== Early life and education ==
Russell decided to pursue graduate studies in philosophy after attending the Summer Institute in Philosophy for Minority Students at Rutgers University in 2000. Before beginning graduate school, Russell spent two years working as a Peace Corps volunteer in Togo, West Africa in the Girls’ Education and Empowerment program.

Russell received her Masters in Philosophy in 2008 from the University of Memphis and PhD in Philosophy in 2013 from Penn State University.

== Career ==
Camisha Russell is professor and chair of Philosophy at the University of Oregon. Russell was a Mellon Foundation New Directions Fellow for 2024. From January 2019 to December 2023, Russell served as a co-editor of Hypatia: A Journal of Feminist Philosophy.

Russell has stated that her "career has been guided by an overarching desire for social justice and a specific mission of increasing the diversity of the discipline of philosophy, both in terms of its members and its areas of concern." She refers to herself as "a committed philosophical pluralist and a meliorist, who believes genuinely, if naively, in working within institutions to bring about transformation."

== Bibliography ==
=== Books ===
- The Assisted Reproduction of Race (2018). Bloomington: Indiana University Press.
- Assisted Reproductive Justice: Race, Law, and the Fertility Industry (2026) with Kimberley Mutcherson. University of California Press.

=== Chapters ===
- “Are African Americans Really Americans?: African American Ambivalence and the Plural Subject Theory of Political Obligation.” Broadening the Contours in the Study of Black Politics (2017). Routledge, pp. 27–44.

=== Selected Essays ===
- "Is there a Right to Assisted Procreation? A Reproductive Justice Approach." Philosophy, Politics and Critique 2, no. 3, 2025, pp. 241–259, https://doi.org/10.3366/ppc.2025.0083.
- "Where to Start with an Ontology That Doesn’t Come First?" Feminist Philosophy Quarterly 11, no. 3, 2025, https://ojs.lib.uwo.ca/index.php/fpq/article/view/24030.
- “Meeting the Moment: Bioethics in the Time of Black Lives Matter.” American Journal of Bioethics, vol. 22, no. 3, 2022, pp. 9–21.
- “Which Lives Matter in Reproductive Biomedicine?” Reproductive Biomedicine & Society Online, vol. 14, 2022, pp. 28–31.
- “Positivism and Progress in Firmin’s Equality of the Human Races.” Journal of Pan African Studies, vol. 7, no. 2, 2014, pp. 45–67.
- “Thin Skin, Thick Blood: Identity, Stability and the Project of Black Solidarity.” Journal for Peace and Justice Studies, vol. 19, no. 1, 2009, pp. 66–81.

== See also ==
- Hypatia transracialism controversy
