= Ásta Kristjana Sveinsdóttir =

Icelandic philosopher (born 1969)

- Born: October 5, 1969 (age 56); Reykjavík, Iceland
- Education: Massachusetts Institute of Technology
- Occupation: Philosopher
- Website: https://scholars.duke.edu/person/Asta.Sveinsdottir

Ásta Kristjana Sveinsdóttir (born October 5, 1969), who publishes as Ásta, is an Icelandic philosopher. She was a professor of philosophy at San Francisco State University and is currently a professor at Duke University.

== Education ==
Born in Reykjavík, Ásta has a BA in mathematics and philosophy from Brandeis University in 1992, MA in philosophy from Harvard University in 1997, and a PhD in philosophy from the Massachusetts Institute of Technology in 2004.

She was a host lecturer at Vassar College in New York in late 2004 and early 2005, and has taught at San Francisco State University since the autumn of 2005. In 2022, she started teaching philosophy at Duke University.

== Career ==
Ásta is predominantly concerned with metaphysics, the philosophy of language, epistemology, ethics, and aesthetics. She has authored papers on feminist metaphysics such as The Metaphysics of Sex and Gender.

Ásta's first book appeared in 2018, Categories We Live By, published by Oxford University Press.

== See also ==
- Hypatia transracialism controversy
