= Tina Fernandes Botts =

American philosopher and academic

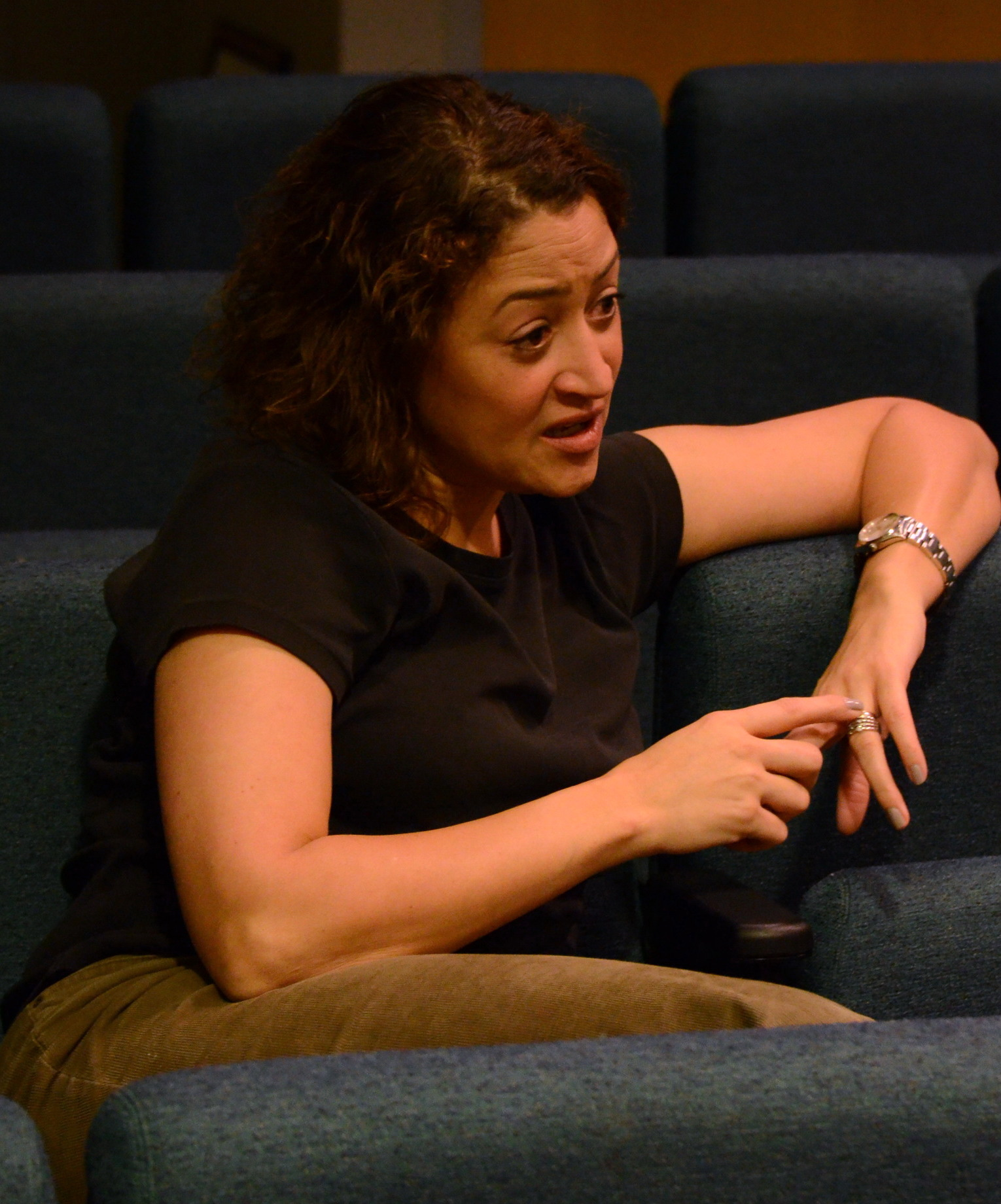

Philosophical work
- Era: Contemporary philosophy
- Region: Western philosophy
- School: Analytic; Continental
- Main interests: Philosophy of law Hermeneutics; Feminist philosophy Ethics Critical race theory Social philosophy History of philosophy

Tina Fernandes Botts is an American legal scholar and philosophy professor currently teaching at Washburn University School of Law.

She is known for her work in constitutional law, legal hermeneutics, intersectionality, feminist philosophy, and philosophy of race (particularly mixed-race theory). Previous posts include visiting scholar at Dartmouth College; visiting professor of law at University of the Pacific, McGeorge School of Law; assistant professor of philosophy at California State University, Fresno; visiting assistant professor of philosophy at Oberlin College; fellow in law and philosophy at the University of Michigan, Ann Arbor; and assistant professor of philosophy, and faculty associate and area leader in Public Policy and Diversity, at the University of North Carolina at Charlotte.

== Education and career ==
Botts earned her Ph.D. in philosophy from the University of Memphis under the supervision of Thomas Nenon, her J.D. from Rutgers School of Law, and her B.A. in philosophy with a minor in physics from the University of Maryland at College Park.

== Research areas ==
Botts' research areas are constitutional law, philosophy of law (including critical race theory), philosophical hermeneutics, philosophy of race, feminist philosophy, ethical theory, and applied ethics.

== Selected works ==
- For Equals Only: Race, Equality, and the Equal Protection Clause. Lexington. 2018. ISBN 9781498501231.
- "Legal Hermeneutics," Internet Encyclopedia of Philosophy, 2015. ISSN 2161-0002
- Botts, Tina Fernandes, ed. (2016). Philosophy and the Mixed Race Experience. Lexington Books. ISBN 9781498509428.
- "Antidiscrimination Law and the Multiracial Experience: A Reply to Nancy Leong" 10 Hastings Race and Poverty Law Journal 191, Summer 2013.
- "Hermeneutics, Race, and Gender" in The Routledge Companion to Philosophical Hermeneutics, Jeff Malpas and Hans-Helmuth Gander, eds., London: Taylor and Francis (2014).
- Feminist Thought. 5th Edition, co-authored with Rosemarie Tong, Boulder, CO: Westview Press, 2013. ISBN 978-0813349954
