= Eva Kittay =

American philosopher

Eva Feder Kittay
- Awards: Guggenheim Fellowship (2014), NEH Fellowship (2013), Phi Beta Kappa Lebowitz Prize (2013), Society for Women in Philosophy Women of the Year (2003-4)

Education
- Education: CUNY Graduate Center (PhD), Sarah Lawrence College (BA)
- Thesis: "The Cognitive Force of Metaphor"
- Doctoral advisor: Peter Caws

Philosophical work
- Era: Contemporary philosophy
- Region: Western philosophy
- School: Analytic philosophy, Feminist philosophy
- Institutions: Stony Brook University
- Notable students: Serene Khader, Bonnie J. Mann
- Main interests: Feminist philosophy, ethics of care, social and political theory, metaphor, disability studies
- Notable works: Love's Labor: Essays on Women, Equality and Dependency, Metaphor: Its Cognitive Force and Linguistic Structure
- Notable ideas: Accounting for dependency as a feature justice, cognitive disability and moral personhood, reciprocity, semantic field theory of metaphor
- Website: evafederkittay.com

Eva Feder Kittay is an American philosopher. She is Distinguished Professor of Philosophy (Emerita) at Stony Brook University. Her primary interests include feminist philosophy, ethics, social and political theory, metaphor, and the application of these disciplines to disability studies. Kittay has also attempted to bring philosophical concerns into the public spotlight, including leading The Women's Committee of One Hundred in 1995, an organization that opposed the perceived punitive nature of the social welfare reforms taking place in the United States at the time.

== Education and career ==
Kittay received her bachelor's degree from Sarah Lawrence College in 1967, and went on to receive her doctoral degree from the Graduate Center of the City University of New York in 1978. After receiving her doctorate, she accepted a position as visiting assistant professor of philosophy at the University of Maryland, College Park for the 1978–1979 year, before accepting a permanent position at Stony Brook University in 1979 as assistant professor. Kittay was promoted to associate professor in 1986, and full professor in 1993. Kittay received a distinguished professorship from Stony Brook in 2009. Kittay is also a senior fellow at the Center for Medical Humanities, Compassionate Care, and Bioethics at Stony Brook, and a women's studies associate.

She has received numerous awards, including a Guggenheim Fellowship, and NEH Fellowship, and the Lebowitz Prize for philosophical achievement and contribution from the American Philosophical Association and Phi Beta Kappa. In 2024, she was elected a Fellow of the American Academy of Arts and Sciences.

She is the mother of a multiple disabled woman and has also been recognized for her writing on disability by the Institute Mensch, Ethiks, und Wissenshaft, The Center for Discovery and IncludeNYC. She was named Woman of the Year by the Society for Women in Philosophy 2003–2004. She served as the president of the American Philosophical Association, Eastern Division, 2016–2017.

== Research areas ==
Kittay's research has focused on feminist philosophy, ethics, social and political theory, the philosophy of disability, metaphor, and the application of these disciplines to disability studies. Her viewpoints on the ethics of care are quite similar to those of Virginia Held and Sara Ruddick – namely that human interactions occur between people who are unequal yet interdependent, and that practical ethics should be fitted to life as most people experience it. Kittay has also extended the work of John Rawls to address the concerns of women and the cognitively disabled. In developing the ethics of care, her most significant contribution has been the emphasis on the inevitable fact of human dependency and the need to incorporate such dependency and dependency work into ethical and political theories. She has been one of the major voices in the emergent field of philosophy of disability, focusing in particular on cognitive disability.

== Selected bibliography ==
=== Books ===
- Kittay, Eva (2020). Learning from My Daughter. The Value and Care of Disabled Minds. Oxford New York: Oxford University Press. ISBN 9780190844608.
- Kittay, Eva (1999). Love's labor: essays on women, equality, and dependency. Thinking gender. New York: Routledge. ISBN 9780415904131.
- Kittay, Eva (1987). Metaphor: its cognitive force and linguistic structure. Oxford New York: Clarendon Press Oxford University Press. ISBN 9780198249351.

=== Edited books ===
- Kittay, Eva; Licia Carlson (2010). Cognitive disability and its challenge to moral philosophy. New York, Oxford: Wiley-Blackwell Publishing. ISBN 9781444322798.
- Kittay, Eva; Alcoff, Linda (2007). The Blackwell guide to feminist philosophy. Malden, Massachusetts Oxford: Blackwell Publishing. ISBN 9780631224273.
- Kittay, Eva; Feder, Ellen K. (2002). The subject of care: feminist perspectives on dependency. Lanham, Maryland: Rowman & Littlefield Publishers. ISBN 9780742513631.
- Kittay, Eva; Lehrer, Adrienne (1992). Frames, fields, and contrasts: new essays in semantic and lexical organization. Hillsdale, New Jersey: L. Erlbaum Associates. ISBN 9780805810899.
- Kittay, Eva; Meyers, Diana T. (1987). Women and moral theory. Totowa, New Jersey: Rowman & Littlefield. ISBN 9780847673827.

=== Selected chapters in books ===
- Feder Kittay, Eva (2005), "Vulnerability and the moral nature of dependency relations", in Cudd, Ann E.; Andreasen, Robin O. (eds.), Feminist theory: a philosophical anthology, Oxford, UK Malden, Massachusetts: Blackwell Publishing, pp. 264–279, ISBN 9781405116619.
- Feder Kittay, Eva (2009), "Ideal theory bioethics and the exclusion of people with severe cognitive disabilities", in Lindemann, Hilde; Verkerk, Marian; Walker, Margaret Urban (eds.), Naturalized bioethics: toward responsible knowing and practice, Cambridge New York: Cambridge University Press, pp. 218–237, ISBN 9780521719407.
