= Lisa Guenther =

Canadian philosopher and activist

Lisa Guenther (/ˈɡʌnθər/; born 1971) is a Canadian philosopher and activist, known for her work on solitary confinement, prison torture, reproductive injustice, and the carceral state.

== Education and career ==
Guenther received a Bachelor of Arts from Bishop's University and a Doctor of Philosophy from the University of Toronto.

Cross-appointed to the Department of Philosophy and the Graduate Program in Cultural Studies, Guenther is a Queen’s National Scholar in Political Philosophy and Critical Prison Studies at Queen's University in Kingston, Ontario, Canada. Prior to 2018, she served as Associate Professor of Philosophy at Vanderbilt University. Her first academic position was at the University of Auckland.

== Research areas ==
Guenther specializes in feminist philosophy, critical phenomenology, and political philosophy. Her 2015 book, Solitary Confinement, has been described by the Notre Dame Philosophical Reviews as "a liberation manifesto in struggles against captivity".

== Public philosophy ==
Guenther's work with inmates on death row in Riverbend maximum security prison in Nashville has received considerable media attention. In her interview with The Boston Review she describes her efforts as being grounded in a new understanding of what philosophy is: "I now approach philosophy as a radical democratic practice of collective sense-making." The Chronicle of Higher Education in its profile of Guenther called her "radical advocate for prison reform."

== Publications ==
=== As author ===
- Guenther, Lisa (2013). Solitary Confinement: Social Death and its Afterlives. University of Minnesota Press. ISBN 978-0-816-67959-1.
- Guenther, Lisa (2006). The Gift of the Other: Levinas and the Politics of Reproduction. SUNY Press. ISBN 978-0-791-46848-7.

=== As editor ===
- Adelsberg, Geoff; Guenther, Lisa; Zeman, Scott, eds. (2015). Death and Other Penalties: Philosophy in a Time of Mass Incarceration. New York: Fordham University Press. ISBN 978-0-823-26530-5.

== See also ==
- Hypatia transracialism controversy
