= Diana Tietjens Meyers =

American philosopher

Diana Meyers is a philosopher working in the philosophy of action and in the philosophy of feminism. Meyers is professor emerita of philosophy at the University of Connecticut.

== Biography ==
Diana Meyers holds a bachelor's degree from the University of Chicago and a master's degree and PhD from The Graduate Center, CUNY. She mostly works "in three main areas of philosophy: philosophy of action, feminist ethics, and human rights theory".

== Awards ==
In December 2012, Meyers was awarded the Distinguished Woman Philosopher award at the 2012 APA Eastern Conference.

== Publications ==
=== Books ===
- Meyers, Diana T. (1985). Inalienable rights: a defense. Columbia University Press. Spanish translation, Alianza Editorial, Madrid, 1988; Chapter 5 reprinted in The Philosophy of Human Rights, ed. Morton E. Winston, Wadsworth, 1989.
- Meyers, Diana T.; Kittay, Eva (1987). Women and moral theory. Totowa, New Jersey: Rowman & Littlefield. ISBN 9780847673827.
- Meyers, Diana T. (1989). Self, society, and personal choice. Columbia University Press. ISBN 9780231064187. Part IV, Chapter 2 reprinted in Dignity, Character, and Self-Respect, ed. Robin S. Dillon, Routledge, 1994; Part II, Chapters 2-3, revised and translated into German to be reprinted in Autonomie, ed. Monika Betzler, Mentis. Preview.
- Meyers, Diana T. (1994). Subjection and subjectivity: psychoanalytic feminism, and moral philosophy. Thinking Gender Series. Routledge.
- Meyers, Diana T. (2002). Gender in the mirror: cultural imagery and women's agency. Oxford University Press. Oxford Scholarship On-Line, 2003; excerpt of Chapter 7 in the APA Newsletter on Feminism and Philosophy, Fall 2002; a Choice Outstanding Academic Title for 2004.
- Meyers, Diana T. (March 2004). Being yourself: essays on identity, action, and social life. Rowman and Littlefield. (A Selection of New and Previously Published Essays with an Introduction by the Author).

=== Articles ===
- "Human Rights in Pre-Affluent Societies", The Philosophical Quarterly, 31(1981), pp. 139–144.
- "The Inevitability of the State", Analysis, 41 (1981), pp. 46–49.
- "The Rationale for Inalienable Rights in Moral Systems", Social Theory and Practice, 7 (1981), pp. 127–143.
- "Rights-based Rights", Law and Philosophy, 3 (1984), pp. 407–418.
- "A Sketch of a Rights Taxonomy", in Economic Justice: Private Rights and Public Responsibilities, edited by Kenneth Kipnis and Diana T. Meyers (1985), pp. 87–94.
- "The Politics of Self-respect: A Feminist Perspective", Hypatia, 1 (1986): 83–100.
- "Work and Self-respect", in Moral Rights in the Workplace, edited by Gertrude Ezorsky, State University of New York Press, 1986, pp. 18–27; reprinted in Ethical Theory and Business, edited by Norman Bowie and Tom L. Beauchamp, Prentice-Hall, 1988, in Making a Living, edited by Janet Marting, Harper Collins, 1993, in Findings, edited by Lewis A. Meyers, D.C. Heath, 1995.
- "Kant's Liberal Alliance: A Permanent Peace?" in Political Realism and International Morality: Ethics in the Nuclear Age, edited by Kenneth Kipnis and Diana T. Meyers, Westview Press, 1987, pp. 212–219.
- "The Socialized Individual and Individual Autonomy: An Intersection between Philosophy and Psychology", in Women and Moral Theory, edited by Eva Kittay and Diana T. Meyers, 1987, pp. 139–153.
- "Personal Autonomy and the Paradox of Feminine Socialization", The Journal of Philosophy, Vol. 84 (1987), pp. 619–628, reprinted in Ethics in the 90s, ed. Joram Graf Haber, Bartlett, 1997.
- "Democratic Theory and the Democratic Agent", NOMOS XXXII, ed. John W. Chapman and Alan Wertheimer. New York: NYU Press, 1990, pp. 126–150.
- "Personal Autonomy or the Deconstructed Subject?" Hypatia, Vol.7 (1992), pp. 124–132.
- "The Subversion of Women's Agency in Psychoanalytic Feminism: Chodorow, Flax, Kristeva" in Bartky, Sandra Lee; Fraser, Nancy (1992). Revaluing French feminism: critical essays on difference, agency, and culture. Bloomington: Indiana University Press. pp. 136–161. ISBN 9780253206824.
- "Social Exclusion, Moral Reflection, and Rights", Law and Philosophy, Vol. 12 (1993), pp. 115–130; reprinted in Radical Critiques of the Law, edited by Stephen Griffin and Robert Moffat, U. Kansas Press, 1997.
- "Moral Reflection: Beyond Impartial Reason", Hypatia, Vol. 8 (1993), pp. 21–47.
- "Cultural Diversity: Rights, Goals, and Competing Values", in Jewish Identity, edited by Michael Krausz and David Goldberg, Temple University Press, 1993, pp. 15–34; reprinted in Rights and Reason: Essays in Honor of Carl Wellman, edited by Marilyn Friedman, Larry May, Kate Parsons, and Jennifer Stiff, Kluwer, 2000.
- "Rights in Collision: A Non-Punitive, Compensatory Remedy for Abusive Speech", Law and Philosophy, 14 (2),1995: 203-243; reprinted in Liberty, Equality, Plurality, edited by Larry May and Christine Sistare, University Press of Kansas, 1997; nominated for the Berger Prize for the best published paper in legal theory, 1996.
- "Emotion and Heterodox Moral Perception: An Essay in Moral Social Psychology", in Feminists Rethink the Self, edited by Diana T. Meyers, Westview Press, 1997.
- "Moral Subjectivity" in the Blackwell Dictionary of Business Ethics, edited by R. Edward Freeman and Patricia Werhane, 1997.
- "The Family Romance: A Fin-de-Siecle Tragedy", in Feminism and Families, edited by Hilde Nelson, Routledge, 1997; reprinted in Feminist Social Thought: A Reader, edited by Diana T. Meyers, Routledge, 1997.
- "Agency", in A Companion to Feminist Philosophy, edited by Alison Jaggar and Iris Young, Blackwell, 1998.
- "Tropes of Social Relations and the Problem of Tropisms in Figurative Discourse", in Norms and Values: Essays in Honor of Virginia Held, edited by Mark Halfon and Joram Haber, Rowman and Littlefield, 1998.
- "Authenticity for Real People", in Proceedings of the Twentieth World Congress of Philosophy: Philosophy of Mind and Philosophy of Psychology (2001):195-202.
- "Miroir, Memoire, Mirage: Appearance, Aging, and Women", in Mother Time: Ethical Issues in Women and Aging. edited by Margaret Urban Walker, Rowman and Littlefield, 1999.
- "Feminist Perspectives on the Self", in the Stanford Encyclopedia of Philosophy, (Fall 1999 Edition), ed. Edward N. Zalta, URL: http://plato.stanford.edu/archives/fall1999/feminism-self. 1999.
- "Intersectional Identity and the Authentic Self? Opposites Attract", in Relational Autonomy, edited by Catriona Mackenzie and Natalie Stoljar, Oxford University Press, 2000.
- "The Rush to Motherhood — Pronatalist Discourse and Women's Autonomy", Signs 26 (2001): 735-773; received Honorable Mention as a 2003 Outstanding Article, American Sociological Association, Sex and Gender Section.
- "Marginalized Identities — Individuality, Groups, and Theory" in Marginal Groups and Mainstream American Culture, ed. Yolanda Estes, Arnold Lorenzo Farr, Patricia Smith, and Clelia Smyth, Kansas University Press, 2000.
- "Feminism and Women's Autonomy: The Challenge of Female Genital Cutting", Metaphilosophy 31 (2000): 469-491; also in The Edinburgh Companion to Contemporary Liberalism, ed. Mark Evans, Edinburgh University Press, 2001.
- "Nancy J. Chodorow" in Key Contemporary Social Theorists, Ed. Anthony Elliott and Larry Ray. Oxford: Blackwell, 2002.
- "Social Groups and Individual Identities", in Feminists Doing Ethics, ed. Peggy DesAutels and Joanne Waugh, Rowman and Littlefield, 2001.
- "Gendered Work and Autonomy", in Recognition, Responsibility, and Rights: Feminist Ethics and Social Theory. Ed. Hilde Nelson and Robin Fiore. Rowman and Littlefield, 2003.
- "Frontiers of Individuality: Embodiment and Relationships in Cultural Context", History and Theory 42 (May 2003): 267-281.
- "Narrative and Moral Life", in Setting the Moral Compass: Essays by Women Philosophers. ed. Cheshire Calhoun. Oxford University Press, 2004; short version published in Center for Research on Women Working Papers, Rutgers University, 2003 and translated into Croatian in Zarez, June 2003.
- "Feminine Mortality Imagery: Feminist Ripostes", in Being Yourself: Essays on Identity, Action, and Social Life, Rowman and Littlefield, March 2004.
- "The Three Freds and the Fate of Their Happiness", Journal of Social Philosophy 35 (Spring 2004): 8-10.
- "Decentralizing Autonomy — Five Faces of Selfhood", in Autonomy and the Challenges to Liberalism. Ed. Joel Anderson and John Christman. Cambridge University Press, 2005.
- "Introduction: Women Philosophers, Sidelined Challenges, and Professional Philosophy." Hypatia 30 (3) 2005: 149-152.
- "Who's There? Selfhood, Self-regard, and Social Relations." Hypatia (special issue on Feminist Philosophy in the Analytic Tradition, Ed. Samantha Brennan and Anita Superson), 20 (4) 2005: 200-215.
- "GEM Anscombe." Encyclopedia of Women in World History, Ed. Bonnie Smith, Oxford University Press, 2008.
- "Narrative Structures, Narratives of Abuse, and Human Rights" in Feminist Ethics and Social and Political Philosophy: Theorizing the Non- Ideal. Ed. Lisa Tessman, Kluwer, 2009.
- "Artifice and Authenticity: Gender Technology and Agency in Two Jenny Saville Portraits." In "You've Changed": Sex Reassignment and Personal Identity. Ed. Laurie Shrage. Oxford University Press. 2009.
- "Philosophical Feminism", Encyclopædia Britannica, 2009.
- "Two Victim Paradigms and the Problem of 'Impure' Victims." Humanity: An International Journal of Human Rights, Humanitarianism, and Development, Vol. 2, No. 2, Fall 2011: 255-275.
- "Jenny Saville Remakes the Female Nude – Feminist Reflections on the State of the Art" in Beauty Unlimited, Ed. Peg Brand, Indiana University Press, 2012.
- "Psychocorporeal Selfhood, Practical Intelligence, and Adaptive Autonomy", in Autonomy and the Self, ed. Michael Kühler and Nadja Jelinek, in the Philosophical Studies series, ed. Stephen Hetheringten, Springer 2012.
- "Feminism and Sex Trafficking: Rethinking Some Aspects of Autonomy and Paternalism", Ethical Theory and Moral Practice for a special issue "Private Autonomy, Public Paternalism?" Ed. Annette Dufner and Michael Kühler, 2013; DOI: 10.1007/s10677-013-9452-1.
- "Corporeal Selfhood, Self-Interpretation, and Narrative Selfhood." Philosophical Explorations. 12/5/2013: DOI: 10.1080/13869795.2013.856933.
- "Victims, Agency, and Human Rights." e-IR. 2013: http://www.e-ir.info/2013/12/09/victims-agency-and-human-rights/ (open access).
- "The Feminist Debate over Values in Autonomy Theory." In Autonomy, Oppression, and Gender. Ed. Mark Piper and Andrea Veltman. Forthcoming Oxford University Press, forthcoming summer 2014.
- "Rethinking Coercion for a World of Poverty and Exploitation." In Poverty, Agency and Human Rights. Ed. Diana Tietjens Meyers. Oxford University Press, forthcoming 2014.
- "The Feminist Debate over Values in Autonomy Theory." In Autonomy, Oppression, and Gender. Ed. Mark Piper and Andrea Veltman. Oxford University Press. forthcoming 2014.
- "Rethinking Coercion for a World of Poverty and Transnational Migration." In Poverty, Agency and Human Rights. Ed. Diana Tietjens Meyers. Oxford University Press.
- "Victims of Trafficking, Reproductive Rights, and Asylum." In Oxford Handbook of Reproductive Ethics. Ed. Leslie P. Francis. Oxford University Press.
