= Feminist philosophy of science =

Means of interpreting scientific evidence through a feminist lens

Feminist philosophy of science is a branch of feminist philosophy that seeks to understand how the acquirement of knowledge through scientific means has been influenced by notions of gender identity and gender roles in society. Feminist philosophers of science question how scientific research and scientific knowledge itself may be influenced and possibly compromised by the social and professional framework within which that research and knowledge is established and exists. The intersection of gender and science allows feminist philosophers to reexamine fundamental questions and truths in the field of science to reveal how gender biases may influence scientific outcomes. The feminist philosophy of science has been described as being located "at the intersections of the philosophy of science and feminist science scholarship" and has attracted considerable attention since the 1980s.

Feminist philosophers of science use feminist epistemology as a lens through which to analyze scientific methods, results, and analysis. This epistemology emphasizes "situated knowledge" that hinges on one's individual perspectives on a subject; feminist philosophers often highlight the under-representation of female scientists in academia and the resulting androcentric biases that exist in science. Feminist philosophers suggest that integrating feminine modes of thought and logic that are undervalued by current scientific theory will enable improvement and broadening of scientific perspectives. Advocates assert that inclusive epistemology via applying a feminist philosophy of science will allow for a field of science that is more accessible to public. Practitioners of feminist philosophy of science also seek to promote gender equality in scientific fields and greater recognition of the achievements of women in science.

Critics have argued that the political commitments of advocates of feminist philosophy of science is incompatible with modern-day scientific objectivity, emphasizing the success of the scientific method due to its lauded objectivity and "value-free" methods of knowledge-making.

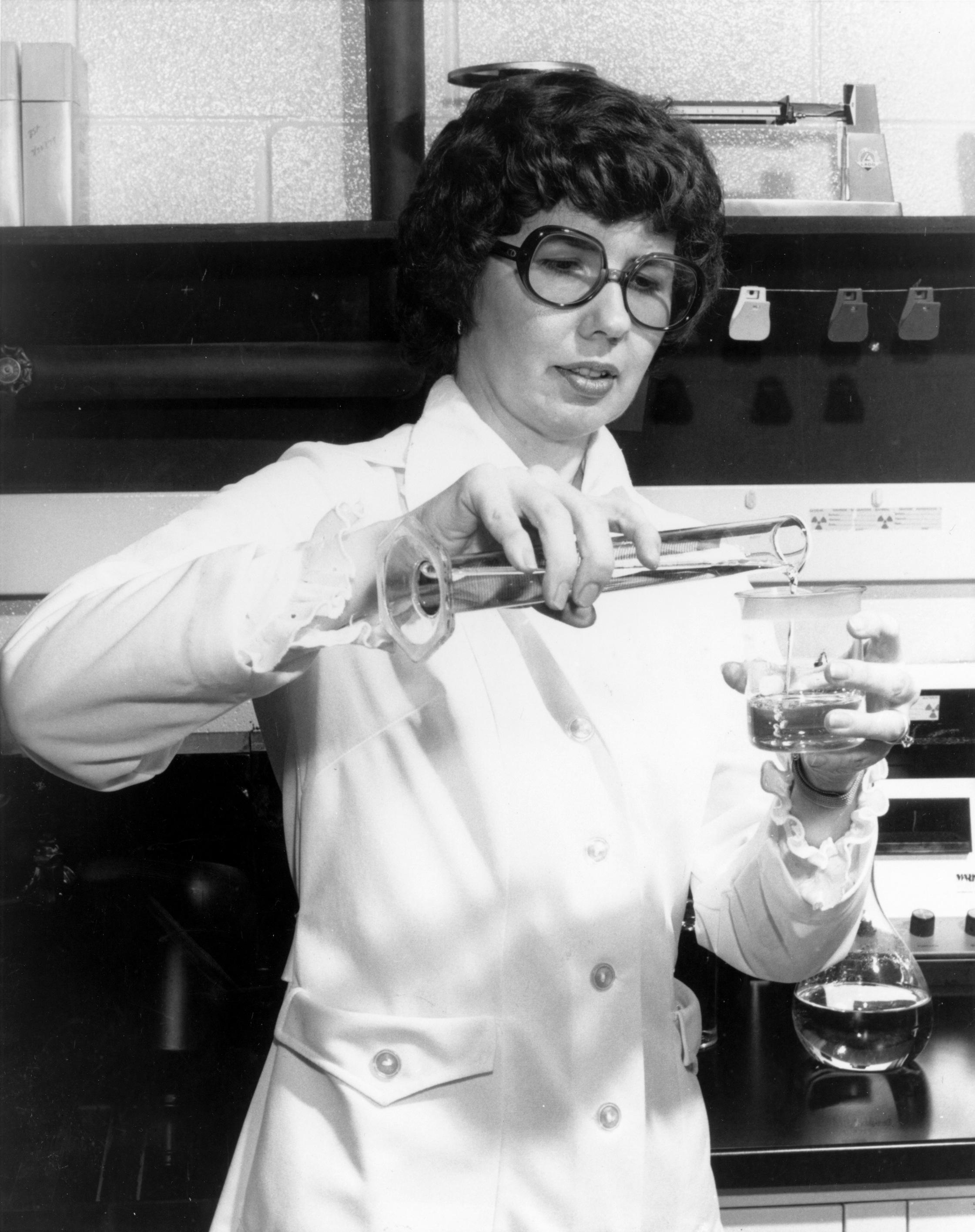
Women often weren't allowed to work officially as scientists, only as assistants for male scientists.

== History ==
The feminist philosophy of science was born out of feminist science studies in the 1960s, when female primatologists began to reevaluate stereotypes of male and female behavior in animals. However, feminist reform born from this branch of philosophy did not receive formal backing from the federal government until the late 1980s, after which its prominence as a philosophy of science grew. In 1986, the National Institutes of Health (NIH) instituted a requirement for both male and female subjects in medical and clinical research. In the early 1990s, the NIH Office of Research on Women's Health and $625 million in funding for the Women's Health Initiative represented drastic support for applications of the feminist philosophy of science in the public sphere.

These reforms coincided with the growth of the feminist philosophy of science in the academic realm. In August 1978, Catharine R. Stimpson and Joan Burstyn published an editorial in a special volume of Signs titled "Women, Science, and Society" highlighting the lack of female scholarship in science and its effects. Their article introduced three areas of scholarship: critiques of gender bias in science, a history of women in science, and social science data and public policy considerations on the status of women in the science.

In the 1980s, feminist science studies had become more philosophical, corresponding to a shift in many fields of academic feminism. Two main fields of thought emerged, creating a divide between scholarship on "women in science" and "feminist critiques of science". While both agreed on the existence of an androcentric bias in science, the former focused on an increase in funding and hiring of female scientists, while the latter called for an interrogation of the underlying assumptions and biases present in scientific theory and methods. The latter became the primary focus of feminist philosophers of science moving forward, and conflict arose between women who were actually involved in scientific research and those attempting a feminist critique of gender roles in science.

By the late nineties, feminist science studies had become well-established and had many prominent scholars within its field of study. Philosopher John Searle characterized feminism in 1993 as a "cause to be advanced" more so than a "domain to be studied", signaling the rise in the use of feminist philosophy as a lens through which to perform science.

== Feminist philosophy of science ==
=== Objectivity and values ===
Feminist philosophers of science state that, rather being purely objective, science is necessarily biased and not value free. This branch of feminist philosophy argues that full understanding and interpretation of scientific results requires an interrogation of how gender inequities influence the credibility of research methods.

Feminist philosophers of science argue that equity and inclusion can help create more robust research methods to alleviate gender bias and produce more thorough results. For example, a lack of female research subjects and perspectives in academic research undermines the "contextual empiricism" required by true neutrality". Thus, because science is affected by social, cultural, and political agendas via funding, feminist philosophers of science believe equitable funding is a critical first step in removing biases from research and increasing autonomy of science.

The values and criticisms of the feminist philosophy of science are more broadly categorized under the idea of "Socially Responsible Science (SRS)". Socially responsible science argues for an impartial evaluation that makes a distinction between facts and values, which is necessary for the creation of "good science". In "The Source and Status of Values for Socially Responsible Science," Matthew Brown discusses the lens of being socially engaged in science as a means of "craft[ing] better ethics codes for their professional societies." He believes this is done by emphasizing "Ethics and social and political philosophy at least as much as epistemology and metaphysics." Valuing the study of ethics, politics, and social studies in understanding the basis upon which research is performed, Brown argues that a new, impartial agenda for science can be developed.

=== Standpoint and knowledge ===
The feminist philosophy of science has traditionally been highly critical of the lack of access and opportunities for women in science, resulting in scientific results that have been "distorted by sexist values." Sharon Crasnow highlights how the "exclusion of women as researchers and subjects" in scientific research, studies and projects can lead to incomplete methods and methodologies and ultimately unreliable or inaccurate results. Some feminist philosophies of science question whether science can lay claim to "impartiality, neutrality, autonomy, and indifference to political positions and the values" when the "neutral" position is benchmarked against the values held by one culture (i.e. western patriarchy) among the multitude of cultures participating in modern science.

A complete Standpoint theory contains seven parts to fully understand the location of power one has, their "epistemic privilege". Anderson lays these out in her journal Feminist Epistemology and Philosophy of Science. The first point of the theory must state the social location of the authority. The second, how large is the grasp of this authority, what does it claim privilege over. Third, what aspect of the social location allows authority. Fourth, the grounds of the authority, what justifies their privilege. Fifth, the type of epistemic privilege it is claiming to have. Sixth, the other perspectives similar to its own. Lastly, access to this privilege, by occupying the social location is it sufficient to gain access to the perspective.

Relating to Objectivity, epistemology can give a fuller understanding of the nature of scientific knowledge. Feminist epistemology is one of a group of approaches in science studies that urges us to recognize the role of the social in the production of knowledge. Feminist epistemology directs people to consider features of themselves and culture as beings of knowledge that had been outside what was considered appropriate. The goals of researchers and the values that shape the choice of goals are relevant to the knowledge we arrive at. This has implications both for how we train scientists and for how we educate everyone about science. If science is seen as more connected to application, more related to human needs and desires, traditionally underrepresented groups will have greater motivation to succeed and persist in their science courses or pursue scientific careers. Motivation will be greater as members of underrepresented groups see how science can produce knowledge that has value to their concerns in ways that are consistent with good scientific methodology. Feminist epistemology urges a continued exploration of science in this way and so has much to offer science education.

=== Criticisms of feminist epistemology in science ===
External critics of the feminist philosophy of science find several flaws in its logic and values. Because feminist philosophers argue that scientific "facts" are necessarily biased by values, one major criticisms is scientists under this epistemological constraint will "impos[e] political constraints on the conclusions it will accept" and that "truths inconvenient to a feminist perspective will be censored." Moreover, some critics contend that while values are important in the interpretation of scientific results, attention to the values present in scientific inquiry does not displace the importance of scientific evidence. Some further argue that because of the "corrosive cynicism about science" suggested by feminist critique, feminist philosophers of science may support a wholly anti-science movement.

Another criticism commonly levied at the feminist philosophy of science is that it suggests all women have the same perspectives and that objective truths can be revealed by performing science in a "feminine" way, which creates multiple issues. By homogenizing the perspectives of women into one monolithic viewpoint, the feminist philosophy of science may valorize a certain female mode of thinking that can be used to diminish individual female perspectives. Furthermore, some critics worry that promoting a feminist epistemological lens through which to perform research will result in an intellectual ghetto for female scientists, who will be pigeonholed into particular fields where feminist theory is deemed more relevant.

=== Applications of the feminist philosophy of science ===
Many applications of the feminist philosophy of science exist in recent work, with feminist epistemology applied to research a variety of scientific fields.

Feminist epistemology is particularly relevant in the area of reproductive biology. Emily Martin describes how stereotypes of male and female behavior have affected descriptions of the human fertilization process. She argues that, due to various perceptions of women throughout history, biologists have mischaracterized the interaction between egg and sperm; Martin applies the feminist philosophy of science to call for an objective model of fertilization unbiased by societal gender roles and harmful perceptions of female behavior.

Further work regarding the application of the feminist philosophy of science in evolutionary biology has been explored. Historically, evolutionary biologists assumed that the female orgasm was assumed to assist in reproduction, since it was analogous to the male orgasm, despite clear evidence to the contrary However, recent accounts describe that these assumptions were largely incorrect. Elisabeth A. Lloyd's findings from extended case studies of the female orgasm illustrate that core beliefs developed solely through assumptions predicated on gender result in major flaws in scientific research, illustrating the importance of applying feminist philosophy in academic work.

Supporters also argue that the feminist philosophy of science should be applied to primary and secondary schooling. To combat the underrepresentation of women in science, technology, engineering, and math, reforms should be implemented through a feminist philosophical viewpoint. Rather than combating gender biases in science by implementing feminist viewpoints into research and analysis, some suggest that encouraging girls to pursue STEM via educational reforms will intrinsically revert gender biases in scientific research.

== See also ==
- Feminist technoscience
