= Shannon Sullivan =

Philosopher

- Born: United States
- Occupations: Writer, professor

Shannon Sullivan is chair and Professor of Philosophy at the University of North Carolina at Charlotte. She teaches and writes on feminist philosophy, critical philosophy of race, American pragmatism, and continental philosophy.

Sullivan is the author of Living Across and Through Skins: Transactional Bodies, Pragmatism and Feminism (2001), Revealing Whiteness: The Unconscious Habits of Racial Privilege (2006), Good White People: The problem with middle-class white anti-racism (2014) and White Privilege (2019).

She is co-editor of several books, including Race and Epistemologies of Ignorance (2007).

Sullivan's recent work on the physiology of experience within oppressive structures, for example how racist or sexist encounters affect the physical body, draws on affect theory. She cited Friedrich Nietzsche, whom she called "an affect theorist before affect theory became popular," and his thinking about guilt, as having a large influence on her work. She also counted William James as a significant influence.
