= Feminist metaphysics =

Area of philosophical inquiry

Feminist metaphysics aims to question how inquiries and answers in the field of metaphysics have supported sexism. Feminist metaphysics overlaps with fields such as the philosophy of mind and philosophy of self. Feminist metaphysicians such as Sally Haslanger, Ásta, and Judith Butler have sought to explain the nature of gender in the interest of advancing feminist goals.

Another aim of feminist metaphysics has been to provide a basis for feminist activism by explaining what unites women as a group. These accounts have historically centered on cisgender women, but philosophers such as Gayle Salamon, Talia Mae Bettcher and Robin Dembroff have sought to further explain the genders of transgender and non-binary people.

== Approaches ==
=== Social constructionism ===
Feminist metaphysicians have significantly influenced social ontology by developing tools to critique and understand social realities. Social constructionism emerged in feminism as a response to biological determinist claims of female inferiority.

Existentialist philosopher Simone de Beauvoir argues in her seminal work The Second Sex that, although biological features distinguish men and women, these features neither cause nor justify the social conditions which disadvantage women. Beauvoir rejects explanations based on biology, psychoanalytic theory and historical materialism, advancing instead a phenomenological investigation influenced by Maurice Merleau-Ponty. The distinction between sex and gender in feminist theory is commonly attributed to Beauvoir.

Later theorists would challenge the commitment to the pre-social existence of sex, arguing that sex is socially constructed as well as gender. For Monique Wittig, the division of bodies into sexes is the product of a heterosexual society.

There is but sex that is oppressed and sex that oppresses. It is oppression that creates sex and not the contrary. The contrary would be to say that sex creates oppression, or to say that the cause (origin) of oppression is to be found in sex itself, in a natural division of the sexes preexisting (or outside of) society.

— Monique Wittig, "The Category of Sex"

This is expanded by Judith Butler in Gender Trouble. Butler criticizes the dependence on a pre-discursive sex upon which gender would be constructed, instead proposing gender as a performative doing.

=== Performativity ===
Drawing from J. L. Austin's speech act theory, Butler suggests that gender is performative, meaning it comes into existence through repeated social practices, gestures, and discourses that reinforce norms of masculinity and femininity. This repetition creates the illusion of a stable gender identity, but Butler emphasizes that these performances are neither voluntary nor fixed; rather, they are shaped by cultural expectations and can be subverted through alternative performances. Other influences include Friedrich Nietzsche, Michel Foucault, and Jacques Derrida.

On Butler's hypothesis, the performative aspect of gender is perhaps most obvious in drag performance, which offers a rudimentary understanding of gender binaries in its emphasis on gender performance. Butler understands drag cannot be regarded as an example of subjective or singular identity, where "there is a 'one' who is prior to gender, a one who goes to the wardrobe of gender decides with deliberation which gender it will be today". Consequently, drag should not be considered the honest expression of its performer's intent. Rather, Butler suggests that what is performed "can only be understood through reference to what is barred from the signifier within the domain of corporeal legibility".

According to Butler, gender performance is subversive because it is "the kind of effect that resists calculation", which is to say that signification is multiplicitous, that the subject is unable to control it, and so subversion is always occurring and always unpredictable. Moya Lloyd suggests that the political potential of gender performances can be evaluated relative to similar past acts in similar contexts. Conversely, Rosalyn Diprose lends a hard-line Foucauldian interpretation to her understanding of gender performance's political reach, as one's identity "is built on the invasion of the self by the gestures of others, who, by referring to other others, are already social beings". Diprose implies that the individual's will, and the individual performance, is always subject to the dominant discourse of an Other (or Others), so as to restrict the transgressive potential of performance to the inscription of simply another dominant discourse.

Ásta acknowledges the strengths of Butler's metaphysics of sex and gender, but raises concerns about the role of biological constraints in the construction of sex. She proposes a “conferralist” framework, where both sex and gender are socially constructed but subject to different constraints.

=== Psychoanalytic theory ===
The psychoanalytic elaboration of sexual difference has been particularly influential in feminist theory. It asserts that masculinity and femininity are deeply rooted in our psyches, developing alongside mental agencies such as desire and repression.

Écriture féminine is a concept from psychoanalytic French feminism that emphasizes the connection between women's writing and their bodies. French feminists argue that Western thought suppresses female experiences and reinforces phallogocentrism, and propose deconstructing language through women's distinct bodily experiences.

In This Sex Which is Not One (1977), Luce Irigaray seeks to create a psychoanalytic narrative that incorporates Lacanian ideas while challenging its phallocentric elements. Irigaray contends that women can cultivate a sense of identity and sexuality without needing to conform to phallic ideals, and that the female body is multiplicitous.

=== Female energy ===
Feminist theologian Mary Daly proposed in her work Gyn/Ecology (1978) the existence of a feminine nature that should be defended against "male barrenness". "Since female energy is essentially biophilic", she writes, "the female spirit/body is the primary target in this perpetual war of aggression against life. Gyn/Ecology is the reclaiming of life-loving female energy."

Janice Raymond had Daly as her advisor when writing The Transsexual Empire (1979), in which she states: "It is not hard to understand why transsexuals want to become lesbian-feminists. They indeed have discovered where strong female energy exists and want to capture it."

The concept was recently revisited by Sheila Jeffreys in her approach to lesbian feminism: "The rush of female energy that is present in women-only spaces is also a lesbian energy, for it creates a women-loving high."

== Debates around essentialism ==
Feminist debates surrounding gender essentialism, particularly in the 1980s and early 1990s, centered on the question of whether there are any shared characteristics common to all women that unite them as a group.

Philosophically, essentialism is the belief that things have essential properties, properties that are necessary to those things being what they are. Recontextualized within feminism, essentialism becomes the view that there are properties essential to women, in that any woman must necessarily have those properties to be a woman at all.

Linda Martín Alcoff identified two primary responses to this "identity crisis" in feminist theory: cultural feminism and post-structural feminism. Cultural feminism asserts that feminists have the exclusive right to define and evaluate woman. In contrast, the post-structuralist response rejects the possibility of defining woman altogether.

Many leading feminist thinkers of the 1970s and 1980s rejected essentialism, arguing that universal claims about women were often false and served to normalize privileged forms of femininity. However, this rejection posed a challenge to feminist politics, and in the 1990s an "anti-anti-essentialist" movement sought to reintroduce some form of essentialism as a political necessity for feminism.

== Problem of universals ==
In the context of feminist metaphysics, the problem of universals led to a division between gender realists and gender nominalists. Elizabeth Spelman identified in the 1980s a predominance of realism in Western feminist theory, which she accused of overlooking the differences between women. Nominalism has since become the hegemonic view.

== See also ==
- Ecofeminism
- Eternal feminine
- Feminist existentialism
- Materialist feminism
- Social constructionism
- Strategic essentialism
