= Bonnie Mann =

American philosopher

Bonnie J. Mann
- Awards: Gustav O. Arlt award, William's Fellow Distinguished Teaching Award

Education
- Education: Stony Brook University (PhD); Portland State University (BA)
- Thesis: Feminism and the Sublime (2002)
- Doctoral advisor: Eva Feder Kittay

Philosophical work
- Era: 21st-century philosophy
- Region: Western philosophy
- School: Continental
- Institutions: University of Oregon
- Main interests: feminist philosophy, post-Kantian philosophy, phenomenology
- Website: https://philosophy.uoregon.edu/profile/bmann/

Bonnie J. Mann is an American philosopher and professor of philosophy at the University of Oregon. She is known for her expertise on feminist philosophy. She is co-editor of Hypatia: A Journal of Feminist Philosophy.

A central claim of her work is that phenomenology, in order to be feminist, must be critical, i.e. it must depart from classical phenomenological practice. Only critical phenomenology is capable of thematizing and exploring the basic structures of the political and material world in their entanglement with systematic forms of historical injustice. After 9/11, she developed the notion of "sovereign masculinity" as a way of thematizing the link between misogyny and US nationalism.

== Biography ==
Mann was born in 1961 and grew up in a small town in Northeastern Oregon, in a large, working-class family. Her parents both grew up in ranching families, and were both military veterans. They were among the "working-poor," and Mann's views on political and economic issues were shaped by her experiences as a child. Her father worked long hours for many years in the local saw mill and the family eschewed any dependence on public assistance, though it was a struggle to meet even basic needs.

Mann excelled in school and received multiple scholarships and other financial aid, which enabled her to attend college first at the University of Portland, in Portland, Oregon, and then at Portland State University, where she received her BA in 1983. At the University of Portland, she was a student leader of what was reportedly the first student protest that institution had ever seen, over the firing of a beloved philosophy professor (Arthur. R. Luther). Her activism later focused on feminist and international issues and continued until she became a faculty member at the University of Oregon in 2003.

In 2002, Mann received her PhD in Philosophy from Stony Brook University, after a number of years alternating between activism and academic pursuits and a two-year period in which she studied and worked with feminist activists in Germany. She was influenced by the work of her dissertation advisor Eva Feder Kittay and the phenomenologist Edward S. Casey, another of her professors at Stony Brook.

An outspoken lesbian, Mann has been in a relationship with Erin Kathleen Bucklew since 1994. The couple live on a small farm near Eugene, Oregon.

== Selected publications ==
Books

- Sovereign Masculinity: Gender Lessons from the War on Terror, Oxford University Press, 2014
- Women's Liberation and the Sublime: Feminism, Postmodernism, Environment, Oxford University Press, 2006

Edited volumes

- "On ne naît pas femme: on le devient": The Life of a Sentence. Co-edited with Martina Ferrari. New York: Oxford University Press. 2017.

Op-eds

- "Marie Yovanovitch's Moral Courage" New York Times, The Stone. 2019.
- "Trump's New Taunt, Kavanaugh's Defense and how Misogyny Rules," New York Times, The Stone. 2018.
- "American Exceptionalism: The Gender Factor." E-International Relations. 2014.

Peer-reviewed articles

- "Feminist Phenomenology and the Politics of Wonder." AVANT: The Journal of the Philosophical Interdisciplinary Vanguard. vol. IX, No. 2, 2018. Published by the Centre for Philosophical Research, Warsaw, Poland.
- "The Difference of Feminist Phenomenology: The Case of Shame." PUNCTA: Journal of Critical Phenomenology (inaugural issue). 2018.
- "Femininity, Shame and Redemption," in Gender and the Politics of Shame, a special issue of Hypatia: A Journal of Feminist Philosophy, edited by Clara Fischer. Vol. 33, No. 3., 2018.
- "Beauvoir Against Objectivism: The Operation of the Norm in Beauvoir and Butler" in "On ne naît pas femme: on le devient": The Life of a Sentence. Edited by Bonnie Mann and Martina Ferrari. New York: Oxford University Press (pp. 37–53). 2017.
- "Adoption, Race and Rescue: Transracial Adoption and Lesbian/Gay Ascendency to Whiteness" in special issue of Philosophy in the Contemporary World. Co-edited with Amrita Banerjee. 23:1. Spring, 2017 (pp. 56–70). 2017.
- "Gender as Justification in Simone de Beauvoir's Le Deuxième Sexe." Sapere Aude: Journal of Philosophy, vol. 3, n. 6 (2012) Pontifíca Universidade Católica de Minas Gerais, Brazil. 2012.
- "Three White Men Walk into a Bar: Philosophy's Pluralism," in Radical Philosophy Review 16(3), 2013.
- "Creepers, Flirts, Heroes and Allies: Four Theses on Men and Sexual Harassment," in The American Philosophical Association Newsletter on Feminism and Philosophy, issue on Sexual Harassment, edited by Margaret Crouch. 2012.
- "Vampire Love: The Second Sex Negotiates the 21st Century," in Twilight and Philosophy: Vampires, Vegetarians, and the Pursuit of Immortality, edited by Rebecca Housel and JeremyWisnewski. Blackwell Press. Philosophy and Popular Culture Series, 2009. Excerpted in The Philosopher's Magazine, Issue 47, 4th Quarter, 2009. Reprinted in Introducing Philosophy through Popular Culture, ed. by William Irwin and David Kyle Johnson, Wiley-Blackwell 2010.
- "Iris Marion Young: Between Phenomenology and Structural Injustice," for Dancing with Iris: Festschrift, edited by Ann Ferguson and Mecke Nagel. Oxford University Press. 2009.
