= Sally Scholz =

American philosopher (born 1968)

Sally J. Scholz

Philosophical work
- Institutions: Villanova University
- Main interests: Feminist theory, social philosophy, political philosophy

Sally J. Scholz (born 1968) is an American Professor of Philosophy at Villanova University and former editor of Hypatia: A Journal of Feminist Philosophy. Her research focuses on social philosophy, political philosophy, and feminist theory. Her early work involves issues of violence against women, oppression and peacemaking, and then progresses to ethics of advocacy and violence against women in conflict settings, including war rape and just war theory. Her recent research involves these issues in addition to solidarity. She has published four single-author books and edited three academic journals, among many other publications.

== Education and career ==
Scholz received her Bachelor of Arts degree from University of Portland in 1989, with a double major in Philosophy and Theology and a minor in French. She received her Master of Arts in philosophy in 1991 and her Ph.D. in philosophy in 1993, both from Purdue University.

Scholz worked as a legal advocate for victims of domestic violence during her time in Indiana. She served as an assistant professor at Villanova after she received her Ph.D., and then served as a visiting scholar at Chiang Mai University and Stanford University from 1997 to 1998. She was promoted to associate professor at Villanova in 2001, becoming professor in 2006. She served as the Faculty in Residence in the Center for Peace and Justice Education from 2005 to 2010. She is currently a member of the American Philosophical Association (APA) Board as Chair of the Committee of Lectures, Publications and Research and serves as vice president of the North American Society for Social Philosophy.

== Research areas ==
Scholz's research specializes in social philosophy, political philosophy, ethics and feminist theory. Her work is influenced by Jean-Jacques Rousseau and Simone de Beauvoir. Her other early work involves issues of violence against women, oppression and peacemaking, with many essays focusing on war rape and just war theory. Her later work addresses these issues along with solidarity, as explored in her book Political Solidarity (2008). Her work on solidarity involves research on collective movements for social change and global and transnational feminist accounts of solidarity.

== Publications ==
Scholz served as Editor of APA Newsletter on Feminism and Philosophy from 2003 to 2008 and Co-editor for the Journal for Peace and Justice Studies from 2006 to 2011. She is the former Editor of Hypatia, resigning in protest in 2017 due to the Hypatia transracialism controversy that took place under her stewardship. She has published four single-author books: On de Beauvoir (2000), On Rousseau (2001), Political Solidarity (2008) and Feminism: A Beginner's Guide (2010). She co-edited Peacemaking: Lessons from the Past, Visions for the Future (2000) with Judith Presler and The Contradictions of Freedom: Philosophical Essays on Simone de Beauvoir's Les Mandarins (2005) with Shannon M. Mussett. She has published 20 peer-reviewed journal articles, 10 anthology contributions and 20 book reviews. She also contributed articles to the Encyclopedia of Global Justice (2011), edited by Deen Chatterjee.

=== Political Solidarity ===
In Political Solidarity, Scholz argues for greater nuance in the meaning of solidarity and highlights three distinct types of solidarity: social solidarity, civic solidarity, and political solidarity. She finds all three types of solidarity importantly distinct, although they do have some unifying characteristics. Scholz goes to great efforts to avoid vagueness when discussing concepts, providing concrete articulations of concepts like 'injustice' and 'oppression,' rather than resorting to vague or demagogic treatments of such concepts. Scholz notes that effective political solidarity can only occur through a "genuine mutually shared commitment to a cause." Scholz argues that political solidarity is a moral relation among humans; political solidarity with non-human animals, then, is not possible but political solidarity on behalf of nonhuman animals is. Some ecofeminists have challenged her on this point, seeking to conceptualize solidarity with non-humans. Scholz has suggested that a more fruitful approach is to think of the moral relations of social solidarity with non-human animals.
