= Miriam Solomon =

American philosopher

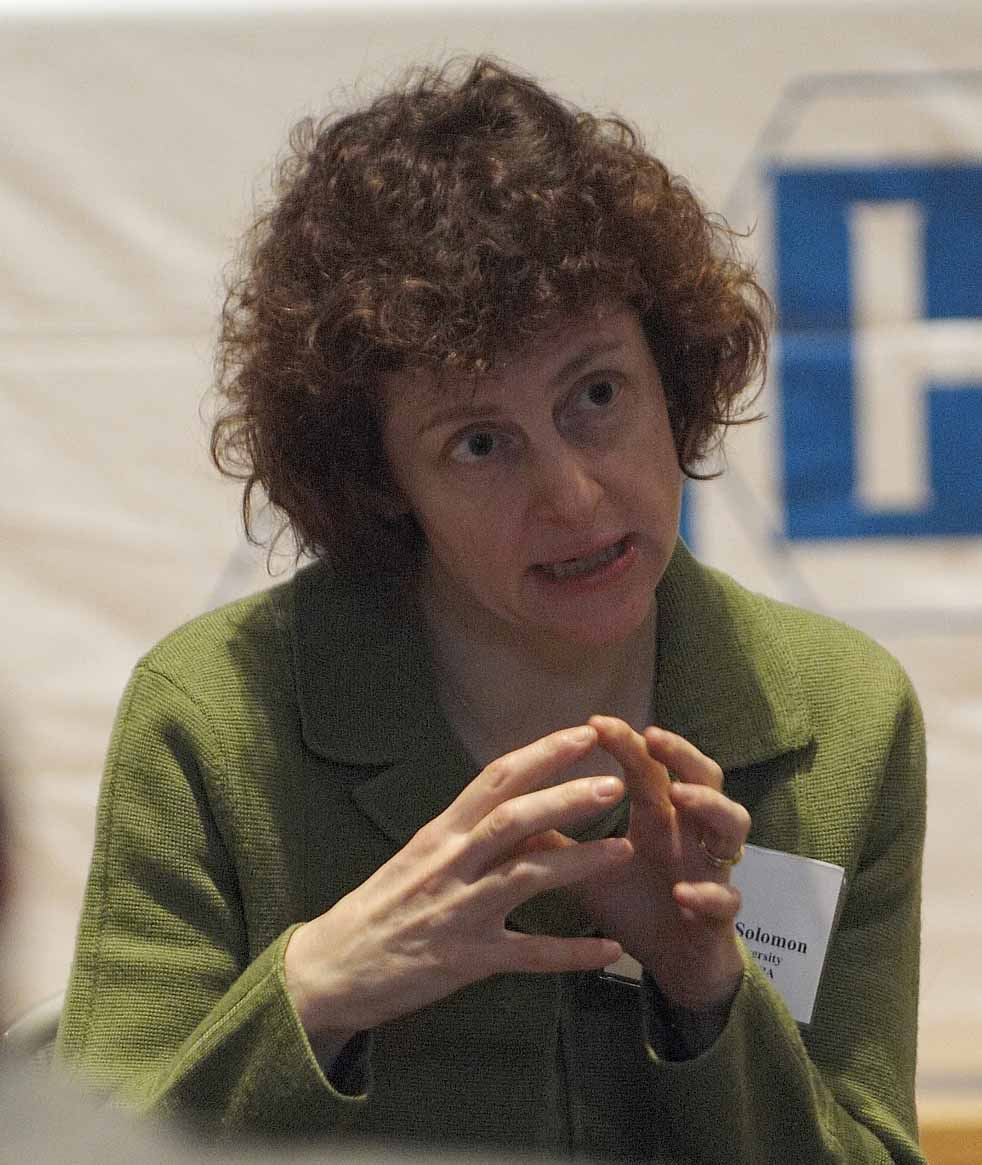
- Solomon in 2006

Philosophical work
- Institutions: Temple University
- Main interests: Philosophy of science, social epistemology, medical epistemology, medical ethics, and gender and science

Miriam Solomon is Emerita Professor of Philosophy at Temple University, where she was also Affiliated Professor of Women's Studies. Solomon's work focuses on the philosophy of science, social epistemology, medical epistemology, medical ethics, and gender and science. Besides her academic appointments, she has published two books (Social Empiricism and Making Medical Knowledge) and a large number of peer reviewed journal articles, and she has served on the editorial boards of a number of major journals.

== Education and career ==
Solomon graduated from Newnham College, Cambridge University in 1979 with a BA in Natural Sciences. She went on to receive a doctorate in philosophy from Harvard University in 1986.

She was a Teaching Fellow at Harvard University while working towards her doctorate, after which she accepted an Assistant Professorship of Philosophy at the University of Cincinnati in 1986 before accepting an Assistant Professorship at Temple University in 1991. She received a cross appointment in the Women's Studies department in 1993, was promoted to Associate Professor of Philosophy in 1994, and full Professor in 2003. She was the Chair of the Department of Philosophy at Temple University until her retirement in 2024. She also was a Mellon Fellow at the University of Pennsylvania for the 1990-91 year, a visiting instructor of philosophy at the University of Pennsylvania in 1994 and 2003, and a visiting lecturer at Vienna International Summer University in 2007.

Besides her academic appointments, Solomon has served on the editorial board of the journal Social Epistemology from 1991 to 1994, the editorial board of the journal Episteme from 2002 to 2005, and the editorial board of Philosophy of Science from 1994 to the present. She is also a member of the governing board of the Philosophy of Science Association, serves as editor of the Stanford Encyclopedia of Philosophy for topics related to the philosophy of science, and is a member of the advisory board of the Society for Philosophy and Medicine. She is additionally a member of the advisory board for the Society for the Philosophy of Science in Practice, and a member of the steering committee of the International Philosophy of Medicine Roundtable.

== Research areas ==
Solomon's work has focused heavily on the philosophy of science, as well as issues that lie at the intersection of medicine and philosophy, epistemology, ethics, and gender. She has written on a wide variety of other issues, including feminist radical empiricism, the intersection of feminism and Orthodox Judaism, and the work of Willard Quine and Laurence BonJour. Her book Social Empiricism put forward a social account of scientific rationality that focuses on empirical success and finds dissent to be the normal state of scientific inquiry. Much of her current work has revolved around innovations on medical epistemology, including evidence-based medicine, translational medicine, narrative medicine, and consensus conferences.

== Publications ==
Solomon has published two books, Social Empiricism (MIT Press, 2001) and Making Medical Knowledge (Oxford University Press, 2015). She has also published a large number of peer-reviewed journal articles in journals such as the Journal of Philosophy, Philosophy of Science, and Hypatia: A Journal of Feminist Philosophy.

=== Social Empiricism ===
In Social Empiricism, Solomon argues that scientific dissent is not a situation in need of resolution to consensus, but the normal state of healthy scientific inquiry. She suggests a normative framework that assesses scientific rationality at the level of the scientific community rather than the individual scientist. Solomon attempts to show that individual rationality is not as important a norm as is commonly claimed, and that it is not cause for concern when individual scientists disagree about the proper direction of research. Solomon takes the findings of sociologists, anthropologists and feminist critics of science seriously, and thinks that they undercut traditional philosophical models of rationality, but that they do not eliminate the need for some normative judgements. As long as all theories being pursued yield some unique empirical successes, Solomon argues that their pursuit is worthwhile and even consistent with the common view that science aims at truth. In Solomon's view, competing scientific theories can even be inconsistent with one another while each containing some degree of truth. It is not possible to know at the time which features of a successful theory are responsible for its empirical success, and successful theories often have core assumptions that are incorrect. Only in hindsight can the truth "in a theory" be discerned, a situation that Solomon coins "whig realism." In Solomon's view, even if scientists or scientific communities use poor reasoning and flawed practices in arriving at their conclusions, the only matter of import is whether or not they achieve new empirical successes.

=== Making Medical Knowledge ===
Making Medical Knowledge is an historical and philosophical inquiry into the methods used to produce medical knowledge. The emphasis is on methods developed since the 1970s, specifically consensus conferences, evidence-based medicine, translational medicine and narrative medicine. The book argues that the familiar dichotomy between the art and the science of medicine is not adequate for understanding this plurality of methods. Solomon proposes a pluralistic account of methods in medicine, and shows how the methods developed, partly in reaction to each other's perceived shortcomings.

== See also ==
- Hypatia transracialism controversy
