= Elizabeth V. Spelman =

American philosopher

Elizabeth V. Spelman (April 3, 1945 – December 26, 2025) was a philosopher in the United States. She was Barbara Richmond 1940 Chair in the Humanities at Smith College, Northampton, Massachusetts, teaching there from 1982 until her retirement in 2024.

== Studies ==
Her studies focus on four aspects: critical race feminism, emotions being shaped, repair activities of humans, and humans as waste makers. Critical race theory is "a critical examination of society and culture, to the intersection of race, law, and power". However, Spelman's interpretation of this theory also involves women. She expresses her thoughts about the subject in her book titled Inessential Woman: Problems of Exclusion in Feminist Thought. This book focuses on her studies of race and gender together. Her book titled Fruits of Sorrow: Framing our Attention to Suffering, focuses on her studies of human emotions. She believes politics and interactions between humans cannot be separated from our emotions. They influence one another. The emotion that is focused on in this book is that of human suffering. Her studies regard what can come about from suffering. She notes that not all things that come about from suffering are bad. She focuses on three ways people who suffer can be seen: "tragic figures, or objects of compassion, or bearers of experiences from which others can learn or otherwise profit". In this book she attempts to discover the meaning and significance of human suffering. Her studies involve the suffering of oneself as well as that of others. Her studies of repair activities of humans is published in her book titled Repair: The Impulse to Restore a Fragile World. This book ties into her other piece, Fruits of Sorrow. While that book shows the imperfections of life, e.g. the fact that things break, this piece shows humans' needs to fix them. Her book delves into what makes humans human. We naturally attempt to fix things that are broken or wrong in our lives.

Her 2016 book Trash Talks: Revelations in the Rubbish focuses on the complex relationship between human beings and waste.

== Influences on feminist philosophy ==
Spelman presents many ideas that impact the branch of feminist philosophy. Spelman "holds that social conditioning creates femininity" and therefore all around the world a definition of femininity is different. Though she does believe that women raised in different cultures are different, she also believes all women have something in common to one another. Another point that Spelman emphasizes is that of social standings. She states, "no woman is subject to any form of oppression simply because she is a woman; which forms of oppression she is subject to depend on what "kind" of woman she is". Just like men, women are treated differently based upon race, religion, sexual orientation, etc. Each of which play a part in how a woman is seen in society.

== Personal life and death ==
Spelman passed away on December 26, 2025 after a brief illness.
