= Noëlle McAfee =

American philosopher

Philosophical work
- Institutions: Emory University, University of Massachusetts, Lowell, George Mason University, American University Brandeis University,
- Main interests: Social philosophy, political philosophy, democratic theory, feminist theory, American philosophy, Continental philosophy

Noëlle McAfee is a professor of philosophy and affiliated faculty in women's, gender, and sexuality studies and psychoanalytic studies at Emory University, where she has taught since 2010. McAfee previously taught at several other universities, including serving as Allen-Berenson Visiting Associate Professor of Philosophy and Women's Studies at Brandeis University. She has worked extensively in democratic theory, new media, and psychoanalytic theories of the public sphere. McAfee is currently the co-chair of Public Philosophy Network, associate editor of the Kettering Review, and has spent a number of years engaged in political issues in Washington, D.C., both before and during her academic career.

== Education and career ==
McAfee received a bachelor's degree in history from the University of Texas at Austin in 1986, and a master's degree in public policy from Duke University in 1987. After receiving her initial degrees, before journeying into academic philosophy, McAfee was an organizer and policy advocate in the Washington D.C. area. She worked for Public Citizen's Congress Watch from 1987 to 1988, was the chairperson of the D.C. local of the National Writers Union from 1988 to 1989, and the vice president at large of the National Writers Union in 1990 and 1991. While working as a public interest activist in Washington, D.C., McAfee began to worry that this work would be in vain if people were not really interested in nor capable of democratic self-government.

To address these concerns, she returned to academia to study philosophy. She received a master's degree in philosophy from the University of Wisconsin-Madison in 1990, the same year she became associate editor of the Kettering Review. She went on to receive her doctorate in philosophy from the University of Texas at Austin in 1998. McAfee's research gave her cause to believe that democratic self-government is in fact possible, and within a few years of her first book she resumed her research and engagement in democratic practice, including new work in new media, and post-conflict democratization.

McAfee began her academic career as a lecturer in political theory in the Department of Government at UT Austin in 1998–1999, before accepting an appointment as assistant professor in the Department of Philosophy at the University of Massachusetts Lowell, where she served from 1999 to 2003, when she was promoted to associate professor, a position she occupied until 2007. In 2005 she helped found the Future of Public Media Project at American University as part of an initiative funded by the Ford Foundation. After leaving the University of Massachusetts, McAfee accepted a position at the School for Conflict Analysis and Resolution at George Mason University, where she stayed from 2008 to 2010, before accepting a dual appointment at Emory University as associate professor of philosophy and affiliate of women, gender, and sexuality studies. In 2013, McAfee was promoted to full professor at Emory.

McAfee has accepted a number of temporary academic appointments in addition to her permanent positions. In 2004 she accepted an appointment as the Allen-Berenson Visiting Associate Professor of Philosophy and Women's Studies at Brandeis University, before becoming a scholar-in-residence at American University in 2005 (where she stayed on as a research professor in 2006.) McAfee also served as a visiting associate professor of philosophy at George Mason University from 2006 to 2008. McAfee has also served in a wide number of academic administrative roles, including serving as the director of the Gender Studies program and the director of the Honors Program, both at varying times at the University of Massachusetts, Lowell. She has also served as the deputy director of the Center for Social Media for American University's School of Communications, and has occupied a number of other posts.

Besides her academic appointments, McAfee has also founded and directed the Council for Public Media in Austin, Texas, from 1991 to 1995, on the board of the National Writers United Service Organization from 1995 to 1997, as a board member of Public Deliberation '96, as an advisor for various research projects and in various other politically minded roles since. She began to serve as a consultant to the Kettering Foundation in 1988, and continues to do so.

She is a member of the editorial advisory board for Public Philosophy Journal.

As of 2024, McAfee is the chair of Emory's philosophy department. On April 25, 2024, she was arrested as part of a crackdown on the anti-war in Gaza protest on the university's campus. As of Thursday, April 23, 2026, professor McAfee is suing Emory as a plaintiff because she alleges the university violated its own free expression policies by calling in police to break up a 2024 Gaza protest, leading to her wrongful arrest and prosecution, and she wants to hold the university accountable so such actions are not repeated.

== Research areas ==
McAfee's research primarily focuses on questions of democracy and democratic practice, the same questions that had her enter academic philosophy in the first place. Her most recent research draws on prior work in psychoanalytic theory, democratic media, performative ethics, transitional justice, and feminist political theory to examine the role of informal political institutions in the formation of a democratic public. McAfee has done significant work on the writings of Julia Kristeva and Jürgen Habermas, and also delved extensively into feminist theory and the works of Hannah Arendt.

== Publications ==
McAfee has authored three books; the first, Habermas, Kristeva, and Citizenship was published by Cornell University Press in 2000; the second Julia Kristeva was published in 2003 by Routledge, and the third Democracy and the Political Unconscious was published in 2008 by Columbia University Press. A fourth book, tentatively titled Democracy Otherwise is in progress. McAfee has also served as editor for a number of books and journal issues, and has also published a large number of peer-reviewed papers and several encyclopedia articles.

Habermas, Kristeva, and Citizenship attempts to join the discourses of modernity and postmodernity in political theory and bring them to bear on the problem of deliberative democracy. McAfee's view is strongly informed by feminist theory; she believes that political life is rooted in participation in public activity, and that political agency is best understood not as a trait of rational individuals, but rather as something enacted collectively through interactions with others in civil society.

McAfee's Democracy and the Political Unconscious examines some of the pathologies that have been created in the United States in the wake of the Collapse of the World Trade Center. She believes that the way that the event was handled has resulted in the United States continually reliving the trauma of that day, and believes that the war on terror is one significant cause of this cycle of unending trauma. She points towards South Africa's Truth and Reconciliation Commission as a model of how the United States could move past that trauma.
