= Trans: Gender and Race in an Age of Unsettled Identities =

2016 book by Rogers Brubaker

- Author: Rogers Brubaker
- Genre: Academic
- Publisher: Princeton University Press
- Publication date: 2016
- Publication place: United States
- Media type: Print
- Pages: 236
- ISBN: 9780691172354

Trans: Gender and Race in an Age of Unsettled Identities by American sociologist Rogers Brubaker is an analysis of racial and gender identity, published by Princeton University Press in 2016 in the wake of the publicity around Caitlyn Jenner and Rachel Dolezal.

== Summary ==
Brubaker's purpose is to compare the similarities and differences of the internal logic of gender and race. Brubaker examines gender and racial identity by comparing the Essentialist and Voluntarist perspectives. The "Essentialist" view, writes Brubaker, assumes gender and race are grounded in "nature" and "history". The "Voluntarists", by contrast says Brubaker, argue that race and gender identities can be "chosen." Brubaker observes that the Essentialists emphasise the immutability of the external world while Voluntarists emphasises individual self-determination. However, despite the differences between both approaches, they both recognise some similarities in the "'if Jenner, then Dolezal' syllogism."

Complicating the analysis argues Brubaker is the way in which, on the political left, race is a "more closely policed category" than gender, compared to the political right where sex and gender are "more closely policed." Additionally, changing gender identity is given more sociological "legitimacy" than changing race. The question of legitimacy is part of what Brubaker describes as "boundary work"—the demarcation of what should be regarded as science and therefore afforded certain privileges of "resources, respect and authority".

Brubaker then notes how the "paring of transracial and transgender in the Dolezal debates points to an underlying shift in the landscape of identities." He cites wider debates about immigration, religion and ethnicity examples of this. In an aside Brubaker notes that "syncretism, the mixing of elements from different religious traditions, illustrates the trans of between, as do those who identify with or participate in more than one religious community or tradition."

Brubaker concludes by observing that the focus on "idiosyncratic aspects" of Dolezal's story has obscured the deeper trends in the way people think about identity. However he also notes in his conclusion that the increasing fluidity of identity has not excluded these identities being "embodied" or expressed practically and physically.

== Reception ==
The book was received positively. Anthony Moran writing in the journal Ethnic and Racial Studies said it was "an important intervention in debates about sexual/gender and racial/ethnic identities in a period of generalized identity unsettlement." A. Loudermilk in PopMatters said, "Looking back at the summer of 2015 and the public debate over Dolezal, Brubaker sees a missed opportunity."

== See also ==
- Race and ethnicity in the United States
- Multiracial Americans, and its section on Racial passing and ambiguity
- Passing (sociology)
- Passing (racial identity)
- Passing (gender)
