= Lisa Tessman =

American philosopher

Philosophical work
- Era: 21st-century philosophy
- Region: Western philosophy
- School: Feminist philosophy
- Institutions: Binghamton University, University of Oslo
- Main interests: Ethics, Moral psychology, Feminist philosophy
- Notable ideas: Burdened virtues, moral failure under nonideal conditions

Lisa Tessman is a philosophy professor at Binghamton University in New York and a senior researcher at the University of Oslo. From 2023 to 2024, she was president of the Eastern Division of the American Philosophical Association (APA). Her work focuses on ethics, moral psychology, and feminist philosophy, especially on how people experience morality under non-ideal and oppressive conditions.

== Selected works ==
- Burdened virtues: virtue ethics for liberatory struggles. Oxford University Press. 2005. ISBN 9780195179149.
- Moral Failure: On the Impossible Demands of Morality (Oxford University Press 2015)
- When Doing the Right Thing Is Impossible (Oxford University Press 2017)

== Research ==
Tessman's research integrates ethics with a feminist approach, focusing on the social and political conditions under which moral experiences occur. Her first monograph was Burdened Virtues: Virtue Ethics for Liberatory Struggles, explores how practicing certain virtues under oppressive conditions may be costly to the individuals who embody them.

Her second monograph, Moral Failure, investigates the experience of unavoidable moral conflict and the impossibility of always meeting moral demands. Drawing from sources such as Holocaust testimony, feminist care ethics, and debates on moral demandingness, she examines how contradictory moral requirements can still carry moral authority.

She has also edited the volume Feminist Ethics and Social and Political Philosophy: Theorizing the Non-Ideal and co-edited Jewish Locations: Traversing Racialized Landscapes.

== Professional activities ==
Tessman is a founding member of the Association for Feminist Ethics and Social Theory (FEAST), and served on its steering committee from 1999 to 2011 including roles as chair of the committee, the program committee, and the diversity committee.

She has also been on the Board of Associate Editors for Hypatia: A Journal of Feminist Philosophy since 2009. Tessman also served on the APA Committee on Inclusiveness in the Profession and on the Distinguished Woman Philosopher Award Selection Committee for the Society for Women in Philosophy (SWIP).
