= Rogers Brubaker =

American sociologist

Academic background
- Education: BA, social studies, Harvard University, 1979; MA, social and political thought, University of Sussex, 1980; PhD, sociology, Columbia University, 1990

Academic work
- Institutions: University of California, Los Angeles

Rogers Brubaker (/ˈbruːbeɪkər/; born 1956) is professor of sociology at University of California, Los Angeles and UCLA Foundation Chair. He has written academic works on social theory, immigration, citizenship, nationalism, ethnicity, religion, diasporas, gender, populism, and digital hyperconnectivity.

Born in Evanston, Illinois, Brubaker attended Harvard University and the University of Sussex before receiving a PhD from Columbia University in 1990.

== Selected works ==
- (1984). The Limits of Rationality: An Essay on the Social and Moral thought of Max Weber, Taylor & Francis. ISBN 978-0-04-301173-7
- (1992). Citizenship and nationhood in France and Germany, Harvard University Press. ISBN 978-0-674-13178-1
- (1996). Nationalism reframed: nationhood and the national question in the New Europe, Cambridge University Press. ISBN 978-0-521-57649-9
- (2004). Ethnicity without groups, Harvard University Press. ISBN 978-0-674-01539-5
- (2006). Nationalist politics and everyday ethnicity in a Transylvanian town, Princeton University Press. ISBN 978-0-691-12834-4
- (2015). Grounds for difference, Harvard University Press. ISBN 978-0-674-74396-0
- (2016). Trans: Gender and Race in an Age of Unsettled Identities. Princeton University Press.
- (2022). Hyperconnectivity and Its Discontents, Polity Press. ISBN 978-1-509-55454-6
- (2026) Gender Identity: The Career of a Category, Polity Press ISBN 978-1509575558
