= Cressida Heyes =

Philosopher

Cressida J. Heyes (born 1970) is a British and naturalized Canadian philosopher, currently employed as the Henry Marshall Tory Chair at the University of Alberta, Edmonton, and formerly as the Canada Research Chair in Philosophy of Gender and Sexuality. Educated at Oxford University (BA) and McGill University (MA and PhD), Heyes has also taught at Michigan State University. Her latest book, Anaesthetics of Existence: Essays on Experience at the Edge (Duke University Press 2020) is the winner of the David Easton prize from the Foundations of Political Thought committee of the American Political Science Association, and a finalist for the 2020 Book Award from the North American Society for Social Philosophy. She is currently writing a feminist philosophy of sleep.

Her areas of specialization are philosophy of gender and sexuality, feminism, contemporary social and political thought, and theories of embodiment, as well as the work of philosophers including Michel Foucault and Ludwig Wittgenstein.

== Publications ==
Her publications include:

- Anaesthetics of Existence: Essays on Experience at the Edge. Durham: Duke University Press, 2020.
- Cosmetic Surgery: A Feminist Primer (edited with Meredith Jones). Farnham: Ashgate Publishing, 2009.
- Self-Transformations: Foucault, Ethics, and Normalized Bodies. Oxford: Oxford University Press, 2007.
- The Grammar of Politics: Wittgenstein and Political Philosophy. Ithaca, NY: Cornell University Press, 2003. (edited volume)
- Line Drawings: Defining Women Through Feminist Practice. Ithaca, NY: Cornell University Press, 2000.
