= Feminist philosophy =

Approach to philosophy from a feminist perspective

Feminist philosophy is an approach to philosophy from a feminist perspective and also the employment of philosophical methods to feminist topics and questions. Feminist philosophy involves both reinterpreting philosophical texts and methods in order to supplement the feminist movement and attempts to criticise or re-evaluate the ideas of traditional philosophy from within a feminist framework.

== Main features ==
Feminist philosophy is united by a central concern with gender. It also typically involves some form of commitment to justice for women, whatever form that may take. Aside from these uniting features, feminist philosophy is a diverse field covering a wide range of topics from a variety of approaches. Broadening further, feminist philosophy entails how race, sexuality, socioeconomic class, and other factors of identity impact gender inequalities. Feminist philosophers, as philosophers, are found in both the analytic and continental traditions, and a myriad of different viewpoints are taken on philosophical issues within those traditions. Feminist philosophers, as feminists, can also belong to many different varieties of feminism.

Feminist philosophy can be understood to have three main functions:

1. Drawing on philosophical methodologies and theories to articulate and theorize about feminist concerns and perspectives. This can include providing a philosophical analysis of concepts regarding identity (such as race, socio-economic status, gender, sexuality, ability, and religion) and concepts that are very widely used and theorised within feminist theory more broadly. Feminist philosophy has also been an important source for arguments for gender equality.
2. Investigating sexism and androcentrism within the philosophical tradition. This can involve critiquing texts and theories that are typically classified as part of the philosophical canon, especially by focusing on their presentation of women and women's experiences or the exclusion of women from the philosophical tradition. Another significant trend is the rediscovery of the work of many female philosophers whose contributions have not been recognised.
3. Contributing to philosophy with new approaches to existing questions as well as new questions and fields of research in light of their critical inquiries into the philosophical tradition and reflecting their concern with gender.

Feminist philosophy existed before the twentieth century but became labelled as such in relation to the discourse of second-wave feminism of the 1960s and 1970s. Many theories during the second wave focused primarily on gender equality in the workplace and education. An important project of feminist philosophy that emerged from the third-wave feminism movement has been to incorporate the diversity of experiences of women from different racial groups and socioeconomic classes, as well as of women around the globe.

== Subfields ==
Feminist philosophers work within a broad range of subfields, including:

- Feminist epistemology, which challenges traditional philosophical ideas of knowledge and rationality as objective, universal, or value-neutral. Feminist epistemologists often argue for the importance of perspective, social situation, and values in generating knowledge, including in the sciences.
- Feminist ethics often argues that the emphasis on objectivity, rationality, and universality in traditional moral thought excludes women's ethical realities. One of the most notable developments is the ethics of care, which values empathy, responsibility, and non-violence in the development of moral systems. Care ethics also involve a greater recognition of interpersonal connections and relations of care and dependency, and feminist ethics uses this to critique how ethics of justice is often rooted in patriarchal understandings of morality. Some feminist ethicists have shown concern about how values ascribed to an ethics of care are often associated with femaleness, and how such a connection can bolster ideas about moral development as essentially gendered.
- Feminist phenomenology investigates how both cognitive faculties (e.g., thinking, interpreting, remembering, knowing) and the construction of normativity within social orders combine to shape an individual's reality. Phenomenology in feminist philosophy is often applied to develop improved conceptions of gendered embodied experience, of intersubjectivity and relational life, and to the community, society, and political phenomena. Feminist phenomenology goes beyond other representation-focused discourses by centering personal and embodied experiences, as well as recognizing how experience often operates outside of language, so can be difficult to articulate. Reflection upon time as a construct is a more recent development in feminist phenomenology; recent works have begun investigating temporality's place in the field, and how a more complex understanding of temporality can further illuminate realities of gendered experience and existence.
- Feminist aesthetics, which concerns the role of gender and sexuality in art and aesthetic theorising, and deals with issues related to the subjectivity of creators, the reproduction of gendered norms in art, the role of art in enculturation, and representation of women in art, both as subjects and creators. An understanding of "women" and "artists" as mutually exclusive identities has been reproduced since at least the era of romanticism, and this division has made interventions by feminist aesthetics necessary to challenge the patriarchal and masculine state of aesthetics.
- Feminist metaphysics, focuses largely on the ontology of gender and sex and the nature of social construction. Feminist historians of philosophy also examine sex biases inherent in traditional metaphysical theories. One of the main points at which this field diverges from classical metaphysics is in its attempts to ground social constructs into understandings of the "fundamental" and "natural", around which metaphysics is built around. Feminist metaphysics attempts to balance the relationship between social constructs and reality by recognizing how the distinction between what is perceived as "real" and what is "socially constructed" creates a binary that fails to acknowledge the interplay between the two concepts. Similarly, this field works to challenge systems of classifications that are deemed natural, and therefore unbiased, by revealing how such systems are affected by political and moral ideologies and biases. Some theorists have raised questions regarding whether certain fundamental aspects of metaphysics inherently oppose a feminist approach, and so the relationship between feminism and metaphysics remains somewhat precarious.
- Feminist philosophy of science, which is rooted in interdisciplinary academic feminism, works to challenge how the production of scientific knowledge as well as the methodologies employed in such productions are not free of bias. Contrary to other perceptions of science, the feminist philosophy of science recognizes the practice of science as value-rich instead of value-free, suggesting that ideologies, such as those related to gender, are tied up within the models and practices that constitute what science is and what knowledge it produces.

== See also ==
- Analytical feminism
- Ethics of care
- Ethics of justice
- Feminist philosophy of science
- Hypatia transracialism controversy
- Nikidion
- Socialist feminism
- Women in philosophy
