= Ethics of care =

Ethical theory

The ethics of care (alternatively care ethics or EoC) is a normative ethical theory that holds that moral action centers on interpersonal relationships and care or benevolence as a virtue. EoC is one of a cluster of normative ethical theories that were developed by some feminists and environmentalists since the 1980s. While consequentialist and deontological ethical theories emphasize generalizable standards and impartiality, ethics of care emphasize the importance of response to the individual. The distinction between the general and the individual is reflected in their different moral questions: "what is just?" versus "how to respond?" Carol Gilligan, who is considered the originator of the ethics of care, criticized the application of generalized standards as "morally problematic, since it breeds moral blindness or indifference".

Assumptions of the framework include: persons are understood to have varying degrees of dependence and interdependence; other individuals affected by the consequences of one's choices deserve consideration in proportion to their vulnerability; and situational details determine how to safeguard and promote the interests of individuals.

== Historical background ==
The originator of the ethics of care was Carol Gilligan, an American ethicist and psychologist. Gilligan created this model as a critique of her mentor, developmental psychologist Lawrence Kohlberg's model of moral development. Gilligan observed that measuring moral development by Kohlberg's stages of moral development found boys to be more morally mature than girls, and this result held for adults as well (although when education is controlled for there are no gender differences). Gilligan argued that Kohlberg's model was not objective, but rather a masculine perspective on morality, founded on principles of justice and rights. In her 1982 book In a Different Voice, she further posited that men and women have tendencies to view morality in different terms. Her theory stated that women tended to emphasize empathy and compassion over the notions of morality in terms of abstract duties or obligations that are privileged in Kohlberg's scale. Subsequent research suggests that the differences in care-based or justice-based ethical approaches may be due to gender differences, or differences in life situations of genders. Gilligan's summarizing of gender differences provided feminists with a voice to question moral values and practices of the society as masculine.

== Relationship to traditional ethical positions ==
Care ethics is different from other ethical models, such as consequentialist theories (e.g. utilitarianism) and deontological theories (e.g. Kantian ethics), in that it seeks to incorporate traditionally feminine virtues and values which, proponents of care ethics contend, are absent in traditional models of ethics. One of these values is the placement of caring and relationship over logic and reason. In care ethics, reason and logic are subservient to natural care, that is, care that is done out of inclination. This is in contrast to deontology, where actions taken out of inclination are unethical.

Virginia Held has noted the similarities between care ethics and virtue ethics but distinguished it from the virtue ethics of British moralists such as Hume in that people are seen as fundamentally relational rather than independent individuals. Other philosophers have argued about the relation between care ethics and virtue ethics, taking various positions on the question of how closely the two are related. Jason Josephson Storm argued for close parallels between the ethics of care and traditional Buddhist virtue ethics, especially the prioritization of compassion by Śāntideva and others. Other scholars had also previously connected ethics of care with Buddhist ethics.

== Care ethics as feminist ethics ==
While some feminists have criticized care-based ethics for reinforcing traditional gender stereotypes, others have embraced parts of the paradigm under the theoretical concept of care-focused feminism.

Care-focused feminism, alternatively called gender feminism, is a branch of feminist thought informed primarily by the ethics of care as developed by Carol Gilligan and Nel Noddings. This theory is critical of how caring is socially engendered, being assigned to women and consequently devalued. "Care-focused feminists regard women's capacity for care as a human strength" which can and should be taught to and expected of men as well as women. Noddings proposes that ethical caring could be a more concrete evaluative model of moral dilemma, than an ethic of justice. Noddings' care-focused feminism requires practical application of relational ethics, predicated on an ethic of care.

Ethics of care is a basis for care-focused feminist theorizing on maternal ethics. These theories recognize caring as an ethically relevant issue. Critical of how society engenders caring labor, theorists Sara Ruddick, Virginia Held, and Eva Feder Kittay suggest caring should be performed and care givers valued in both public and private spheres. This proposed paradigm shift in ethics encourages the view that an ethic of caring be the social responsibility of both men and women.

Joan Tronto argues that the definition of "ethic of care" is ambiguous due in part to it not playing a central role in moral theory. She argues that considering moral philosophy is engaged with human goodness, then care would appear to assume a significant role in this type of philosophy. However, this is not the case and Tronto further stresses the association between care and "naturalness". The latter term refers to the socially and culturally constructed gender roles where care is mainly assumed to be the role of the woman. As a result, care loses the power to take a central role in moral theory.

Tronto states there are four ethical qualities of care:

1. Attentiveness: Attentiveness is crucial to the ethics of care because care requires a recognition of others' needs in order to respond to them. The question which arises is the distinction between ignorance and inattentiveness. Tronto poses this question as follows: "But when is ignorance simply ignorance, and when is it inattentiveness?"
2. Responsibility: In order to care, we must take responsibility ourselves. The problem associated with this second ethical element of responsibility is the question of obligation. Obligation is often tied to pre-established societal and cultural norms and roles. Tronto makes the effort to differentiate the terms "responsibility" and "obligation" concerning the ethic of care. Responsibility is ambiguous, whereas obligation refers to situations where action or reaction is due, such as the case of a legal contract. This ambiguity allows for ebb and flow in and between class structures and gender roles, and to other socially constructed roles that would bind responsibility to those in such roles.
3. Competence: To provide care also requires competence. If one acknowledges the need to care and accepts responsibility but does not follow through adequately, the care needs will not be met.
4. Responsiveness: This refers to the "responsiveness of the care receiver to the care". Tronto states, "Responsiveness signals an important moral problem within care: by its nature, care is concerned with conditions of vulnerability and inequality." She further argues that responsiveness does not equal reciprocity. Rather, it is another method to understand vulnerability and inequality by understanding what has been expressed by those in the vulnerable position, as opposed to re-imagining oneself in a similar situation.

In 2013, Tronto added a fifth ethical quality:

5. Plurality, communication, trust and respect; solidarity or caring with: Together, these are the qualities necessary for people to come together in order to take collective responsibility, to understand their citizenship as always imbricated in relations of care, and to take seriously the nature of caring needs in society.

== In politics ==
It is often suggested that the ethics of care is only applicable within families and groups of friends, but many feminist theorists have argued against this suggestion, including Ruddick, Manning, Held, and Tronto. Attempts have been made to apply principles from the ethics of care more generally, by identifying values in one particular caring relationship and applying these values to other situations. Moral values are seen as embedded in acts of care.

The ethics of care is contrasted with theories based on the "liberal individual" and a social contract, following Locke and Hobbes. Ethics-of-care theorists note that in many situations, such as childhood, there are very large power imbalances between individuals, and so these relationships are based on care rather than any form of contract. Noting the power imbalances that can exist in society, it is argued that care may be a better basis to understand society than freedom and social contracts.

== In contemporary art ==
Care ethics has been applied to artistic practice, methodology, and institutional culture under the framework of ethics of care in contemporary art. Rooted in the foundational work of Mierle Laderman Ukeles, whose Manifesto for Maintenance Art (1969) elevated everyday acts of maintenance, as cleaning, repairing, sustaining, to the status of artistic practice, ethics of care in the contemporary art foregrounds process over product, collective maintenance over individual authorship, and interdependence over creative autonomy. These principles have since expanded into socially engaged art, participatory practice, community-based creation, and feminist institutional critique.

=== Texts and Critical Perspectives ===
- Visible: art as policies for care: socially engaged art 2010-ongoing : Book (2024, NERO Editions), edited by Martina Angelotti, Matteo Lucchetti and Judith Wielander, on socially engaged art (2010–ongoing), featuring projects by Tania Bruguera, Forensic Architecture, and Zanele Muholi, exploring art as a form of care policy in relation to social, political, and ecological issues.
- From cultural feminism to the ethics of care : Call for papers (2023, Grenoble, France: Université Grenoble Alpes) for a conference on ecofeminist art, examining its development from the 1970s to the present, with a focus on cultural feminism and care ethics.
- Radicalizing Care : Feminist and Queer Activism in Curating : Book (2021, Berlin, Germany: Sternberg Press) by Lesia Prokopenko, Nataša Petrešin-Bachelez, Edna Bonhomme and others, exploring how feminist and queer care ethics inform curatorial practices through essays, case studies, and manifestos.
- What’s Love (or Care, Intimacy, Warmth, Affection) Got to Do with It? : Book (2017, Berlin, Germany: Sternberg Press & e-flux Books), with contributions by Paul Chan, Martha Rosler, Fred Moten and others, examining how care, intimacy, and desire have been addressed and theorized in socially engaged practices and writings since 2009.

== In mental health ==
Psychiatrist Kaila Rudolph noted that care ethics aligns with a trauma-informed care framework in psychiatry.

== In engineering education ==
In engineering education, the ethics of care has been applied in four overlapping ways. First, as a way of teaching, it emphasizes caring relationships and learning environments that support students’ participation, inclusion, and ethical agency. Second, as a normative framework for sociotechnical judgment, it guides engineering design and decision-making by emphasizing attentiveness to stakeholders’ needs, responsibilities, and the consequences of technological choices. Third, as an approach to accountable community engagement, it promotes collaboration with, rather than for, communities affected by engineering projects, recognizing their knowledge and agency. Fourth, as a political and institutional perspective, it examines how care responsibilities are distributed, whose care work is recognized or overlooked, and how institutional structures enable or constrain caring practices. A systematic review of the literature identified these four strands while highlighting limited empirical evidence on how care is enacted, received, and sustained in practice.

== Criticism ==
In the field of nursing, the ethics of care has been criticized by Peter Allmark, Helga Kuhse, and John Paley. Allmark criticized its focus on the mental state of the carer, on the grounds that subjectively caring does not prevent an individual's care from being harmful. Allmark also criticized the theory for conflicting with the idea of treating everyone with unbiased consideration, which he considered necessary in certain situations.

Care ethics has been criticised for failing to protect the individual from paternalism, noting there is a risk of caregivers mistaking their needs for those of the people they care for. Individuals may need to cultivate the ability to distinguish their own needs from those that they care for, with Ruddick arguing for a need to respect the "embodied willfulness" of those who are cared for. Dana Ward stated, in an unpublished paper, that Kohlberg's scale is psychometrically sound.

== See also ==
- Altruism
- Ecofeminism
- Ethical relationship
- Feminist epistemology
- Feminist ethics
- Feminist justice ethics
- Ecomasculinity
- I and Thou
- Intersubjectivity
- Maternal-fetal conflict § Ethics of care and relational ethics

=== Theorists ===
- Annette Baier
- Sandra Bartky
- Joan Callahan
- Carol Gilligan
- Virginia Held
- Sarah Hoagland
- Eva Feder Kittay
- Christine Koggel
- Nel Noddings
- Tove Pettersen
- Sara Ruddick
- Mary Lyndon Shanley
- Michael Slote
- Joan Tronto
- Margaret Urban Walker
- Robin West
