= Ethics of care in contemporary art =

Ethics of care research field

The ethics of care in contemporary art is an emerging field of research that examines how the ethics of care shapes artistic practice, methodology and institutional culture, articulating feminist philosophy, collective practices, and political critique in contemporary art.

== Definition ==
Developed by feminist theorists since the 1980s, the ethics of care emphasises relationality, interdependence, and responsibility towards others as the foundations of moral life. In contemporary art, these principles are reformulated into creative, collective and material practices that shape how artworks are produced, disseminated, and received.

Intersectional, care-based artistic practices prioritise process over product and collective maintenance over individual authorship. They draw on feminist, intersectional, and ecological perspectives to offer modes of creation rooted in mutual support, vulnerability, and situated knowledge.

== History ==
=== Theoretical background ===
The ethics of care emerged within feminist philosophy as a critique of abstract and individualistic ethical models, arguing that ethical relationships are rooted in concrete contexts and power relations. Its application to contemporary art draws on three main theoretical sources.

Carol Gilligan, in A Different Voice (1982), establishes the fundamental distinction between an ethics of justice, based on individual rights and impartiality, and an ethics of care, based on relationships, responsibility, and empathy.

Joan C. Tronto (1993), drawing on previous work with Berenice Fisher, defines care as a political activity encompassing all the practices necessary to maintain, perpetuate and repair the world. She identifies with these three phrases: to care about (recognise a need), to take charge (assume responsibility), to care for (respond to the need) and to receive care (observe the response), to which she adds a fifth dimension of collective solidarity and citizenship (2013). These phases have been adopted by art theorists and practitioners to describe the relational dynamics of socially engaged artistic projects.

María Puig de la Bellacasa, in Matters of Care (2017), extends care theory beyond the human, situating it within ecological and more-than-human frameworks. She defines care as simultaneously work, affect, and ethics/politics. Her posthumanist and materialist perspective has influenced artistic practices concerned with environmental care, interspecies relationships, and the agency of non-human entities.

=== Pioneering artistic practices ===
One of the earliest and most influential artistic contributions to the ethics of care is the work of the American artist Mierle Laderman Ukeles. Her Manifesto for an Art of Maintenance — Proposal for an Exhibition “CARE”, 1969 (translated from the English Manifesto! MAINTENANCE ART– Proposal for an Exhibition "CARE", 1969) Ukeles challenges the art world's valorisation of creative "development"—novelty, progress, individual genius—at the expense of "maintenance"—preservation, repetition, repair. She argues that maintenance work, historically feminised and underpaid, is a vital and creative act deserving of recognition as art. Her work is recognised as having anticipated later feminist and ecological artistic practices, as well as the institutional shift toward care-based frameworks.

Ukeles' focus on care as an artistic subject is part of a broader tradition of feminist artistic practice that questioned the gendered division of labor and the devaluation of reproductive work.. Artists like Ana Mendieta and Fina Miralles explored the relationship between the body, care, and the environment through performance and land art. Later, collectives like Group Material engaged in community-based and politically situated artistic production, emphasising collaborative and relational working methods.

== See also ==
- Feminist art movement
- Mierle Laderman Ukeles
- Ecofeminism
- Community art
- Artist-run space
