= Moral Boundaries: A Political Argument for an Ethic of Care =

Book by Joan C. Tronto

Moral Boundaries: A Political Argument for an Ethic of Care by Joan C. Tronto is an American book published in 1993, contributing to the debate over the ethics of care through a feminist lens.
