= Jamie Lindemann Nelson =

American philosophy professor and bioethicist

Jamie Lindemann Nelson is a philosophy professor and bioethicist currently teaching at Michigan State University. Nelson earned her doctorate in philosophy at the State University of New York at Buffalo in 1980 and taught at the University of Tennessee at Knoxville and St. John's University before moving to Michigan State University. In addition, Nelson was an Associate for Ethical Studies at The Hastings Center from 1990–95 and is both a Woodrow Wilson Visiting Fellow and a Fellow of the Hastings Center. Nelson usually teaches courses on biomedical ethics, ethical theory, moral psychology, feminist theory, and philosophy of language.

== Contributions to philosophy ==
Nelson's work primarily focuses on biomedical ethics, ethical theory, moral psychology, feminist theory, applied philosophy, and philosophy of language. In addition to numerous publications, Nelson edited both Rationing Sanity: Ethical Issues in Managed Mental Health Care and Meaning and Medicine: A Reader in the Philosophy of Health Care with Hilde Lindemann Nelson. In addition, Nelson is the editor for the Rowman and Littlefield series entitled Explorations in Bioethics and the Medical Humanities, the co-editor, with Hilde Lindemann Nelson, for the Reflective Bioethics series published by Routledge, and the editor of the Journal of Clinical Ethics Special Section on Families and Bioethics.

== Professional publications ==
Nelson has published numerous peer-reviewed articles in journals such as The Journal of Bioethical Inquiry, Metaphilosophy, The Kennedy Institute of Ethics Journal, Journal of Clinical Ethics, Theoretical Medicine and Bioethics, The Hastings Center Report, and The Journal of Medicine and Philosophy.

Her books include Hippocrates' Maze: Ethical Explorations of the Medical Labyrinth, Alzheimer's: Answers to Hard Questions for Families, and The Patient in the Family. In addition, as remarked above, Nelson has also edited five collections including Rationing Sanity: Ethical Issues in Managed Mental Health Care, Meaning and Medicine: A Reader in the Philosophy of Health Care and the book series Explorations in Bioethics and the Medical Humanities.

== Awards and distinctions ==
In addition to being named a Hastings Center Fellow and a Woodrow Wilson Visiting Fellow, Nelson also received a National Endowment for the Humanities grant to conduct a Summer Seminar for College and University Teachers entitled "Bioethics in Particular". In addition, Nelson won an Outstanding Faculty Award from the Department of Philosophy at The University of Tennessee and the Senior Research and Creative Achievement Award from the College of Arts and Sciences. She was also awarded a Greenwall Foundation Grant for a research project on ethical issues in family caregiving for people suffering from progressive dementias and a Joint National Science Foundation/National Institutes of Health Grant for a research program on ethical issues in "exemplary" medical research".

== Selected works ==
=== Books ===
- Lindemann Nelson, Jamie; Lindemann Nelson, Hilde (1995). The patient in the family. New York: Routledge.
- Lindemann Nelson, Jamie; Lindemann Nelson, Hilde (1996). Alzheimer's: answers to hard questions for families. New York: Doubleday. ISBN 9780385485333.
- Lindemann Nelson, Jamie; Lindemann Nelson, Hilde (1999). Meaning and medicine: a reader in the philosophy of health care. New York: Routledge.
- Lindemann Nelson, Jamie (2003). Hippocrates' maze: ethical explorations of the medical labyrinth. Lanham, Maryland: Rowman and Littlefield.
- Lindemann Nelson, Jamie (2003). Rationing sanity: ethical issues in managed mental health care. Washington, DC: Georgetown University Press.

=== Chapters in books ===
- Lindemann Nelson, Jamie (2004), "The social situation of sincerity: Austen's Emma and Lovibond's Ethical Formation", in DesAutels, Peggy; Walker, Margaret Urban (eds.), Moral psychology: feminist ethics and social theory, Feminist Constructions, Lanham, Maryland: Rowman & Littlefield Publishers, pp. 83–98, ISBN 9780742534803.
- Lindemann Nelson, Jamie (2008), "Exporting childbirth", in DesAutels, Peggy; Whisnant, Rebecca (eds.), Global feminist ethics: feminist ethics and social theory, Feminist Constructions, Lanham, Maryland: Rowman & Littlefield, pp. 3–22, ISBN 9780742559103.

== See also ==
- American Philosophy
- American Philosophers
