= Shimer College Core Program =

The Shimer Great Books School Core Program is a curriculum sequence of 16 required courses in humanities, social sciences, natural sciences and interdisciplinary studies. "Basic Studies" courses are generally taken during the first two years, and "Advanced Studies" during the final two years. The "Advanced Integrative Studies" courses, numbered are taken in the final year.

In addition to required core classes, electives offer in-depth work in a particular subject, or basic skills instruction. Tutorials follow a similar protocol, but with only one or two students per course, and are similar in structure to the Oxford-Cambridge supervision system.

== Pedagogy ==
Small seminars are sole form of instruction. Classes are composed of no more than twelve students, and read and discuss only original source material.

Through a process Shimer internally calls "shared inquiry", "the text is the teacher, and thus the faculty member's role is to facilitate interaction between the text and the students",as well as between the students themselves. Readings are also organized by broad historical and philosophical themes, rather than conventional fields.

Faculty are always addressed by first name. Teachers "facilitate" discussion, and therefore may talk little during actual class-time. Often teachers provide historical and relational information not available from other students or the text itself.

=== Broadening "Great Books" ===
Shimer's current 200-book reading list remains largely faithful to the original Hutchins plan; however, new works are judiciously added to the core curriculum. These have included voices originally overlooked in the formation of the canon. Now included, for example, are works by Martin Luther King Jr., Carol Gilligan, Frantz Fanon, and Michel Foucault, along with other contemporary authors.

== Core concentrations ==
=== Humanities ===
The humanities core begins with the study of visual art and music, and progresses through literature, philosophy, and theology. The culminating course, "Critical Evaluation in the Humanities", attempts to approach all the areas of the Humanities through critical evaluation of significant works of the 18th century and later. This course includes Martin Buber's I and Thou, Immanuel Kant's Critique of Judgment, Friedrich Nietzsche's Beyond Good and Evil, and Søren Kierkegaard's Fear and Trembling.

=== Social sciences ===
The social sciences sequence opens with major works regarding the individual and society, and proceeds to classical political thought. Advanced courses investigate modern social and political theory, and conclude with the "Theories of Social Inquiry". This course focuses on interpretive methods in sociology, linguistic theory, and 20th century social thought, through works including Clifford Geertz's The Interpretation of Cultures, Paolo Freire's Pedagogy of the Oppressed, Michel Foucault's Discipline and Punish, and Karl Mannheim's Ideology and Utopia.

=== Natural sciences ===
The natural sciences course examines the historical course of modern theory, beginning with the presocratic philosophers of the 6th century BCE and progressing to the development of the theory of atoms. The second course traces the evolution of theories of evolution, genetics, and animal behavior. The development of models of infinitesimals, optics, and relativity are covered in the third course. The capstone course traces the study of quantum physics and modern molecular biology. The natural science reading list includes Albert Einstein's Relativity, Isaac Newton's Opticks, Richard Feynman's QED, Antoine Lavoisier's Elements of Chemistry, and Charles Darwin's Origin of Species.

=== Integrative studies ===
The first basic integrative studies course historically intended to develop fundamental skills in close reading and argumentation students required to further work with original source texts. The content of this course has been modified, and is fulfilled by fourth and fifth level courses, usually reserved for transfer students.

The second course, normally the first taken, the development of logic and mathematics are studied through readings in geometry and axiomatic systems from ancient and modern times.

The advanced integrative studies courses are the capstone courses of the Shimer curriculum. The readings are arranged chronologically in a unified, full-year sequence to demonstrate their historical relationships, beginning with the ancient epic poems The Epic of Gilgamesh and Homer's Iliad, and concluding with Johann Wolfgang von Goethe's Faust and Georg Wilhelm Friedrich Hegel's Reason in History. Students are encouraged to explore connections between assigned texts and those studied in other courses.

== Assessment and student production ==
Beyond assessment of performance in every class (often accounting for over 50% of a student's course grade), Shimer College requires and assesses the production of a number of significant projects throughout a student's undergraduate tenure.

=== Writing Week ===
Students not attempting their Comprehensive Examinations, or working on their Senior Thesis, are required to complete a "Semester Project" during the final week of each term (known as "Writing Week"). These projects focus on a topic chosen by students in conjunction with an advisor. These projects do not receive a grade, but are reviewed by the student's instructors, and must be approved before the student can register for the following semester.

=== Research paper ===
Students are required to complete a substantial original research paper, usually undertaken in the third-level Social Science course, before registering for advanced Integrative Studies courses.

=== Comprehensive examinations ===
Students must pass at least two comprehensive examinations to graduate. After completing the Basic Studies courses all students must pass the Basic Studies Comprehensive Examination to continue on to higher-level courses. After completing the Advanced Studies courses, students must pass at least one Area Studies Comprehensive Examination, usually in their area of concentration, in order to graduate.

Each comprehensive examination involves a week of exercises in reading and writing, as well as an oral component often taking the form of a Socratic seminar.

=== Undergraduate thesis ===
Every student must complete a Senior Thesis in order to graduate, primarily completed during the student's final year. Fulfillment usually takes the form of an analytical or expository essay, but may be a piece of original fiction, poetry, performance, or work of visual art. Students are encouraged to defend their theses orally and the public is invited to these defenses.

Their senior year, Shimer students who take the Graduate Record Exam (GRE) typically outscore three of four other potential graduate students and "consistently rank among the best in the nation in scores on the verbal and analytical portions of the test", with average analytic scores in the 91st percentile.

== Tabulation of Shimer's Core Curriculum ==
Level	Humanities	Social sciences	Natural sciences	Integrative studies
I	Art and Music	Society, Culture, and Personality	Laws and Models in Chemistry	Analysis, Logic, and Rhetoric (Previously Offered)
II	Poetry, Drama, and Fiction	The Western Political Tradition	Evolution and Animal Behavior	The Nature and Creation of Mathematics
Basic Studies Comprehensive Examination
III	Theology and Early Modern Philosophy	Modern Theories of State and Society	Light, Motion, and Scientific Explanation	
IV	Critical Evaluation in the Humanities	Methodology in the Social Sciences	Quantum Physics and Molecular Biology	
Area Studies Comprehensive Examination
V				History and Philosophy of Western Civilization: Ancient World – Middle Ages
VI				History and Philosophy of Western Civilization: Middles Ages – Nineteenth Century
Senior Thesis

== Sources ==
- Casement, William (1996). The Great Canon Controversy: The Battle of the Books in Higher Education. New Brunswick, New Jersey: Transaction Publishers. ISBN 1-55778-742-5.
- Kavaloski, Vincent C. (1979). "Interdisciplinary Education and Humanistic Aspiration: A Critical Reflection". In Kockelmans, Joseph J (ed.). Interdisciplinarity and Higher Education. University Park, Pennsylvania: Pennsylvania State University Press. pp. 224–243. ISBN 0-271-02326-0.
- "Shimer College Catalog 2009–2011". Shimer College. 2009.
