= Don Collins (disambiguation) =

Don Collins is an American former basketball player.

Don Collins may also refer to:

- Don Collins (baseball) (1952–2022), American baseball player
- Don Collins (bowls) (1927–2010), Australian lawn bowler
- Don Collins, alleged raper of Robbie Middleton who attempted to murder him by dousing petrol on him and setting him on fire

== See also ==
- Donald Collins (disambiguation)
- Don Collins Reed, American professor of ethics and history of philosophy
- Donal Collins (died 2010), priest and teacher accused of alleged sexual abuse of pupils in his charge
