= Nel Noddings =

American philosopher (1929–2022)

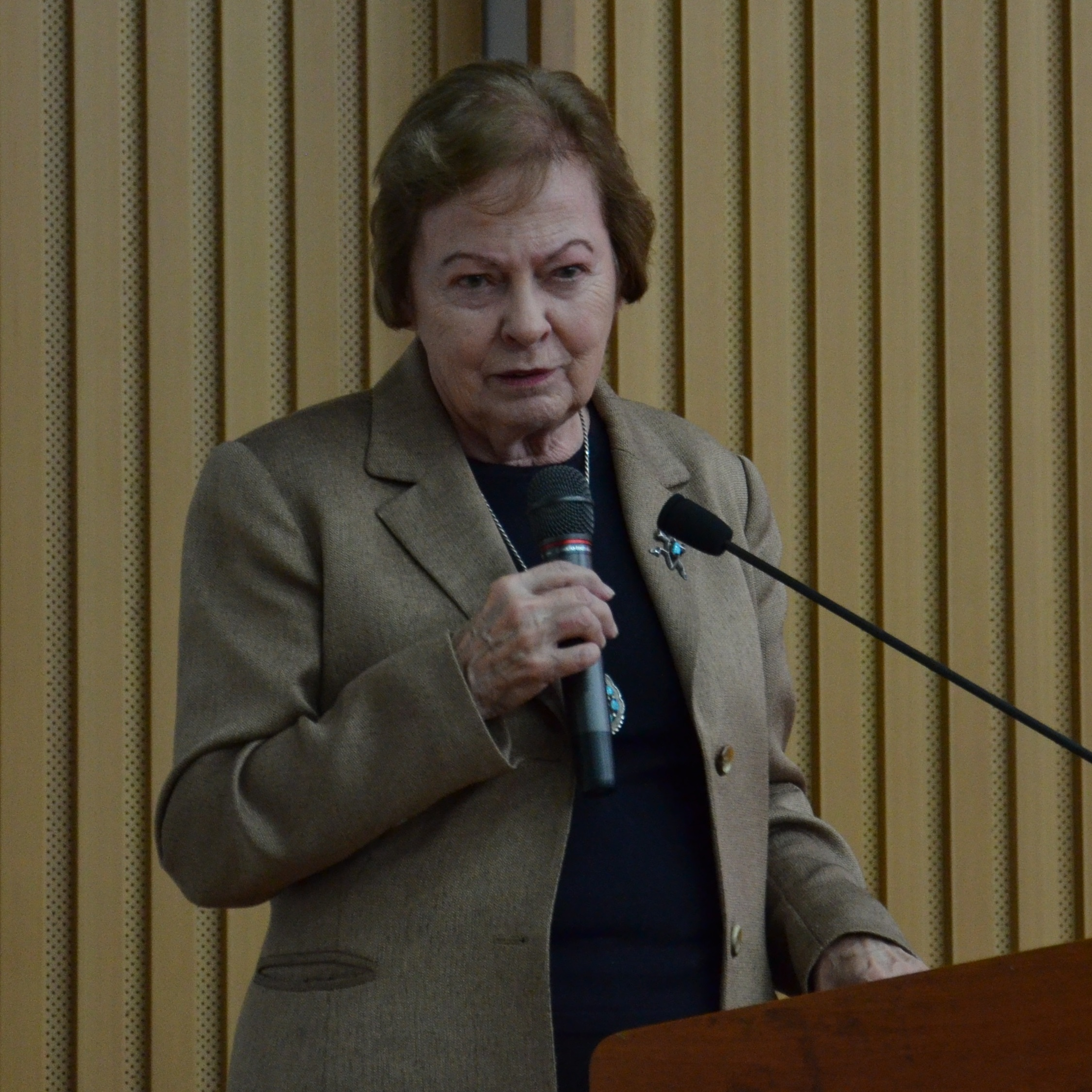
- Noddings lecturing in 2011
- Born: January 19, 1929; Irvington, New Jersey, U.S.
- Died: August 25, 2022 (aged 93); Key Largo, Florida, U.S.

Philosophical work
- Era: Contemporary philosophy
- Region: Western Philosophy
- School: Combines approaches from analytic and continental philosophy
- Main interests: Philosophy of education, ethics

Nel Noddings (/ˈnɑːdɪŋz/; January 19, 1929 – August 25, 2022) was an American feminist, educator, and philosopher best known for her work in philosophy of education, educational theory, and ethics of care.

Noddings is best known for her 1984 book Caring: A Feminine Approach to Ethics and Moral Education, which established her relational approach to ethics. Noddings argued that caring is a more fundamental basis for ethics than justice-based approaches. Her framework centers on the relationship between the one-caring and the cared-for, and distinguishes between natural caring and ethical caring.

Her ethical framework had significant implications for education, where she argued that the teacher-student relationship should be understood as a caring relationship. She advocated for educating the whole child, with happiness as a central aim of education, and called for schools to function as an institution capable of addressing students' overwhelming needs.

== Biography ==
Noddings received a bachelor's degree in mathematics and physical science from Montclair State University in New Jersey, a master's degree in mathematics from Rutgers University, and a PhD in education from the Stanford University Graduate School of Education.

Nel Noddings worked in many areas of the education system. She spent seventeen years as an elementary and high school mathematics teacher and school administrator, before earning her PhD and beginning work as an academic in the fields of philosophy of education, theory of education and ethics, specifically moral education and ethics of care. She became a member of the Stanford faculty in 1977, and was the Jacks Professor of Child Education from 1992 until 1998. While at Stanford University she received awards for teaching excellence in 1981, 1982 and 1997, and was the associate dean or acting dean of the School of Education for four years. After leaving Stanford University, she held positions at Columbia University and Colgate University. She served as president of the Philosophy of Education Society and the John Dewey Society. In 2002–2003 she held the John W. Porter Chair in Urban Education at Eastern Michigan University. She was Lee L. Jacks Professor of Education, emerita, at Stanford University from 1998.

Before Nel was a faculty member at Stanford she served as the director of the laboratory school at the University of Chicago, which was founded by fellow philosopher John Dewey.

Nel Noddings has 10 children( 5 biological, 5 adopted), 39 grandchildren, and over 20 great-grandchildren, many of whom are highly educated and educators themselves. In 2012 she lost her husband of over 60 years to cancer.

Noddings's fruitful career was matched by an equally fruitful domestic life. According to infed.org, Noddings described herself as "'incurably domestic' not only because she and her husband raised ten children, but because she also appreciated 'order in the kitchen, a fresh tablecloth, flowers on the table and food waiting for guests'. She added, 'I like having pets and kids around'. Feminists, she commented, sometimes find it hard to admit such things matter to them."

She had described her early educational experiences and her close relationships as key in her development of her philosophical position. Early relationships with caring teachers inspired her passion for her later work.

=== Personality ===
Colleague Michael Katz described Noddings as "one of the most efficient people" he knows, a "consummate teacher–scholar," who lives according to the "do it now" philosophy and "never lets her status as a famous scholar and lecturer and author interfere with treating everyone with the same kindness, thoughtfulness, and consideration that she would expect people to show her, regardless of her status or position."

== Work ==
=== Contributions to philosophy ===
Noddings's first sole-authored book Caring: A Feminine Approach to Ethics and Moral Education (1984) followed close on the 1982 publication of Carol Gilligan's ground-breaking work in the ethics of care In a Different Voice. While her work on ethics continued, with the publication of Women and Evil (1989), and later works on moral education, most of her later publications have been on the philosophy of education and educational theory. Her most significant works in these areas have been Educating for Intelligent Belief or Unbelief (1993) and Philosophy of Education (1995).

Besides contributing to philosophy, Noddings also worked in the field of social psychology. Noddings was on the editorial board of Greater Good Magazine, published by the Greater Good Science Center of the University of California, Berkeley. Noddings's contributions include the interpretation of scientific research into the roots of compassion, altruism, and peaceful human relationships.

==== Nel Noddings's relational ethics ====
Nel Noddings's approach to ethics of care has been described as relational ethics because it prioritizes concern for relationships. Like Carol Gilligan, Noddings accepts that justice based approaches, which are supposed to be more masculine, are genuine alternatives to ethics of care. However, unlike Gilligan, Noddings's believes that caring, 'rooted in receptivity, relatedness, and responsiveness' is a more basic and preferable approach to ethics (Caring 1984, 2).

===== Caring: A Feminine Approach to Ethics and Moral Education =====
The key to understanding Noddings's ethics of care is to understand her notion of caring and ethical caring in particular.

Noddings believes that it would be a mistake to try to provide a systematic examination of the requirements for caring; nevertheless, she does suggest three requirements for caring (Caring 1984, 11–12). She argues that the carer (one-caring) must exhibit engrossment and motivational displacement, and the person who is cared for (cared-for) must respond in some way to the caring (1984, 69). Noddings's term engrossment refers to thinking about someone in order to gain a greater understanding of him or her. Engrossment is necessary for caring because an individual's personal and physical situation must be understood before the one-caring can determine the appropriateness of any action. 'Engrossment' need not entail, as the term seems to suggest, a deep fixation on the other. It requires only the attention needed to come to understand the position of the other. Engrossment could not on its own constitute caring; someone could have a deep understanding of another person, yet act against that person's interests. Motivational displacement prevents this from occurring. Motivational displacement occurs when the one-caring's behaviour is largely determined by the needs of the person for whom she is caring. On its own, motivational displacement would also be insufficient for ethical caring. For example, someone who acted primarily from a desire to accomplish something for another person, but failed to think carefully enough about that other person's needs (failed to be correctly engrossed in the other), would fail to care. Finally, Noddings believes that caring requires some form of recognition from the cared-for that the one-caring is, in fact, caring. When there is a recognition of and response to the caring by the person cared for, Noddings describes the caring as "completed in the other" (1984, 4).

Nel Noddings draws an important distinction between natural caring and ethical caring (1984, 81–83). Noddings distinguishes between acting because "I want" and acting because "I must". When I care for someone because "I want" to care, say I hug a friend who needs hugging in an act of love, Noddings claims that I am engaged in natural caring. When I care for someone because "I must" care, say I hug an acquaintance who needs hugging in spite of my desire to escape that person's pain, according to Noddings, I am engaged in ethical caring. Ethical caring occurs when a person acts caringly out of a belief that caring is the appropriate way of relating to people. When someone acts in a caring way because that person naturally cares for another, the caring is not ethical caring (1984, 79–80). Noddings claims that ethical caring is based on, and so dependent on, natural caring (1984, 83, 206 fn 4). It is through experiencing others caring for them and naturally caring for others that people build what is called an "ethical ideal", an image of the kind of person they want to be.

Noddings describes wrong actions in terms of "a diminishment of the ethical ideal" and "evil". A person's ethical ideal is diminished when she either chooses or is forced to act in a way that rejects her internal call to care. In effect, her image of the best person it is possible for her to be is altered in a way that lowers her ideal. According to Noddings, people and organizations can deliberately or carelessly contribute to the diminishment of others' ethical ideals. They may do this by teaching people not to care, or by placing them in conditions that prevent them from being able to care (1984, 116–119). A person is evil if, in spite of her ability to do otherwise, she either fails to personally care for someone, or prevents others from caring. Noddings writes, "[when] one intentionally rejects the impulse to care and deliberately turns her back on the ethical, she is evil, and this evil cannot be redeemed" (1984, 115).

This is referred to as "obligation". "There are moments for all of us when we care quite naturally. We just do care; no ethical effort is required. 'Want' and 'ought' are indistinguishable in such cases." I have the ability to "abstain from action if I believe that anything I might do would tend to work against the best interests of the cared-for." According to Noddings we are obligated to pursue the "musts".

=== Criticisms of Noddings's relational ethics ===
Nel Noddings's ethics of care has been criticised by both feminists and those who favour more traditional, and allegedly masculine, approaches to ethics. In brief, feminists object that the one caring is, in effect, carrying out the traditional female role in life of giving while receiving little in return. Those who accept more traditional approaches to ethics argue that the partiality shown to those closest to us in Noddings's theory is inappropriate.

Noddings tends to use unequal relationships as a model for understanding caring. Philosopher and feminist Sarah Lucia Hoagland argues that the relationships in question, such as parenting and teaching, are ideally relationships where caring is a transitory thing designed to foster the independence of the cared-for, and so end the unequal caring relationship. Unequal relationships, she writes, are ethically problematic, and so a poor model for an ethical theory. Hoagland argues that on Noddings's account of ethical caring, the one-caring is placed in the role of the giver and the cared-for in the role of the taker. The one-caring is dominant, choosing what is good for the cared-for, but gives without receiving caring in return. The cared-for is put in the position of being a dependent, with insufficient control over the nature of the caring. Hoagland believes that such unequal relationships cannot be morally good.

== Contributions to education ==
=== Philosophy of Education ===
Nodding's approach to education is rooted in her ethics of care and draws significantly on the thought of John Dewey. Like Dewey, she argued that intelligence develops socially and that all school subjects should be taught as contributions to social life. At the same time, she identified limitations in Dewey's view of moral education arguing that he has more to say about the ethical conduct of education about its ethical outcome. Noddings argued that critical thinking should not be treated as an abstract intellectual exercise, but should be grounded in caring relationships and directed toward improving human life and democratic participants. Noddings believed that students learn to care by first experiencing care from others, and through those relationships develop the ability to care about wider social issues.

=== Ethic of care in education ===
In education, the ethic of care speaks of obligation to do something right and a sense that we must do something right when others address us. The "I must" response is induced in direct encounter in preparation for response. We respond because we want to; either we love and respect those that address us or we have significant regard for them. As a result, the recipients of care must respond in a way that demonstrates their caring has been received.

In regards to education, caring refers to the relationship between student and teacher, not just the person who cares. As educators respond to the needs of students, teachers may see the need to design a differentiated curriculum because as they work closely with students, they will be moved by students' different needs and interests. The claim to care must not be based on a one-time virtuous decision but an ongoing interest in the student's welfare.

=== Needs in the ethic of care model ===
==== Distinction ====
In "Identifying Needs in Education" Noddings (2003) provides criteria for deciding whether a want should be recognized or treated as a need. The criteria are as follows:

- The want is fairly stable over a considerable period of time and/or it is intense.
- The want is demonstrably connected to some desirable end or, at least, to one that is not harmful; further, the end is impossible or difficult to reach without the object wanted.
- The want is in the power (within the means) of those addressed to grant it.
- The person wanting is willing and able to contribute to the satisfaction of the want.

==== Inferred needs ====
The overt or explicit curriculum in education is designed to meet the inferred needs of students, as they are those identified by teachers or individuals to improve the classroom learning environment. In the ethics of care philosophy, inferred needs are referred to as those that come from those not directly expressing the need. Most needs identified by educators for learners are inferred needs because they are not being identified by the learners themselves. Students' inferred needs can often be identified interactively, through working with them one on one or observing their behaviour in a classroom environment.

==== Expressed needs ====
Expressed needs are difficult to assess and address in the classroom environment, as they are needs directly expressed by learners through behaviour or words. Although expressed needs are difficult to address, educators need to treat them positively in order to maintain a caring relationship with learners. If expressed needs are not treated carefully, the individual might not feel cared for. Educators should make a consistent effort to respond to a student's expressed needs through prior planning and discussions of moral and social issues surrounding the needs.

==== Basic (universal) needs ====
Basic needs are defined as the most basic needs required to survive such as food, water and shelter. Basic needs and needs associated with self-actualization (overwhelming needs) co-exist when basic needs are being compromised over extended periods of time.

==== Overwhelming needs ====
Overwhelming needs cannot be met by the usual processes of schooling and include extreme instances such as abuse, neglect and illness. As well, a student's socioeconomic status (SES) or dysfunctional family environment can cause them to come to school with needs that cannot be expressed nor met by educators. To help meet those overwhelming needs of students, particularly those in poor neighborhood, the ethic of care philosophy dictates that schools should be full-service institutions. Medical and dental care, social services, childcare and parenting advice should be available on campus. In turn, students in these situations are often forced into academic courses and fight an uphill battle, where they have to engage in activities that are difficult to focus on, based on their circumstances.

==== Implications for education ====
The poor or homeless without transportation cannot afford to seek such services. Despite the needs students face, we force children into academics and try to motivate them to do things they don’t want to.

=== Emotion and professionalism in teacher education ===
Emotion has been aggravated by the rise of professions with their insistence on detachment, distance, cool appraisal and systematic procedures. Concern for rational and professional functioning keeps emotion out of education, as it is supposed that real professionals do not allow themselves to feel controlled by their emotions and are forced to face problems with dispassionate rationality. Noddings states that in the teaching profession, the concern takes several forms:

- Fear that professional judgment will be impaired by emotions
- Professionals must learn to protect themselves against the burnout that may result from feeling too much for one's students
- It has become a mark of professionalism to be detached, cool and dispassionate

The use of stories in teacher education could be powerful in dispelling these beliefs, as they illustrate how deeply experienced teachers feel about the inevitable difficulties that occur in the classroom.

=== Educating the whole child ===
In the ethic of care model, the aim of education is centered around happiness. Incorporating this component into education involves not only helping our students understand the components of happiness by allowing teachers and students to interact as a whole community. In regard to the education of the whole child, Noddings (2005) stated that, "We will not find the solution to problems of violence, alienation, ignorance, and unhappiness in increasing our security, imposing more tests, punishing schools for their failure to produce 100 percent proficiency, or demanding that teachers be knowledgeable in the subjects they teach. Instead, we must allow teachers and students to interact as whole persons, and we must develop policies that treat the school as a whole community."

=== Criticisms of the ethic of Care in education ===
One criticism of Noddings's ethic of care, in regards to education, is that it advocates little importance to caring for oneself, except as a means to provide further care for others. In regards to education, the teacher–student relationship could be jeopardized because the educator might not engage in self-care, and instead devote all their energy into meeting their students' needs. Hoaglard states that the caregiver would be defined as a "martyr, servant or slave" by the philosophy in the ethic of care.

Another criticism of Noddings's argument is that ethic of care may result not only in the exploitation of the caregiver, but also in a smothering paternalism. Goodin writes that, "the trouble with subsuming individuals into relationships of 'we'ness is precisely that we then risk losing track of the separateness of people". As well, Goodin states that Noddings's criteria for implicit and explicit needs assumes that needs are transparent to the caregiver and that the caregiver's perceptions are privileged in the process of interpreting needs. Lastly, Grimshaw explains that it is important to consider that good care always entails an element of distance between individuals. She states, "Care and understanding require the sort of distance that is needed in order not to see the other as a projection of the self, or self as a continuation of other". Thus, a clear distance between the self and the individual that is being cared for needs to exist in order to keep the personal care of both individuals in mind.

== Selected works ==
- Awakening the Inner Eye: Intuition in Education (co-author with Paul J. Shore). New York: Teachers College Columbia University, 1984.
- Caring: A Feminine Approach to Ethics and Moral Education. Berkeley: University of California Press, 1984. Publisher's promotion
- Women and Evil. Berkeley: University of California Press, 1989. Publisher's promotion
- Constructivist Views on the Teaching and Learning of Mathematics (co-author with Robert B. Davis and Carolyn Alexander Maher). Journal for Research in Mathematics Education, Monograph no. 4, Reston, Va.: National Council of Teachers of Mathematics, 1990.
- Stories Lives Tell: Narrative and Dialogue in Education (co-author with Carol Witherell). New York: Teachers College Press, 1991.
- The Challenge to Care in Schools: An Alternative Approach to Education. Advances in Contemporary Educational Thought series, vol. 8. New York: Teachers College Press, 1992.
- Educating for Intelligent Belief or Unbelief. The John Dewey Lecture. New York: Teachers College Press, 1993.
- Philosophy of Education. Dimensions of Philosophy series. Boulder, Colorado: Westview Press, 1995.
- Caregiving: Readings in Knowledge, Practice, Ethics, and Politics (co-edited with Suzanne Gordon, Patricia E. Benner). Studies in Health, Illness, and Caregiving in America. Philadelphia: University of Pennsylvania Press, 1996.
- Awakening the Inner Eye: Intuition in Education (co-author with Paul J. Shore). Troy, NY: Educator's International Press, 1998.
- Justice and Caring: The Search for Common Ground in Education (co-author with Michael S. Katz and Kenneth A. Strike). Professional Ethics in Education series. New York: Teachers College Press, 1999. Publisher's promotion
- Uncertain Lives: Children of Promise, Teachers of Hope (co-author with Robert V. Bullough). New York: Teachers College Press, 2001.
- Educating Moral People. New York: Teachers College Press, 2002.
- Starting at Home: Caring and Social Policy. Berkeley: University of California Press, 2002. Publisher's promotion Review
- Happiness and Education. Cambridge: Cambridge University Press, 2003. Publisher's promotion
- Critical Issues in Education: Dialogues and Dialectics (Co-author with Jack L. Nelson, Stuart B. Palonsky, and Mary Rose McCarthy). 2003
- No Education Without Relation (Co-author with Charles Bingham, and Alexander M. Sidorkin). Counterpoints: Studies in the Postmodern Theory of Education, 259. Peter Lang Publishing, 2004. Publisher's promotion
- Educating Citizens for Global Awareness (editor). New York: Teachers College Press, 2005. Boston Research Center for the 21st Century Publisher's promotion
- Critical Lessons: What Our Schools Should Teach. Cambridge: Cambridge University Press, 2006. Publisher's promotion
- Moral Matters: Five Ways to Develop the Moral Life of Schools (co-author with Barbara Senkowski Stengel, and R. Tom Alan). New York: Teachers College Press, 2006.
- Education and Democracy in the 21st Century. Teachers College Press, 2013.
- A Richer, Brighter Vision for American High Schools. Cambridge: Cambridge University Press, 2015.
- The Maternal Factor: Two Paths to Morality. University of California Press, 2010
- Teaching Controversial Issues: The Case for Critical Thinking and Moral Commitment in the Classroom (co-author with Laurie Brooks). Teacher College Press 2016
- Palgrave International Handbook of Alternative Education (co-editor with Helen E. Lees). Palgrave Macmillan UK 2016.
- When School Reform Goes Wrong. New York: Teachers College Press, 2007.
- Peace Education: How We Come to Love and Hate War. : Cambridge University Press, 2011.
- Multiyear Teaching: The Case for Continuity (co-author with David J. Flinders, 2001)
