= Sandra Bartky =

American philosopher (1935–2016)

- Born: Sandra Lee Schwartz; May 5, 1935; Chicago, Illinois, U.S.
- Died: October 17, 2016 (aged 81); Saugatuck, Michigan, U.S.

Education
- Education: University of Illinois Urbana-Champaign (BA, MA, PhD)

Philosophical work
- Institutions: University of Illinois at Chicago

Sandra Lee Bartky (née Schwartz; May 5, 1935 – October 17, 2016) was a professor of philosophy and gender studies at the University of Illinois at Chicago. Her main research areas were feminism and phenomenology. Her notable contributions to the field of feminist philosophy include the article, "Toward a Phenomenology of Feminist Consciousness". Sandra Lee Bartky died on October 17, 2016, at her home in Saugatuck, Michigan at age 81.

== Education ==
Bartky held a BA, MA and PhD from the University of Illinois Urbana-Champaign, and studied at the University of Bonn, the Ludwig-Maximilians-Universität München, and the University of California, Los Angeles (UCLA). In 1997, she received an honorary degree, Doctor of Humanities, from New England College.

== Career ==
In 1963, Bartky joined the faculty of the University of Illinois at Chicago (UIC) as an instructor in philosophy. She was promoted to assistant professor in 1964, associate professor in 1970, and full professor in 1990. She retired in December 2003 and became professor emerita.

She was a founding member of UIC’s philosophy department and a key contributor in the planning of UIC’s first courses on women and women’s issues.

In the mid-70s, she helped to found the Gender & Women’s Studies program at UIC (originally Women’s Studies) and played a key role in bringing feminist philosophical inquiry into that department.

She was also a founder of the Society for Women in Philosophy (SWIP) and Hypatia, a philosophy and feminist studies journal.

Her main areas of interest included existential philosophy, phenomenology, critical theory, Heidegger, Marxism, postmodernism and feminist theory.

=== Foucault, Femininity, and the Modernization of Patriarchal Power ===
Feminist Sandra Lee Bartky wrote an article, "Foucault, Femininity, and the Modernization of Patriarchal Power" in 1988, detailing societally accepted "norms" for a woman's body and behavior and makes the point that women are often judged for their size and shape because their bodies reflect their personality and nature. Using this information, she explains her idea that the "ideal body of femininity is constructed" and states that this perfect woman reflects the cultural obsessions and preoccupations of that society.

Bartky explains that the body of the ideal female varies with time and is dependent on culture. In today's society, the ideal body is one that is "taut, small-breasted, narrow-hipped, and of a slimness bordering on emaciation" or that of a newly pubescent girl. This look of fragility and lack of muscular strength allows women to have an image of powerlessness, obedience, and subservience to men. They are expected to follow a strict diet, monitor their hunger to maintain their size and shape, exercise to "build the breasts and banish cellulite" and "spot-reduce problem areas" such as thick ankles or thighs. Along with body image, women are also expected to participate in behaviors that allow them to maintain this image. Women are expected to always have soft, supple, hairless, and smooth skin, worry about their beauty, be hesitant to extend their body, have a graceful gait and a restricted posture, always avert their eyes, and appear small with hands folded and legs pressed together when they are sitting. "Under the current 'tyranny of slenderness' women are forbidden to become large or massive; they must take up as little space as possible."

Using all these rules, Bartky argues that "femininity is something in which virtually every woman is required to participate" and if women don't follow this strict methodology and violate these norms, they become "loose women." She states that because the difference between men and women is not at all just sexual difference, femininity is constructed and by doing that society created a "practiced and subjected body on which an inferior status has been inscribed." All these rules for the ideal feminine body reflect society's obsession with keeping women in check so that men can appear more powerful. Bartky concludes that "The ... project of femininity is a "setup": it requires such radical and extensive measures of bodily transformation that virtually every woman who gives herself to it is destined in some degree to fail."

=== Feminist Involvement ===
In 1977, Bartky became an associate of the Women's Institute for Freedom of the Press (WIFP). WIFP is an American nonprofit publishing organization. The organization works to increase communication between women and connect the public with forms of women-based media.

== Published works ==
=== Books ===
- Bartky, Sandra Lee (1990). Femininity and Domination: Studies in the Phenomenology of Oppression. New York: Routledge. ISBN 9780415901864.
- Bartky, Sandra Lee; Fraser, Nancy (1992). Revaluing French Feminism: Critical Essays on Difference, Agency, and Culture. Bloomington: Indiana University Press. ISBN 9780253206824.
- Bartky, Sandra Lee (2002). Sympathy and Solidarity: and Other Essays. Lanham, Maryland: Rowman & Littlefield. ISBN 9780847697793.

=== Chapters in books ===
- Bartky, Sandra Lee (2004), "Intimidation", in DesAutels, Peggy; Walker, Margaret Urban (eds.), Moral psychology: feminist ethics and social theory, Feminist Constructions, Lanham, Maryland: Rowman & Littlefield Publishers, ISBN 9780742534803.
- Bartky, Sandra Lee (2005), "On psychological oppression", in Cudd, Ann E.; Andreasen, Robin O. (eds.), Feminist theory: a philosophical anthology, Oxford, UK Malden, Massachusetts: Blackwell Publishing, pp. 105–114, ISBN 9781405116619.
- Bartky, Sandra Lee (2005), "Battered women, intimidation, and the law", in Friedman, Marilyn (ed.), Women and citizenship, Studies in Feminist Philosophy, Oxford New York: Oxford University Press, pp. 52–66, ISBN 9780195175356.
- Bartky, Sandra Lee (2009) [1997], "Fractured friendships", in Liinason, Mia; et al. (eds.), Friendship in feminist conversation: essays for Ulla M. Holm, Göteborg: Göteborgs universitet Distribution, Acta Universitatis Gothenburgensis, ISBN 9789173466721.

=== Journal articles ===
- Bartky, Sandra Lee (Fall 1975). "Toward a phenomenology of feminist consciousness". Social Theory and Practice. 3 (4). Florida State University Department of Philosophy: 425–439. doi:10.5840/soctheorpract1975349. JSTOR 23557163.
