= Joan Tronto =

American political scientist

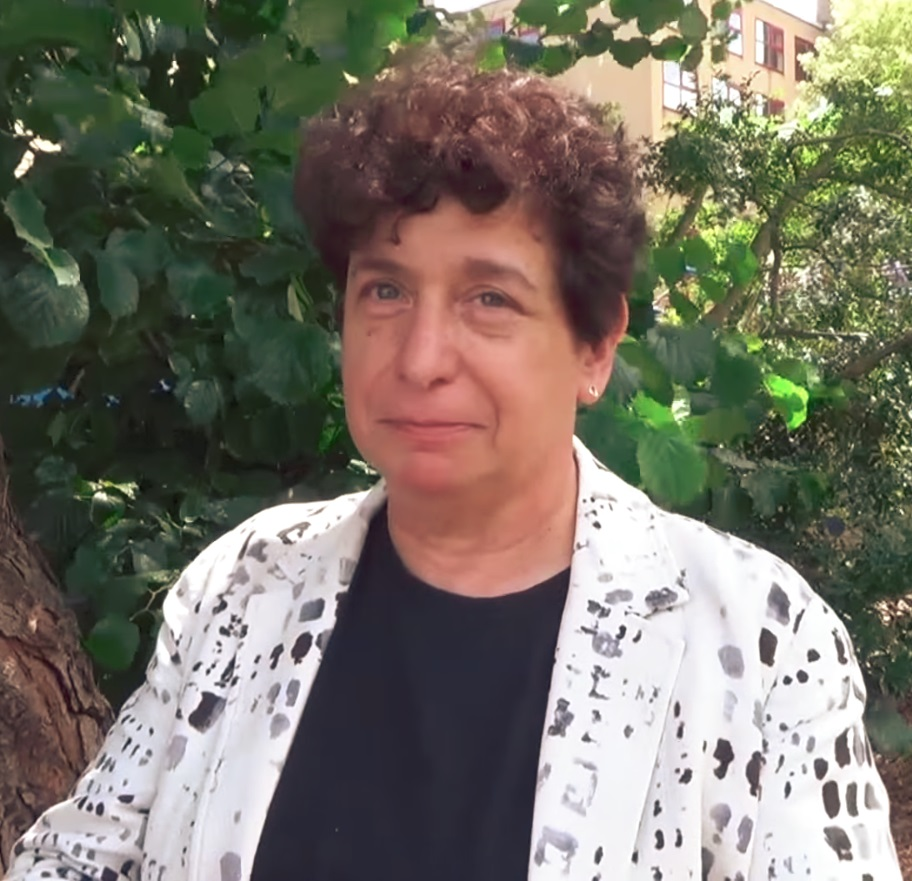
- Tronto in 2015
- Born: Joan Claire Tronto; June 29, 1952 (age 74)
- Education: Princeton University
- Known for: Ethics of care
- Scientific career
- Fields: Political science
- Workplaces: University of Minnesota
- Thesis: Is political rationality possible? A critique of political control in the work of Hobbes, Smith, and Weber (1981)

Joan Claire Tronto (born June 29, 1952) is an American political scientist who is Professor of Political Science at the University of Minnesota. She was previously Professor of Women's Studies and Political Science at Hunter College and the Graduate School, City University of New York. Before that she was Assistant Professor of Government and Legal Studies at Bowdoin College.

== Education ==
Tronto gained her degree from Oberlin College in 1974. She passed both her masters and her Ph.D at Princeton University in 1976 and 1981 respectively.

== Research ==
Tronto's research fields range from political theories, gender and the ethics of care, to political thought.

== Works ==
=== Books ===
- Tronto, Joan C.; Cohen, Cathy J.; Jones, Kathleen B. (1997). Women transforming politics: an alternative reader. New York: New York University Press. ISBN 9780814715581.
- Tronto, Joan (2012). Le risque ou le "care" (in French). Paris: Presses universitaires de France (PUF). ISBN 9782130607199. (Fabienne Brugère, translator)
- Tronto, Joan C. (2013). Caring democracy: markets, equality, and justice. New York: New York University Press. ISBN 9780814770344.
- Tronto, Joan; Hochschild, Arlie; Gilligan, Carol (2013). Contre l'indifférence des privilégiés: à quoi sert le care (in French). Paris: Payot. ISBN 9782228908771. Details.

=== Chapters in books ===
- Tronto, Joan (1989), "Women and caring: or, what can feminists learn from caring?", in Jaggar, Alison M.; Bordo, Susan R. (eds.), Gender/body/knowledge: feminist reconstructions of being and knowing, New Brunswick, New Jersey: Rutgers University Press, pp. 172–187, ISBN 9780813513799.
- Tronto, Joan; Fisher, Berenice (1990), "Toward a feminist theory of caring", in Abel, Emily K.; Nelson, Margaret K. (eds.), Circles of care: work and identity in women's lives, Albany, New York: State University of New York Press, pp. 36–54, ISBN 9780791402641.
- Tronto, Joan (1999), "Age segregated housing as a moral problem: an exercise in rethinking ethics", in Walker, Margaret Urban (ed.), Mother time: women, aging, and ethics, Lanham, Maryland: Rowman & Littlefield Publishers, pp. 261–277, ISBN 9780847692613.
- Tronto, Joan (2001), "Does managing professionals affect professional ethics? Competence, autonomy, and care", in DesAutels, Peggy; Waugh, Joanne (eds.), Feminists doing ethics, Lanham, Maryland: Rowman & Littlefield Publishers, pp. 187–202, ISBN 9780742512115.
- Tronto, Joan (2005), "Care as the work of citizens: a modest proposal", in Friedman, Marilyn (ed.), Women and citizenship, Studies in Feminist Philosophy, Oxford New York: Oxford University Press, pp. 130–145, ISBN 9780195175356.
- Tronto, Joan C. (2005), "An ethic of care", in Cudd, Ann E.; Andreasen, Robin O. (eds.), Feminist theory: a philosophical anthology, Oxford, UK Malden, Massachusetts: Blackwell Publishing, pp. 251–263, ISBN 9781405116619.
- Tronto, Joan (2008), "Is peace keeping care work? A feminist reflection on "the responsibility to protect"", in DesAutels, Peggy; Whisnant, Rebecca (eds.), Global feminist ethics: feminist ethics and social theory, Feminist Constructions, Lanham, Maryland: Rowman & Littlefield, pp. 179–200, ISBN 9780742559103.
- Tronto, Joan (2009), "Consent as a grant of authority: a care ethics reading of informed consent", in Lindemann, Hilde; Verkerk, Marian; Walker, Margaret Urban (eds.), Naturalized bioethics: toward responsible knowing and practice, Cambridge New York: Cambridge University Press, pp. 182–198, ISBN 9780521719407.
- Tronto, Joan (2011), "Privatizing neo-colonialism: migrant domestic care workers, partial citizenship and responsibility", in Dahl, Hanne Marlene; Keränen, Marja; Kovalainen, Anne (eds.), Europeanization, care and gender: global complexities, Houndmills, Basingstoke, Hampshire New York: Palgrave Macmillan, pp. 165–181, ISBN 9780230299696.
- Tronto, Joan C. (2011), "A feminist democratic ethics of care and global care workers: citizenship and responsibility", in Mahon, Rianne; Robinson, Fiona (eds.), Feminist ethics and social policy: towards a new global political economy of care, Vancouver: UBC Press, pp. 162–177, ISBN 9780774821087.
- Tronto, Joan C. (2014), "Democratic care politics in an age of limits", in Razavi, Shahra; Staab, Silke (eds.), Global variations in the political and social economy of care: worlds apart, New York/London: Routledge / UNRISD Research in Gender and Development, pp. 29–40, ISBN 9780415754552.

=== Journal articles ===
- Tronto, Joan C. (August 1984). "Law and modernity: the significance of Max Weber's sociology of law". Texas Law Review. 63. The Texas Law Review Association: 565–577. Archived from the original on 2015-11-28.
- Tronto, Joan C. (Summer 1987). "Beyond gender difference to a theory of care". Signs. 12 (4): 644–663. doi:10.1086/494360. JSTOR 3174207. S2CID 145052554.
- Tronto, Joan C. (October 1987). "Political science and caring: or, the perils of balkanized social science". Women & Politics. 7 (3): 85–97. doi:10.1080/1554477x.1987.9970496.
- Tronto, Joan C. (Spring 1991). "Review: changing goals and changing strategies: varieties of women's political activities". Feminist Studies. 17 (1): 85–104. doi:10.2307/3178172. hdl:2027/spo.0499697.0017.108. JSTOR 3178172.
- Tronto, Joan C. (May 1995). "Caring as the basis for radical political judgments". Hypatia. 10 (2): 141–149. doi:10.1111/j.1527-2001.1995.tb01376.x. JSTOR 3810286. S2CID 146571664.
- Tronto, Joan C. (August 2003). "Time's place". Feminist Theory. 4 (2): 119–138. doi:10.1177/14647001030042002. S2CID 144329911.
- Tronto, Joan (December 2004). "Frantz Fanon" (PDF). Contemporary Political Theory. 3 (3): 245–252. doi:10.1057/palgrave.cpt.9300182. S2CID 195282851.
- Tronto, Joan C.; Leonard, Stephen T. (February 2007). "The genders of citizenship". American Political Science Review. 101 (1): 33–46. doi:10.1017/S0003055407070207. S2CID 145297986.
- Tronto, Joan (April 2010). "'The servant problem' and justice in households". Iris: European Journal of Philosophy and Public Debate. 2 (3). Firenze University Press: 67–85.
- Tronto, Joan C. (July 2010). "Creating caring institutions: politics, plurality, and purpose". Ethics and Social Welfare. 4 (2): 158–171. doi:10.1080/17496535.2010.484259. S2CID 143086732.
- Tronto, Joan C. (September 2012). "Partiality based on relational responsibilities: another approach to global ethics". Ethics and Social Welfare. 6 (3): 303–316. doi:10.1080/17496535.2012.704058. S2CID 143230526.
- Tronto, Joan C.; van Nistelrooij, Inge; Schaafsma, Petruschka (November 2014). "Ricoeur and the ethics of care". Medicine, Health Care and Philosophy. 17 (4): 485–491. doi:10.1007/s11019-014-9595-4. PMID 25273330.
