= Virginia Held =

American feminist philosopher (1929–2026)

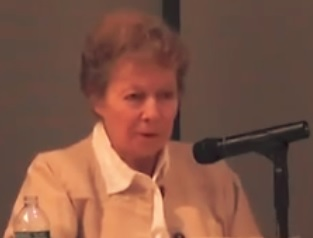
- Held in 2013
- Born: Virginia Potter Held; October 28, 1929; Mendham, New Jersey, U.S.
- Died: May 26, 2026 (aged 96)

Philosophical work
- Institutions: Columbia University, Hunter College, CUNY Graduate Center
- Main interests: Ethics of care, feminist ethics, morality of political violence

Virginia Potter Held (October 28, 1929 – May 26, 2026) was an American moral, social, political and feminist philosopher whose work on the ethics of care sparked significant research into the ethical dimensions of providing care for others and critiques of the traditional roles of women in society.

== Education and career ==
Held received her B.A. from Barnard College and her Ph.D. in philosophy from Columbia University in 1968 before working at Hunter College as lecturer (1965–69), assistant professor (1969–72), associate professor (1973–77), and full professor from 1977 until her retirement in 2001. Held was affiliated with the CUNY Graduate Center in 1973, and served as deputy executive officer of the Philosophy program at the CUNY Graduate Center from 1980 to 1984. She also served as president of the Eastern Division of the American Philosophical Association in 2001–2002.

She was named Distinguished Professor at the City University of New York – Graduate Center and Hunter College in 1996.

Held defended care ethics as a moral framework distinct from Kantian, utilitarian, and virtue ethics. She held that care is fundamental to human institutes and practices, indeed to our survival, as illumined by the Tong and Williams quote: "There can be no ju[s]tice without care…for without care no child would survive and there would be no persons to respect."

Her work on the morality of political violence viewed through the window of the ethics of care has also been significantly influential.

== Personal life and death ==
Held was born in Mendham, New Jersey, on October 28, 1929, and died on May 26, 2026, at the age of 96.

== Selected works ==
=== Books ===
- Held, Virginia (1970). The Public Interest and Individual Interests. New York: Basic Books. ISBN 9780465067732.
- Held, Virginia; Morgenbesser, Sidney; Nagel, Thomas (1974). Philosophy, Morality, and International Affairs: Essays Edited for the Society for Philosophy and Public Affairs. New York: Oxford University Press. ISBN 9780195017595.
- Held, Virginia (1989). Rights and Goods: Justifying Social Action. Chicago: University of Chicago Press. ISBN 9780226325880.
- Held, Virginia (1993). Feminist Morality : Transforming Culture, Society, and Politics. Chicago: University of Chicago Press. ISBN 9780226325934.
- Hunter College Women's Studies Collective, Virginia Held; et al. (2005). Women's Realities, Women's Choices: An Introduction to Women's Studies (third ed.). New York: Oxford University Press. ISBN 9780195150353.
- Held, Virginia (2006). The Ethics of Care: Personal, Political, and Global (second ed.). Oxford New York: Oxford University Press. ISBN 9780195325904.
- Held, Virginia (2008). How Terrorism is Wrong: Morality and Political Violence. Oxford New York: Oxford University Press. ISBN 9780195329599.

=== Chapters in books ===
- Held, Virginia (2008), "Gender identity and the ethics of care in globalized society", in DesAutels, Peggy; Whisnant, Rebecca (eds.), Global feminist ethics: feminist ethics and social theory, Feminist Constructions, Lanham, Maryland: Rowman & Littlefield, pp. 43–58, ISBN 9780742559103.

=== Journal articles ===
- Held, Virginia (January 1989). "Birth and death". Ethics. 99 (2). University of Chicago Press: 362–388. doi:10.1086/293070. JSTOR 2381439. S2CID 144938730.

=== Encyclopedia articles ===
- Feminism and Political Theory in The Blackwell Guide to Social and Political Philosophy
- Rights: Moral and Legal from A Companion to Feminist Philosophy
- Feminist Social and Political Philosophy in Encyclopedia of Philosophy Supplement (1997).
- "Power" in Blackwell Dictionary of Business Ethics
- Mass Media, Moral Pluralism in Encyclopedia of Ethics

For further works see C.V.
