= Ethical relationship =

An ethical relationship, in most theories of ethics that employ the term, is a basic and trustworthy relationship that one individual may have with another, that cannot necessarily be characterized in terms of any abstraction other than trust and common protection of each other's body. Honesty is very often a major focus.

== Basics ==
Usually studied is the relationship between the mother and child, and second most basic is between sexual partners—the focus of feminism and Queer theory respectively, in which relationships are central. Family role theory extends this to study paternalistic, maternalistic and sibling roles, and postulates that one's later relationships are formed largely in order to fill the roles one has grown to find comfortable as part of one's family environment—the family of origin thus setting pattern for the family of choice. Another type of ethical relationship is that between the student at an institution and his or her instructor. Because teaching is “leadership based upon moral and ethical principles.” The student is positioned into a role where participation means understanding and resolving multiple issues of ethics, including the actions of his or her professor or instructor.

== Contrasting theories ==
As contrasted to theories of ethics that derive from dispute resolution, or the meta-ethics as defined in Western moral philosophy, ethical traditions emphasizing abstract moral codes expressed in some language with some judgmental hierarchy, ethical relationship theories tend to emphasize human development. Thus they focus on unequal power and such matters as sexual honesty, marital commitment, child-raising, and responsibility to conduct such essential body and care matters as toilet training, weaning, forming attitudes to sexuality and to masturbation. Failures to consider consequences of teachings or examples set in these matters is disastrous, as it leads to failures of the most fundamental relationship any person has: to their own body, shame in it, pride in it, care for it, etc. Care and concern for other's bodies follows.

No ethical tradition has failed to prescribe at least some rules for the conduct of such relationships.

Carol Gilligan famously championed the role of relationships as central to moral reasoning, and superior as a basis for understanding human choices than any prior linguistic or meta-ethical concept. This perspective is now commonly called the ethics of care.

Lawrence Kohlberg, famous for work on moral development as a part of human development, eventually joined Gilligan in starting a descriptive ethics of relationship conduct in what they called the ethical community or just community. This was in effect a community of practice which, at least in Kohlberg's conception, had a core epistemic community of those trusted to define and resolve the disputes between members, and to facilitate the growth of moral development, not only in children, but in prisoners and others.

Donald R. C. Reed, whose book Following Kohlberg: Liberalism and the Practice of Democratic Community (1998) outlined the extension of these principles to deliberative democracy, claims that "During the four years following publication of Gilligan's In a Different Voice (1982), Kohlberg and Gilligan both revised their accounts of moral development so that they converged far more than is commonly recognized." Reed argued for "extending this convergence to include the understanding developed in the just community projects."

There is also potential for application of these methods to ethical tradition. Kohlberg's student Burton Visotzky, for instance, in The Genesis of Ethics, 1997, applied the relationship approach to Ethics in the Bible. The book focuses on the choices and interactions of major characters in the Book of Genesis. Visotzky exploits much of the Talmudic, midrash and magisterium, demonstrating that these Jewish theological traditions too had often focused on the ethical relationship, not only between Man and God, but between others in one's family, tribe or community.

Mohandas Gandhi, Confucius, Menno Simons and Baruch Spinoza are examples of figures in moral philosophy and political philosophy who focused first and foremost on the ethical choices made in the actual framing and encounter of moral interventions. Greens and New Confucians are two examples of modern movements that are derived in part from relational traditions.

== See also ==
- Global ethics
