= Philip L. Quinn =

American philosopher and theologian (1940–2004)

Philip Lawrence Quinn (June 22, 1940 – November 13, 2004) was a philosopher and theologian. He graduated from Georgetown University in 1962 and went on to earn a master's degree in physics from the University of Delaware in 1966. He then attended the University of Pittsburgh, where he received his master's and doctoral degrees in philosophy. Quinn joined the faculty of Brown University. At Brown, he was very popular and taught courses in the philosophy of physics, ethics, and related fields. In 1985, he assumed a position as the John A. O'Brien Professor of Philosophy at the University of Notre Dame. Quinn served in 1994–1995 as President of the Central Division of the American Philosophical Association (APA).

In March 2010, the Philip L. Quinn Fellowship was created at the National Humanities Center. The fellowship, endowed by the executors of Philip Quinn's estate, is awarded annually in philosophy, preferably supporting young women in the early stages of their scholarly careers.

The Philip L. Quinn Prize is considered the APA's "highest honor for service to the profession." Previous winners include Ruth Barcan Marcus, J.B. Schneewind, Anita Silvers, Ernest Sosa, Karen Hanson, Judith Jarvis Thomson, John Perry, Michael Bratman, Martha Nussbaum, Robert Audi, Peggy DesAutels, Geoffrey Sayre-McCord, Kwame Anthony Appiah, Anita L. Allen, and Virginia Held.
