= Tove Pettersen =

Norwegian feminist philosopher (born 1962)

Tove Pettersen (born 1962 at the island of Hidra) is a Norwegian feminist philosopher. She is currently Professor of Philosophy at the University of Oslo (UiO), Norway. Pettersen specializes in feminist ethics, the philosophy of Simone de Beauvoir, and feminist history of philosophy. She has contributed to the development of care ethics with her theory on mature care. Her work on forgotten women philosophers and on Beauvoir's ethics and humanism have received attention both in Norway and abroad.

== Education and career ==
Pettersen received her doctor artium (equivalent to PhD) in philosophy at the University of Oslo (UiO) in 2004 with a dissertation on the ethics of care. She completed her candidatus philologiae (equivalent to MA) in the history of ideas on postmodern philosophy, and has also studied economics and holds a candidata magisterii (equivalent BA) in political science. From 1992 to 2004 she was a lecturer at the Philosophy Department (UiO). In 2004-2006 she was granted a postdoctoral fellowship in order to work on Simone de Beauvoir's ethics, and she was also the director of research at the Ethics Programme. From 2006 to 2010 Pettersen was associate professor, and from 2011 to 2019 a full professor of philosophy at the Department of Philosophy, Classics, History of Art and Ideas (UiO). She has contributed to the integration of feminist philosophy at the University of Oslo by establishing the courses Gender and Philosophy (together with professor Else Wiestad), Feminist Ethics and Care and Conflicts. From 2019 Pettersen is a professor at The Center for Gender Research (UiO).

Pettersen is currently president of the International Simone de Beauvoir Society (a non-profit, MLA affiliated organization), and chairs organization's the board of directors. She is a member of the advisory board of Simone de Beauvoir Studies, and from 2015 to 2017 she was a member of the academic board of the Erasmus+ project Gender and Philosophy: Developing learning and teaching practices to include underrepresented groups (GAP).

== Philosophical work and interests ==
Pettersen specializes in feminist philosophy and feminist ethics, especially in the ethics of care and the Existential Ethics of Simone de Beauvoir. Although Pettersen works primarily in feminist philosophy, feminist ethics, moral philosophy, feminist history of philosophy and related areas such as ontology, epistemology, she is also interested in political philosophy, phenomenology, existential philosophy and postmodern philosophy. She has published books and articles within her field in English and Norwegian, and her articles have been translated into French and Italian. She has also contributed to the general dissemination of feminist philosophy in Norway and elsewhere through public lectures, interviews, and articles in the press. In 2012, she received the Norwegian award "På Kanten-prisen" for her work in feminist philosophy.

== Publications ==
A full list of Tove Pettersen's publications (including publications in Norwegian) is listed in CRIStin (Current Research Information System in Norway)

=== Selected books ===
- 2015: Pettersen, Tove og Annlaug Bjørsnøs (red.) Simone de Beauvor – A Humanist Thinker. Amsterdam/New York, Brill/Rodopi, 2008. ISBN 978-9004294400: Pettersen, Tove. 2008. Comprehending Care. Problems and Possibilities in the Ethics of Care. Landham, Mass., Lexington Books. ISBN 978-0739126165

=== Selected articles ===
- 2018: Pettersen, Tove. “Less Travelled Texts: The Case of Women Philosophers”, in Gender and Translation: Understanding Agents in Transnational Reception, eds. I.Herrero Lópes, J. Akujarvi, C. Alvstad, S. Lindtner. York University, Vita Traductiva, Collection in Translation Studies 2018, pp. 153–178. ISBN 9782924337134.
- 2017: Pettersen, Tove. “Love – According to Simone de Beauvoir”, in A Companion to Simone de Beauvoir (eds. L. Hengehold and N. Bauer). Hoboken: Wiley Blackwell. pp. 160–173. ISBN 978-1118796023.
- 2015: Pettersen, Tove. “Simone de Beauvoir: On Moral Freedom, Humanism and The Humanities”, in Simone de Beauvoir – A Humanist Thinker, (eds. T. Pettersen and A. Bjørsnøs). Amsterdam/New York, Rodopi, pp. 69–91.
- 2015: Pettersen, Tove and Annlaug Bjørsnøs. “Introduction. Beauvoir – A Humanist”, in Simone de Beauvoir – A Humanist Thinker, (eds.T. Pettersen and A. Bjørsnøs), Amsterdam/New York, Rodopi/Brill. ISBN 978-9004294400.
- 2012: Pettersen, Tove. “Conceptions of Care: Altruism, Feminism, and Mature Care”, in Hypatia, vol. 27, no 2 (Spring), pp. 366–389.
- 2012: Pettersen, Tove and M.H. Hem. “Assistenza evoluta e resiprocità: Una nuova concezione per l’ etica della care’", Lavoro sociale, 2012,12 (1):21–42.
- 2011: Pettersen, Tove. “The Ethics of Care: Normative Structures and Empirical Implications”, in Health Care Analysis, 19 (1), 2011, pp. 51–64.
- 2011: Pettersen, Tove and Marit Helene Hem. 2011. “Mature Care and Reciprocity. Two Cases from Acute Psychiatry”, in Nursing Ethics, 18(2), 2011, pp. 217–231.
- 2011: Hem, Marit Helene and Tove Pettersen. “Mature Care and Nursing in Psychiatry: Notions Regarding Reciprocity in Asymmetric Professional Relationships”, in Health Care Analysis, 19 (1), pp. 65–76.
- 2010: Pettersen, Tove.“Acting for Others: Moral Ontology in Beauvoir's Pyrrhus and Cineas”, in Simone de Beauvoir Studies Vol. 26, 2009–2010, Simone de Beauvoir Society, Menlo Park California, pp. 18–27. ISSN 1063-2042.
- 2008: Pettersen, Tove. “La joie existentielle et l’angoisse dans la philosophie morale de Simone de Beauvoir”, in (Re)découvrir l’œuvre de Simone de Beauvoir Du Deuxième Sexe à La cérémonie des adieux (ed. Julia Kristeva), Paris, Le Bord de L'eau, pp. 212–225. ISBN 978-2356870001.
- 2008: Pettersen, Tove. “Freedom and Feminism in Simone de Beauvoir's Philosophy”, in Simone de Beauvoir Studies, Vol. 24, 2007–2008, Simone de Beauvoir Society, Menlo Park California, pp. 57–65. ISSN 1063-2042.
- 2008: Pettersen, Tove. “Simone de Beauvoir's Philosophical Challenges: The Perspective of the Other” in Genderstudies, Frühjahr, Volume 12, Bern, pp. 5–6.
