= Don Collins Reed =

American philosopher

Don Collins Reed (born in Fayetteville, Arkansas) is an emeritus professor of ethics and history of philosophy at Wittenberg University.

Reed's early research has focused on the work of the ethicist Lawrence Kohlberg. In Following Kohlberg: Liberalism and the Practice of Democratic Community, published in 1998, Reed outlined the extension of principles of ethical community, developed by Kohlberg and Carol Gilligan, to that of deliberative democracy. Between 2003 and 2009, Reed observed and volunteered in public school and preschool classrooms in Springfield, Ohio, and served on the Board of Education of Springfield City Schools. His current research involves developing an integrated, multi-level model of human moral functioning based on recent scientific research on morality.
