= Donald Collins =

Donald Collins may refer to:

- Donald Collins (Maine politician) (1925–2018), American politician from Maine
- Donald Collins (Vermont politician) (born 1942), American politician from Vermont

== See also ==
- Don Collins (disambiguation)
