= Feminist justice ethics =

Feminist view on morality

Feminist justice ethics is a feminist view on morality which seeks to engage with, and ultimately transform, traditional universal approaches to ethics. Like most types of feminist ethics, feminist justice ethics looks at how gender is left out of mainstream ethical considerations. Mainstream ethics are argued to be male-oriented. However, feminist justice ethics does differ considerably from other feminist ethics. A universal set of ethics is a significant part of feminist justice ethics. Feminist justice ethics is clear in dividing "thick" morality from "thin" morality. Other ethical approaches that define themselves by differentiating groups from one another through culture or other phenomena are regarded as "thick" accounts of morality. Feminist justice ethics claims that "thick" accounts of morality, as opposed to "thin" accounts of morality, are intrinsically prone to eroding valid feminist critique.

== Overview ==
Feminist justice ethics is part of a range of feminist ethical perspectives. Other popular feminist approaches to ethics include feminist ethics of care, and feminist postmodern ethics. The implementation of a feminist ethic of care often draws critique from feminist justice ethics. Feminist ethics of care is premised by the idea that morality is shaped by relational versions of our self. Our moral relations take precedence. Feminist justice ethics differs itself from feminist ethics of care by chastising such a perspective for its abandonment of universal values. In feminist justice ethics, legitimate ethical critique cannot be made without utilizing a universal set of ethics. Meanwhile, feminist postmodern ethics puts forth an entirely different view. A feminist postmodern perspective will perceive androcentricity in many aspects of life, including epistemology. At the same time feminist postmodernism will deny the existence of objectivity within our world. This claim is based on the notion that knowledge is subjectively constructed. One feminist postmodern scholar has implicated the ethical outcomes of modern business norms as a result of this masculine-dominated society. Friction between feminist justice ethics and feminist postmodern ethics exists on the principle of universality. The former supports the idea of universal values, while the latter denies such values exist because it denies objectivity. Since a universal view on morality is typical in feminist justice ethics, the question arises: what specific values are actually universal? Nussbaum's capabilities approach attempts to tackle this question, and lists several traits she believes to be universal:

1. Life – ability to live out a natural lifespan;
2. Bodily Health – ability to have good health including reproductive health, adequate nourishment, shelter;
3. Bodily Integrity – freedom of movement, security from physical violation, sexual and reproductive autonomy;
4. Senses, Imagination and Thought – ability to use all of these fully in an educated way;
5. Emotions – ability to be able to be attached to others, to have a capacity for love and affection;
6. Practical Reason – to be able to reflect rationally, identify one's own conception of the good life and plan for it;
7. Affiliation – ability to live with others in personal relationships and social communities;
8. Other Species – ability to live in relation to nature;
9. Play – ability to enjoy recreation;
10. Control over one's material and political environment – ability to participate in political choices, ability to hold property, to work on equal terms with others.

== Criticisms ==
=== Feminist ethics of care ===
Feminist ethics of care disagrees with feminist justice ethics on some issues. Feminist ethics of care critiques feminist justice ethics with the claim that by lumping women into universal categories of being, the emphasis on distinct virtues that may be held primarily by women is lost. This loss of emphasis leads back to the masculine norms that feminist ethics are attempting to critique.

=== Feminist postmodern ethics ===
Feminist postmodern ethics may cite a number of factors. One source of concern would be the universality that is presented by many feminist justice ethicists. Feminist postmodern ethics is heavily reliant on deconstructing society and critiquing objectivity. Another point of concern regarding Nussbaum's argument in particular is that feminist justice ethics may ignore women who do not belong to Western cultures. By assuming ethics from a Western point of view, other views on ethics may be lost or seen as inferior.

== See also ==
- Ethics of care
- Feminism
- Feminist ethics
- Postmodern feminism
