= Armen T. Marsoobian =

Historical researcher

Armen T. Marsoobian is an academic. He received a B.A. in history from Bucknell University and a Ph.D. in philosophy from Stony Brook University. He holds a chair in the philosophy department at Southern Connecticut State University. Marsoobian was awarded the Hrant Dink Foundation Prize for Historical Research for studies on the Armenian genocide.

He is the editor-in-chief of the journal Metaphilosophy.
