= Fina Miralles Nobell =

Catalan artist (born 1950)

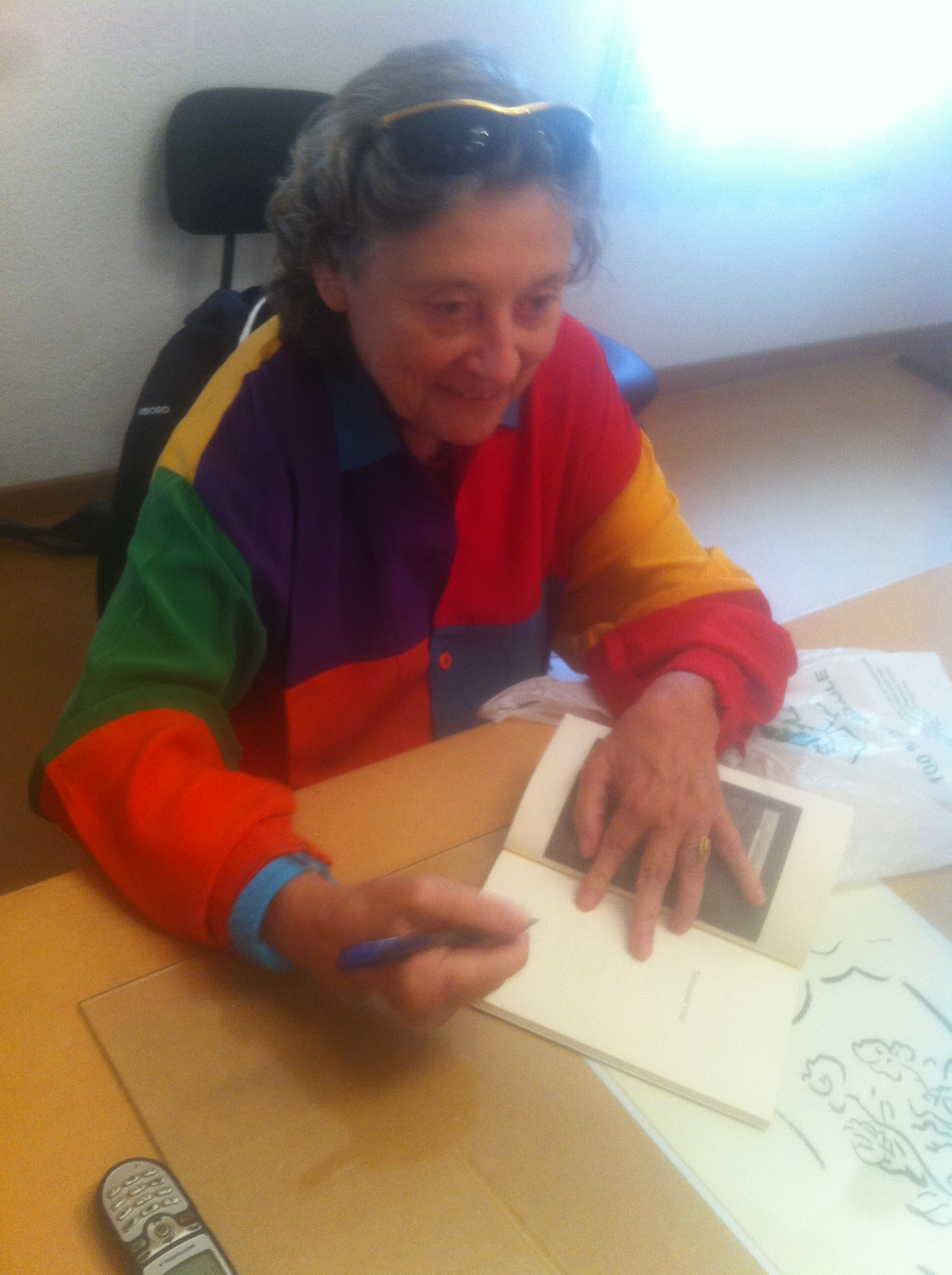
- Fina Miralles at the presentation of her work "Serrallonga" in Agramunt in 2015
- Born: September 27, 1950 (age 75); Sabadell
- Movement: conceptual, nature art
- Website: www.finamiralles.com

Fina Miralles Nobell (born 27 September 1950 in Sabadell) is a Catalan artist working across conceptual art, land art, performance art and painting. She is considered one of the most significant Spanish artists active from the 1970s onward, and was among a group of Catalan conceptual artists who worked with nature and the body during the final years of the Franco dictatorship.

== Art career ==
She studied at the Faculty of Fine Arts at the University of Barcelona. She took part in founding and running several emblematic contemporary-art spaces in Catalonia, including the Sala Vinçon in Barcelona, Sala Tres in Sabadell, and Espai 13 at the Fundació Joan Miró in Barcelona. From 1983, she left the world of professional art and travels to Latin America and France. Settled permanently in Cadaqués in 1999, after twenty-five years of pilgrimage.

== Work ==
Miralles began her career in the early 1970s with a body of conceptual and land-art work centred on the relationship between nature and artifice. Her best-known series include Translacions (Translations, 1973–1974), in which natural elements were displaced into non-natural settings, among them the performance Dona-arbre (Woman-Tree, 1973) carried out at Sant Llorenç del Munt, and Relacions (Relations, 1975), documenting the relationship of the body with natural elements. In 1974 she presented Imatges del zoo (Images of the Zoo) at the Sala Vinçon in Barcelona, staging the exhibition space as a zoo in which the artist herself appeared as one of the caged subjects. In the 1980s, following extended travels in Latin America, France and Italy, her work shifted toward painting and graphic work marked by a search for spirituality; after 2000 she returned to action and performance art in dialogue with the land and sea, and in later years has published poetry. Her work is held in the collections of the Museu d'Art de Sabadell, the Museo Reina Sofía in Madrid, and MACBA in Barcelona.

== Exhibitions, a selection ==
- 1972 Sensitiveland. First solo exhibition.
- 1978 Mediterrània t’estim. Muntatge. XXXVIII Venice Biennale.
- 1980 Les mides del marc. Muntatge. Espai b5-125 of the Art Department of the Autonomous University of Barcelona.
- 1981 Terra. Muntatge. Acadèmia de Belles Arts de Sabadell.
- 1982 En l’aire. Muntatge. Metrònom, Barcelona.
- 1996 Memorial. Sobre el tema de la rosassa de les catedrals gòtiques. Oli sobre tela de gran format. Sabadell
- 2016 Reposició de Naturaleses Naturals, Sala Vinçon, Barcelona, and at MAN National Archaeological Museum, Madrid.
- 2020–2021 Fina Miralles: I Am All the Selves that I Have Been (Soc totes les que he sigut), curated by Teresa Grandas, at MACBA, Barcelona.

== Awards ==
- 2018 - National Culture Award of Catalonia.
