= Metaphilosophy (journal) =

- Subject: Metaphilosophy
- Language: English
- Edited by: Armen T. Marsoobian

Publication details
- History: 1970-present
- Publisher: Wiley

Standard abbreviations
- ISO 4: Metaphilosophy

Indexing
- ISSN: 1467-9973
- OCLC no.: 49883085

Links
- Journal homepage; Online archive

Metaphilosophy is a peer-reviewed academic journal covering metaphilosophy. It is abstracted and indexed by PhilPapers and the Philosopher's Index.

Metaphilosophy was established in 1970 by Terry Bynum and Richard Reese. "Metaphilosophy" was given a working definition in the first issue of the journal as "the investigation of the nature of philosophy, with the central aim of arriving at a satisfactory explanation of the absence of uncontested philosophical claims and arguments." The journal is published by John Wiley & Sons and the editor-in-chief is Armen T. Marsoobian (Southern Connecticut State University).
