= Hilde Lindemann =

American philosopher

Hilde Lindemann M.A. Ph.D.
- Education: Fordham University
- Employer: Michigan State University

Hilde Lindemann (also Hilde Lindemann Nelson) is an American philosophy professor and bioethicist and emerita professor at Michigan State University. Lindemann earned her B.A. in German language and literature in 1969 at the University of Georgia. Lindemann also earned her M.A. in theatre history and dramatic literature, in 1972, at the University of Georgia. Lindemann began her career as a copyeditor for several universities. She then moved on to a job at the Hastings Center in New York City, an institute focused on bioethics research, and co-authored book The Patient in the Family, with James Lindemann Nelson, before deciding to earn a Ph.D. in philosophy at Fordham University in 2000. Previously, she taught at the University of Tennessee and Vassar College and served as the associate editor of the Hastings Center Report (1990–95). Lindemann usually teaches courses on feminist philosophy, identity and agency, naturalized bioethics, and narrative approaches to bioethics at Michigan State University.

== Contributions to philosophy ==
Lindemann's work primarily focuses on feminist bioethics, the ethics of families, feminist ethics, and the social construction of identities. She is the former editor of Hypatia: A Journal of Feminist Philosophy and was also coeditor, with Sara Ruddick and Margaret Urban Walker, of the Feminist Constructions series for Rowman & Littlefield. In addition, she coedited, with James Lindemann Nelson, a series on Reflective Bioethics for Routledge. Lindemann is a Hastings Center Fellow, a member of the advisory board for the Women's Bioethics Project (2006–), and was the president of the American Society for Bioethics and Humanities (2008–2009).

Hilde Lindemann is a narrative ethicist. A narrative approach uses stories and relationships between people in specific cases, as well as generalizable examples, for moral contexts and discussion (Gotlib).

Two of her books, Holding and Letting Go: The Social Practice of Personal Identities and Alzheimer's: Answers to Hard Questions for Families, co-authored by her partner James Lindemann Nelson, have various reviews that summarize philosophical theories and ethics demonstrated in her works.

The review of Holding and Letting Go: The Social Practice of Personal Identities and Alzheimer's Answer to Hard Questions for Families explains that Lindemann adopts a non-obscure, story-related approach to make readers think about realistic situations: "Only when we see ethical lives as diachronically and interpersonally structured and as embedded in narratively rich contexts can ethical reflection take hold in actual persons' lives" (Christman).

The review of the co-authored book, Alzheimer's: Answers to Hard Questions for Families, also demonstrates that Lindemann employs case studies and life experiences for the patients and caregivers to convey ideas in her work (Moody). This method of provoking thought is aimed at a wide general audience of people who are not necessarily ethics scholars.

== Quotes on philosophy ==
- "I think it's a great mistake to see feminism as a war on men. Men aren't responsible for the subordination of women – they just benefit from it. It's not politically useful to set men up as the enemy, because that alienates people whom we need as allies. And it perpetuates the victor/vanquished, master/slave relation that's the whole problem in the first place. If the gender system is ever to be dismantled, it won't be by declaring war on men. It's much better to affirm lots of differences among people without insisting that differences have to be ordered into power hierarchies"(Interview at 3AM Magazine 2012).
- "Narrativists have claimed, among other things, that stories of one kind or another are required: (1) to teach us our duties, (2) to guide morally good action, (3) to motivate morally good action, (4) to justify action on moral grounds, (5) to cultivate our moral sensibilities, (6) to enhance our moral perception, (7) to make actions of persons morally intelligible, and (8) to reinvent ourselves as better persons (Nelson 2001, 36)." (Gotlib).
- "It might help to recall that personhood, as I have been conceptualizing it, is a social practice consisting of four necessary moments: (1) A human being feels, watches, wonders, thinks, or in some other respect engages in the mental activity that gives rise to her personality. (2) The mental activity finds bodily expression. (3) Another human being recognizes it as the expression of a personality. (4) And responds." (Holding and Letting Go: The Social Practice of Personal Identities)

== Professional publications ==
Lindemann has published numerous peer-reviewed articles in journals such as The Journal of Medical Ethics, The American Journal of Bioethics, The Hastings Center Report, Metaphilosophy, and Hypatia. Her books include Holding and Letting Go: The Social Practice of Personal Identities, An Invitation to Feminist Ethics, Damaged Identities, Narrative Repair, Alzheimer's: Answers to Hard Questions for Families, and The Patient in the Family. Lindemann has also edited five collections: Feminism and Families; Stories and Their Limits: Narrative Approaches to Bioethics; Rights, Recognition, and Responsibility: Feminist Ethics and Social Theory; Meaning and Medicine: A Reader in the Philosophy of Medicine; and, with Marian Verkerk and Margaret Urban Walker, Naturalized Bioethics (Cambridge 2008). Her most recent book, Holding and Letting Go: The Social Practice of Personal Identities, was published by Oxford University Press in 2014.

== Awards and distinctions ==
In addition to being named a Hastings Center Fellow and having been elected President of the American Society of Bioethics and Humanities, Lindemann awarded a NWO (Netherlands Organization for Scientific Research) grant (2004–2008), a National Endowment for the Humanities grant, and several grants from the University of Tennessee including the Haines-Morris grant. Lindemann had also received a Distinguished Service Award from the American Society of Bioethics and is both a Fulbright scholar (1969) and a Woodrow Wilson fellow (1969).

== Selected works ==
- Lindemann, Hilde (2006). An invitation to feminist ethics. Boston: McGraw-Hill. ISBN 9780072850239.

Chapter 1, "What Is Feminist Ethics?" reprinted in: Shafer-Landau, Russ (2010). The ethical life: fundamental readings in ethics and moral problems. New York: Oxford University Press. ISBN 9780195377699.
Chapter 1 also reprinted in: Feinberg, Joel; Shafer-Landau, Russ (2011). Reason and responsibility: readings in some basic problems of philosophy (14th ed.). Boston, Massachusetts: Wadsworth. ISBN 9781439046944.

- Lindemann, Hilde; Verkerk, Marian; Walker, Margaret Urban (2009). Naturalized bioethics: toward responsible knowing and practice. Cambridge New York: Cambridge University Press. ISBN 9780521719407.
- Lindemann, Hilde (2014). Holding and letting go: the social practice of personal identities. New York: Oxford University Press. ISBN 9780199349470.

=== Hilde Lindemann Nelson ===
- Lindemann Nelson, Hilde; Lindemann Nelson, Jamie (1995). The patient in the family. New York: Routledge.
- Lindemann Nelson, Hilde; Lindemann Nelson, Jamie (1996). Alzheimer's: answers to hard questions for families. New York: Doubleday. In Dutch translation, Amsterdam: De Arbeiderspers, 1998.
- Lindemann Nelson, Hilde; Lindemann Nelson, Jamie (1999). Meaning and medicine: a reader in the philosophy of health care. New York: Routledge.
- Lindemann Nelson, Hilde (2001). Damaged identities, narrative repair. Ithaca: Cornell University Press.

== Selected honors and grants ==
Most recently, Hilde Lindemann served as President-Elect (2007–2008) and President (2008–2009) for the American Society of Bioethics and Humanities. She was elected a Hastings Center Fellow in October 2004.

Lindemann has received two NWO (Netherlands Organization for Scientific Research) grants, one of €30,000, plus €3,000 each from Michigan State University, Newcastle University, Uppsala University, and Lübeck University to build a network on the ethics of families and care (2013–2016). The other NWO grant (with Marian Verkerk and Margaret Urban Walker) of €25,000, plus the equivalent of €3,500 each from Michigan State University and Arizona State University, for an international collaboration to produce a bioethics whose moral epistemology and psychology are naturalized and whose ethical focus is on practices of responsibility (2004–2008).

She has also won awards such as the American Society of Bioethics and Humanities Distinguished Service Award (2003) and National Endowment for the Humanities grant to conduct a Summer Seminar for College and University Teachers, entitled "Bioethics in Particular," $87,000. Project co-director (1999–2000). Lindemann was named a Fulbright scholar (1969) and a Woodrow Wilson fellow (1969).

== See also ==
- American philosophy
- American philosophers
