= Ecomasculinity =

Ecomasculinity is a complementary field of thought to ecofeminism. While ecofeminism has traditionally focused on studying issues such as how the exploitation of women and women's bodies is congruent with the exploitation of nature, ecomasculinity studies men's role in this process and looks for ways to enable men to take on roles that would challenge exploitative thought patterns and practices. As an academic field, early work on ecomasculinity has been carried on by the likes of Richard Twine, Paul Pulé, and Greta Gaard.
