= Margaret Urban Walker =

American feminist philosopher

- Born: Margaret Urban; August 8, 1948 (age 78); United States

Philosophical work
- Institutions: Marquette University; Arizona State University; Fordham University; Washington University in St. Louis; Catholic University of Leuven; Princeton University
- Main interests: Ethical theory; feminist ethics; moral psychology; reparative justice

Margaret Urban Walker (born August 8, 1948) is an American philosopher and the Donald J. Schuenke Chair Emerita in Philosophy at Marquette University. Before her appointment at Marquette, she was the Lincoln Professor of Ethics at Arizona State University, and before that she was at Fordham University. She has also previously held visiting appointments at Washington University in St. Louis, University of South Florida, and Catholic University of Leuven.

In 2002, Walker was awarded the Cardinal Mercier chair at the Catholic University of Leuven, and was the first woman ever to hold the chair.

== Education and career ==
Walker (born Margaret Urban) received her bachelor's in philosophy from the University of Illinois Chicago in 1969. She went on to receive her master's in philosophy from Northwestern University in 1971, and her doctorate in philosophy, also from Northwestern, in 1975.

Walker was a member of the Philosophy Department at Fordham University for 28 years before moving to Arizona State University from 2002 to 2010 (where she received the Defining Edge Research in the Humanities Award in 2007), and moving to Marquette University in 2010. She retired in May 2017. She held visiting appointments at the Washington University in St. Louis, the University of South Florida, and the Catholic University of Leuven. During her second visiting appointment at the Catholic University of Leuven, she was the first woman to hold the Cardinal Mercier Chair in Philosophy. She also was a Laurance S. Rockefeller Fellow at Princeton University's Center for Human Values from 2003 to 2004.

== Research areas ==
Walker's recent research has focused on repairing moral relations after wrongdoing, especially in relation to political violence. She has contributed to research projects with the International Center for Transitional Justice on gender and reparations and truth commissions. She was drawn to this area through her earlier work, in which she focused on the effects of social inequalities on the way morality is understood in ethics and everyday life. Some of her earlier research focused on developing a social differences-focused approach to ethical theory. She strongly defends the view that although moral understandings are inextricably linked to the historical and social practices that they derived from, that those historical and social practices not only can be, but must be critically assessed.

== Publications ==
=== Books ===
Walker has authored seven books, numerous book chapters, and a large number of papers.

- Walker, Margaret Urban (2003). Moral contexts. Lanham, Maryland: Rowman & Littlefield Publishers. ISBN 9780742513792.
- Walker, Margaret Urban (2006). Moral repair: reconstructing moral relations after wrongdoing. Cambridge, UK New York: Cambridge University Press. ISBN 9780521009256.
- Walker, Margaret Urban (2007) [1998]. Moral understandings: a feminist study in ethics (2nd ed.). New York: Oxford University Press. ISBN 9780195315400.
- Walker, Margaret Urban (1999). Mother time: women, aging, and ethics. Lanham, Maryland: Rowman & Littlefield Publishers. ISBN 9780847692613.
- Walker, Margaret Urban; DesAutels, Peggy (2004). Moral psychology: feminist ethics and social theory. Feminist Constructions. Lanham, Maryland: Rowman & Littlefield Publishers. ISBN 9780742534803.
- Walker, Margaret Urban; Lindemann, Hilde; Verkerk, Marian (2009). Naturalized bioethics: toward responsible knowing and practice. Cambridge New York: Cambridge University Press. ISBN 9780521719407.
- Walker, Margaret Urban (2010). What is reparative justice. Milwaukee, Wisconsin: Marquette University Press. ISBN 9780874621785.

=== Book chapters ===
- Walker, Margaret Urban (2001), "Seeing power in morality: a proposal for feminist naturalism in ethics", in DesAutels, Peggy; Waugh, Joanne (eds.), Feminists doing ethics, Lanham, Maryland: Rowman & Littlefield Publishers, pp. 3–14, ISBN 9780742512115.

=== Journal articles ===
From 2005 to 2010, Walker served as an associate editor of Hypatia: A Journal of Feminist Philosophy. She served as series co-editor of Feminist Constructions, a 25-volume series of books released between 2002 and 2007. She co-edited the annual volume of the Association of Feminist Ethics and Social Theory from 2003 to 2005.

- Walker, Margaret Urban (June 1989). "Moral understandings: alternative "epistemology" for a feminist ethics". Hypatia. 4 (2): 15–28. doi:10.1111/j.1527-2001.1989.tb00570.x. JSTOR 3809803. S2CID 145366022.
- Walker, Margaret Urban (January 1991). "Moral luck and the virtues of impure agency". Metaphilosophy. 22 (1–2): 14–27. doi:10.1111/j.1467-9973.1991.tb00808.x.
- Walker, Margaret Urban (August 1992). "Feminism, ethics, and the question of theory". Hypatia. 7 (3): 23–38. doi:10.1111/j.1527-2001.1992.tb00903.x. JSTOR 3809871. S2CID 145704823.
- Walker, Margaret Urban (January 1996). "Some thoughts on feminists, philosophy, and feminist philosophy". Metaphilosophy. 27 (1–2): 222–225. doi:10.1111/j.1467-9973.1996.tb00882.x.
- Walker, Margaret Urban (August 2005). "Diotima's ghost: the uncertain place of feminist philosophy in professional philosophy". Hypatia. 20 (3): 153–164. doi:10.1111/j.1527-2001.2005.tb00492.x. JSTOR 3811120. S2CID 144794823.
- Walker, Margaret Urban (Fall 2006). "Restorative justice and reparations". Journal of Social Philosophy. 37 (3): 377–395. doi:10.1111/j.1467-9833.2006.00343.x.
- Walker, Margaret Urban (July 2010). "Truth telling as reparations". Metaphilosophy. 41 (4): 525–545. doi:10.1111/j.1467-9973.2010.01650.x. S2CID 146781852.
- Walker, Margaret Urban (September 2013). "Third parties and the social scaffolding of forgiveness". Journal of Religious Ethics. 41 (3): 495–512. doi:10.1111/jore.12026.
