= Feminist ethics =

Approach to ethics

Feminist ethics is an approach to ethics that builds on the belief that traditionally ethical theorizing has undervalued and/or underappreciated women's moral experience, which is largely male-dominated, and it therefore chooses to reimagine ethics through a holistic feminist approach to transform it.

== Concept ==
Feminist philosophers critique traditional ethics as pre-eminently focusing on men's perspective with little regard for women's viewpoints. Caring and the moral issues of private life and family responsibilities were traditionally regarded as trivial matters. Generally, women are portrayed as ethically immature and shallow in comparison to men. Traditional ethics prizes masculine cultural traits like "independence, autonomy, intellect, will, wariness, hierarchy, domination, culture, transcendence, product, asceticism, war, and death," and gives less weight to culturally feminine traits like "interdependence, community, connection, sharing, emotion, body, trust, absence of hierarchy, nature, immanence, process, joy, peace, and life." Should women embody or use any traditionally masculine cultural traits they are seen as other or as an attempt to be more like men. Traditional ethics has a "male" orientated convention in which moral reasoning is viewed through a framework of rules, rights, universality, and impartiality and becomes the standard of a society. The "female" approaches to moral reasoning emphasizes relationships, responsibilities, particularity, and partiality.

== Historical background ==
Feminist ethics developed from Mary Wollstonecraft's 'Vindication of the Rights of Women' published in 1792. With the new ideas from the Enlightenment, individual feminists being able to travel more than ever before, generating more opportunities for the exchange of ideas and advancement of women's rights. With new social movements like Romanticism there developed unprecedented optimistic outlook on human capacity and destiny. This optimism was reflected in John Stuart Mill's essay The Subjection of Women (1869). Feminist approaches to ethics, were further developed around this period by other notable people like Catherine Beecher, Charlotte Perkins Gilman, Lucretia Mott and Elizabeth Cady Stanton with an emphasis on the gendered nature of morality, specifically related to 'women's morality'.

== Charlotte Perkins Gilman ==
The American writer and sociologist Charlotte Perkins Gilman imagined a fictional "Herland". In this male-free society, women produce their daughters through parthenogenesis and live a superior morality. This women-centered society valued both industriousness and motherhood while discouraged individualistic competitive approaches to life. Gilman thought that in such a scenario women could relate cooperatively as there would be no requirement to dominate each other. Herland cultivates and combines the best "feminine" virtues and the best "masculine" virtues together as co-extensive with human virtue. If a society wants to be virtuous, according to Gilman, it should exemplify the fictional utopia of Herland. However so long as women are dependent on men for economic support, women will continue to be known for their servility and men for their arrogance. Women need to be men's economic equals before they can develop truly human moral virtue, this is a perfect blend of pride and humility that we call self-respect.

== Feminist care ethics ==
Carol Gilligan and Nel Noddings are exponents of a feminist care ethics which criticize traditional ethics as deficient to the degree they lack, disregard, trivialize or attack women's cultural values and virtues. In the 20th-century feminist ethicists developed a variety of care focused feminist approaches to ethics in comparison to non-feminist care-focused approaches to ethics, feminist ones tend to appreciate the impact of gender issues more fully. Feminist care-focused ethicists note the tendencies of patriarchal societies not to appreciate the value and benefits of women's ways of loving, thinking, working and writing and tend to view females as subordinate. This is why some social studies make a conscious effort to adopt feminist ethics, rather than just the traditional ethics of studies. An example of this was Roffee and Waling's 2016 study into microaggressions against the LGBTIQ community. Even though it was focused on the LGBTIQ community the feminist ethics were better suited, as they are more considerate to the vulnerabilities and needs of the participants. Medical fields also fail to recognize that ethics plays an often negative part in the LGBTIQ community in how they receive treatment and what treatments are given as options to them. As well as how women are also treated within medical fields.

== Feminist matrixial ethics ==
The 'metafeminist' theory of the matrixial gaze and the matrixial time-space, coined and developed by artist, philosopher and psychoanalyst Bracha L. Ettinger since 1985, articulates a revolutionary philosophical approach that, in "daring to approach", to use Griselda Pollock's description of Ettinger's ethical turn, "the prenatal with the pre-maternal encounter", violence toward women at war, and the Shoah, has philosophically established the rights of each female subject over her own reproductive body, and offered a language to relate to human experiences which escape the phallic domain. Ettingerian matrixial sphere is both a matricial space of encounter in archaic corporeality and a symbolic ethical and aesthetic field - feminine/maternal and prenatal/prematernal conceptual-psychoanalytical field with a psychic and symbolic dimension that the 'phallic' language and regulations cannot control. Thus, Ettinger offers a language to talk about the female rights over her reproductive body while revolutionizing philosophy and psychoanalysis through matrixiality where feminine sexuality and symbolic responsibility coexist. In Ettinger's model, the relations between self and other are of neither assimilation nor rejection but 'coemergence'. Feminine sexuality is not foreclosed when maternality emerges, matrixial desire is a mixture of both, thus the contradiction between them established by Sigmund Freud and Jacques Lacan recedes. The feminine is not an absolute alterity (the alterity established by Jacques Lacan and Emmanuel Levinas) and we are offered a language to rethink the archaic mother and the source of humanized life. With the 'originary response-ability', 'wit(h)nessing', 'borderlinking', 'communicaring', 'com-passion', 'seduction into life' and other processes invested by affects that occur in the Ettingerian matrixial time-space, (each process of transformation is named 'metamorphose') the feminine is presented as the source of humanized Ethics in all genders and enters all subjectivities. What Ettinger named 'seduction into life' occurs earlier than the primary seduction which passes through enigmatic signals from the maternal sexuality according to Jean Laplanche, since it is active in 'coemergence' in 'withnessing' for any born subject, earlier to its birth. Ettinger suggests to Emanuel Levinas in their conversations in 1991, that the feminine understood via the matrixial perspective is the heart and the source of Ethics. At the beginning of life, an originary 'fascinance' felt by the infant is related to the passage from response-ability to responsibility, from com-passion to compassion, and from wit(h)nessing to witnessing operated and transmitted by the m/Other. The 'differentiation in jointness' that is at the heart of the matrixial borderspace has deep implications in the relational field and for the ethics of care. The matrixial theory that proposes new ways to rethink sexual difference through the fluidity of boundaries informs aesthetics and ethics of compassion, carrying and non-abandonment in 'subjectivity as encounter-event'. It has become significant in transgender studies.

== Feminist justice ethics ==
Feminist justice ethics is a feminist view on morality which seeks to engage with, and ultimately transform, traditional universal approaches to ethics. Like most types of feminist ethics, feminist justice ethics looks at how gender is left out of mainstream ethical considerations. Mainstream ethics are argued to be male-oriented. However, feminist justice ethics does differ considerably from other feminist ethics. A universal set of ethics is a significant part of feminist justice ethics but depending on the geographical location, such as the difference between the Global North and Global South, may differ in how justice is applied and may change what is considered justice. Feminist justice ethics is clear in dividing "thick" morality from "thin" morality. Other ethical approaches that define themselves by differentiating groups from one another through culture or other phenomena are regarded as "thick" accounts of morality. Feminist justice ethics claims that "thick" accounts of morality, as opposed to "thin" accounts of morality, are intrinsically prone to eroding valid feminist critique.

== Womanist Ethics ==
Alice Walker devised the womanist ethical approach to redefine black women's experiences. The mainstream feminist and black equality movements neglected to fully capture the experiences of black women experiencing the intersection of racism and sexism. Walker thus developed womanist ethics to reposition the black woman as an autonomous, moral agent capable of participating equally in feminist discourse. Womanists examine the philosophical ideas of white, wealthy men and reject the universalized perspectives which fail to accurately capture the experience of nonwhites and women. Womanism instead focuses on promoting autonomy through developing the “self-awareness” of one's own moral agency in an oppressive society. Womanists develop this "self-awareness" by reexamining and articulating the unique experiences of black women in relation to their families, local communities, and larger society. Black feminists perceive themselves as the de facto representatives of their communities with a moral obligation to accurately represent not only their personal experiences, but the experiences of the broader community of blacks and black women specifically. With this burden in mind, black feminists adhering to womanist ethics work to reject stereotypes and misrepresentations from both white men and women and create their own narrative. Womanists thus believe in the necessity to incorporate contextual factors into ethical theories to avoid the problem of overgeneralizing a dominant group's worldview.

== Global Feminist Ethics ==
Global feminist ethics (also known as cosmopolitan feminist ethics) seeks to address challenges defining feminist thought in an international community with many different perspectives. International law typically uses a rights-based discourse promoting equal treatment; however, these rights typically are focused on a universalized male perspective, and equality in the law often neglects to combat the patriarchal norms consistent across countries with legal systems based on equal rights. For example, forced pregnancy would not even be considered a human rights violation because only women experience this form of assault. Thus, traditional definitions of international human rights frequently fail to address gendered experiences of violence and discrimination.

Global feminist ethicists attempt to resolve the male-focused universalization of human rights by conceptualizing a "global feminist consciousness." This concept seeks to address and incorporate different women's experiences based on religion, culture, race, and nationality while also resisting patriarchy. While it appears differently across contexts, patriarchy appears consistently in almost all countries, warranting a similarly unified response. However, this unification should not consist of a single identity or set of principles or values, or else it would fall prey to universalizing a single group's experiences. Instead, global feminists believe a "global feminist consciousness" requires collaborative effort of feminists from around the world to acknowledge multicultural differences and intersectionality.

== Feminist ethics and the future ==
Feminist ethicists believe there is an obligation for women's differing points of view to be heard and then to fashion an inclusive consensus view from them. To attempt to achieve this and to push towards gender equality with men together is the goal of feminist ethics. The fixing of these issues are important in modern times because of the shifting view points as well as what has considered to be 'ethical' in terms of treatment and how women, in particular, women's bodies should be treated.

"The goal of feminist ethics is the transformation of societies and situations where women are harmed through violence, subordination and exclusion. When such injustices are evident now and in the future, radical feminist activists will continue their work of protest and action following careful appraisal and reflection" With violence, it once again circles back to masculine behavior and traditional ethics that such behavior and treatment was encouraged. In today's society, the twentieth century, it is becoming less socially acceptable to commit violence against women.

== Feminist ethics and international relations ==
Feminist theories and that of ethics broaden the scope of the predominantly masculine sphere of International Relations. This is especially important for issues of the private realm to take stage into the public which includes issues such as children's rights, gender violence and discrimination, gender relations in war-torn societies, and other similar issues which remain difficult to appear relevant in the mainstream discussions of ethics in international relations. The feminist dialogues of ethics are almost inescapably present in the private realm and are known to only shadow dominant 'male' paradigms of ethics in the public realm. This is especially a reality in discussion of ethics in International Relations where it is predominantly built on a language of violence, technologies or economics and what are known to be the masculine topics of discussion.

== See also ==
- Bracha L. Ettinger
- Feminism in 1950s Britain
- Feminist political ecology
- First-wave feminism
- Eugenic Feminism
- Gender equality
- Gender mainstreaming
- Girl power
- Griselda Pollock
- Hilde Lindemann
- Jessica Valenti
- Judith Butler
- Mary Wollstonecraft
- Material feminism
- Matrixial Gaze
- Morality
- Naomi Wolf
- Postmodern feminism
- Pro-life feminism
- Rebecca Walker
- Second-wave feminism
- Sex-positive feminism
- Sheila Cavanagh
- The left and feminism
