= Peggy DesAutels =

American philosopher

Peggy J. DesAutels

Education
- Education: Washington University in St. Louis
- Thesis: Bridging Cognitive Science and Moral Philosophy (1995)

Philosophical work
- Institutions: University of Dayton; University of South Florida; Washington University in St. Louis
- Main interests: Moral psychology, feminist philosophy, feminist ethics, ethical theory, philosophy of mind, bioethics, medical ethics and cognitive science

Peggy Jo DesAutels is an American academic and professor emeritus of philosophy at the University of Dayton. Her research focuses on moral psychology, feminist philosophy, feminist ethics, ethical theory, philosophy of mind, bioethics, medical ethics and cognitive science. She has received multiple awards and recognitions including Distinguished Woman in Philosophy for 2014 by the Eastern Division of Society for Women in Philosophy, and the 2017 Philip L. Quinn Prize by the American Philosophical Association.

== Education ==
DesAutels received her Ph.D. in philosophy from Washington University in St. Louis in 1995 after earning an M.S. in computer science and an M.A. in philosophy.

== Career ==
DesAutels started teaching at the University of Dayton in 2001; she also served as the assistant director of the Ethics Center, and as assistant professor of philosophy at the University of South Florida. From 2010 to 2013, DesAutels served as the chair of the Committee on the Status of Women of the American Philosophical Association; she currently serves as an ex officio member of the committee as the Director of the Site Visit Program. At the University of Dayton she helped organize the "Diversity in Philosophy" conference in 2013; and the same year her team made national headlines for uncovering and reporting on sexual harassment at the University of Colorado.

As chair of the Committee on the Status of Women of the American Philosophical Association, DesAutels was outspoken against the problems facing women philosophers. She criticized the lack of gender parity in philosophy, as well as the prevalence of sexual harassment in academia, the underrepresentation of women philosophers in tenure-track positions, and the number of philosophy conferences with all-male lineups. DesAutels was named Distinguished Woman in Philosophy for 2014 by the Eastern Division of Society for Women in Philosophy.

DesAutels was also a research leader on a $3 million National Science Foundation (NSF) ADVANCE grant, awarded to a consortium including University of Dayton, aimed at advancing the recruitment and advancement of women in STEM (science, technology, engineering, and mathematics) fields.

DesAutels is the editor of several volumes in feminist ethics and moral psychology. She has been ranked among the "best minds in feminist philosophy" and her book Global Feminist Ethics offered "an important, thought-provoking" exploration of issues effecting women worldwide. She has also been published in academic journals such as the Journal of Social Philosophy, Philosophical Psychology, Hypatia: A Journal of Feminist Philosophy, and Midwest Studies in Philosophy; and has written chapters for a number of academic books on a range of topics.

In 2017, DesAutels was awarded the Philip L. Quinn Prize by the American Philosophical Association.

== Selected publications ==
- DesAutels, Peggy; Battin, Margaret; May, Larry (1999). Praying for a Cure: When Medical and Religious Practices Conflict. Lanham, Maryland: Rowman & Littlefield Publishers. ISBN 9780847692637.
- ———; Waugh, Joanne (2001). Feminists Doing Ethics. Lanham, Maryland: Rowman & Littlefield Publishers. ISBN 9780742512115. Selected as a Choice outstanding academic title for 2003.
- ———; Walker, Margaret Urban (2004). Moral Psychology: Feminist Ethics and Social Theory. Feminist Constructions. Lanham, Maryland: Rowman & Littlefield Publishers. ISBN 9780742534803.
- ———; Whisnant, Rebecca (2008). Global Feminist Ethics: Feminist Ethics and Social Theory. Feminist Constructions. Lanham, Maryland: Rowman & Littlefield. ISBN 9780742559103.
