= In a Different Voice =

1982 book by Carol Gilligan

- Author: Carol Gilligan
- Language: English
- Subject: Gender
- Publication date: 1982
- Publication place: United States
- Media type: Print (hardcover and paperback)
- Pages: 184
- ISBN: 0-674-44544-9

In a Different Voice: Psychological Theory and Women's Development is a book on gender studies by American professor Carol Gilligan, published in 1982, which Harvard University Press calls "the little book that started a revolution".

In the book, Gilligan criticized Kohlberg's stages of moral development of children. Kohlberg's data showed that girls on average reached a lower level of moral development than boys did. Kohlberg's theory (based on his 1958 dissertation) had been developed on a sample of boys (as he had been advised to do). Gilligan stated that the scoring method Kohlberg used tended to favor a principled way of reasoning (one more common to boys) over a moral argumentation concentrating on relations, which would be more amenable to girls. The analysis by Gilligan about Kohlberg's theory was later challenged, although the debate about Kohlberg's model not representing the full scope of the moral domain remains active.

== Theory ==
=== Gender differences ===
Unlike the work which led her to her own studies, Gilligan's In a Different Voice purports to take account of both men and women. She strives to emphasize that women, like men, are capable of thinking and acting in a manner associated with justice, and women with elements more associated with the value of care.

=== Images of self ===
When Gilligan asked women, "How would you describe yourself?" she found that women define who they are by describing relationships. Men defined themselves by separation, or the use of "I" statements. She also found that men think in more violent terms than women. Gilligan compares these results to childhood fairytales. Where men fantasize about slaying dragons, women fantasize about a relationship. "Justice is ultimate moral maturity for adolescents (usually male) who see themselves as autonomous. Care is the ultimate responsibility of adolescents (usually female) who see themselves as linked to others."

=== Stages ===
Gilligan found three stages to maturity when studying twenty-nine women from referrals of abortion and pregnancy-counseling centers. These stages are: preconventional, conventional, and postconventional. These stages are also part of Kohlberg's model.

==== Preconventional ====
The preconventional, or the orientation to individual survival, stage is to show that women are seeking "who they are." In other words, they usually felt alone in a hostile world and are unable to look past their own self-interest. In this stage, there is no thought of a "should" and women only think of what they want. During Gilligan's study of pregnant women, this stage showed this self-concept.

==== Conventional ====
The conventional stage, or the goodness of self-sacrifice, is when women think of themselves as selfless and begin to care more about others. This stage allows women to find solutions where no one is hurt or to choose the victim wisely. Women in this stage change their self-image and transition to ethical thinking.

==== Postconventional ====
The postconventional stage, or the responsibility for consequences of choice, is making a choice and then taking responsibility for that choice. In this stage, women tend to take control of their lives and realizing the seriousness of a situation, especially if there happened to be a chance to involve someone getting hurt. Also, women begin to take care of others instead of just caring about themselves in this stage. They also put out a sense of morality to those around them.

=== Derivations ===
A different voice is a communication theory derived from this book. Em Griffin asserts that Gilligan's theory of "moral development [claims] that women tend to think and speak in a different way than men when they confront ethical dilemmas." This theory also suggests the feminine ethic of care and the masculine ethic of justice.

=== Ethics of justice ===
Ethics of justice, also known as morality of justice, is the term used by Gillgian to describe the ethics and moral reasoning common to men and preferred by Kohlberg's stages of moral development. The ethics of justice deals with moral choices through a measure of rights of the people involved and chooses the solution that seems to damage the fewest people. Rooted in a respect for the legal system, it applies in the Western democracy ideas like social contract theory to everyday moral decisions.

== Controversy ==
Some have critiqued the work. In a contemporary review in The Boston Phoenix, Anita Diamant said that "In a Different Voice points the way to a new psychology that will not be divided against itself, one in which Gilligan’s insights will be integrated into a discussion of women and men that acknowledges different voices as a matter of course and no longer assigns them positions of superiority and inferiority. Still, there is a limit to how far Gilligan can go given her (necessary) theoretical starting point — correcting the past. What she has produced is still response. It pushes the debate forward, yet it is limited by the terms set by men who had no grasp of the worlds that flourished in their own kitchens and nurseries."

Later critics had more fundamental concerns. Christina Hoff Sommers argues in The War Against Boys that, "Gilligan has failed to produce the data for her research". Gilligan argued in response that, "her findings have been published in leading journals and that Sommers' points are not accurate," even though access to the raw data has been consistently denied to other researchers.

Reviews by Walker (2006) and Jaffee and Hyde (2001) found that Gilligan's theory was not supported by empirical studies. Her study conducted on 80 people which served as a base for her theory was later challenged by neo-Kohlbergian studies with the Defining Issues Test, in which females tend to get higher scores than males, though generally not significantly so.

In her article "Power, Resistance and Science", Naomi Weisstein makes a general argument against what she describes as "feminist psychologists", who "put forth a notion of female difference which, while no longer biologically based, is nevertheless essentialist, or at least highly decontextualized, for example, Carol Gilligan, In a Different Voice (1982); Sara Ruddick, Maternal Thinking: Towards a Politics of Peace (1990). That is, they assume that female difference is fixed, rather than contingent on social context."
