= Carol Gilligan =

American philosopher and psychologist (born 1936)

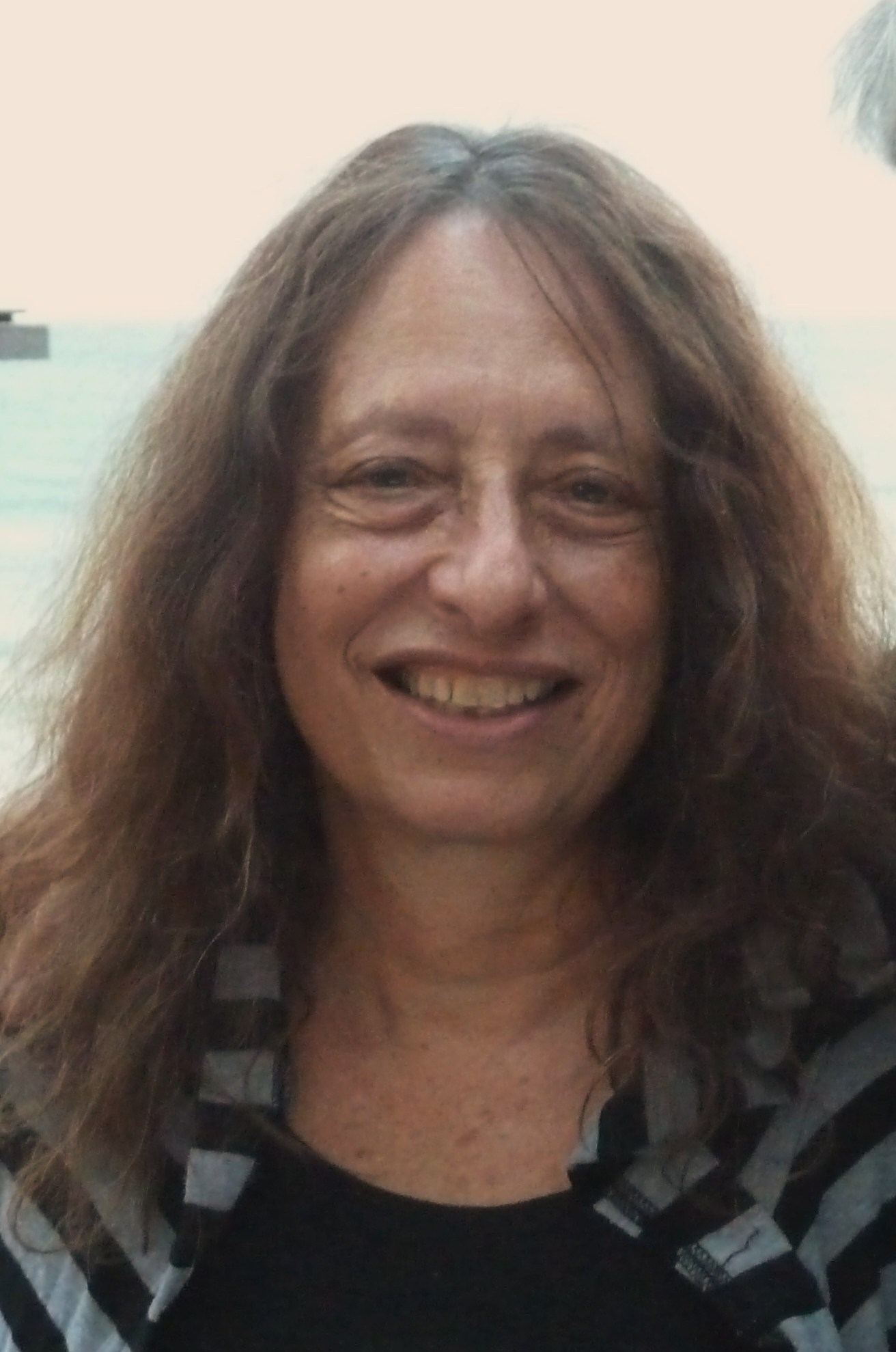
- Gilligan in 2011
- Born: November 28, 1936 (age 89); New York City, US
- Occupation: Professor
- Spouse: James Gilligan
- Children: 3
- Awards: 1984: Ms. Woman of the Year; 1992: Grawemeyer Award; 1996: Time magazine's 25 most influential people in the United States; 1998: Heinz Award; 2025: Kyoto Prize

Academic background
- Education: Swarthmore College; Radcliffe College; Harvard University

Academic work
- Discipline: Psychology; ethics; feminism
- Notable works: In a Different Voice; Mapping the Moral Domain; Making Connections; Meeting at the Crossroads; The Birth of Pleasure

Carol Gilligan (/ˈɡɪlɪɡən/; born November 28, 1936) is an American philosopher and psychologist, known for her work in feminist theory, ethical community, and ethical relationships.

Gilligan is a professor of humanities and applied psychology at New York University and was a visiting professor at the Centre for Gender Studies and Jesus College at the University of Cambridge until 2009. Her influential book, In a Different Voice (1982), theorized that moral decisions are guided by different interior voices and perspectives, a view contrary to Lawrence Kohlberg's stages of moral development.

In 1996, Time magazine listed her among America's 25 most influential people. She is the originator of the ethics of care and has been called "perhaps the world’s leading authority" on active listening.

== Biography ==
=== Early life and education ===
Carol Gilligan was raised in a Jewish family in New York City. She was the only child of a lawyer, William Friedman, and nursery school teacher, Mabel Caminez. She attended the public Hunter Model School and the Walden School, a progressive private school on Manhattan's Upper West Side and played piano.

Gilligan earned a B.A. in English literature summa cum laude from Swarthmore College, a master's degree in clinical psychology from Radcliffe College, and a Ph.D. in social psychology from Harvard University where she wrote her doctoral dissertation "Responses to Temptation: An Analysis of Motives". Disillusioned by academia, Gilligan worked for a time for a modern dance company in Cleveland.

=== Career ===
She began her teaching career as a lecturer at the University of Chicago (where her husband was a medical intern) from 1965 to 1966, teaching the Introduction to Modern Social Science. She then became a lecturer at Harvard University in 1967, lecturing on General Education. After becoming an assistant professor in the Harvard Graduate School of Education in 1971, she received tenure there in 1988 as a full professor. Gilligan taught for two years at the University of Cambridge (from 1992 to 1994) as the Pitt Professor of American History and Institutions and as a visiting professorial fellow in the Social and Political Sciences. In 1997, she became Patricia Albjerg Graham Chair in Gender Studies at Harvard. From 1998 until 2001, she was a Visiting Meyer Professor and later visiting professor at New York University School of Law.

Gilligan and Kristin Linklater co-founded an all-female theater group called the Company of Women in 1991. For the group, Linklater was the voice instructor. Around this time, Gilligan attended a Shakespeare & Company workshop on acting. Gilligan's theater work and gained knowledge on what "voice" really is led Tina Packer to ask Gilligan to draft a script for The Scarlet Letter.

In early fall of 2002, Gilligan released a theater adaptation of The Scarlet Letter, originally written by Nathaniel Hawthorne. Gilligan's son, Jonathan Gilligan, worked on writing the play with her. The play first opened on September 14, 2002, at Shakespeare & Company in Lenox, Massachusetts. While most of the story's content remained the same, Gilligan used the play as a vehicle to present many of the concepts on which she had been working. She related how the patriarchy not only maintains strict gender roles, but also how it prevents true pleasure in relationships between people. Gilligan said that Hawthorne was demonstrating that "you could overthrow kings, and still the tension between puritanical society and love and passion would continue". In Gilligan's adaption, she suggested that we have inherited Pearl's world where women do not necessarily have to worry about having an "A" on their breasts.

Gilligan eventually left Harvard in 2002 to join New York University as a full professor with the School of Education and the School of Law. She was a visiting professor at the University of Cambridge in the Centre for Gender Studies from 2003 until 2009.

Gilligan studied women's psychology and girls' development and co-authored or edited a number of texts with her students. She contributed the piece "Sisterhood Is Pleasurable: A Quiet Revolution in Psychology" to the 2003 anthology Sisterhood Is Forever: The Women's Anthology for a New Millennium, edited by Robin Morgan. She published her first novel, Kyra, in 2008. In 2015, Gilligan taught for a semester at New York University in Abu Dhabi.

== Psychology ==
Gilligan is known for her work with Lawrence Kohlberg on his stages of moral development as well as her criticism of his approach to the stages. As his research assistant, Gilligan argued that Kohlberg's stages were male-oriented, which limited their ability to be generalized to females. In an article where Gilligan revisited In a Different Voice, she commented:

I entered the conversation about women and morality in the late 1960s, a time in the U.S. that witnessed a convergence of the civil rights movement, the anti-war movement, the movement to stop atmospheric testing of nuclear weapons, the movement to end poverty, the women's movement, and the gay liberation movement. I was teaching at Harvard with Erik Erikson, a psychoanalyst working in the Freudian tradition, and Lawrence Kohlberg, a cognitive-developmental psychologist working in the tradition of Piaget. To all these men—Freud and Erikson, Piaget and Kohlberg—women appeared deficient in development.

Gilligan proposed her theory of stages of female moral development based on her idea of moral voices. According to Gilligan, there are two kinds of moral voices: that of the masculine and the feminine. The masculine voice is "logical and individualistic", meaning that the emphasis in moral decisions is protecting the rights of people and making sure justice is upheld. The feminine voice places more emphasis on protecting interpersonal relationships and taking care of other people. This voice focuses on the "care perspective", which means focusing on the needs of the individual in order to make an ethical decision. For Gilligan, Kohlberg's stages of moral development were emphasizing the masculine voice, making it difficult to accurately gauge a woman's moral development because of this incongruity in voices. Gilligan argues that androgyny, or integrating the masculine and the feminine, is the best way to realize one's potential as a human. Gilligan's stages of female moral development has been shown in business settings as an explanation to the different ways men and women handle ethical issues in the workplace as well.

Gilligan developed her own stages of moral development with the idea that women make moral and ethical decisions based on how they will affect others in mind. She followed Kohlberg's stages of preconventional, conventional, and postconventional morality, but she based these upon her research with women rather than men, a major advance in psychological theory. These three stages also have two transitions between the three steps of morality.

The first stage is pre-conventional morality. This stage revolves around self-interest and survival. When a conflict arises between the needs of oneself and the needs of others, a woman will choose her own needs first. Transition number one states that during this transition, a woman realizes her responsibility for others and that she could have previously been thinking selfishly. The second stage of three is conventional morality. This stage revolves around being selfless and prioritizing care for others. A woman realizes the needs of others and cares for them over herself, leading to self-sacrifice. After the second stage is the second of the two transitions. Transition two states that during the second transition, a woman realizes her needs are just as important as the needs of others. She realizes she must balance the needs of herself and the needs of others. This is a shift from "goodness" to "truth" as she honestly assesses the needs of each, not just as a responsibility. Finally, the third stage is post-conventional morality. This stage involves women paying attention to how their actions affect others, and taking responsibility for those consequences, good and bad. Women also take control of their own lives and show strong care for others. Here, a woman realizes the needs of herself are just as important as the needs of others, thus leading to the universal ethic of care and concern.

In a Different Voice goes deeper into Gilligan's criticism of Kohlberg and the stages of moral development of women, and was one of the accomplishments that put her at the forefront of the feminist movement.

== Philosophy ==
As a feminist, Gilligan has many works on women, especially girls during the time of adolescence. The following works are a few of her most notable pieces.

=== In a Different Voice ===
After entering the dialogue regarding women and morality in the 1960s, Gilligan published what is considered one of her most influential works in 1982. Before she conducted her research Gilligan knew that "psychologists had assumed a culture in which men were the measure of humanity, and autonomy and rationality ('masculine' qualities) were the markers of maturity. It was a culture that counted on women not speaking for themselves". She wanted there to be an opportunity for women to speak up since the nature of psychology led people to believe women had inferior qualities. To explore this theory further, Gilligan conducted her research using an interview method. Her questions centered around the self, morality and how women handle issues of conflict and choice. Her three studies that she references throughout the work were the college student study (moral development), the abortion decision study (experience of conflict), and the rights and responsibilities study (concepts of self and morality across men and women of different ages). From these studies Gilligan formed the framework for her ethics of care.

Gilligan also makes commentary on how current theory did not apply as easily when looking at a woman's perspective. She uses Freud as her first example, as he relied on "the imagery of men's lives in charting the course of human growth." Yet in doing so, Freud struggled to apply his work to the experiences of women as well. Gilligan continues to target this absence of the feminist perspective by look at a scenario involving two adolescent children. By using Kohlberg's six stages of moral development, Gilligan attempts to analyze both the boy and girl's answers to the question of whether a man should steal medicine to save his wife. Gilligan realizes that the girl's responses seem to place her a whole stage lower in maturity than the boy. However, Gilligan argues that this is a result of the children seeing two different moral problems. The boy sees this as a problem of logic whereas the girl seems to see this as a problem of human relationships. Gilligan points out that Kohlberg's explanation gives reason for why the boy's perspective is more mature, but gives no reason why the girl's perspective may be just as mature in other ways, suggesting the Kohlberg's system does not apply to all. In conducting a second interview between two new participants of the opposite gender, she finds similar results where the girl sees the situation less in terms of logic, but more in terms of a web of human relationships. Gilligan concludes this section saying how Freud is not necessarily correct in saying that girls have an intensification of narcissism during puberty, but that they develop a deeper perspective of care and "a new responsiveness to the self".

Furthermore, Gilligan introduces In a Different Voice by explaining that "the different voice I describe is characterized not by gender but theme. Its association with women is an empirical observation, and is primarily through women's voices that I trace its development. But this association is not absolute and the contrasts between male and female voices are presented here to highlight a distinction between two modes of thought and to focus on a problem of interpretation rather than to represent a generalization about either sex." Regardless of the findings Gilligan made from her study, her ethics of care and the fuel for her study have called future researchers to broaden the scope of studies and consider intersectionality more as well.

As of 2022, In a Different Voice had been translated into 20 different languages and sold over 700,000 copies.

==== Theory ====
In her book In a Different Voice Gilligan presented her ethics of care theory as an alternative to Lawrence Kohlberg's hierarchal and principled approach to ethics. In contrast to Kohlberg, who claimed that girls, and therefore also women, did not in general develop their moral abilities to the highest levels, Gilligan argued that women approached ethical problems differently from men. According to Gilligan, women's moral viewpoints center around the understanding of responsibilities and relationship whilst men's moral viewpoints instead center around the understanding of moral fairness, which is tied to rights and rules. Women also tend to see moral issues as a problem of conflicting responsibilities rather than competing rights. So whilst women perceive the situation as more contextual and narrative, men define the situation as more formal and abstract. In her 2011 article about In a Different Voice, Gilligan says she has made "a distinction [she] ha[s] come to see as pivotal to understanding care ethics. Within a patriarchal framework, care is a feminine ethic. Within a democratic framework, care is a human ethic. A feminist ethic of care is a different voice within a patriarchal culture because it joins reason with emotion, mind with body, self with relationships, men with women, resisting the divisions that maintain a patriarchal order". She calls the different moral approaches "ethics of care" and "ethics of justice" and recognizes them as fundamentally incompatible.

==== Criticism ====
Her ethics of care have been criticized by other feminist scholars such as Jaclyn Friedman, who argues that the different ethics of women and men are in fact a result of societal expectations. Since society expects women and men to think differently about ethics, women and men as a result do present differences. The different modes of reasoning are therefore a socially constructed dichotomy simply reproducing itself through our expectations of how women and men act. Christina Hoff Sommers argued that Gilligan's research is ill-founded and that no evidence exists to support her conclusion.

Dennis M. Senchuk makes a different critique of Gilligan's work, saying she uses hypothetical dilemmas in her theory. Senchuk thinks that Gilligan is unwilling to agree to Kohlberg's ideas because she does not agree with the reasoning on males, resulting in the exaggeration of the differences between males and females. Senchuk also notes the similarities between Gilligan's theory and Schopenhauer's misogyny. He recommends that her theory should be "extended – by the imagination – beyond the here and now" and not be restricted to the current network of personal relationships.

=== The Birth of Pleasure: A New Map of Love ===
In The Birth of Pleasure, Gilligan tests her concepts of what the best way is to find love through the historical stories of Adam and Eve, Cupid, Anne Frank, and the doomed love of Almasy and Katherine in The English Patient. Gilligan writes about why humans experience so much pain before finding pleasure in love. Gilligan considers the power of love and how it upsets the order of things. Throughout her book she wonders, what is the best way to find love?

In Marilyn N. Metzl's book review on The Birth of Pleasure, she says:

Gilligan's book traces love's path as she studies children's communication and couples in crisis, and argues persuasively that a child's inborn ability to love freely and live authentically becomes inhibited by patriarchal structure. Gilligan demonstrates how parents and patriarchal culture reinforces the loss of voice in girls while simultaneously forcing and shaming sons into masculine behavior characterized by assertion and aggression. Girls or boys who challenge this system and assume the role of the opposite sex are severely punished by the culture.

=== Meeting at the Crossroads: Women's Psychology and Girls' Development ===
Gilligan co-wrote Meeting at Crossroads with Mikel Brown to discuss the path for girls during adolescence. In their book, they conduct research on 100 girls who were going through adolescence. They studied the feelings and thoughts of the girls who enter adolescence and offer insights into girls' development and women's psychology.

Gilligan and Brown explore the heightened psychological risks of girls going through adolescence. By conducting a five-year study of girls, starting at age 12, Gilligan and Brown observe the psychological development of these girls. These problems have been seen as central to the psychology of women and their development.

=== Women, Girls and Psychotherapy: Reframing Resistance ===
Gilligan, Annie G. Rogers, and Deborah L. Tolman worked together to produce Women, Girls, and Psychotherapy: Reframing Resistance. In the book, Gilligan, Rogers, and Tolman examine the needs of adolescent teenage girls. This book looks at the behavior of girls, especially their resistance, to find it used as a political strategy and a health-sustaining process.

=== Making Connections: The Relational Worlds of Adolescent Girls at Emma Willard School ===
Gilligan, Nona P. Lyons, and Trudy J. Hanmer wrote Making Connections: The Relational Worlds at Emma Willard School. Lyons is a director of the Teacher Education Program at Brown University. Hanmer is the associate principal at Emma Willard School. The three women put together their different expertise to write about how adolescence is a critical time in girls lives — a time when "girls are in danger of losing their voices and thus losing connection with others". Girls connections with others links to the psychology of women and the nature of relationships. This book discusses girls connections and relationships, while simultaneously examining women's silences.

This book includes the voices of girls in adolescence to further examine their ideas of self, relationship, and morality, which are all crucial to the psychology of human development. Each story helps illuminate the questions that arose during the research.

=== Mapping the Moral Domain: A Contribution of Women's Thinking to Psychological Theory ===
Gilligan, Janie Victoria Ward, Betty Bardige, and Jill McLean Taylor write Mapping the Moral Domain to expand the theoretical base of Gilligan's novel In a Different Voice. The authors contrast the different way men and women speak about their relationship with evidence that suggests the different meanings of connection, dependence, autonomy, responsibility, loyalty, peer pressure, and violence. The authors map moral domain with the emphasis of including women's voices for developmental psychology and education for both men and women. This book is a contribution of women's thinking to psychology theory and education.

In Gilligan's previous book, In a Different Voice, Gilligan called the two different perspectives "gender specific". With her three colleagues in this book, they soften the term to "gender related". They say that each sex can answer moral dilemmas through the other gender's perspective.

== Personal life ==
Carol Gilligan is married to psychiatrist James Gilligan, M.D., who directed the Center for the Study of Violence at Harvard Medical School.

The Gilligans raised three children: Jonathan, Timothy, and Christopher. Jonathan Gilligan is a professor of Earth and Environmental Sciences and professor of Civil and Environmental Engineering at Vanderbilt University. Jonathan has also collaborated with their mother, to write the play The Scarlet Letter (a feminist adaptation of Hawthorne's novel) and the libretto for the opera Pearl. Timothy Gilligan is the vice-chair for education and associate professor of medicine at the Cleveland Clinic Taussig Cancer Institute. Christopher Gilligan is the Associate Chief Medical Officer of Brigham and Women's Hospital and Director of the Brigham and Women's Spine Center.

== Awards and honors ==
- 1984: Ms. Woman of the Year
- 1992: Grawemeyer Award for contributions to education
- 1996: Time magazine 25 most influential people in the United States
- 1998: Heinz Award for contributions to understanding the human condition
- Senior Research Scholar Award from the Spencer Foundation
- 2025: Kyoto Prize in the category "Arts and Philosophy".

=== Honorary degrees ===
Gilligan has received the following honorary degrees:

- Regis College, 1983
- Swarthmore College, 1985
- Haverford College, 1987
- Fitchburg State College, 1989
- Wesleyan University, 1992
- Massachusetts School of Professional Psychology, 1996
- Northeastern University, 1997
- Smith College, 1999
- University of Haifa, 2006
- John Jay College, 2006
- Mount Holyoke, 2008

== Works ==
=== Books ===
- Gilligan, Carol (1982). In a Different Voice: Psychological Theory and Women's Development. Cambridge, Massachusetts: Harvard University Press. ISBN 9780674445444.
- Gilligan, Carol (1989). Mapping the moral domain: a contribution of women's thinking to psychological theory and education. Cambridge, Massachusetts: Harvard University Press. ISBN 9780674548312.
- Gilligan, Carol; et al. (1990). Making connections: the relational worlds of adolescent girls at Emma Willard School. Cambridge, Massachusetts: Harvard University Press. ISBN 9780674540415.
- Gilligan, Carol; Brown, Lyn M. (1992). Meeting at the crossroads: women's psychology and girls' development. Cambridge, Massachusetts: Harvard University Press. ISBN 9780674564640.
- Gilligan, Carol; McLean Taylor, Jill; Sullivan, Amy M. (1997). Between voice and silence: women and girls, race and relationships. Cambridge, Massachusetts: Harvard University Press. ISBN 9780674068797.
- Gilligan, Carol (2002). The birth of pleasure. New York: Knopf. ISBN 9780679440376.
- Gilligan, Carol (2008). Kyra: a novel. New York: Random House. ISBN 9781400061754.
- Gilligan, Carol; Richards, David A.J. (2009). The deepening darkness: patriarchy, resistance, & democracy's future. Cambridge New York: Cambridge University Press. ISBN 9780521898980.
- Gilligan, Carol (2011). Joining the resistance. Cambridge, UK Malden, Massachusetts: Polity Press. ISBN 9780745651705.
- Gilligan, Carol; Gilligan, John (2011). The Scarlet Letter. Prime Stage Theatre.

From the novel The Scarlet Letter by Nathaniel Hawthorne. Co-written with her son Jonathan and produced by Prime Stage Theatre in November 2011.
Educational fact sheet about the play.

- Gilligan, Carol; Hochschild, Arlie; Tronto, Joan (2013). Contre l'indifférence des privilégiés: à quoi sert le care (in French). Paris: Payot. ISBN 9782228908771. Details.
- Gilligan, Carol; Rogers, Annie G; Tolman, Deborah L (2014–02–04). "Women, Girls & Psychotherapy". doi:10.4324/9781315801346.
- Gilligan, Carol; Richards, David A.J. (2018) Darkness now visible: patriarchy's resurgence and feminist resistance. Cambridge: Cambridge University Press. ISBN 9781108470650.
- Gilligan, Carol; Snider, Naomi. (2018). Why does patriarchy persist? Cambridge: Polity Press. ISBN 9781509529131.
- Gilligan, Carol; (2023).In a Human Voice. Cambridge: Polity Press ISBN 9781509556809.
- Gilligan, Carol (2026) Solstice. Random House. ISBN 978-1-4000-6176-1.

=== Book chapters ===
- Gilligan, Carol (1997), "Woman's place in man's life cycle", in Nicholson, Linda (ed.), The second wave: a reader in feminist theory, New York: Routledge, pp. 198–215, ISBN 9780415917612.

=== Articles ===
- Gilligan, Carol (2006). "When the mind leaves the body... and returns". Daedalus (Cambridge, Mass.). 135: 55. ISSN 0011-5266.
- Gilligan, Carol. "From In a Different Voice to The Birth of Pleasure: An Intellectual Journey". North Dakota Law Review. 81: 729. ISSN 0029-2745.
- Gilligan, Carol (2004–06). "Knowing and not knowing: reflections on manhood". Psychotherapy and Politics International. 2 (2): 99–114. doi:10.1002/ppi.76. ISSN 1476-9263.
