= Feminist Philosophy Quarterly =

- Discipline: Philosophy
- Language: English
- Edited by: Samantha Brennan, Carla Fehr, Alice MacLachlan, Kathryn Norlock

Publication details
- History: 2015–present
- Frequency: Quarterly
- Open access: Yes

Standard abbreviations
- ISO 4: Fem. Philos. Q.

Indexing
- ISSN: 2371-2570

Links
- Journal homepage

Feminist Philosophy Quarterly (FPQ) is an online, open access, peer-reviewed journal dedicated to promoting feminist philosophical scholarship. Founded on 22 July 2015, the journal is published quarterly and strives to include and incorporate the entirety of feminist philosophy across the world and including different traditions. The editors-in-chief are Samantha Brennan, Carla Fehr, Alice MacLachlan, and Kathryn Norlock; Brennan also served as a co-founder of the journal.

The journal aims to enhance feminist philosophers' and women's position in the philosophical sphere and the world at large, as well as being a platform for philosophical research that engages the issues faced by wider society. FPQ prioritises aligning itself with people who work towards fighting oppression and achieving equality and fairness.

Taking issues of bias in publication seriously, FPQ has a triple-anonymous review policy. This means that authors, editors, and reviewers are all anonymous to one another. In addition to publishing peer-reviewed scholarly articles, the journal also publishes a variety of invited and submitted symposia.

FPQ's online platform is hosted by Digital Commons (powered by bepress) at Scholarship at Western, in turn by Western University.
