= Rhonda Phillips =

American academic administrator

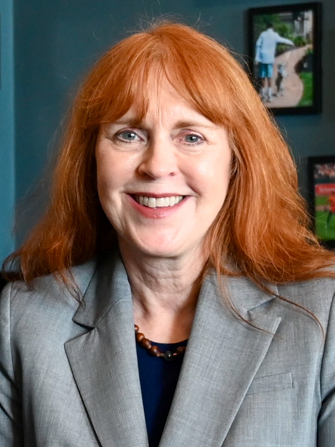
- Phillips in 2025

8th President of St. Mary's College of Maryland
- Incumbent
- Assumed office July 1, 2025
- Preceded by: Tuajuanda C. Jordan

20th President of Chatham University
- In office April 18, 2023 – June 1, 2025
- Preceded by: David Finegold
- Succeeded by: Lisa Lambert (interim)

Personal details
- Born: Mississippi, U.S.
- Education: University of Southern Mississippi; Georgia Institute of Technology

Rhonda Phillips is an American academic administrator and economic development expert serving as the eighth president of St. Mary's College of Maryland. She was previously the twentieth president of Chatham University from 2023 to 2025, the inaugural dean of Purdue University Honors College, and a professor of agricultural economics from 2013 to 2023.

== Life ==
Phillips was raised in Santee near Bassfield, Mississippi. She earned a bachelor's degree (1983) in geography and master's degree (1986) in economic development from the University of Southern Mississippi (USM). She completed a master's degree (1992) in economics and a Ph.D. in city and regional planning from Georgia Tech in 1996.

Phillips is an economic development and sustainability expert. Phillips was the associate director for economic development at the Atlanta Chamber of Commerce. She worked at the University of Florida and USM. At the Arizona State University (ASU), Phillips served as the associate dean for Barrett, The Honors College and was a professor and director of the school of community resources and development. She was also a senior sustainability scientist at the ASU Julie Ann Wrigley Global Institute of Sustainability.

In 2013, Phillips joined Purdue University as the inaugural dean of the John Martinson Honors College and a professor of agricultural economics. She was a finalist for the presidency of College of Charleston in 2018 and New College of Florida in 2021. On April 18, 2023, she was named the twentieth president of Chatham University, succeeding David Finegold. On April 28, 2025, it was announced that Phillips would become the president of St. Mary's College of Maryland, starting July 1, 2025. Phillips stepped down as the president of Chatham University on June 1, 2025, and was succeeded in interim by Lisa Lambert.
