= M. A. Fitzsimons =

American historian

- Born: Matthew Anthony Fitzsimons; 1912; New York City, New York, United States
- Died: October 24, 1992 (aged 79–80)
- Education: Columbia University (BA); University of Oxford (MA); University of Chicago (PhD)
- Occupation: Historian
- Employer: University of Notre Dame
- Known for: Editor of The Review of Politics

Matthew Anthony Fitzsimons (1912 – October 24, 1992) was an American historian. He was a professor at the University of Notre Dame and was the longtime editor of The Review of Politics.

== Biography ==
Fitzsimons was a native of New York City. He earned an A.B. from Columbia University in 1934, and earned a two-year scholarship to the University of Oxford. He joined the faculty of the University of Notre Dame in 1937 and earned a doctorate from the University of Chicago in English history. He wrote extensively about English history, historiography, history of the Catholic Church and religious orders.

Fitzsimons was a close colleague and succeeded historian Waldemar Gurian as editor of the journal Review of Politics from 1955 to 1974. He died on October 24, 1992.
