= Ruth Abbey =

Australian political theorist (born 1961)

- Born: 1961 (age 64–65)

Academic background
- Education: Monash University; McGill University
- Thesis: Descent & Dissent (1995)
- Doctoral advisor: Charles Taylor

Academic work
- Discipline: Political science
- Sub-discipline: Political theory
- School or tradition: Feminism
- Institutions: University of Notre Dame Australia; University of Kent; University of Notre Dame

Ruth Abbey (born 1961) is an Australian political theorist with interests in contemporary political theory, history of political thought, history of philosophy, and feminist political thought. She was a John Cardinal O'Hara, C.S.C. Associate Professor in the Department of Political Science of the University of Notre Dame.

== Work ==
=== Feminist liberalism ===
In The Return of Feminist Liberalism, Abbey examines a number of contemporary feminists who, notwithstanding decades of feminist critique, are unwilling to give up on liberalism. Her examination centres on the work of Martha Nussbaum, the late Susan Moller Okin (1946–2004) and the late Jean Hampton (1954–1996) all of whom situate themselves within the liberal tradition and outline well developed positions on the compatibility of feminism and liberalism.

Abbey examines why, and in what ways, each of them believes that liberalism contains the normative and political resources for the continuing improvement of women's situations. She asks whether they are cognizant of, and can reply to, the major criticisms of liberalism mounted by many feminists. Abbey also brings out and tries to explain and evaluate the differences among these three feminist-liberals, despite their shared allegiance to this tradition. Okin, Nussbaum and Hampton do not, however, represent a minority of three in their faith in liberalism, so in addition Abbey surveys the arguments made by other contemporary feminists who see some ongoing value in liberalism, eliciting both the promise they see for women in some of liberalism's ideas as well as demonstrating how liberalism itself can be made more robust by attending to women's concerns.

=== Nietzsche ===
At the core of Abbey's writings about Friedrich Nietzsche is a study of his middle period works, Human, All Too Human, Daybreak, and The Gay Science. Her analysis provides insights on Nietzsche's morality touching on issues such as friendship, gender, marriage, egoism, pity and politics. One reviewer, writing in The Review of Metaphysics, called Nietzsche’s Middle Period a "well researched...synopsis of Nietzsche's works from 1878 to 1882," the aim of which "is to defend the distinctiveness, as well as the 'superior worth', of this neglected phase of Nietzsche's development..."

Since 2003 she has managed an extensive online resource, supported by the University of Kent and the British Academy, for the works by and about Charles Taylor.

== Selected publications ==
=== Books ===
- Nietzsche's Middle Period (Oxford University Press, 2000).
- Charles Taylor (Princeton University Press and Acumen Press, UK, 2000).
- ed., Contemporary Philosophy in Focus: Charles Taylor (Cambridge University Press, 2004).
- The Return of Feminist Liberalism (Routledge, 2011).
- Feminist Interpretations of John Rawls (The Pennsylvania State University Press, 2013).

=== Articles ===
- "Rawlsian Resources for Animal Ethics." Ethics and the Environment Vol. 12, No. 1, Spring 2007.
- "Back Toward a Comprehensive Liberalism? Justice as Fairness, Gender and Families." Political Theory 2007.
- "Turning or Spinning? Charles Taylor's Catholicism." Contemporary Political Theory Vol. 5, No.2, May 2006.
- "Is Liberalism Now an Essentially Contested Concept?" New Political Science Vol. 27, No. 4, December 2005.
- "Recognizing Taylor Rightly: A Reply to Morag Patrick." Ethnicities 3 (1), March 2003, pp. 115–131.
- "Pluralism in Practice: The Political Thought of Charles Taylor." Critical Review of International Social and Political Philosophy Vol. 5, No. 3 (Autumn 2002).
- "The Articulated Life: An Interview with Charles Taylor." Reason in Practice Vol. 1, No.3, 2001.
- "The Chief Inducement? The Idea of Marriage as Friendship." co-authored with Douglas Den Uyl, Journal of Applied Philosophy, Vol. 18, No. 1, 2001.
- "The Roots of Ressentiment: Nietzsche on Vanity." New Nietzsche Studies Vol. 3, nos. 3& 4, Summer/Fall, 1999.
- "Back to the Future: Marriage as Friendship in the thought of Mary Wollstonecraft." Hypatia: A Journal of Feminist Philosophy 14, 3, Summer 1999.
- "Mediocrity versus Meritocracy: Nietzsche’s (Mis)reading of Chamfort." History of Political Thought Volume XIX, No. 3, Autumn 1998.
- "Nietzsche and the Will to Politics." co-authored with Fredrick Appel. Review of Politics Winter 1998 (January, Vol. 60:1).

== Honors and awards ==
- Leverhume Research Fellowship from the Leverhulme Trust (2004)
- Faculty Fellow (2008–2009), Center for Ethics and Public Affairs, The Murphy Institute
