= Satellite state =

Country which is nominally sovereign but under extensive influence from a larger state

A satellite state or dependent state is a country that is formally independent, but under heavy political, economic, and military influence or control from another country. The term was coined by analogy to planetary objects orbiting a larger object, such as smaller moons revolving around larger planets, and is used mainly to refer to Central and Eastern European member states of the Warsaw Pact during the Cold War, as well as to Mongolia and Tuva between 1924 and 1990, all of which were economically, culturally, and politically dominated by the Soviet Union. While primarily referring to the Soviet-controlled states in Central and Eastern Europe or Asia, in some contexts the term also refers to other countries under Soviet hegemony during the Cold War, such as North Korea (especially in the years surrounding the Korean War of 1950–1953), Cuba (particularly after it joined the Comecon in 1972), and some countries in the American sphere of influence, such as South Vietnam during 1964–1973. In Western usage, the term has seldom been applied to states other than those in the Soviet orbit. In Soviet usage, the term applied to states in the orbit of Nazi Germany, Fascist Italy, and Imperial Japan, whereas in the West the term to refer to those has typically been client states.

The Oxford English Dictionary traces the concept of satellite states in English back as early as 1780. In times of war or political tension, satellite states sometimes served as buffers between an enemy country and the nation exerting control over the satellites.

== Soviet satellite states ==
=== Interwar period ===
When the Mongolian Revolution of 1921 broke out, Mongolian revolutionaries expelled the Russian White Guards (during the Russian Civil War of 1917–1923 following the October Revolution of 1917) from Mongolia, with the assistance of the Soviet Red Army. The revolution also officially ended Manchurian sovereignty over Mongolia, which had existed since 1691. Although the theocratic Bogd Khanate of Mongolia still nominally continued, with successive series of violent struggles, Soviet influence grew stronger. In 1924, after the Bogd Khan died of laryngeal cancer or, as some sources suggest, at the hands of Soviet spies, the Mongolian People's Republic was proclaimed on November 26, 1924. A nominally independent and sovereign country, it has been described as being a satellite state of the Soviet Union in the years from 1924 until 1990. This is supported by the fact that the Mongolian PR collapsed less than two months after the dissolution of the Soviet Union.

During the Russian Civil War, Red Army troops occupied Tuva in January 1920, which had also been part of the Qing Empire of China and a protectorate of Imperial Russia. The Tuvan People's Republic was proclaimed a nominally independent state in 1921, although it was tightly controlled by Moscow and is considered a satellite state of the Soviet Union until 1944, when the USSR annexed it into the Russian SFSR.

Another early Soviet satellite state in Asia was the short-lived Far Eastern Republic in Siberia.

=== Post-World War II ===
At the end of World War II, most Eastern and Central European countries were occupied by the Soviet Union, and along with the Soviet Union made up what is called the Soviet empire. Soviet forces remained in these countries after the war's end. Through a series of coalition governments including communist parties, and then a forced liquidation of coalition members opposed by the Soviets, Stalinist systems were established in each country. Stalinists gained control of existing governments, police, press and radio outlets in these countries. Soviet satellite states of the Cold War included:

- (People's Socialist Republic of Albania) People's Republic of Albania (1946–1961)
- Polish People's Republic (1947–1989)
- People's Republic of Bulgaria (1946–1990)
- (Socialist Republic of Romania) Romanian People's Republic (1947–1965)
- Czechoslovak Socialist Republic (1948–1989)
- (East Germany) German Democratic Republic (1949–1990)
- Hungarian People's Republic (1949–1989)
- Mongolian People's Republic (1924–1990)
- (North Korea) Democratic People's Republic of Korea (1948–1956)
- Democratic Republic of Afghanistan (1978–1991)

Albania and Romania ceased to be satellites before the revolutions of 1989. The People's Socialist Republic of Albania, under the leadership of Enver Hoxha, broke ties with the Soviet Union in the Albanian–Soviet split following the Soviet de-Stalinisation process, and removed itself from Soviet influence in 1961. Romania's de-satellization process started in 1956 and ended by 1965, with serious economic disagreements with Moscow resulting in a final rejection of Soviet hegemony in 1964.

From 1945 to 1948 North Korea was under Soviet Civil Administration, following this provisional governments were established under the Provisional People's Committee of North Korea and People's Committee of North Korea resulting in the establishment of the Democratic People's Republic of Korea in 1948. Some scholars consider North Korea a satellite state under the Soviet Union from 1948 until the 1958 August faction incident.

The short-lived East Turkestan Republic (1944–1949) was a Soviet satellite until it was absorbed into the People's Republic of China. Between 1945 and the Iran crisis of 1946 the Azerbaijan People's Government and Republic of Mahabad existed as satellite states in Soviet-occupied Iran. The Democratic Republic of Afghanistan was a satellite regime of the Soviet Union from 1978 to 1991. Between 1979 and 1989, Afghanistan was also under Soviet military occupation.

== Post-Cold War usage of the term ==
Some commentators have expressed concern that United States military and diplomatic interventions in the Balkans, in the Middle East, and elsewhere might lead, or perhaps have already led, to the existence of American satellite states. William Pfaff warned that a permanent American presence in Iraq would "turn Iraq into an American satellite state". In the Asia-Pacific, John Pilger accused ex Australian Prime Minister John Howard of turning the country into America's 51st state and South Korea has regularly been described by North Korea for being a "puppet state" of the United States.

== See also ==
- American imperialism
- Banana republic
- Buffer state
- Client state
- Eastern Bloc
- Finlandisation
- Neo-colony
- Protectorate
- Puppet state
- Sister republic
- Soviet empire
- Suzerainty
- Vassal state
