= Kathryn Norlock =

American philosopher (born 1969)

Philosophical work
- Institutions: Trent University, St. Mary's College of Maryland, University of Wisconsin-Madison
- Main interests: Ethical theory, feminist philosophy, forgiveness

Kathryn Norlock (born 1969) is the inaugural Kenneth Mark Drain Endowed Chair in Ethics, the Chair of the Department of Philosophy, an affiliated faculty member in Sustainability Studies, and an associated faculty member in Gender and Women's Studies at Trent University.

In 2015, she co-founded Feminist Philosophy Quarterly, which is open access, peer-reviewed, and supported by the Social Sciences and Humanities Research Council of Canada. She continues as a co-editor as of 2025.

== Education and career ==
Norlock received a bachelor's in political science from Northern Illinois University in 1992, and earned her master's and doctorate in philosophy from the University of Wisconsin-Madison in 1999 and 2001, respectively.

Norlock was appointed the inaugural Kenneth Mark Drain Chair at Trent University in 2010, and served a term as chair of Trent's philosophy department starting 2012. Before coming to Trent, Norlock held appointments at St. Mary's College of Maryland from 2001 to 2010, and served as an instructor at the University of Wisconsin-Madison prior to that.

== Research areas ==
Norlock has written extensively on issues of forgiveness and reconciliation, especially related to issues surrounding gender, race, and environment. Her work on forgiveness is regarded as providing significant, innovative contributions to the field.

Norlock has written extensively on issues surrounding the importance of the retention of women and people of color in academia. She has also addressed environmental and sociopolitical issues from a feminist perspective.

Reflecting on her work, Norlock says, "Everything I write returns to the importance of the idea of a relational self to philosophy." She is also, as someone who characterizes herself as "happy with pessimism", interested in articulating what moral philosophy looks like in "a non-ideal context" and in general, understanding what non-ideal ethical theory is.

== Publications ==
Norlock has published one book, Forgiveness from a Feminist Perspective, which was released in 2009. She has contributed to a number of anthologies, including Evil, Political Violence, and Forgiveness, Ethics and the Family, and Forgiveness: Probing the Boundaries. She has also published articles in a number of peer-reviewed journals, including pieces in Hypatia: A Journal of Feminist Philosophy, the Journal of Environmental and Agricultural Ethics, and Ethics and the Environment.

=== Forgiveness from a Feminist Perspective ===
In Forgiveness from a Feminist Perspective, Norlock argues that there are significant gendered differences in practices of forgiveness, and that, furthermore, women are expected to practice forgiveness significantly more than men are (and that this is not an artifact of women being wronged more often than men.) She suggests that forgiveness has been historically and culturally feminized, and argues that earlier philosophers whose work focused on forgiveness made a critical misstep in overlooking this fact. She argues that the dominant philosophical approach to forgiveness - the Kantian model - is significantly flawed because it assumes the parties involved are individualistic, rationally self-interested, and autonomous. Norlock also heavily criticizes the binary that many theorists of forgiveness postulate between "true" forgiveness and "false" forgiveness, arguing that theorists arrive at these binaries by failing to take a relational approach to understanding forgiveness (by failing to take in to account the histories and contexts within which people forgive.) Norlock suggests that standard approaches to forgiveness represent a triple disservice to women by first replicating the assumption that women forgive more often than men, refusing to accept as valid many of the reasons that women may practice forgiveness, and failing to recognize that asymmetrical relations of gendered power have meaningful effects on practices of forgiveness.

In place of the traditional narrative of forgiveness, Norlock suggests a feminist alternative. Such an alternative would recognize that potential forgivers are significantly shaped by the relations and contexts in which they act, acknowledge the legitimacy of anger and recognize that this complicates forgiveness, and would take seriously the actual lived experiences of people, even when they conflict with theoretical models. Norlock suggests that forgiveness involves two distinct elements: the decision to adopt a new attitude towards someone who has wronged you that absolves them in part from the fullness of their guilt, and secondly actually conveying this decision to the party that has wronged you.

Norlock's focus on the importance of relationality in understanding forgiveness represents an important difference between Norlock and prior theorists of forgiveness; she is the first philosopher to provide an in-depth examination of the importance of relationality in understanding forgiveness. Norlock also argues that in situations where the wronged individual has power over the wrong-doer, the wronged individual has a greater obligation to practice forgiveness than in other situations - an argument that posits forgiveness as an active exercise of power rather than a passive virtue, something that distinguishes her from most other theorists.
