= Tom Everhart =

American artist

- Born: May 21, 1952 (age 74); Washington, D.C., United States
- Known for: Illustration, painting

Tom Everhart (born May 21, 1952, in Washington, D.C.) is an American artist. His work often involves bright color, splattered paint, and characters from the Peanuts comic strip. Everhart collaborated with Charles Schultz, the strip's creator, after they met in 1980. He is the only visual artist with legal permission from Schultz to use the Peanuts characters.

== Early life and education ==
Everhart began his undergraduate studies at the Yale School of Art and Architecture in 1970. In 1972 he participated in an independent study program under Earl Hoffman at St. Mary's College. He returned to the Yale School of Art and Architecture in 1974 where he completed his graduate work in 1976, followed by postgraduate studies at the Musée de l'Orangerie, in Paris.

== Career ==
Everhart taught Life Drawing and Painting, briefly from 1979 to 1980, at Antioch College.

In 1980, he was introduced to cartoonist Charles M. Schulz at Schulz's studios in Santa Rosa, California. A few weeks prior to their meeting, Everhart, having absolutely no education in cartooning, found himself involved in a freelance project that required him to draw and present Peanuts renderings to Schulz's studios. Preparing as he would the drawings and studies for his large-scale skeleton/nature-related paintings, he blew up some of the cartoonist's strips on a twenty-five foot wall in his studio, which eliminated the perimeter lines of the cartoon box, and left only the marks of the cartoonist. Schulz's painterly pen-strokes - now, larger than life - were translated into painterly brush-strokes: they were now in a language that overwhelmingly connected to Everhart's own form of expression and communication. Completely impressed with Schulz's line, he was able to reproduce the line art almost exactly. This, in turn, impressed Schulz at their meeting. It was at this time that Everhart affirmed his obsession with Schulz's line art style, and began their ongoing relationship of friendship and line style education.

A few years later, while still painting full-time on his previous body of work in his studio, Everhart began drawing special projects for Schulz and United Media, both in New York City and Tokyo. These authentic Schulz-style drawings included covers and interiors of magazines, art for the White House, and the majority of the MetLife campaign. When Everhart was not painting, he was now considered to be the only fine artist authorized and educated by Schulz to draw the actual Schulz line.

The paintings using Schulz's comic strip, Peanuts, as subject matter began and replaced the skeleton and nature-related paintings in 1988. The inspiration came to Everhart in Johns Hopkins Hospital, where he was undergoing several operations for stage 4 colon / liver cancer in the summer of 1988. Everhart recalls lying in a hospital bed surrounded by enough flowers to open a florist shop, piles of art books and a stack of Peanuts comic strips sent to him by Schulz. The light streaming in from the window almost projected the new images of his future Schulz inspired paintings on the wall. All the images in Everhart's work are in some respect derived from Schulz's Peanuts comic strip.

In January 1990, Everhart's Schulz-related work went on to show at The Louvre in Paris and subsequently in Los Angeles at the L.A. County Museum of Natural History, Montreal at the Museum of Fine Arts, Tokyo, Japan at the Suntory Museum of Art, Osaka, Rome, Venice, Milan, Minneapolis, Baltimore, New York City, Houston, Chicago, Las Vegas, and in Santa Rosa, California at the Charles M. Schulz Museum.

In 1991, Schulz and United Media drafted a legal agreement to allow Everhart to use subject matter from Schulz's Peanuts strip in his art for "the term of his life".

In 1992, Pigpen's Dirtballs, a 72" x 128" painting, was filmed with the artist in progress for the unaired CBS special "The Fabulous Funnies". A series of four lithographs were published in 1996 and a series of four more lithographs entitled, To Every Dog There Is A Season followed in 1997. Over the next ten years S2 Art editions and Tom Everhart would create an astonishing body of lithography work consisting of over seventy-four lithographs.

In 1997, Snoopy, Not Your Average Dog, published by HarperCollins, featured an essay and reproductions of Tom Everhart's Schulz-inspired paintings.

An agreement, with Everhart, United Feature Syndicate and Peanuts creator Charles M. Schulz, was signed, in 1997, to grant to third parties licenses with respect to the Schulz inspired paintings to produce up-scale museum-type products, and continues in effect to present, with Iconix replacing United Media in 2010.

In 2000, his first solo museum show was launched at the Suntory Museum of Art in Tokyo and Osaka, Japan. The exhibition traveled to five other locations in Japan until the year 2002.

CBS, in a Charles M. Schulz tribute, designed an entire sound stage, composed solely of Everhart's paintings. The paintings were used with host Whoopi Goldberg throughout the hour-long special, in May 2000.

After Charles Schulz died in February 2000 it left Everhart with a deep sense of loss as well as an even stronger desire to communicate the incredible gift bestowed on him by Schulz.

Thus, in 2000 Everhart discovered French Polynesia, a small group of islands in the center of the Pacific Ocean. The ongoing trips between French Polynesia and Venice, California have had a significant effect on the paintings most easily observed in the luminous color palette. But, most importantly, it offered him a new way of seeing the work that he was dedicated to continuing.

The Charles M. Schulz Museum opened in August 2002 and the following year November 14, 2003 Everhart had the honor of presenting his works in a solo exhibition titled "Under The Influence". He would also be included in the museum's 2011 Pop'd From The Panel exhibition along with Warhol and Lichtenstein.

In 2004 Everhart showed a group of nine large scaled paintings titled Dots Dogs Drips with the S2 Art Gallery in Chicago that then traveled to Osaka and Tokyo in 2005.

For the next two years, Everhart worked to produce two large bodies of works on paper, canvas, and wood. The first exhibition titled Cracking Up consisted of seventy-five artworks. The following exhibition Boom Shaka Laka Laka: The Lagoon Paintings was made up of three large scale paintings and one hundred fourteen works on paper ranging in sizes for 10" x 12" to 40" x 60". Both bodies of work were shown at the Jack Gallery.

In 2011 he exhibited 97 works, titled "Crashing The Party", a solo exhibition at the Animazing Gallery in New York.

Everhart continues to lecture around the world on the artwork of Charles M. Schulz and to communicate about the collaborative relationship they shared, as a cartoonist and a painter.

After living in San Francisco, Paris, New York City, Washington D.C., Baltimore, and London, in 1997, Everhart moved to Venice, Los Angeles, California where he now lives with Jennifer, his wife and director of their studio.

Today, Everhart is the only fine artist educated by Schulz and legally authorized by both Charles Schulz and Iconix Brand Group to use subject matter from Schulz's Peanuts strip to create fine art.
