= Samantha Brennan =

British-born philosopher (born 1964)

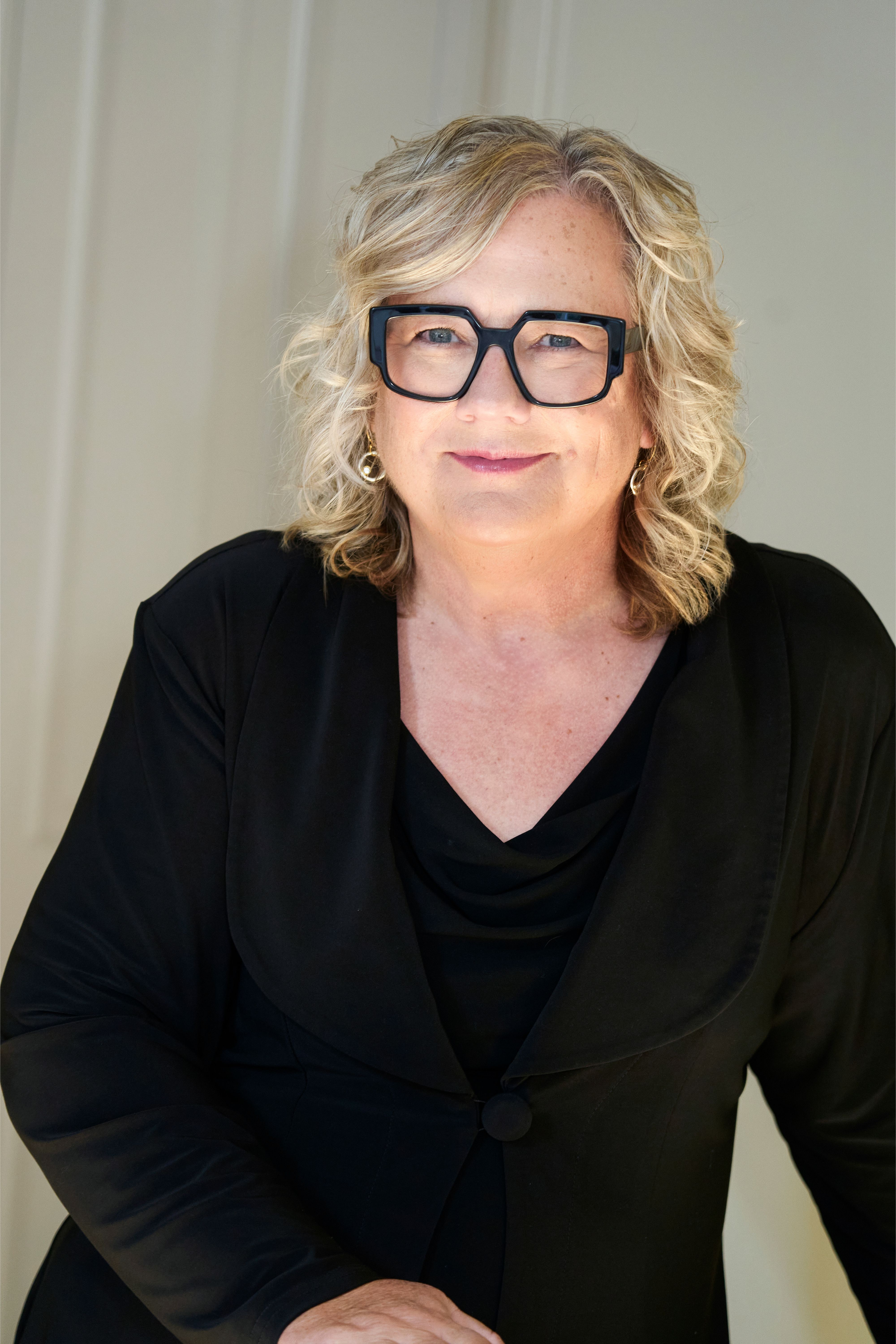
- Brennan in 2025
- Born: 1964 (age 61–62); Lancashire, England
- Other name: Samantha Jane Brennan

Academic background
- Education: Dalhousie University; University of Illinois at Chicago
- Thesis: Thresholds for Rights
- Doctoral advisor: Shelly Kagan

Academic work
- Discipline: Philosophy; women's studies
- School or tradition: Feminist philosophy
- Institutions: University of Western Ontario; University of Guelph

Samantha Jane Brennan (born 1964) is a British-born philosopher and scholar of women's studies who is currently dean of the College of Arts and faculty member in the Department of Philosophy at the University of Guelph. She was previously a professor in the Department of Women's Studies and Feminist Research at Western University, Canada. Brennan was Department Chair of Philosophy at Western from 2002 to 2007, and 2008–2011. She is a past president of the Canadian Philosophical Association (2017–18).

== Education and career ==
Brennan received her BA in philosophy from Dalhousie University, Halifax, Nova Scotia, and her PhD from the University of Illinois at Chicago, where she wrote her dissertation, Thresholds for Rights, under the supervision of Shelly Kagan. Brennan grew up on the east coast of Canada, living in Newfoundland, New Brunswick, and Nova Scotia. She was born in Lancashire, England.

Brennan has been a Visiting Faculty Fellow in Philosophy, RSSS, the Australian National University and a Taylor Fellow in Philosophy and a visiting fellow in bioethics at the University of Otago in Dunedin, New Zealand.

Brennan co-founded Feminist Philosophy Quarterly, an online, open access, peer-reviewed journal dedicated to promoting feminist philosophical scholarship.

In 2018 Brennan began a new position as Dean of the College of Arts at the University of Guelph.

== Research interests ==
Brennan's research focuses on contemporary normative ethics, applied ethics, political philosophy, and feminist philosophy. In work on children's rights and family justice, Brennan argues that adults should enter into parenting contracts rather than marriage contracts. In normative ethics, Brennan has developed a moderate deontological account according to which rights can be overridden on the basis of the amount of good that can be brought about by doing so. Brennan has also published on the topics of gender identity and fashion, bioethics, philosophy of sport, the moral significance of death, and on feminist approaches to fitness.
