= Shelly Kagan =

American philosopher (born 1954)

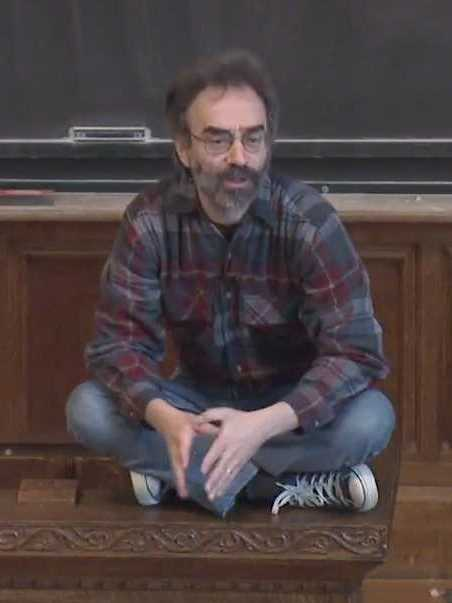
- Born: Shelly Ian Kagan; 1954 (age 71–72); Skokie, Illinois, US

Academic background
- Education: Wesleyan University; Princeton University
- Thesis: The Limits of Morality
- Doctoral advisor: Thomas Nagel

Academic work
- Discipline: Philosophy
- Sub-discipline: Moral philosophy; social philosophy; political philosophy
- Institutions: University of Pittsburgh; University of Illinois at Chicago; Yale University
- Doctoral students: Samantha Brennan
- Main interests: Animal ethics; desert; death
- Influenced: Derek Parfit
- Website: campuspress.yale.edu/shellykagan

Shelly Ian Kagan (/ˈkeɪɡən/; born 1954) is an American philosopher. He is the Clark Professor of Philosophy at Yale University, where he has taught since 1995. He is best known for his writings about animal ethics, moral philosophy, normative ethics, and philosophy of death. In 2007, Kagan's course about death was offered for free online, and was very popular. This led him to publish a book on the subject in 2012. Kagan was elected to the American Academy of Arts and Sciences in 2016.

== Education and career ==
Born in Skokie, Illinois, Kagan received his B.A. from Wesleyan University in 1976 and his Ph.D. from Princeton University in 1982. He taught at the University of Pittsburgh from 1981 until 1986, and at the University of Illinois at Chicago from 1986 until 1995, before taking a position at Yale.

Kagan has served as a member of the editorial board of the journal Ethics. In 2016, he was made a fellow of the American Academy of Arts and Sciences.

== Philosophical work ==
In his 1984 book Reasons and Persons, Derek Parfit credited Kagan as the "person from whom I have learnt the most", noting that Kagan's comments on his draft were half the length of the draft itself.

In 1989, Kagan's first book, The Limits of Morality, was published. It is an extended critique of two key assumptions underlying what Kagan calls "ordinary morality": the "common‐sense moral view that most of us accept". Specifically, the book questions the assumption that morality rules out certain actions (such as harming innocent people) even in situations where doing so might create greater good, and the assumption that we are "not required to make our greatest possible contribution to the overall good". According to Kagan, these two assumptions are indefensible, despite their widespread appeal.

In 1997, Kagan published a textbook, Normative Ethics, designed to provide a thorough introduction to the subject for upper-level undergraduate or graduate students. In 2007, his Yale course "Death" was recorded for Open Yale Courses, and his book Death is based on these lectures. In 2010, Yale University reported that Kagan's "Death" course had made him one of the most popular foreign teachers in China.

Kagan also explored desert, the concept of what people deserve, in his 2012 book The Geometry of Desert. According to Kagan, people differ in terms of how morally deserving they are and it is good for people to get what they deserve. The book attempts to reveal the hidden complexity of moral desert.

Kagan debated the topic "Is God necessary for Morality" with analytic philosopher, theologian and Christian apologist William Lane Craig at Columbia University.

=== Animal ethics ===
Kagan published How to Count Animals, More or Less in 2019. Against a utilitarian viewpoint, Kagan argues for a hierarchical position of animal ethics where people count more than animals, and some animals count more than others. He ranks creatures by sentience and assign them different moral weights based on their interests.

He has defended modal personism over speciesism. On modal personism, a being's potential to become a person can be a source of moral status. Persons possess a higher moral status than nonhuman animals or beings that could never become persons.

In 2023, Kagan said, "It turns out fish are far more intelligent than I've ever given them credit for. So when I combined that with my moral views on why you should not eat beef, pork, chicken—suddenly, I had to give up fish. So I gave up fish".

== Bibliography ==
- The Limits of Morality, Oxford University Press, 1989. ISBN 0-19-823916-5.
- Normative Ethics, Westview Press, 1997. ISBN 0-8133-0846-1.
- Death, Yale University Press, 2012. ISBN 978-0-300-18084-8.
- The Geometry of Desert, Oxford University Press, August 2012. ISBN 0199895597.
- How to Count Animals, more or less, Oxford University Press, April 2019. ISBN 9780198829676.
- Answering Moral Skepticism, Oxford University Press, October 2023. ISBN 9780197688977.

== See also ==
- American philosophy
- List of American philosophers
