= Tuajuanda C. Jordan =

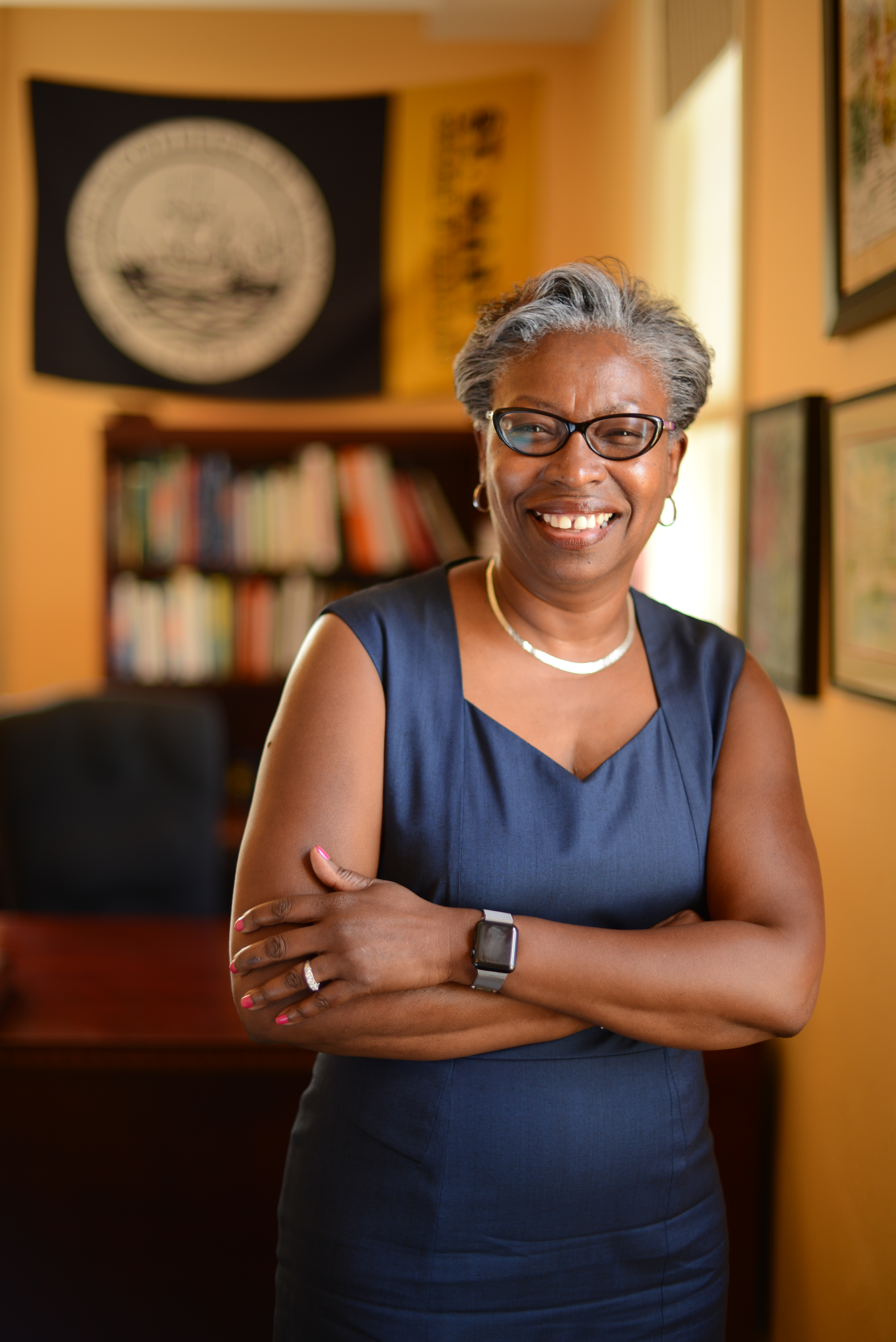
- Jordan in her office

Tuajuanda C. Jordan is an American academic administrator who served as the seventh president of St. Mary’s College of Maryland from 2014 to 2025.

== Career ==
Prior to joining St. Mary’s College, Jordan also held a number of leadership positions in higher education, including dean of the College of Arts and Sciences and professor of chemistry at Lewis & Clark College in Oregon, and associate dean in the College of Arts and Sciences at Xavier University of Louisiana.

From 2006 to 2011, Jordan served as director of the Howard Hughes Medical Institute’s Science Education Alliance program, where she launched the SEA-PHAGES program. This program has been implemented at more than 100 institutions and resulted in numerous scientific and pedagogical publications.

She served as the seventh president of St. Mary’s College of Maryland from 2014 to 2025.. On May 10, 2024, Jordan announced that she would be retiring on June 30, 2025.

== Awards and honors ==
Jordan’s recent honors include being named as one of Fisk University’s Talented Tenth (2016), Purdue University Distinguished Women Scholar (2015-15), and Influential Marylander by the Daily Record (2015). She received the Torchbearer Award (2014) from the National Coalition of Black Women, Baltimore Metropolitan Chapter, and was inducted (2015) into the Zeta chapter of Phi Beta Kappa. In 1989, Tuajuanda C. Jordan became the first African American woman to earn a Ph.D. in biochemistry from Purdue University.
