= William Pfaff =

American journalist

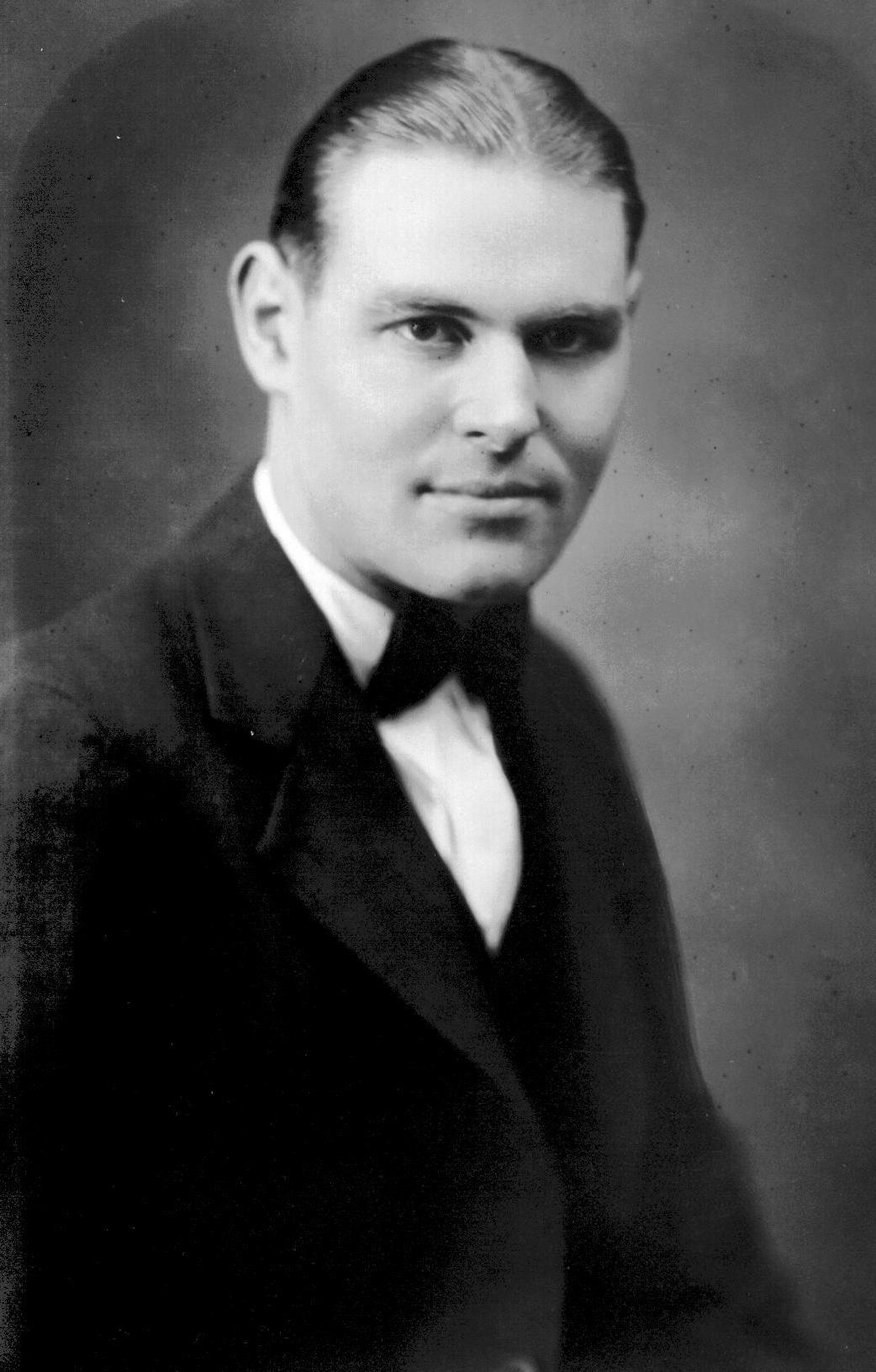
- Born: December 29, 1928; Council Bluffs, Iowa, US
- Died: April 30, 2015 (aged 86); Paris, France
- Education: University of Notre Dame
- Occupations: Writer, political commentator
- Website: www.williampfaff.com

William Pfaff (December 29, 1928 – April 30, 2015) was an American author, op-ed columnist for the International Herald Tribune and frequent contributor to The New York Review of Books.

== Early life ==
Pfaff was born in Council Bluffs, Iowa, and was of German, English, and Irish origin. He grew up in Iowa and Georgia and graduated from the University of Notre Dame in 1949, having majored in literary and political studies.

== Early career ==
Thanks to a letter of recommendation from Frank O'Malley, an English professor at Notre Dame, Pfaff obtained a job working for the lay-Catholic Commonweal magazine in 1949.

Pfaff served in infantry and Special Forces units of the United States Army during and after the Korean War. The Korean Armistice Agreement was signed while Pfaff was on a cruise ship and so he never saw action. He was honorably discharged with the rank of staff sergeant.

He returned to Commonweal as an assistant editor and in 1955 for extensive travel in Europe, Africa, and the Middle East. After a brief passage at ABC News in New York (1955–1957), he was invited to join Free Europe Committee. In 1961, he was hired by Herman Kahn at the Hudson Institute and became one of its first members.

== Antiwar author ==
I don't see that devastating a small country's economy, then mounting a 25,000-man invasion, which kills over 300 people and wounds hundreds more, to seize a disreputable but unimportant military adventurer over whom U.S. courts have disputed jurisdiction, should be considered a success.

— Pfaff on the US invasion of Panama.

His first book, The New Politics: America and the End of the Postwar World (with Edmund Stillman) was published in 1961. Seven others followed.

Robert Heilbroner wrote in 1964:

"I suspect that in the future it will no longer be possible to qualify as a wholly serious thinker if one has not, to whatever small degree, made one's peace or accommodation with [his] harsh message."

During the 1960s, Pfaff co-wrote three books with Ed Stillman: The New Politics: America and the End of the Postwar World (1961), The Politics of Hysteria: The Sources of Twentieth-Century Conflict (1964), and Power and Impotence: The Failure of America's Foreign Policy (1966). In 1971, Pfaff added a fourth book, this time without Stillman's co-authorship, entitled Condemned to Freedom.

In his role at the Hudson Institute, Pfaff provided the counterpoint to Kahn's more bellicose views at official events and debates. Fed up with the debate over the Vietnam War, Pfaff moved to Paris in 1971 to become Deputy Director of the Hudson Institute Europe, founded by Stillman but eventually becoming independent of Kahn's Hudson Institute.

In 1978, he resigned from the Hudson Institute Europe to continue his career as a freelance journalist and writer. His most prestigious contract was with William Shawn's The New Yorker. Between 1971 and 1992, he published more than 70 "Reflections" ("a political-literary form of your own invention," his editor, Shawn, wrote to him), on international politics and society in the magazine. Pfaff's other long-standing contract was for a twice-weekly opinion column for the International Herald Tribune; it continued in one form or another until his death.

In 1989, Pfaff brought together a modified collection of several of his New Yorker pieces, "The Barbarian Sentiments." Although it was mostly written and edited in 1988, the political events of 1989 culminating in the fall of the Berlin Wall seemed to vindicate Pfaff's views on foreign policy. He was honored by being a finalist for the 1989 National Book Award, and in the years that followed, he became a much sought-after lecturer throughout the world.

In 1993, he published The Wrath of Nations: Civilization and the Furies of Nationalism, a study of nationalism. In 1995, he served as the Wayne Morse Chair of Law and Politics, established in honor of the late former Senator against the Vietnam War, at the University of Oregon.

Before the Iraq War in 2003, Pfaff wrote several columns questioning the war. Many of the columns were collected in the 2004 collection, Fear, Anger and Failure: A Chronicle of the Bush Administration's War Against Terror, from the Attacks of September 11, 2001 to Defeat in Baghdad, published by Algora. About the same time, Pfaff published a book about the appeal of revolutionary violence in the 20th century, The Bullet's Song.

In 2010, Pfaff published his last book, The Irony of Manifest Destiny.

His magazine articles have appeared in The New York Review of Books, Harper's, Foreign Affairs, World Policy Journal, The National Interest, and other publications in the United States, and elsewhere in Commentaire (Paris), Neue Zürcher Zeitung and DU magazine (both Zurich), Politica Exterior (Madrid), Europäische Rundschau (Vienna), Blätter für deutsche und internationale Politik (Berlin), and other journals.

The American historian Arthur M. Schlesinger Jr. has called him "Walter Lippmann's authentic heir." He died of a heart attack after a fall in 2015. He is buried in Paris, in Père Lachaise cemetery (Division 87th, Box 16427)

== Books ==
- The New Politics: America and the End of the Postwar World with Ed Stillman (1961)
- The Politics of Hysteria: The Sources of Twentieth-Century Conflict with Ed Stillman (1964)
- Power and Impotence: The Failure of America's Foreign Policy with Ed Stillman (1966)
- Condemned to Freedom (1971)
- Barbarian Sentiments: America in the New Century (2000) (a revision of Barbarian Sentiments: How the American Century Ends (1989))
- The Wrath of Nations: Civilization and the Furies of Nationalism (1993)
- The Bullet's Song: Romantic Violence and Utopia (2004)
- Fear, Anger and Failure: A Chronicle of the Bush Administration's War against Terror from the Attacks of September 11, 2001 to Defeat in Baghdad (2004)
- The Irony Of Manifest Destiny: The Tragedy of American Foreign Policy, New York, Walker and Company (2010).
