= Anna Ranta =

New Zealand neurologist

Annemarei Ranta
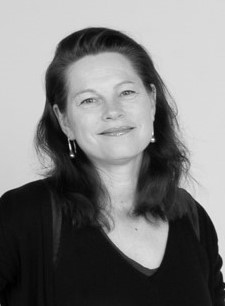
- Born: Germany

Academic background
- Education: University of Otago, Massey University
- Thesis: Transient Ischaemic Attack and Stroke Electronic Decision Support to Improve Stroke Care in New Zealand (2014)
- Doctoral advisor: Susan Dovey, Mark Weatherall

Annemarei Ranta is a New Zealand academic neurologist, and is a full professor at the University of Otago, specialising in stroke care.

== Academic career ==
Ranta was born in Germany. She obtained her medical degree from Pennsylvania State University, and also has a Bachelor of Arts in philosophy and biology from St Mary's College of Maryland. She moved to New Zealand in 2007, where she was initially a consultant neurologist and lead stroke physician at the MidCentral District Health Board.

Ranta completed a postgraduate certificate in public health at Massey University in 2010, and a PhD titled Transient Ischaemic Attack and Stroke Electronic Decision Support to Improve Stroke Care in New Zealand at the University of Otago. Ranta was appointed associate professor at Otago in 2017, and full professor in 2021. As of 2024, she is head of the Department of Medicine at the University of Otago's Wellington campus.

Ranta's research is focused on stroke care and the development of interventions to improve stroke care. Ranta led Health Research Council-funded research that showed significant variations in stroke care across New Zealand, for instances some patients received follow-up care within 1–2 weeks while others waited up to five months. There were also differences in care received by Māori and Pacific patients. Ranta has worked on decreasing such inequities in stroke care, leading the development of tools such as electronic decision support tools for stroke prevention, for use by GPs, and ways to improve access to stroke specialists from rural healthcare services.

Ranta leads the New Zealand National Stroke Registry and Stroke Strategy. Ranta is a on the boards of the World Stroke Organisation and the Australian and New Zealand Association of Neurologists. She has been President of the Neurological Association of New Zealand. She is on several editorial boards, including those of Stroke and Neurology.

== Selected works ==
- James, Spencer; Kalkidan Hassen Abate; Cristiana Abbafati; et al. (2018). "Global, regional, and national incidence, prevalence, and years lived with disability for 354 diseases and injuries for 195 countries and territories, 1990-2017: a systematic analysis for the Global Burden of Disease Study 2017". The Lancet. 392 (10159): 1789–1858. doi:10.1016/s0140-6736(18)32279-7. PMC 6227754. PMID 30496104. Wikidata Q59131985.
- Feigin, Valery L.; Raimundas Lunevicius; Yuan-pang Wang; et al. (2019). "Global, regional, and national burden of neurological disorders, 1990-2016: a systematic analysis for the Global Burden of Disease Study 2016". The Lancet Neurology. 18 (5): 459–480. doi:10.1016/s1474-4422(18)30499-x. PMC 6459001. PMID 30879893. Wikidata Q63681992.
- Ranta, Anna (2018). "Projected stroke volumes to provide a 10-year direction for New Zealand stroke services". The New Zealand Medical Journal. 131 (1477): 15–28. PMID 29927912. Wikidata Q95587675.
- Barber, Alan; Teddy Y. Wu; Ranta, Anna (2020). "Stroke reperfusion therapy following dabigatran reversal with idarucizumab in a national cohort". Neurology. 94 (19). doi:10.1212/wnl.0000000000009155. PMID 32079737. Wikidata Q89808385.
- Karim Mahawish; John Gommans; Timothy Kleinig; Bhavesh Lallu; Alicia Tyson; Ranta, Anna (2021). "Switching to Tenecteplase for Stroke Thrombolysis". Stroke. 52 (10). doi:10.1161/strokeaha.121.035931. PMID 34465202. Wikidata Q124714675.
