= Waldemar Gurian =

German-American political scientist (1902–1954)

- Born: February 13, 1902; Saint Petersburg, Russian Empire
- Died: May 26, 1954 (aged 52); South Haven, Michigan, U.S.
- Employer: University of Notre Dame

Waldemar Gurian (February 13, 1902 – May 26, 1954) was a Russian-born German-American political scientist, author, and professor at the University of Notre Dame. He is regarded particularly as a theorist of totalitarianism. He wrote widely on political Catholicism.

Gurian was born into an Armenian-Jewish family in 1902 in St. Petersburg, Russia, and was brought to Germany in 1911 by his mother, who had him christened in 1914 as a Catholic. He studied with political philosopher Carl Schmitt at the University of Bonn but disagreed on issues of political theology. In 1923-24 he was editor of The Cologne Volks Zeitung.

In 1931 he emigrated to the US and joined the faculty of the Academy of Politics of Notre Dame University as a lecturer and teacher. In 1937 he was appointed as assistant professor of politics, and in 1944 a full professor of political science. He founded The Review of Politics. The quarterly scholarly journal was modeled after German Catholic journals. It quickly emerged as part of an international Catholic intellectual revival, offering an alternative vision to positivist philosophy. For 44 years, the Review was edited by Gurian, Matthew Fitzsimons, Frederick Crosson, and Thomas Stritch. Intellectual leaders included Gurian, Jacques Maritain, Frank O'Malley, Leo Richard Ward, F. A. Hermens, and John U. Nef. It became a major forum for political ideas and modern political concerns, especially from a Catholic and scholastic tradition.

== Selected bibliography ==
For a complete list, see B. Szczesniak, "Select Bibliography of Waldemar Gurian." The Review of Politics 17.01 (1955): 80–81.

- The political system of Alexander Hamilton, 1789–1804, 1929.
- The political and social ideas of French Catholicism, 1789-1914, 1929.
- The integral nationalism in France: Charles Maurras and the Action Française, 1931.
- Bolshevism: Theory and Practice, New York, Macmillan, 1932.
- Hitler and the Christians. Studies in Fascism: Ideology and Practice, AMS Press, 1936, 175 p.
- The Future of Bolshevism, Sheed & Ward, 1936, 125 p.
- The Rise and Decline of Marxism, Oates & Washbourne, 1938, 184 p.
- Russia and the Peace, 1945.
- Soviet Russia: A University of Notre Dame Symposium, University of Notre Dame, 1950.
- "The Development of the Soviet Regime: From Lenin to Stalin", The Soviet Union: Background, Ideology, Reality, University of Notre Dame Press, 1951.
- Bolshevism: An Introduction to Soviet Communism, University of Notre Dame Press, 1952.
- Soviet Imperialism: Its Origins and Tactics, a Symposium, (ed.), University of Notre Dame Press, 1953.
- The Catholic Church in World Affairs (with M. A. Fitzsimons), University of Notre Dame Press, 1954, 420 p.
- "Totalitarianism as Political Religion", Totalitarianism, New York, Grosset & Dunlap, 1964.
