= Rosewell Hobart Graves =

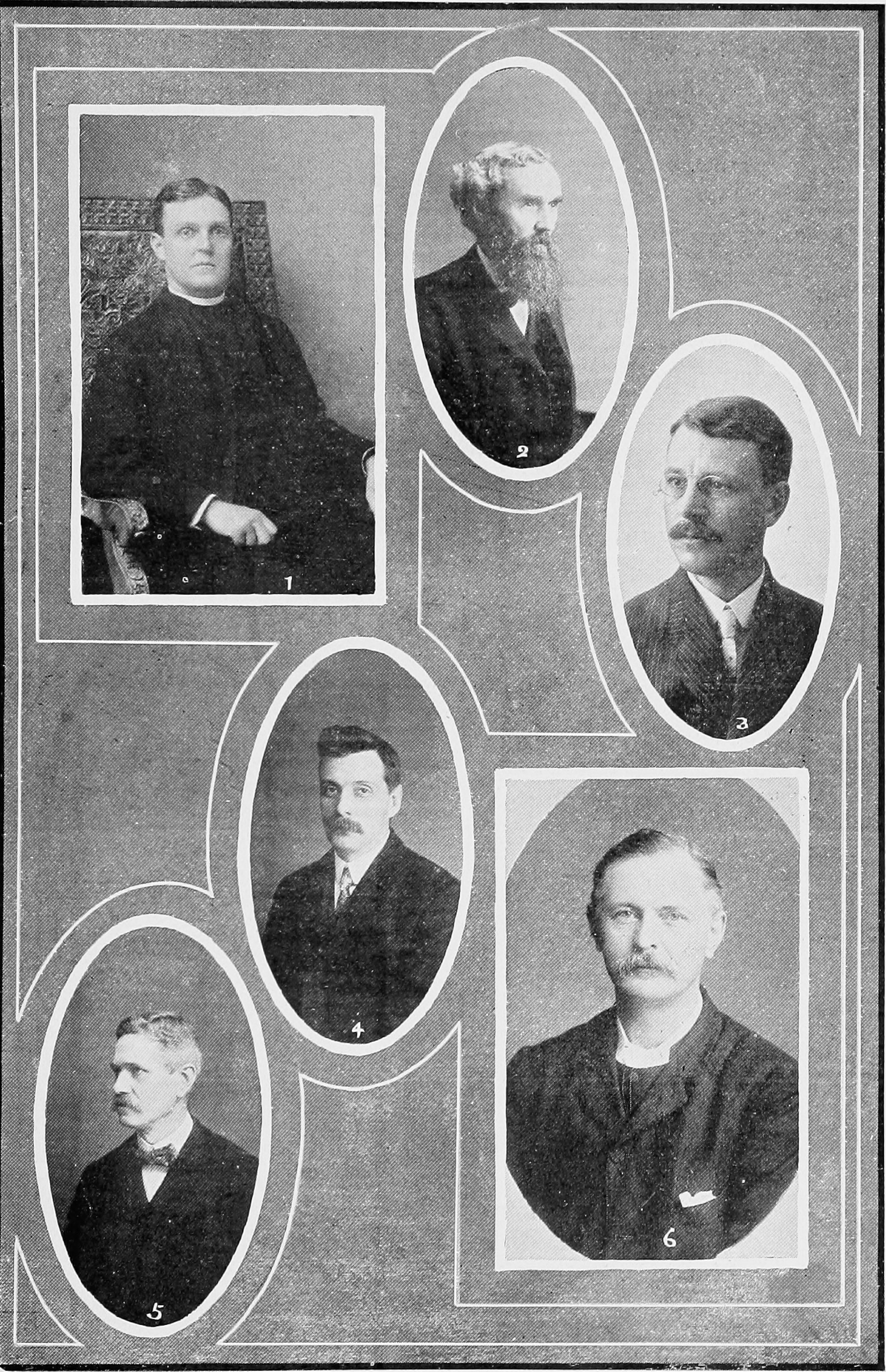
Picture of China Centenary Missionary Conference records; Held at Shanghai, April 25 to May 8, 1907. Graves is pictured in the bottom left.

Rosewell Hobart Graves (1833–1912) was a Christian medical missionary from Baltimore, Maryland. He served the communities of Southern China for 56 years. He was the longest-serving Southern Baptist missionary in the area, and made his impact by spreading western medicine and religion to women, inspiring the founding of the Woman's Missionary Union, and founding 42 schools. His literary work described his impact on the communities he visited.

== Early life and family ==
Rosewell Hobart Graves was born on May 29, 1833, in Baltimore, Maryland. His father was a medical doctor, and became the reason why Graves decided to study medicine. His mother, Ann Baker Graves was an author who supported Christian missionaries. Throughout his career, Graves was constantly writing to his mother, primarily about his strategy of converting the women of China. Taking inspiration, Ann went on to meet with women in Maryland to do the same thing, effectively founding Woman's Mission to Woman, now known as the Woman's Missionary Union.

At age 15, Graves began to develop his faith in Christ due to pastor Richard Fuller of the Seventh Baptist Church in Baltimore, Maryland. He graduated from St. Mary's College in 1853, with aspirations of becoming a doctor. He listened to the talks of J. Lewis Shuck and T. J. Bowen, missionaries who spoke at the Baptist General Convention in Baltimore in 1853.

== Mission work ==
In March 1855, Graves was formally appointed to serve in China. In April 1856, Graves got an honorary medical license from the University of Maryland, and was ordained as a Southern Baptist missionary at the Seventh Baptist Church, Baltimore. He left for China in April 1856, and began to learn Chinese from the people on his boat.

On August 14, 1856, Graves arrived in Canton, China. He faced conflicts as British Admiral Seymour attacked Canton, in the Battle of Canton. In response, Graves, alongside the Baptist mission buildings sailed to Macau, where he spent the remainder of the year studying Chinese. In February 1857, he opened his first chapel, a small repurposed home. Later that year, Macao was struck with a typhoon, causing multiple deaths and irreparable damages. Graves faced financial concerns, and wrote home to request the churches send more. He stayed until 1859, opening another chapel during that time.

In February 1859, Graves traveled 10 miles northeast of Canton, to a large town inhabited by members of the Hakkas. He was welcomed and treated well as he preached and distributed books. Less than a month later on March 1, he sailed to San Yong. The people of the nearby villages were so interested in the foreigners that Graves and his team had to sleep on the boat to escape questioning.

However, in 1860, Graves was found guilty of being a foreigner in the interior, and was flogged with a rattan whip as punishment. Despite the opposition from the Chinese, Graves rented a house in Shin Hing in March 1861, successfully opening a third chapel.

Graves began administering medicine, vaccinations, and implementing Western medicine techniques. Alongside medicine, he and his team continued distributing Christian scriptures and books. He believed strongly in the importance of medical missionaries. He states in his book, Forty Years in China, that both were created by God, and could benefit from God's redemption.

Graves stayed building and staffing hospitals in order to have connections with doctors, nurses, teachers, and patients that had a developed understanding of Christianity. He continued to support the communities in Southern China until more financial hardships stemming from the American Civil War. He lost funding from churches at home, but soon received greater donations from friends in England and China.

As the church at Shin Hing grew, more people started coming forward to get baptized. Graves elected Au, a reformed Chinese man to be a pastor in Shin Hing. He started to notice that women were presenting themselves for baptism equally as often as men. These Christian women would take a Bible and share the gospel to their female neighbors. This began a movement of women taking charge of religion. It was at this time that Graves wrote about his discoveries to his mother, Ann Graves. Ann was moved and began preaching the gospel to women in Baltimore, sparking the group that is now known as the Woman's Missionary Union (WMU).

With an increased involvement of women in the Protestant Church, it was now feasible for Graves to begin building another church. In 1869, a new chapel was built, solely with the donations from new Chinese Christians.

Graves also took part in educational reformation in China. He held a Bible class in order to introduce a systemic education for Chinese people who were starting their religious journey. Graves began to teach certain people in the community the ways of theological education, discipling them to be evangelists and pastors. He started a training program that became the first Southern Baptist-built school for theological education established overseas. It was named the Graves Theological Seminary.

He also built lower-level schools in Canton and nearby towns. Only two of the schools, one in Shin Hing and the boys' school in Canton, were dependent on the International Mission Board. The others, which included several girls' schools, were funded by donations from Chinese Christians and special donors. Funds from churches in Mississippi later allowed him to build and open a school in Lao Hai, a new location.

== Family ==
Graves was single for the first 7 years of his missionary work. His two closest friends were Charles and Eva Gaillard. Charles died in a typhoon in 1863. Graves and Eva Gaillard married that year, and Graves adopted Eva's son as his own. Eva fell ill and died within a year of their marriage. In 1867, Graves sent his adopted son to Baltimore, Maryland so he could be cared for.

In 1871, Graves began to court Jane W. Norris, a widowed woman who lived in Baltimore. She became a teacher and worked alongside Graves until her death in 1888. Two years later, in 1890, Graves married widow Janie Lowery Sanford, who was another Southern Baptist missionary in South China. They worked together to open schools for women, and the first school for the blind in China.

== Works and publications ==
Cover of Forty Years in China, or, China in translation by R. H. Graves

In 1868, Graves published two tracts.

- “What Stand Should Chinese Churches Take With Regard to Church Members’ Binding Their Daughters’ Feet?”
- “The Place of Bible Distribution in the Scheme of Evangelization.”

The first tract discussed Graves' opposition to the widespread practice of feet binding women in China. He gave three reasons within the writings: (1) Health reasons, (2) It was a sinful confirmation to custom, and (3) It interfered with a woman's usefulness. This tract aligned with his belief that women should have more freedom, and helped support the movement of modernization in the treatment of women.

The second tract explained the difference between Protestant and Catholic preachings: Their answers to the question proposed by the title of the first tract.

In 1895, Graves published his book- Forty Years in China, or, China in Translation. Because of this book, Graves was awarded a Doctor of Divinity (D.D).

== Death and legacy ==
Graves' health began to decline. He contracted malaria during a trip to Hong Kong in 1898, which recurred several times throughout the following years. His eyesight began to worsen, and his motor skills were decreasing, shown mainly through his deteriorating handwriting. Graves died on June 3, 1912, in Guangzhou. He left behind 43 Baptist missionaries, over 140 Chinese preaching to 5000+ members, and 42 schools with over 1300 students.
