= Frank O'Malley =

Professor at the University of Notre Dame (1909-1974)

- Born: Francis J. O'Malley; 18 August 1909; Clinton, Massachusetts
- Died: May 7, 1974 (aged 64); South Bend, Indiana
- Burial place: Holy Cross Cemetery, Notre Dame, Indiana
- Occupation: University professor
- Years active: 1932-1974

Frank O'Malley (19 August 1909 – 7 May 1974) was a professor of English at the University of Notre Dame. He spent his entire career at Notre Dame, where he was renowned as an undergraduate teacher.

== Early life and education ==
O'Malley was born in 1909 into an Irish immigrant family in Clinton, Massachusetts, where his father worked in a cotton mill. O'Malley attended Catholic grammar school and public high school in Clinton. After graduating from high school at the top of his class, he spent two years working at a drug store to save money to attend university.

O'Malley attended the University of Notre Dame in 1928 as an undergraduate and graduated in 1932, as the class valedictorian. In 1933 he was awarded a Master of Arts degree in English. After one year as an instructor in English and History, he was hired full-time by the English department in 1934.

== Career at Notre Dame ==
O'Malley remained at Notre Dame and taught in the English department until his death in 1974. He was exceedingly popular with his students and came to be acknowledged as "the university's most inspiring undergraduate teacher". An obituary in The Review of Politics described him as "certainly the greatest teacher of the humanities in the modern history of Notre Dame".

O'Malley enjoyed and excelled at teaching freshman composition, encouraging his students to "write something fresh about a tree, the feeling of alienation, their first kiss". In 1936 he introduced a course in "Modern Catholic Writers" which he continued to teach for the rest of his career. It introduced students to recent and contemporary Catholic authors working in a various disciplines and became "by far the most popular course in the humanities ever offered at the university". In 1938 he instituted a new program for English majors called "Philosophy of English Literature". His thinking and teaching were influenced by contemporary European Catholic lay intellectuals, including Waldemar Gurian, Jacques Maritain, and Étienne Gilson.

In 1939 O'Malley and Gurian founded the journal The Review of Politics. O'Malley was managing director from its establishment until 1963 and published eight articles in the journal. His subjects included John Henry Newman, Romano Guardini, Maritain, and William Blake.

In 1971 O'Malley was awarded Notre Dame's Sheedy Teaching Award for "sustained excellence in research and instruction over a wide range of courses" in the College of Arts and Letters. In 1972 he was awarded an honorary doctorate by Notre Dame. He had been nominated for the degree by the student body.

== Posthumous recognition ==
In 1991, during the celebration of the university's 150th anniversary, a weekend symposium on O'Malley attracted 200 of his former students to the Notre Dame campus.

In 1994 Notre Dame established the annual Frank O'Malley Undergraduate Teaching Award for "outstanding service to the students of the Notre Dame Community".
