= Carla Fehr =

Canadian philosopher

- Institutions: University of Waterloo
- Main interests: Philosophy of biology, feminist epistemology, philosophy of science, feminist science studies

Carla Fehr is a Canadian professor of philosophy at the University of Waterloo where she holds the Wolfe Chair in Scientific and Technological Literacy.

== Education and career ==
Fehr received her bachelor's from the University of Saskatchewan in biology and philosophy, and her doctorate in philosophy from Duke University.

Fehr is currently a professor of philosophy at the University of Waterloo and the Wolfe Chair in Scientific and Technological Literacy. From 1999 until 2011 she was an associate professor of philosophy and affiliate faculty member of Women's Studies at Iowa State University. In 2002, she received both the Shakeshaft Master Teacher award and the ISU Foundation Award for Early Achievement in Teaching. From 2006 to 2011 Fehr was also a co-primary investigator for the Iowa State University's ADVANCE program, which aims to increase the representation of women in STEM fields, especially in STEM faculty positions. Fehr was also a visiting fellow at the Center for Philosophy of Science at the University of Pittsburgh in 2006.

Fehr is a founder and associate director of the American Philosophical Association Committee on the Status of Women's Site Visit Program, a program aimed at gathering information about the challenges women and other minorities face in philosophy and examining the practices and climates of specific departments and making evidence-based and context sensitive recommendations as to how those departments can help improve their climates. Fehr is also a co-chair of The Association for Feminist Epistemologies, Methodologies, Metaphysics, and Science Studies, and was the chair of the Status of Women & Equity Committee (now the Equity Committee) of the Faculty Association of the University of Waterloo.

== Research areas ==
Fehr focuses her research in areas of the philosophy of science, philosophy of biology, and feminist epistemology that have the potential to be directly socially relevant. Much of her research is focused around issues of diversity; specifically, she argues that diversity of social and material location as well as diversity in philosophical background allows for higher quality research to be conducted than would otherwise be possible. Fehr's research focuses on attempting to explain how people acting in good faith tend to resist acknowledging the systemic biases inherent in academia and other institutions, and on how to help alleviate these issues.

== Publications ==
Fehr has published a variety of peer-reviewed articles, including pieces in Hypatia: A Journal of Feminist Philosophy, Ecology, and Molecular Ecology. She has also contributed chapters to a number of books, including chapters in Feminist Epistemology and Philosophy of Science: Power in Knowledge, Oxford Handbook on the Philosophy of Biology, and Removing Barriers: Women in Academic Science, Engineering, Technology and Mathematics.

== See also ==
- List of University of Waterloo people
