= Ethics & the Environment =

- Discipline: Environmental ethics
- Language: English
- Edited by: Piers H. G. Stephens

Publication details
- History: 1996-present
- Publisher: Indiana University Press (United States)
- Frequency: Biannual
- Impact factor: 0.4 (2022)

Standard abbreviations
- ISO 4: Ethics Environ.

Indexing
- ISSN: 1085-6633 (print); 1535-5306 (web)
- JSTOR: 10856633

Links
- Journal homepage

Ethics & the Environment is an academic journal focussed on environmental ethics published by Indiana University Press with support from the Willson Center for Humanities and Arts, the Philosophy Department, and the Franklin College of Arts & Sciences at the University of Georgia. The journal was established in 1996 by Victoria Davion. It is now edited by Piers H. G. Stephens.

== Abstracting and indexing ==
The journal is abstracted or indexed in the Emerging Sources Citation Index, EBSCOhost, Scopus, and ProQuest.
