= The Review of Politics =

- Discipline: Politics, Philosophy, History
- Language: English
- Edited by: Ruth Abbey

Publication details
- History: 1939-present
- Publisher: Cambridge University Press (United States)
- Frequency: Quarterly

Standard abbreviations
- ISO 4: Rev. Politics

Indexing
- ISSN: 0034-6705 (print); 1748-6858 (web)

Links
- Journal homepage; Online access; Online archive

The Review of Politics: A Journal of Political Theory, commonly known as The Review of Politics (ROP), is a quarterly peer-reviewed academic journal in the fields of political theory and the history of political thought. It was founded in 1939 by Waldemar Gurian at the University of Notre Dame and is published by Cambridge University Press.
