= St. Mary's College of Maryland =

Public college in St. Mary's City, Maryland, US

- College seal
- Former name: List: St. Mary's Female Seminary (1840–1927); St. Mary's Female Seminary Junior College (1927–1949); St. Mary's Seminary Junior College (1949–1968)
- Motto: The St. Mary's Way
- Type: Public liberal arts college
- Established: 1840; 186 years ago
- Affiliations: COPLAC
- Endowment: $39.45 million (2024)
- President: Rhonda Phillips
- Faculty: 231
- Undergraduates: 1,517
- Postgraduates: 32
- Location: St. Mary's City, Maryland, U.S. 38.1867°N 76.4309°W
- Campus: Rural, waterfront on St. Mary's River, 319 acres (129 ha), located on site of first Maryland Colony
- Colors: Primary: SMCM Blue; Secondary: Gold and white
- Nickname: Seahawks
- Sporting affiliations: NCAA Division III – UEC; ISA – MAISA
- Website: smcm.edu
- St. Mary's City Historic District
- U.S. National Register of Historic Places
- U.S. National Historic Landmark District
- Location within Maryland
- NRHP reference No.: 69000310

Significant dates
- Added to NRHP: August 4, 1969
- Designated NHLD: August 4, 1969
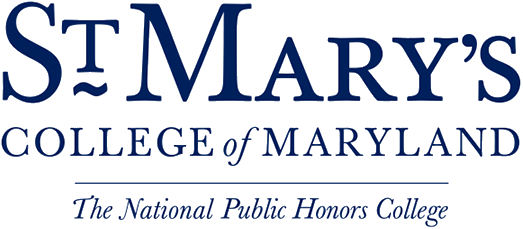

St. Mary's College of Maryland (SMCM) is a public liberal arts college in St. Mary's City, Maryland. Established in 1840, St. Mary's College is an honors college that claims to "offer an experience similar to that of an elite liberal arts college". With about 1,600 enrolled students, the institution offers bachelor's degrees in 21 disciplines, as well as a master's program and certification programs.

The college shares much of its campus with Historic St. Mary's City, the site of Maryland's first colony and capital. It is also the site of the fourth colony in British North America. The Historical Archaeology Field School is jointly operated by St. Mary's College of Maryland and Historic St. Mary's City. The campus and the rest of St. Mary's City combined are considered to be one of the premier archaeological sites in the United States.

== History ==
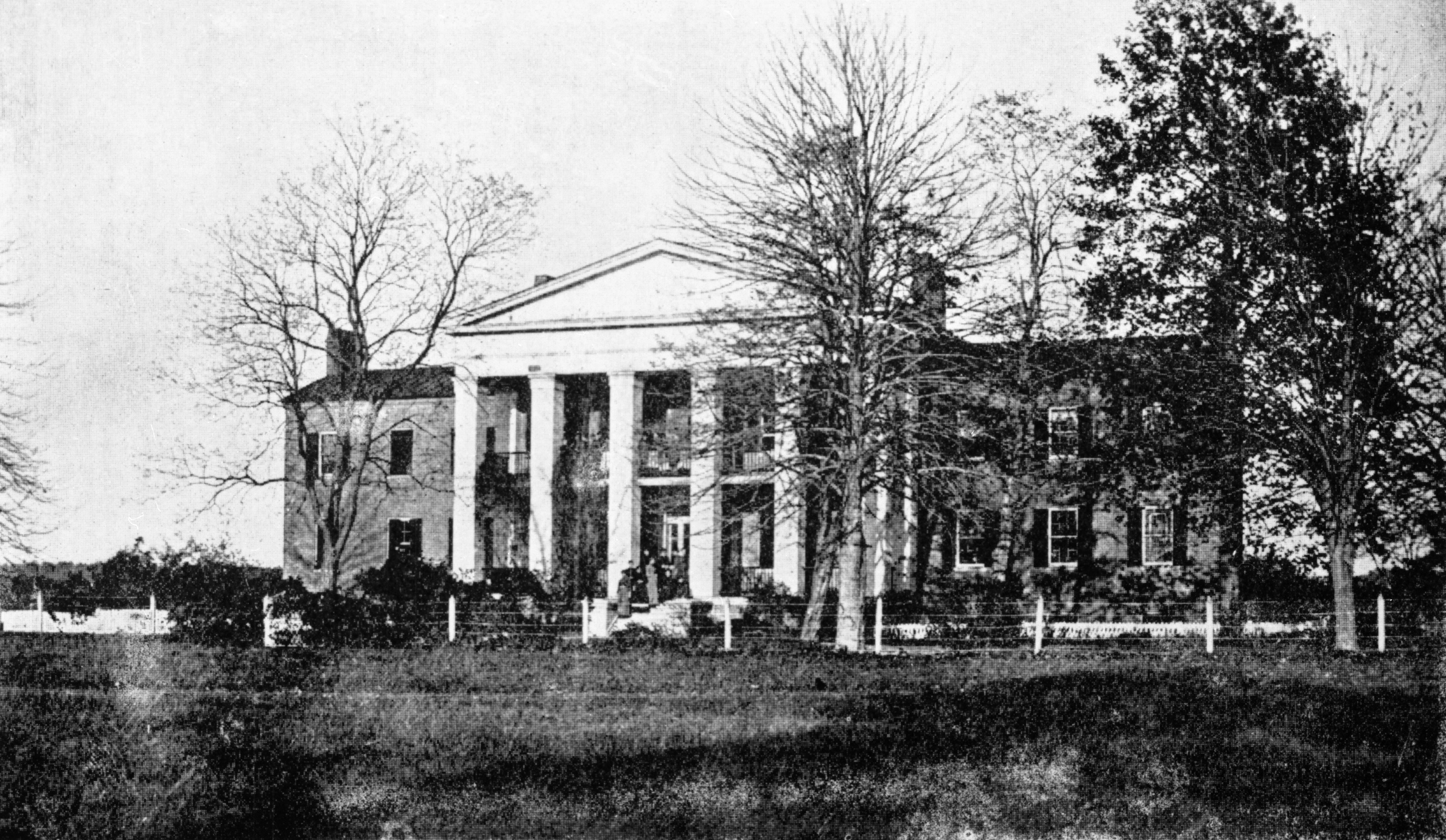
St. Mary's Female Seminary in 1890

St. Mary's College of Maryland is located on the original site of Maryland's first colony, St. Mary's City, which was also the first capital of Maryland and is considered to be the birthplace of religious freedom in America.

Colonial St. Mary's City was actually only a town, and at its peak had between 500 and 600 residents. However, as the colony quickly expanded and settlements spread throughout what is now eastern Maryland, the town remained the capital. Representatives would travel from all over the colony to participate in the Maryland General Assembly, the colony's first legislative body.

The Colony was founded under a mandate by the colonial proprietor, Cecil Calvert, 2nd Baron Baltimore, that the settlers follow religious tolerance of each other. The first settlers were Protestants and Catholics during a time of persecution of the latter, and this mandate was unprecedented then as England had been wracked by religious conflict for centuries.

The college's name, "St. Mary's," commemorates Maryland's first colony, "St. Mary's City", which once stood where the college stands now. It has been coeducational since 1949.

== Academics ==
St. Mary's College offers 21 majors (with 5 additional in development), 29 minors, seven pre-professional programs and it has a master's program in education. It is a public honors college, one of only two such colleges in the United States. As such, it maintains a core honors-level curriculum that all of its students, regardless of major, must complete.

The college underwent its first ever large-scale program review or program prioritization process in February 2021, resulting in the discontinuation of several majors and minors.

It has an 81% overall graduation rate (including longer than four years). The college has a 70% four-year graduation rate, the highest of any public institution in Maryland and third highest in the United States among public colleges. 69% of students pursue dual concurrent degrees or dual minors, which may take longer than four years, in some cases. 10% of students transfer from St. Mary's College to other institutions and 83% of students enroll for a second year.

79% of students are receiving financial aid, with 66% of students receiving grants or scholarships.

The school is a member of Phi Beta Kappa society.

=== Tuition ===
According to the Maryland Higher Education Commission, St. Mary's College, despite being a public institution, competes mostly with elite private colleges. The commission reported in 2014 that the cost of obtaining a degree at St. Mary's College is $30,000 less when compared to the average costs of the elite private colleges that it competes with.

== Accreditation and charter ==
The college is accredited by the Middle States Commission on Higher Education.

Although it is a state-operated institution, St. Mary's is independent of the University System of Maryland as it opted out of the system in 1992. However, in early 2006, St. Mary's College joined the University of Maryland Academic Telecommunications System (UMATS), which interconnects the University System of Maryland with several other networks, including the Internet and Internet2 networks.

== Administration ==
St. Mary's College's current president, Rhonda Phillips, was appointed in 2025.

The school has 150 full-time faculty, 14 of whom are current Fulbright scholars (the college faculty has earned 30 Fulbright research awards in the past 20 years). There is a 9:1 student-to-faculty ratio, one of the lowest in the nation.

== Programs ==
=== Overseas programs ===
Approximately 46% of St. Mary's College students study abroad, half of them for a full semester or more. The Institute of International Education has recognized St. Mary's College as being 17th in the nation (public and private schools combined) for the percentage of its undergraduate students who study abroad for at least one semester.

=== Fulbright program ===
St. Mary's College has had many students and faculty win Fulbright awards. In the 2009–2010 academic year, the college had the second highest number of student Fulbright winners of any public liberal arts college in the nation.

In the 2011–2012 academic year, the college had the third highest number of faculty Fulbright winners in the United States among public and private baccalaureate colleges (undergraduate colleges).

== Historical studies ==
Since 1840, the school has been charged by the state in various capacities in researching, interpreting and memorializing Maryland history at the site of Maryland's first colony and capitol, St. Mary's City, Maryland, which is also where the college is located.

=== Historical Archaeology Field School ===
In this capacity St. Mary's College of Maryland, in partnership with Historic St. Mary's City, also runs the Historical Archaeology Field School which is an internationally recognized institution. The field school has worked on over 300 archaeological dig sites in the St. Mary's City area over the last 40 years.

=== School's inspirational historic grounding ===
This research also includes a special focus and draws inspiration from local milestone historical events related to the struggle for establishment of democracy in Maryland, in many of its aspects, including:

- The early development of representative legislature in Maryland.
- The struggle for the establishment of religious freedom in America.
- The beginnings of the quest for women's suffrage in America.
- The struggle for minority rights in America.
- The beginnings of freedom of the press in the Southern colonies.

== Institutions ==
=== The Center for the Study of Democracy ===
The Center for the Study of Democracy is an interdisciplinary joint initiative of St. Mary's College of Maryland and Historic St. Mary's City.

=== The James P. Muldoon River Center ===
The James P. Muldoon River Center is a biological research center located along the Saint Mary's River. The center administers the Saint Mary's River Project and the university's geothermal operations.

=== The Slackwater Center ===
The Slackwater Center studies the current events, culture and history of St. Mary's County and other rural Chesapeake Bay and Southern Maryland communities. Its focus is interdisciplinary and it studies the region from both an historical and contemporary point of view.

The center studies, records and documents as well as interprets and reports on current and historical life in Chesapeake Bay communities. The center also has a public education mission. Students engage in historical research and historical interpretation as well as documenting oral histories of living residents. The center utilizes interdisciplinary collaboration and also fosters public education and debate.

It also publishes the Slackwater Journal and maintains an extensive archive.

=== Historic St. Mary's City Commission ===
Historic St. Mary's City, which sits next to the college, is a State-run archaeological research, historical research, preservation and interpretation center and an indoor and outdoor museum complex. The area managed by the commission also includes a reconstructed colonial town and sailing ship, located on the historic site of Maryland's first colony.

St. Mary's College and Historic St. Mary's City jointly coordinate programs of study in archaeology, history, museum studies, African American studies, political science and theater. This includes both classroom and also hands-on opportunities in archaeological excavations, museums, and historic interpretation work.

The commission and its grounds are considered to be is a major center for colonial archaeological research and historical research in the United States. There have been over 200 archaeological digs in St. Mary's City worked on by the school over the last 30 years.

All St. Mary's Students may also attend St. Mary's City's public access historical sites and all of its museums for free, year round.

=== The Maryland Heritage Project ===
The Maryland Heritage Project is also a collaboration between St. Mary's College of Maryland and Historic St. Mary's City. It focuses on the reconstruction of colonial buildings in the Historic St. Mary's City living history area, ongoing development of St. Mary's museum exhibits, and also indoor and outdoor historic interpretation.

This involves ongoing projects in archaeological research (including working on active archaeological excavations), historical research as well as management, preservation and analysis and interpretation of period artifacts and documents. The project also provides hands-on as well as classroom studies in archaeology, anthropology, democracy studies, history, international languages and cultures, and museum studies.

=== The Historical Archaeology Field School ===
St. Mary's College of Maryland and Historic St. Mary's Commission also jointly run the Historical Archaeology Field School every summer. It hosts collection-based courses, beginner to advanced level archaeological field training and also summer institutes. The school is attended by students from all over the United States and other countries as well. Many of its graduates now hold prominent positions in the field.

The students not only study, but also work in many of the active archaeological dig sites in St. Mary's City. Providing extensive hands-on experience, the school teaches all aspects of professional archaeological work, including working in real archaeological digs, analyzing and conserving artifacts, as well as cataloging, archiving, and related historical research. The school has been in existence for more than 40 years.

=== St. Mary's College Archives ===
- Southern Maryland Collection: The St. Mary's archives maintains the largest photographic print and audiovisual collection on the history and folk life of the Southern Maryland region.
- History of St. Mary's City Collection: It also maintains an extensive collection on the history of St. Mary's City, Maryland, the first colony of Maryland, and the birthplace of religious freedom. Includes materials on St. Mary's City's precolonial (Native American), colonial, antebellum (slavery era), American Civil War and 20th century history.

=== Other institutions ===
St. Mary's Baltimore Hall Library subscribes to 1,000 periodicals in print and has access to around 20,000 in electronic format. Furthermore, the school participates in the consortium of Maryland public colleges and universities (USMAI), through which library materials from 15 other institutes in the University of Maryland System are accessible.

The New Leadership for the Chesapeake program trains students' in environmental leadership and advocacy as it relates to the Chesapeake Bay. In addition to leadership and advocacy training, classes and field work also focus on the biological and resource management issues affecting the Bay. The program leads to a certificate.

A summer program that brings together notable authors, writers and educators to foster writers of novels, poetry and other venues. Workshops in writing, classes, lectures, mentoring by notable authors and faculty; creative nonfiction, fiction and poetry are offered.

The Rising Tide is the journal of educational studies written by student interns and faculty of the Master of Education program at St. Mary's College of Maryland, named after the adage "A rising tide lifts all boats."

== Arts and culture and the Boyden Gallery ==
St. Mary's College students receive training in curation, planning and design of gallery exhibitions and special programs at the Boyden Gallery. Starting in 2014 the Boyden Gallery and the St. Mary's College of Maryland Masters in Teaching program entered into a partnership with St. Mary's County schools to foster and display works by promising local students. The program involved St. Mary's College of Maryland faculty and students in working with local young artists. The program also sponsored a professionally juried competition and a special yearly exhibitions.

== Campus ==
St. Mary's College of Maryland campus

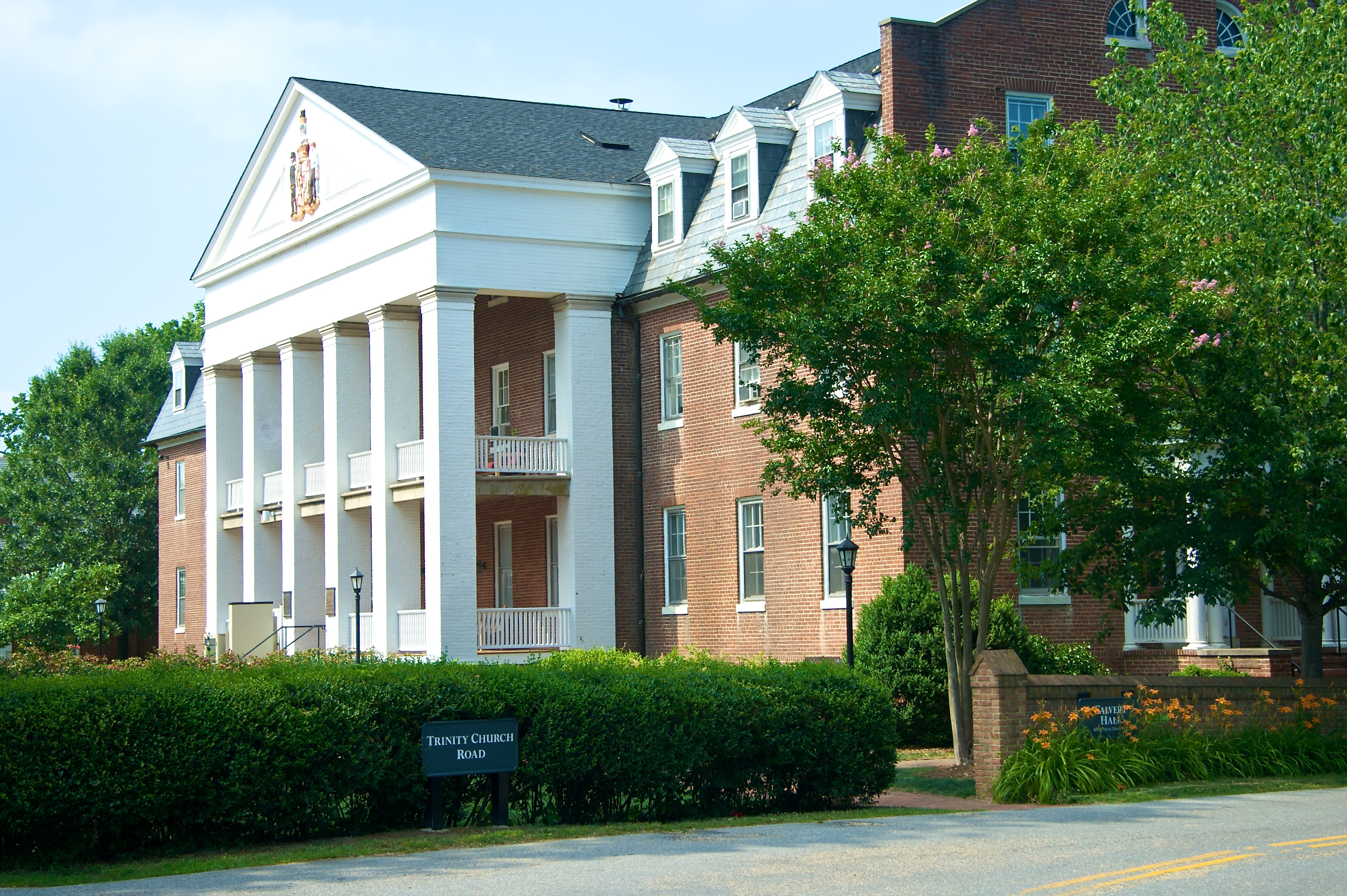
Calvert Hall

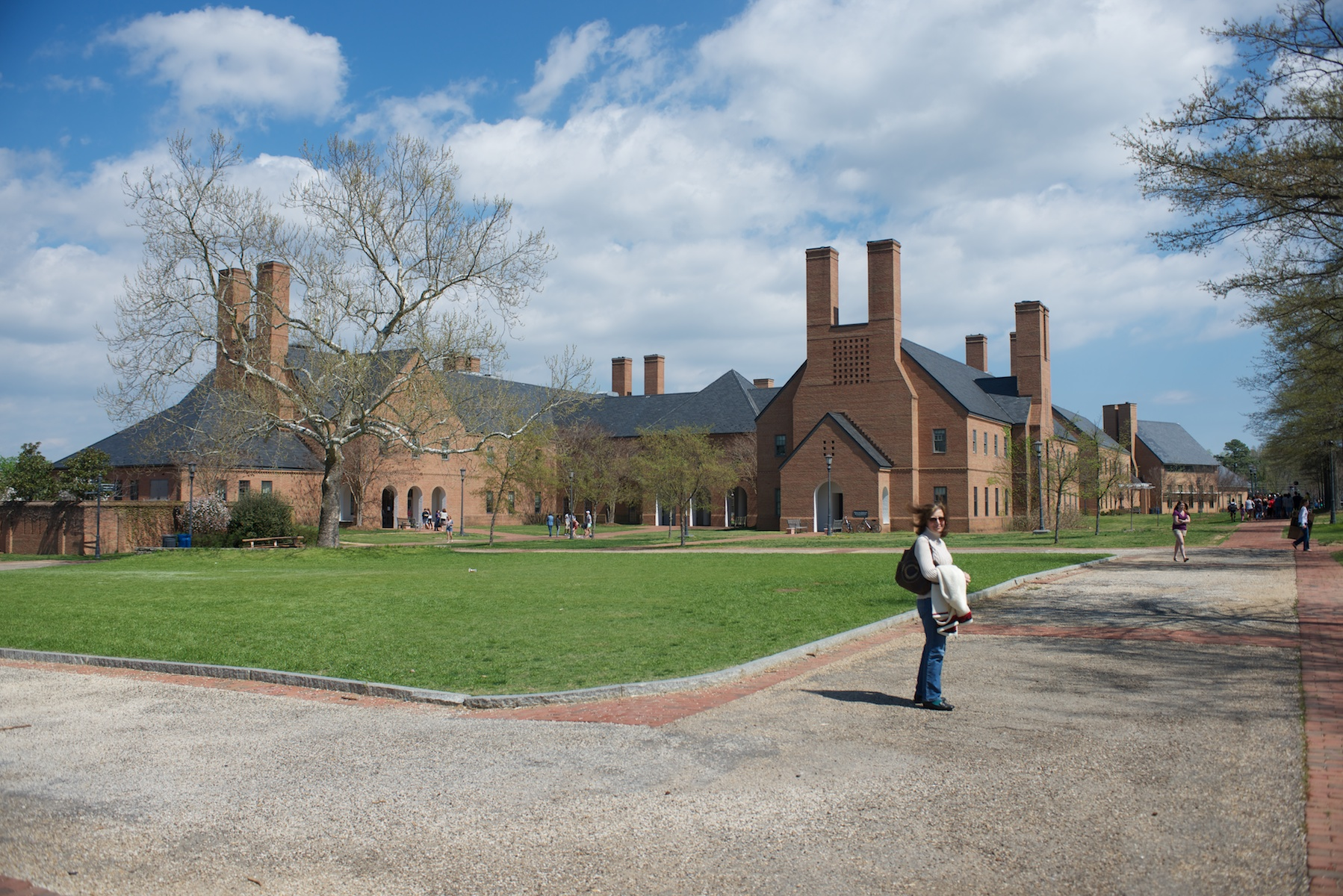
Goodpaster and Schafer Halls

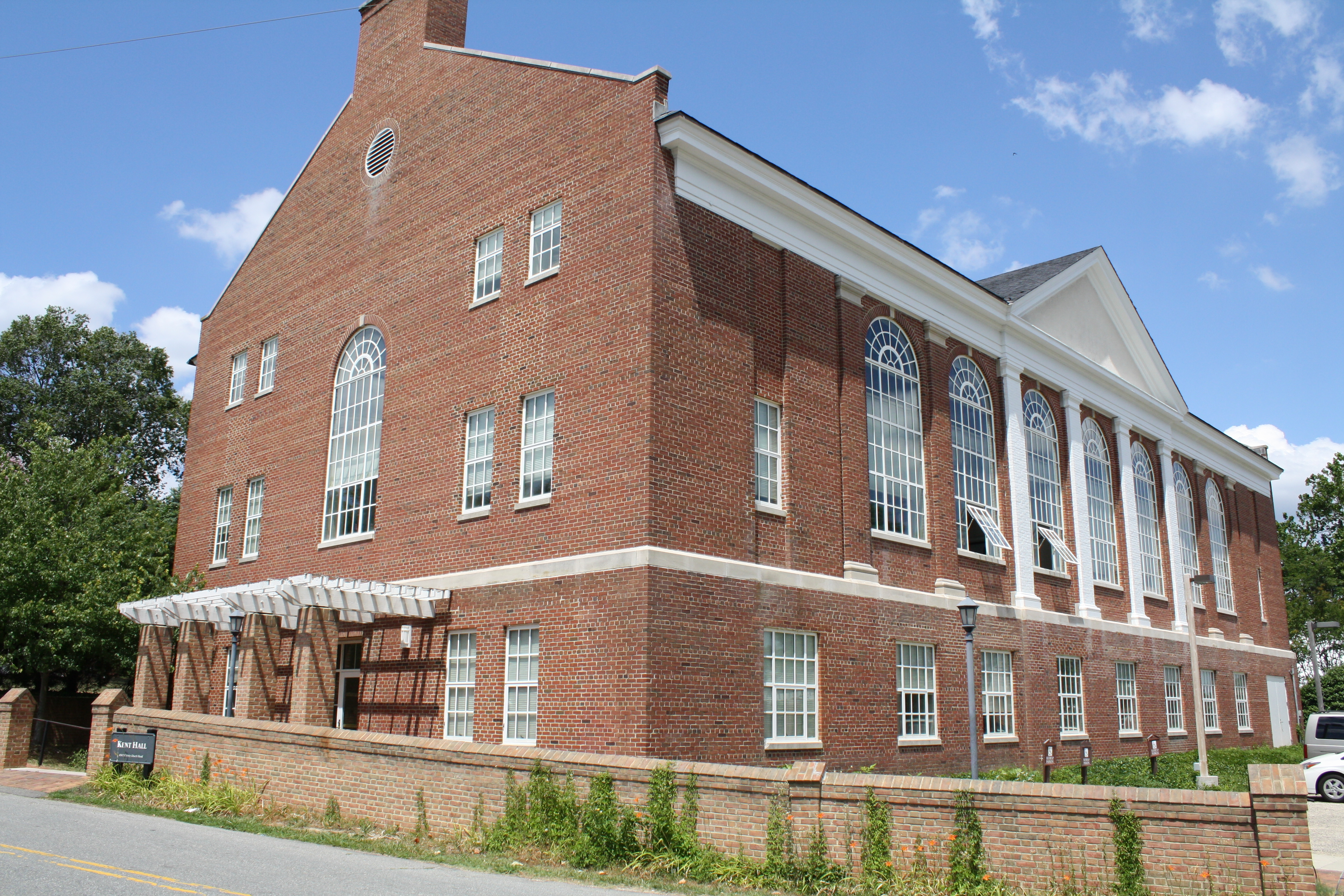
Kent Hall, Social Sciences building

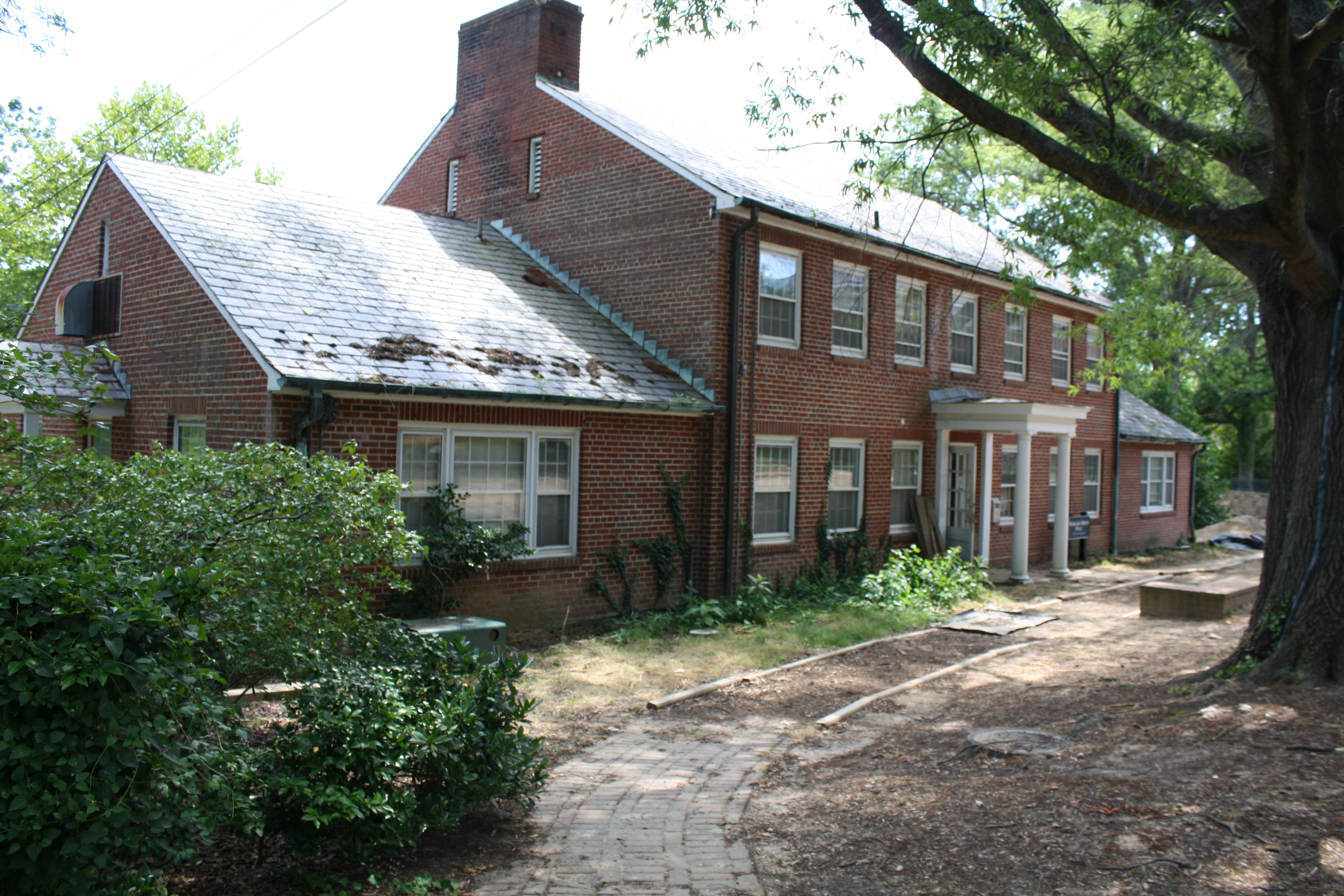
Margaret Brent Hall

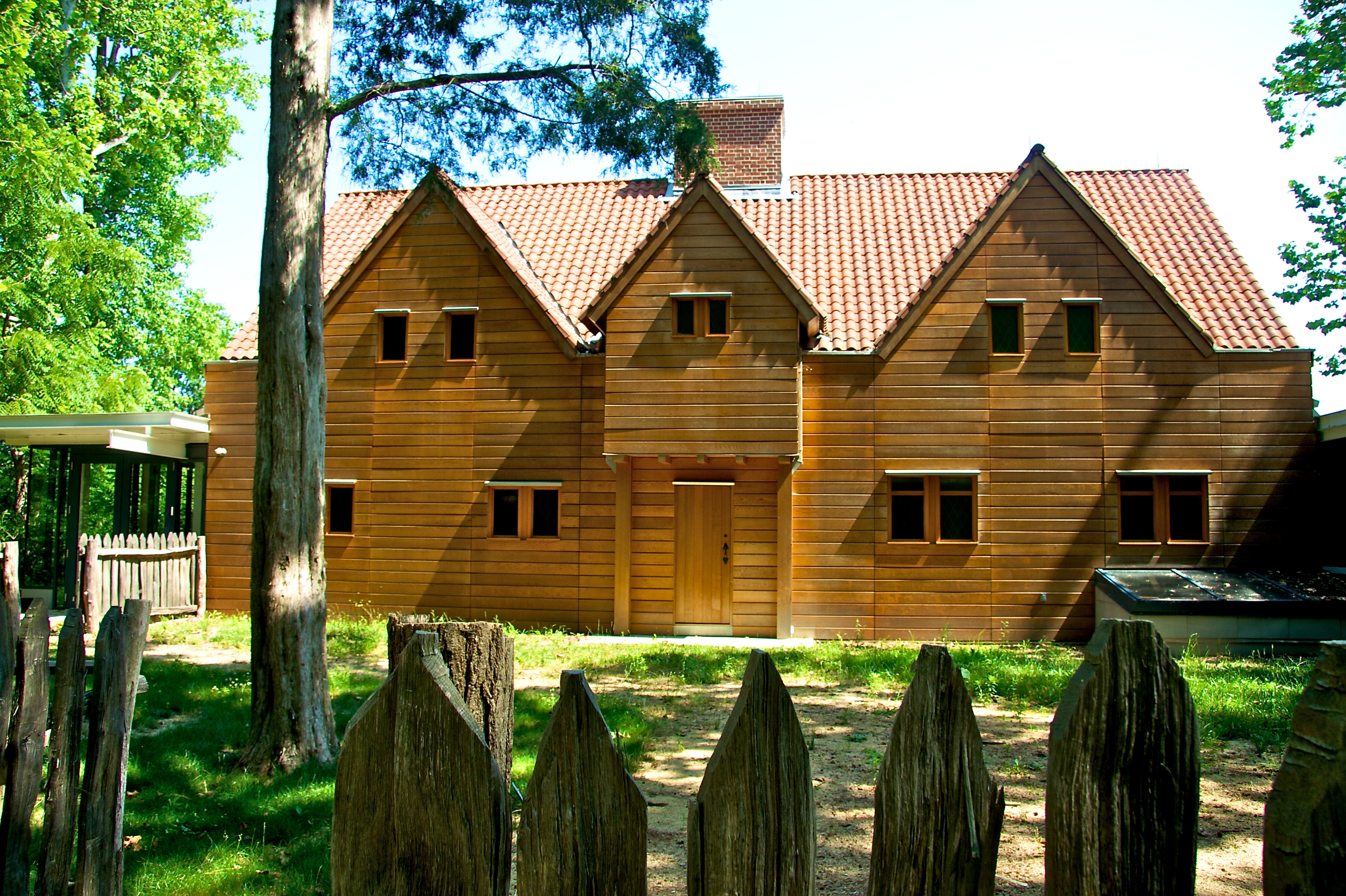
St. John's Site

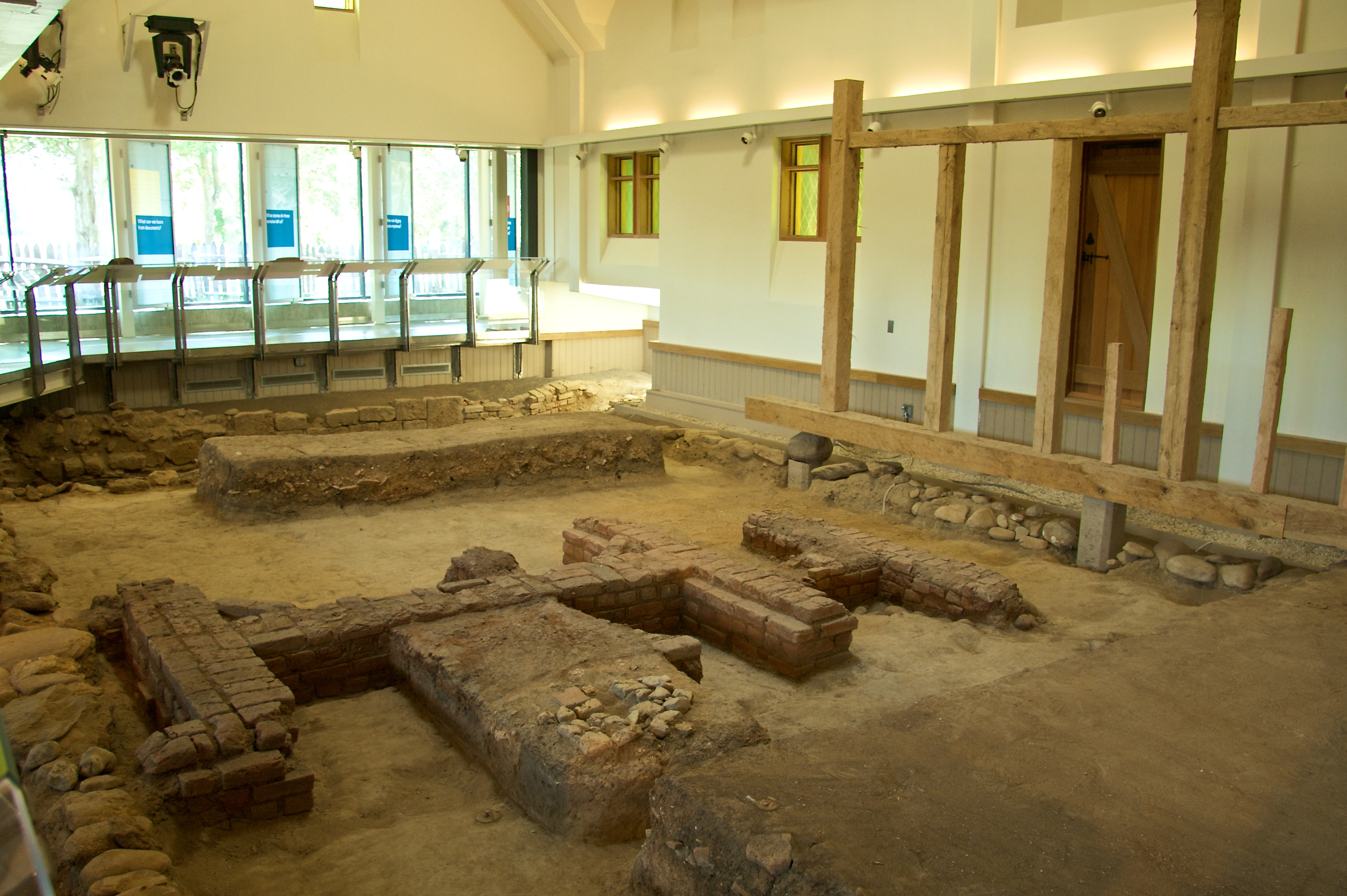
Archaeology museum

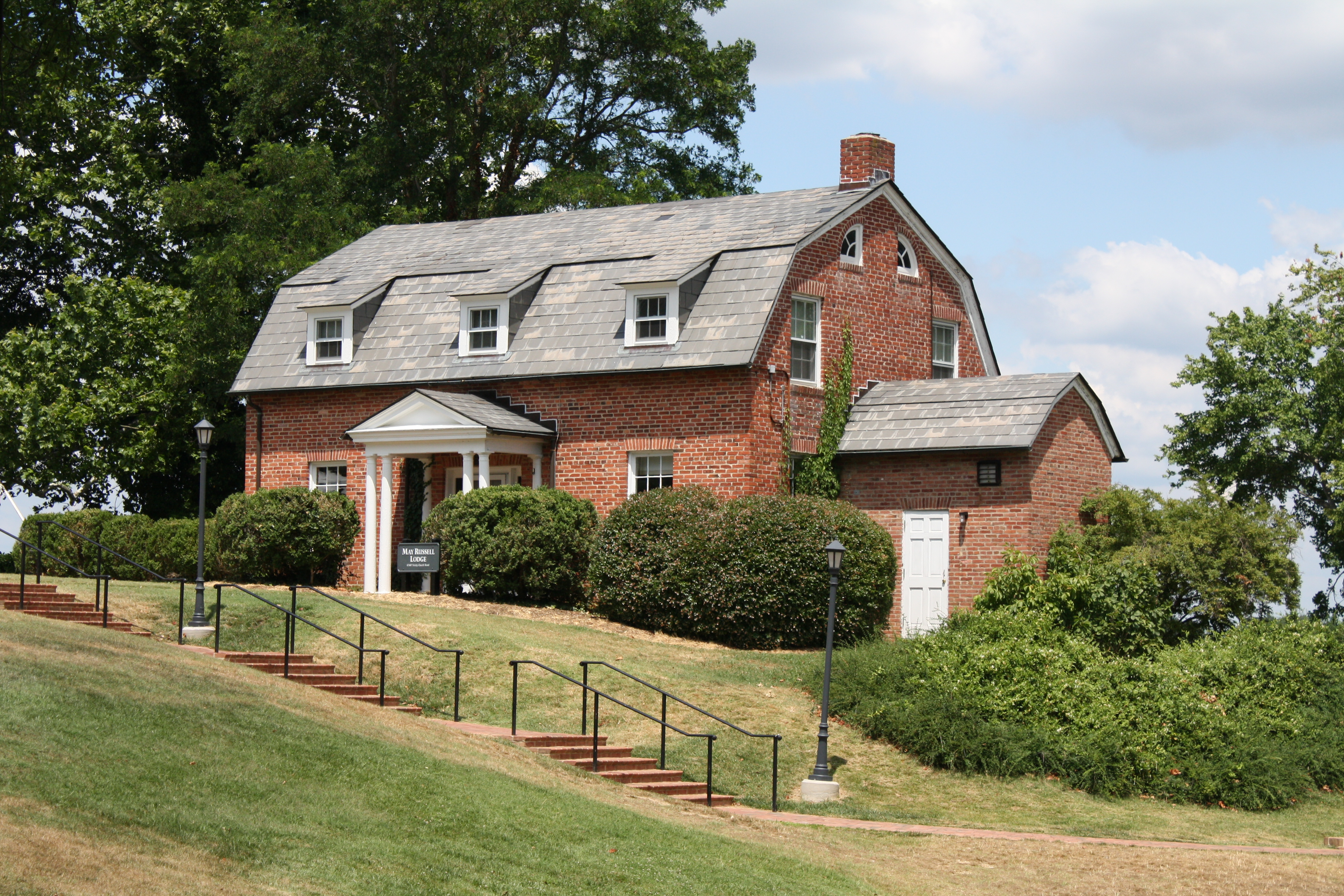
May Russell Hall

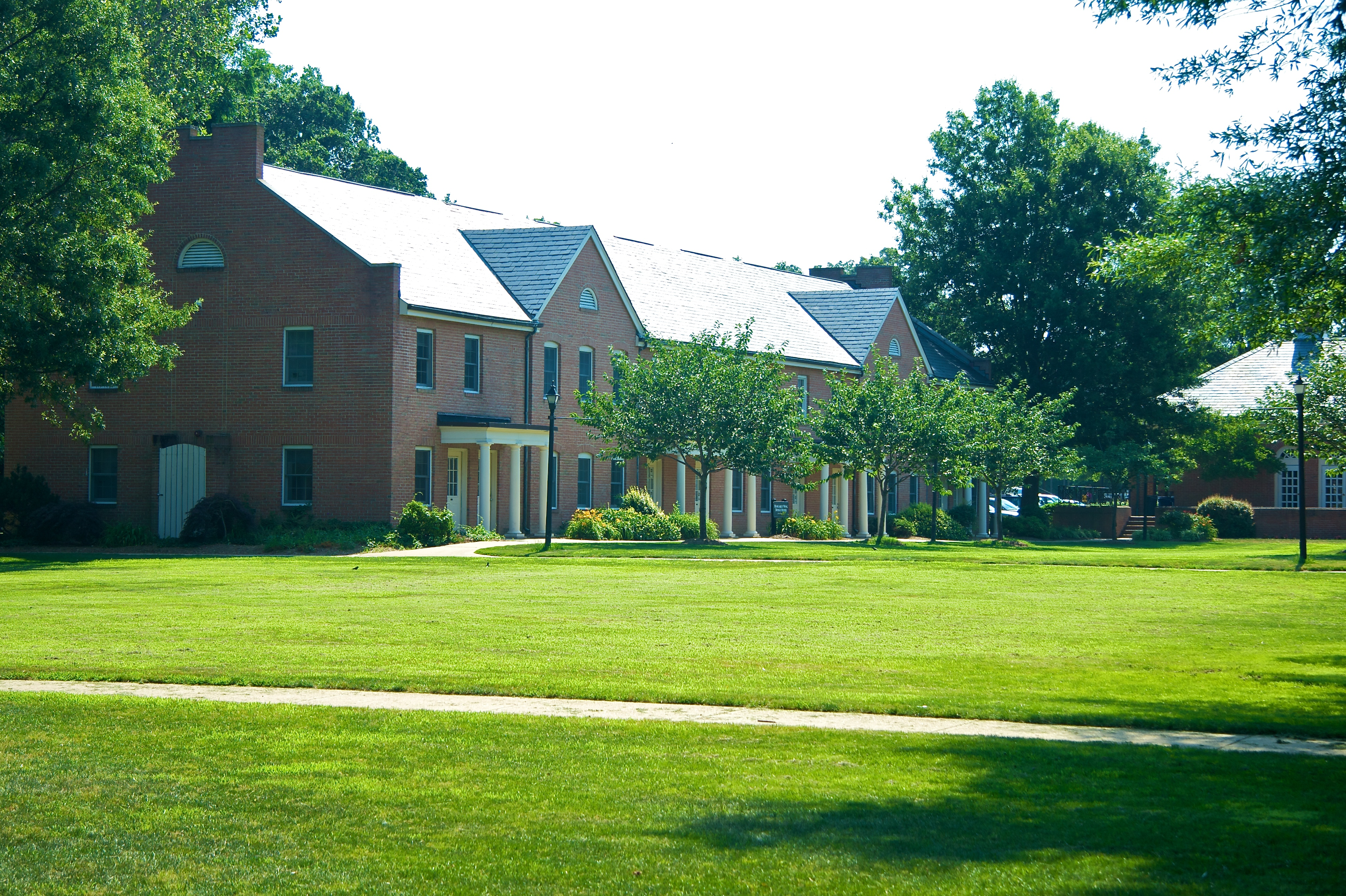
Student townhouses

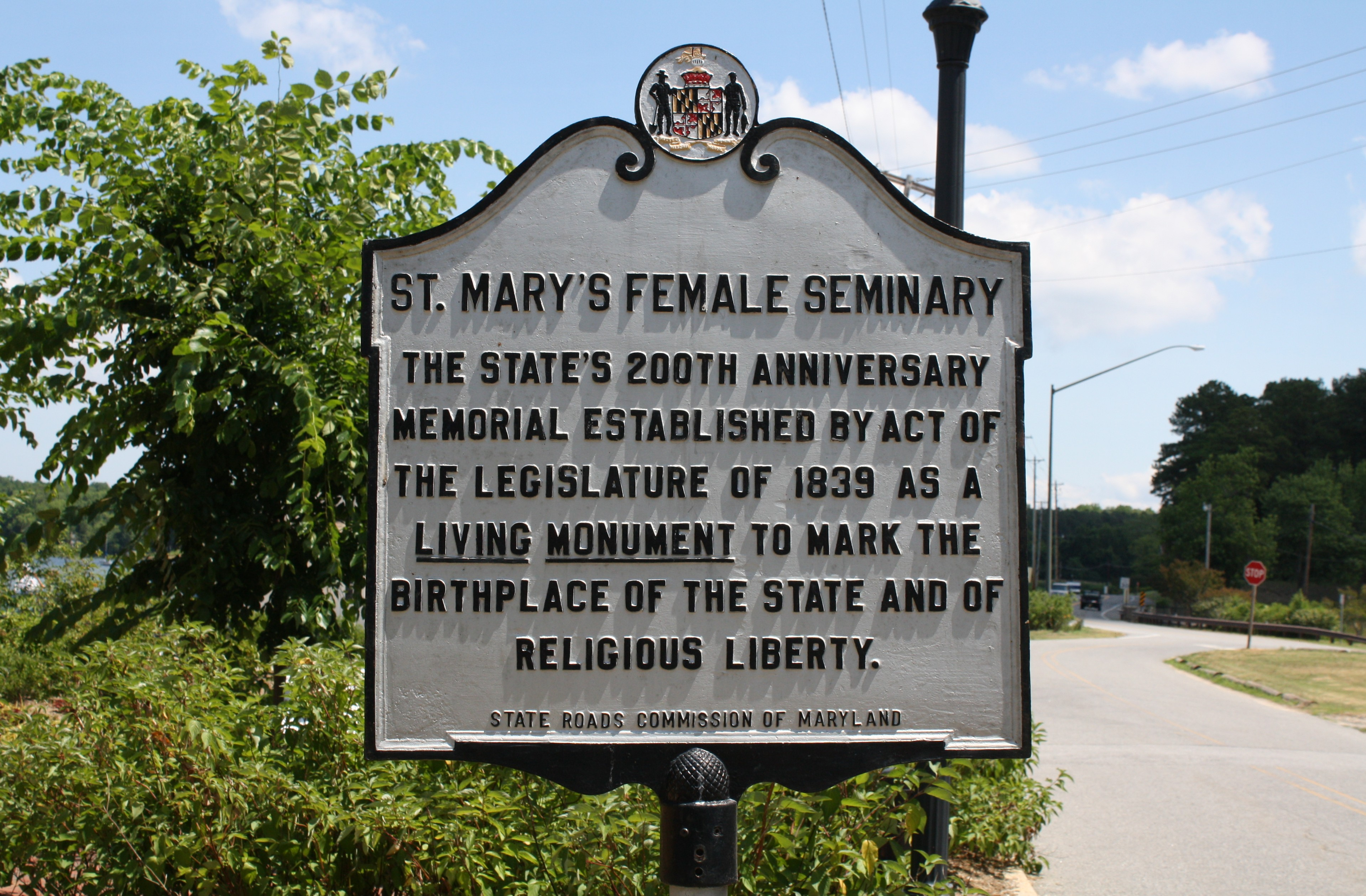
Historic Monument sign

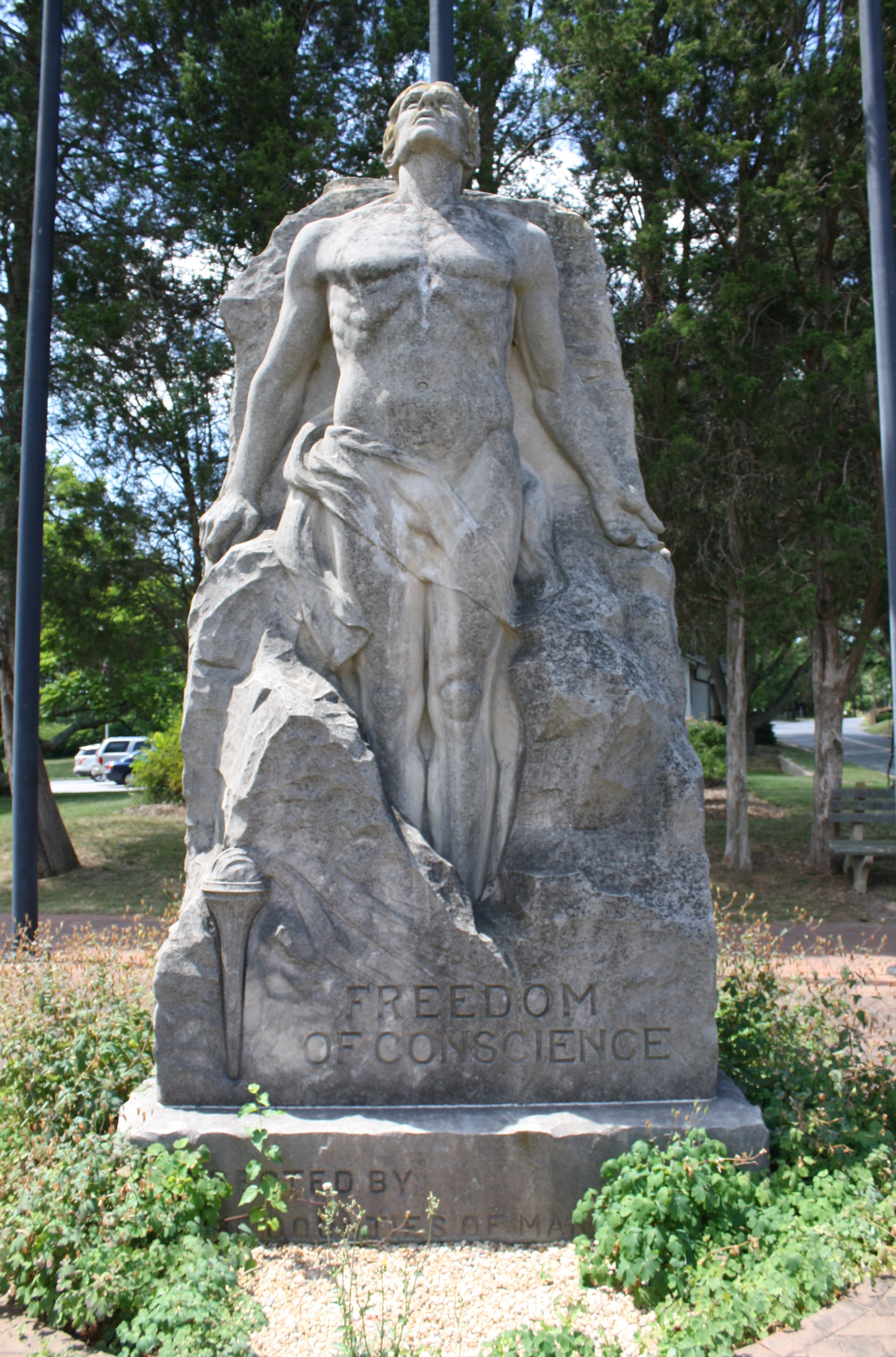
Freedom of conscience statue

== Athletics ==
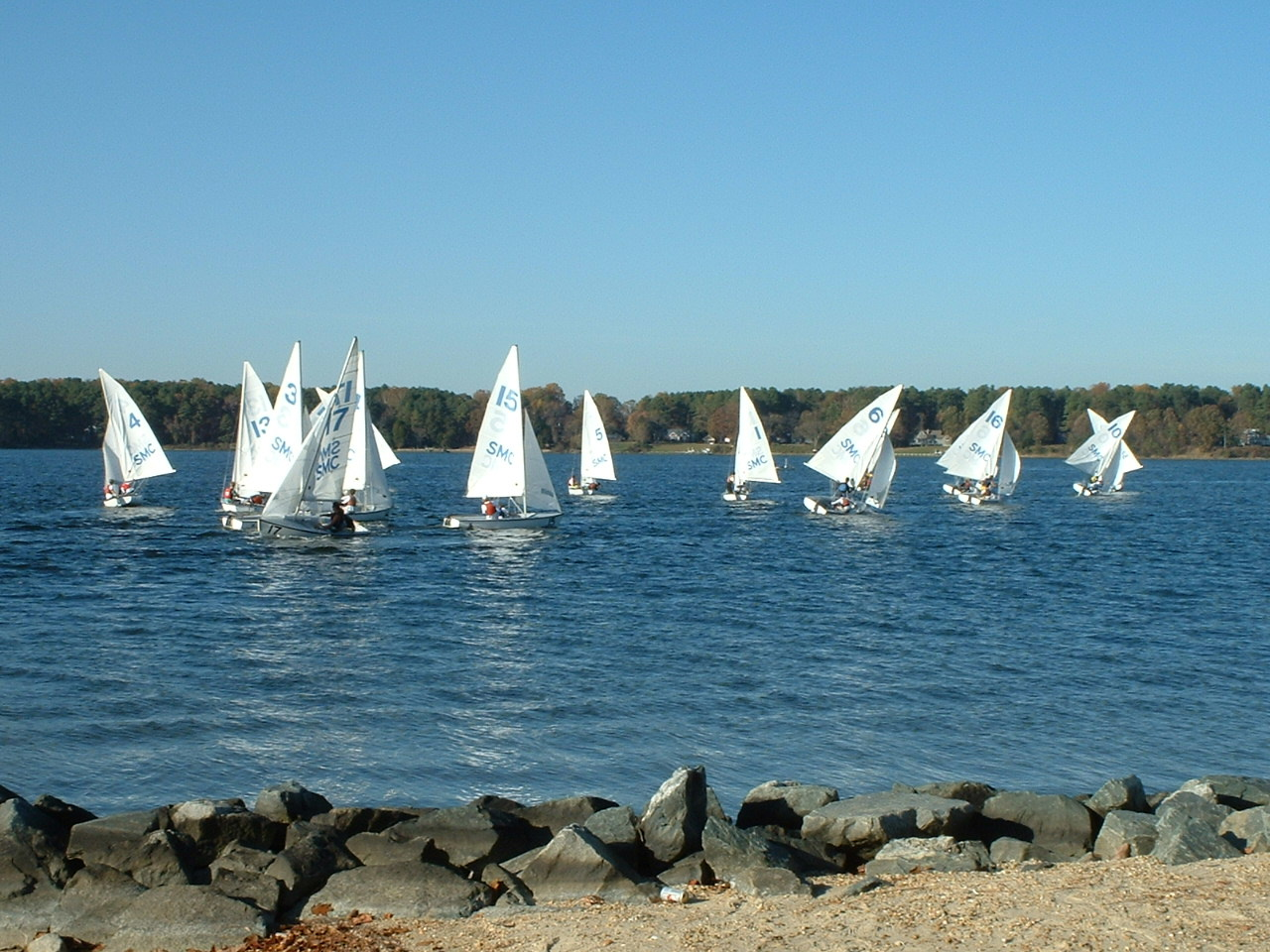
Sailing team

St. Mary's College teams participate as a member of the National Collegiate Athletic Association's Division III. The Seahawks are a member of the United East Conference. Prior to July 2021, the Seahawks belonged to the Coast to Coast Athletic Conference.

Between 2006 and 2020, at least 48% of Seahawk student-athletes were named to the Capital Athletic Conference's All-Academic team.

St. Mary's College's mascot is the Seahawk, which is a nickname for the osprey. The St. Mary's College Seahawk mascot is named Solomon.

== Student life ==
Undergraduate demographics as of Fall 2023
Race and ethnicity	Total
White	70%
Black	11%
Hispanic	8%
Two or more races	6%
Asian	3%
Unknown	1%
Economic diversity
Low-income (Note: The percentage of students who received an income-based federal Pell grant intended for low-income students.)	20%
Affluent (Note: The percentage of students who are a part of the American middle class at the bare minimum.)	80%

=== Housing ===
Approximately 1,600 students live on campus and in traditional-style residence halls, and about 300 students commute.

On campus living includes dorms, suites, apartments, and townhouses. Within the residences there are four living-learning centers on campus: an International Languages & Cultures (ILC) House; a Women In Science House (WISH). Furthermore, there are Substance and Alcohol Free Environment (SAFE) suites and apartments on campus, as well as part of a residence hall.

The majority of the on-campus student population lives in traditional college dormitories, group suite apartments and townhouses; 85% of students live on campus.

St. Mary's College does not have any social sororities or fraternities. Instead, part of its student residences run on a house system. Each house has its own educational theme, so residents may form community around shared interests.

Campus residence houses include:

- Women In Science House (WISH)
- Furthermore, there are Substance and Alcohol-Free Environment (SAFE) suites and apartments on campus, as well as part of a residence hall.
- Open Housing, for transgender and nonbinary students, and other students not wishing to live in same-sex or same-gender dorm housing.

=== Student participation in governance ===
St. Mary's College of Maryland has an active Student Government Association (SGA). The SGA charters clubs, promotes campus events and activities, works closely with the administration to help guide student-related policy, and works to promote student engagement in campus life through representation and programming. Senators, elected by the student body, represent constituents divided by housing (or commuters). The executive board (president, vice president, treasurer, etc.) are also elected by the student body.

The student trustee, a voting member of the board of trustees and an ex officio member of the SGA, is chosen from among the students to act as a direct link between the student body and the board of trustees. Aside from the student trustee position, students also participate in numerous other committees with faculty and other members of the administration.

=== Honors organizations ===
- Alpha Kappa Delta (sociology)
- Beta Beta Beta (biology)
- Omicron Delta Epsilon (economics)
- Omicron Delta Kappa
- Phi Alpha Theta (history)
- Phi Beta Kappa (national)
- Pi Sigma Alpha (political science)
- Psi Chi (psychology)
- Sigma Pi Sigma (physics)
- Sigma Tau Delta (English)

=== Seven Wonders ===
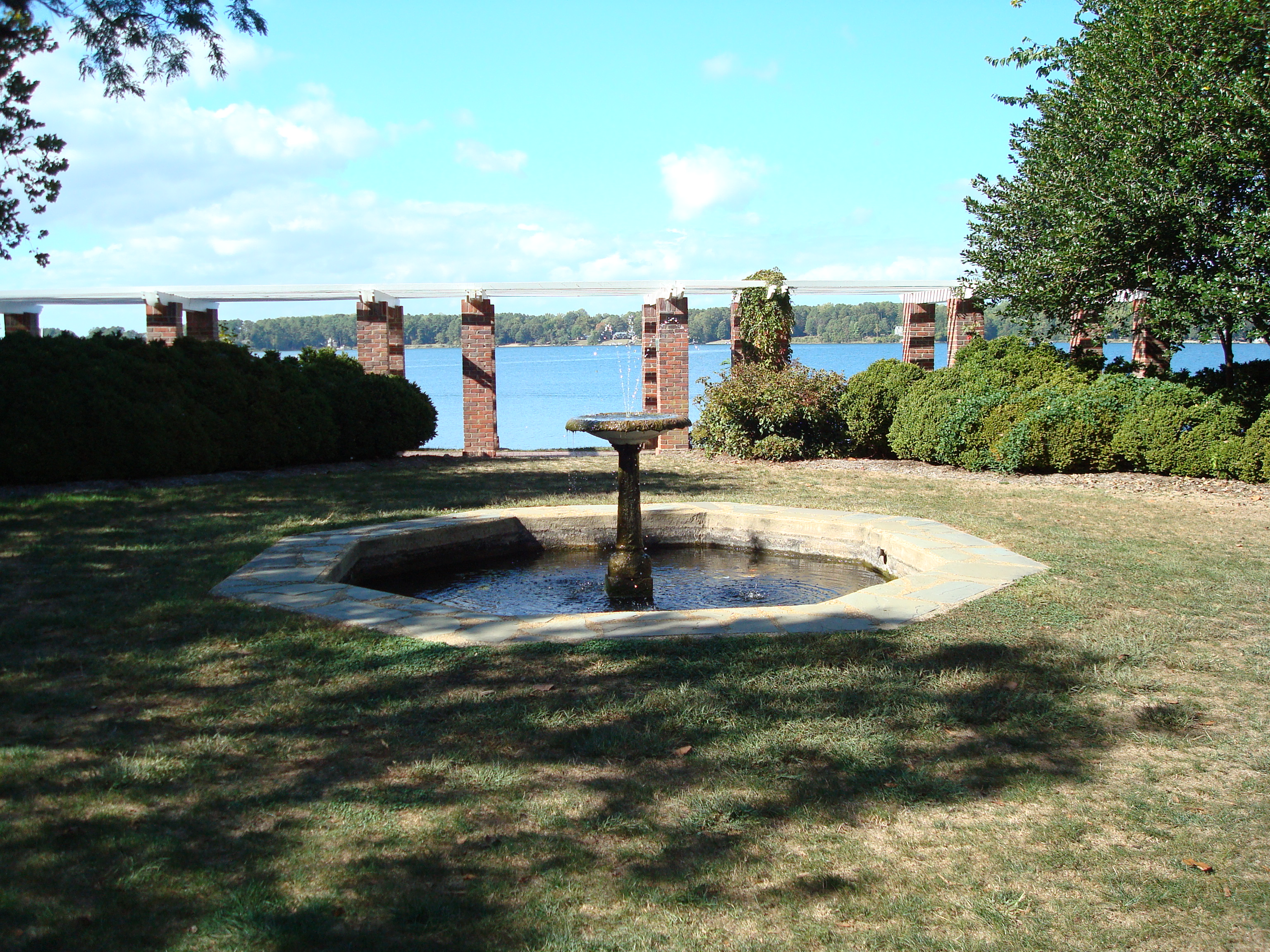
The Garden of Remembrance, one of the campus "Seven Wonders" and a popular spot for weddings

The Seven Wonders are seven notable campus landmarks. New students are inducted into the traditions of SMCM by orientation leaders in a tour of the Seven Wonders during orientation.

The seven "wonders" are:

1. The Shoe Tree
2. The Bell Tower
3. A clearing on St. John's Pond on the Side of Queen Ann (see above)
4. Maryland Freedom of Conscience Statue on Route 5 (a.k.a. The Naked Man)
5. Garden of Remembrance Fountain
6. "Hidden" Grave
7. Church Point

== Sustainability ==
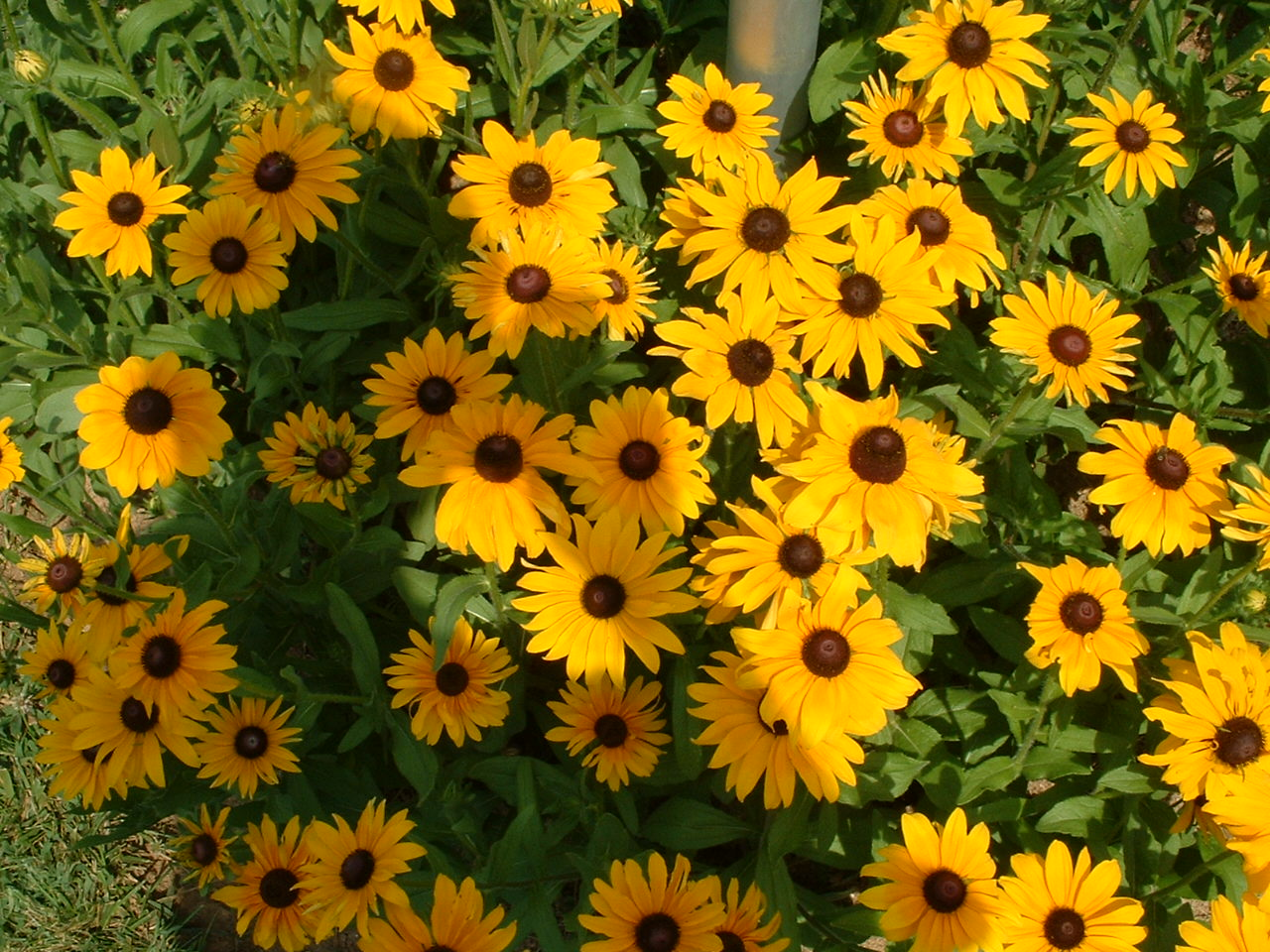
Black-eyed Susans, the state flower of Maryland. Seed packets of black eyed Susans are given out at some St. Mary's College ceremonies and students are encouraged to plant them around the campus.

The college runs a composting system to handle the majority of its biodegradable waste. St. Mary's College is transitioning to 100% environmentally responsible Green Seal certified cleaning products.

Goodpaster Hall, an academic building devoted to chemistry, psychology, and educational studies that opened in January 2008, was built to a Leadership in Energy and Environmental Design (LEED) rating of Silver, and is one of few "green" buildings in the state of Maryland.

St. Mary's College's groundskeeping crews implement sustainable practices, including protecting the St. Mary's River by developing green buffer areas, creating green spaces and wildlife habitat, using integrated pest management and minimizing synthetic fertilizers. SMCM has applied to the Audubon Cooperative Sanctuary Program.

St. Mary's College is expanding its recycling and composting programs. Student volunteers have been collecting recyclable and compostable material from the residences. Compostable bins will soon be available all across campus.

=== Energy conservation ===
St. Mary's College students voted to create a Green Energy Fund by raising student fees $25 per year. The purpose of the Green Energy Fund is to purchase Renewable Energy Credits to offset 100% of the college's electricity use and fund renewable energy projects on campus. St. Mary's College received the 2008 EPA Green Power Leadership Club award for their efforts.

== Notable alumni ==
- Chris Segal 2005, Major League Baseball umpire
- Kay Aldridge 1934, actor and model
- Alan Bean, astronaut and artist, took art classes at SMCM while attending the U.S. Naval Test Pilot School
- Emily Clayton Bishop 1900, sculptor
- Greg Boyer, trombonist
- Maria Briscoe Croker 1891, first poet laureate of Maryland
- Julie Croteau 1993, first woman to play and coach men's NCAA baseball
- E-Dubble, 2005, Rap/hip-hop artist
- Dan Engelstad, head coach Mount St. Mary's Mountaineers men's basketball
- Tom Everhart, artist
- Jay Fleming, photographer
- David Fraser-Hidalgo 1992, Maryland House of Delegates, District 15, Montgomery County
- Rosewell Hobart Graves 1853, Medical and Christian Missionary
- Ryan Grim, journalist
- Quentin Hillsman, head women's college basketball coach for the Syracuse Orange
- Jesse Kirkland, Olympic Men's Sailing 49er representing Bermuda in 2012
- Bruce Merritt 1984, Olympic sprint canoeist
- Anna Ranta, professor of neurology in New Zealand
- Brandon Scott, 2006, Mayor of Baltimore
- John F. Slade III 1967, Associate Judge, 4th District Court of Maryland; Maryland House of Delegates District 29C
- Paul Reed Smith, luthier, founder of PRS Guitars
- Scott Steele 1981, Olympic silver medal winner, windsurfing
- Ashani Weeraratna, cancer researcher
- Robert White (Washington, D.C., politician), 2004, Delegate-elect to the U.S. House of Representatives from the District of Columbia's at-large district
