= Women in philosophy =

Philosophical discourse by women

Women have made significant contributions to philosophy throughout the history of the discipline. Ancient examples of female philosophers include Maitreyi (1000 BCE), Gargi Vachaknavi (700 BCE), Hipparchia of Maroneia (active c. 325 BCE) and Arete of Cyrene (active 5th–4th centuries BCE). Some women philosophers were accepted during the medieval and modern eras, but none became part of the Western canon until the 20th and 21st century, when some sources began to accept philosophers like Simone Weil, Susanne Langer, G.E.M. Anscombe, Hannah Arendt, and Simone de Beauvoir into the canon.

Despite women participating in philosophy throughout history, there exists a gender imbalance in academic philosophy. This can be attributed to implicit biases against women. Women have had to overcome workplace obstacles like sexual harassment or having their work overlooked or stolen by men. Racial and ethnic minorities are underrepresented in the field of philosophy as well. Minorities and Philosophy (MAP), the American Philosophical Association, and the Society for Women in Philosophy are all organizations trying to fix the gender imbalance in academic philosophy.

In the early 1800s, some colleges and universities in the UK and US began admitting women, producing more female academics. Nevertheless, U.S. Department of Education reports from the 1990s indicate that few women ended up in philosophy, and that philosophy is one of the least gender-proportionate fields in the humanities. Women make up as little as 17% of philosophy faculty in some studies. In 2014, Inside Higher Education described the philosophy "...discipline's own long history of misogyny and sexual harassment" of women students and professors. Jennifer Saul, a professor of philosophy at the University of Sheffield, stated in 2015 that women are "...leaving philosophy after being harassed, assaulted, or retaliated against."

In the early 1990s, the Canadian Philosophical Association claimed that there is gender imbalance and gender bias in the academic field of philosophy. In June 2013, a US sociology professor stated that "out of all recent citations in four prestigious philosophy journals, female authors comprise just 3.6 percent of the total." The editors of the Stanford Encyclopedia of Philosophy have raised concerns about the underrepresentation of women philosophers, and they require editors and writers to ensure they represent the contributions of women philosophers. According to Eugene Sun Park, "[p]hilosophy is predominantly white and predominantly male. This homogeneity exists in almost all aspects and at all levels of the discipline." Susan Price argues that the "canon remains dominated by white males—the discipline that... still hews to the myth that genius is tied to gender." According to Saul, philosophy, the oldest of the humanities, is also the malest (and the whitest). While other areas of the humanities are at or near gender parity, philosophy remains more overwhelmingly male than even mathematics.

== History ==
While there were women philosophers since the earliest times, and some were accepted as philosophers during their lives, very few woman philosophers have entered the philosophical Western canon. Historians of philosophy are faced with two main problems. The first being the exclusion of women philosophers from history and philosophy texts, which leads to a lack of knowledge about women philosophers among philosophy students. The second problem deals with what the canonical philosophers had to say about philosophy and women's place in it. In the past twenty-five years there has been an exponential increase in feminist writing about the history of philosophy and what has been considered the philosophical canon.

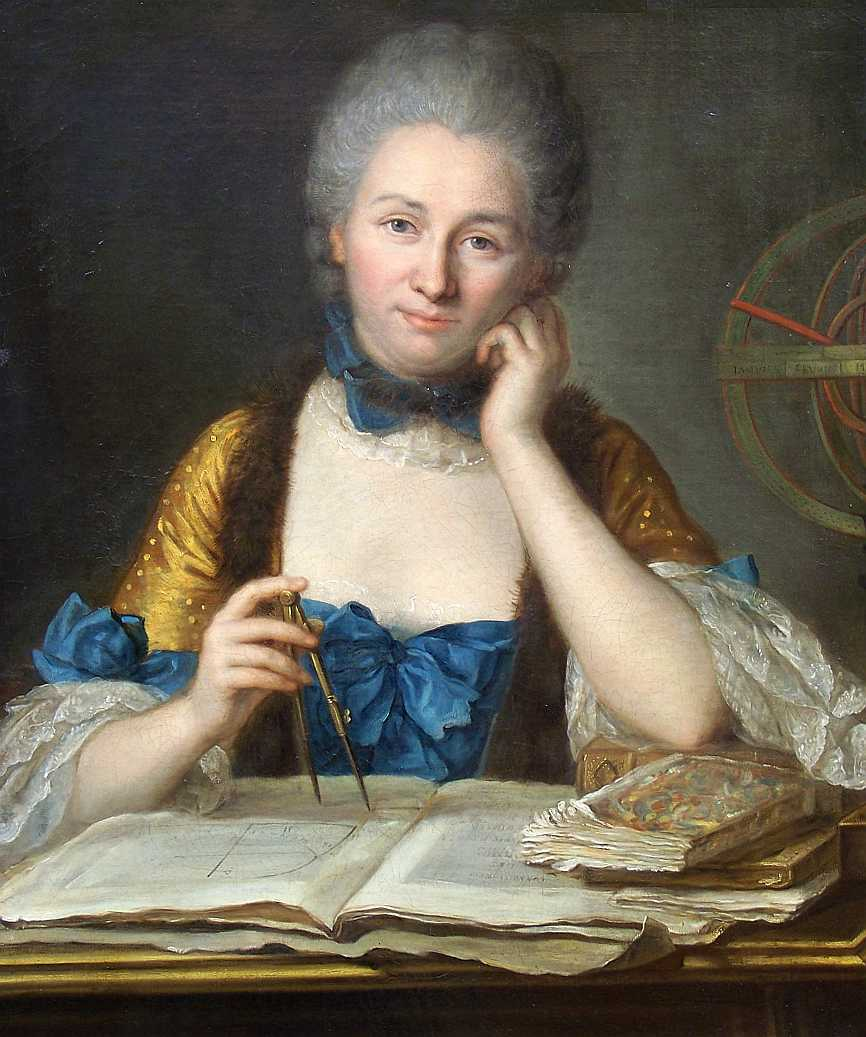
Émilie du Châtelet (1706–1749)

In the May 13, 2015 issue of The Atlantic, Susan Price notes that even though Kant's first work in 1747 cites Émilie Du Châtelet, a philosopher who was a "...scholar of Newton, religion, science, and mathematics", "her work won't be found in the 1,000-plus pages of the new edition of The Norton Introduction to Philosophy." The Norton Introduction does not name a female philosopher until the book begins to cover the mid-20th century. Scholars argue that women philosophers are also absent from the "...other leading anthologies used in university classrooms." Price states that university philosophy anthologies do not usually mention 17th century women philosophers such as Margaret Cavendish, Anne Conway, and Lady Damaris Masham. Price argues that the philosophical "...canon remains dominated by white males—the discipline that some say still hews to the myth that genius is tied to gender." Amy Ferrer, executive director of the American Philosophical Association, states that "...women have been systematically left out of the canon, and that women coming in have not been able to see how much influence women have had in the field." The Encyclopedia of Philosophy, which was published in 1967, had "...articles on over 900 philosophers, [but it] did not include an entry for Wollstonecraft, Arendt or de Beauvoir. "[T]hese women philosophers were scarcely even marginal" to the canon set out at the time.

In the Aeon essay "First women of philosophy" in December 2018, the global historian of ideas Dag Herbjørnsrud writes about the many women philosophers of the Global South, and concludes: "Philosophy was once a woman's world, ranging across Asia, Africa and Latin America. It's time to reclaim that lost realm." Herbjørnsrud argues that women and philosophers of color were excluded from the philosophical canon by Kant, Hegel and their supporters.

=== Ancient philosophy ===
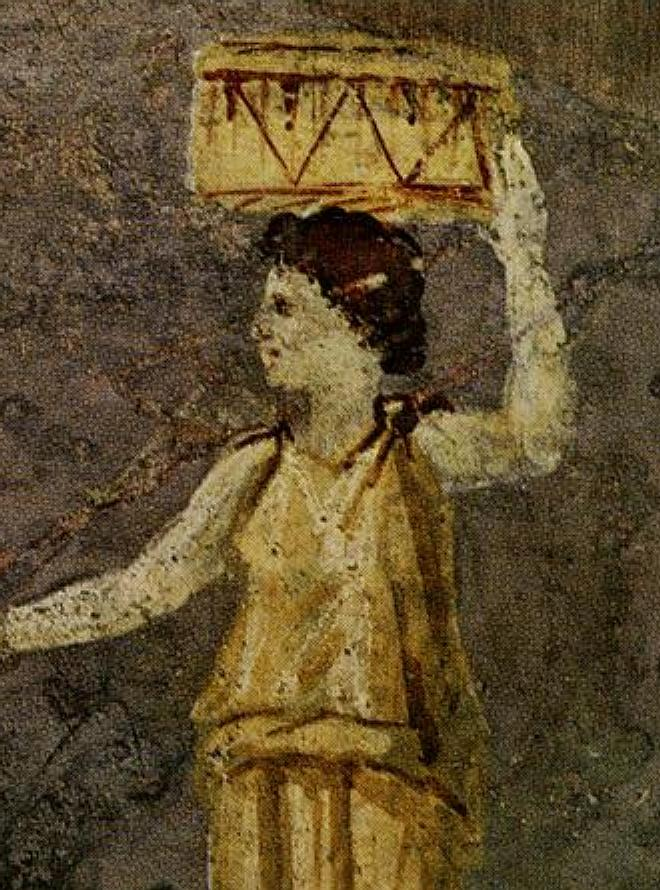
Hipparchia of Maroneia. Detail from a Roman wall painting in the Villa Farnesina in Rome.

Some of the earliest philosophers were women, such as Hipparchia of Maroneia (active ca. 325 BC), Arete of Cyrene (active 5th–4th century BC) and Aspasia of Miletus (470–400 BC). Aspasia appears in the philosophical writings of Plato, Xenophon, Aeschines Socraticus and Antisthenes. Some scholars argue that Plato was impressed by her intelligence and wit and based his character Diotima in the Symposium on her. Socrates attributes to the (possibly fictional) Diotima of Mantinea his lessons in the art of Eros (or philosophical searching). Plato's final views on women are highly contested, but the Republic suggests that Plato thought women to be equally capable of education, intellectual vision, and rule of the city.

==== Ancient eastern philosophy ====
In ancient philosophy in Asia, women made many vital contributions. In the oldest text of the Upanishads, c. 700 BCE, the female philosophers Gargi and Maitreyi are part of the philosophical dialogues with the sage Yajnavalkya. Ubhaya Bharati (c. 800 AD) and Akka Mahadevi (1130–1160) are other known female thinkers in the Indian philosophical tradition. In China, Confucius hailed Jing Jiang of Lu (5th c. BCE) as being wise and an example for his students, while Ban Zhao (45–116) wrote several vital historical and philosophical texts. In Korea, Im Yunjidang (1721–93) were among the most notable women philosophers during the enlightened mid-Chosŏn era. Among notable female Muslim philosophers are Rabia of Basra (714–801), A'ishah al-Ba'uniyyah of Damascus (died 1517), and Nana Asma’u (1793–1864) from the Sokoto Caliphate of today's Nigeria.

Some notable female philosophers of this era include:

- Ban Zhao (c. 45–116 AD)^{D2}
- Xie Daoyun (before 340 AD – after 399 AD)
- Gargi Vachaknavi (7th century BC)

==== Ancient western philosophy ====
In ancient Western philosophy, while academic philosophy was typically the domain of male philosophers such as Plato and Aristotle, female philosophers such as Hipparchia of Maroneia (active ca. 325 BC), Arete of Cyrene (active 5th–4th century BC) and Aspasia of Miletus (470–400 BC) were active during this period. Unfortunately, we don't know how many female authors ever existed in Ancient Greece, the Hellenistic period or the Roman age, as most of the ancient literature is forever lost (up to 99%).

In the Roman Empire, empresses and female members of the aristocracy, or knights class, were frequently protectors of male and female artists. Hypatia (AD 350 – 370 to 415) was a mathematician, astronomer, and philosopher in Egypt, then a part of the Eastern Roman Empire. She was the head of the Neoplatonic school at Alexandria, where she taught philosophy and astronomy.

Some notable female philosophers of this era include:

- Theano of Croton (6th century BC)
- Aristoclea of Delphi (6th century BC)
- Perictione (5th century BC)
- Sosipatra of Ephesus (4th century AD)
- Nicarete of Megara (flourished around 300 BC)
- Cornelia (mother of the Gracchi) (2nd century BC)
- Catherine of Alexandria (282-305 AD)
- Phintys (3rd century BC)
- Ptolemais of Cyrene (3rd century BC)
- Aesara of Lucania (3rd century BC)
- Diotima of Mantinea (appears in Plato's Symposium)
- Pompeia Plotina (2nd century AD)

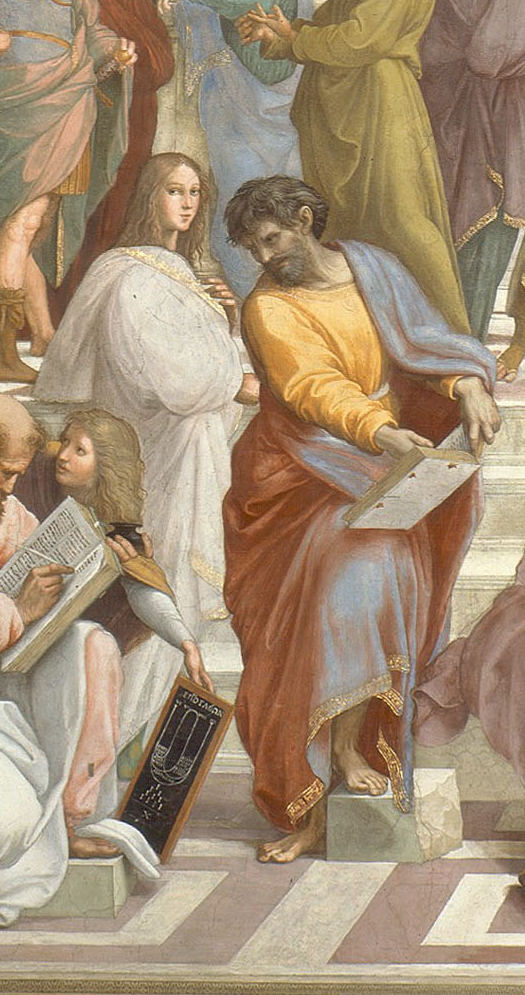
Hypatia in the School of Athens with the most prominent ancient philosophers, Raphael, 1510

=== Medieval philosophy ===
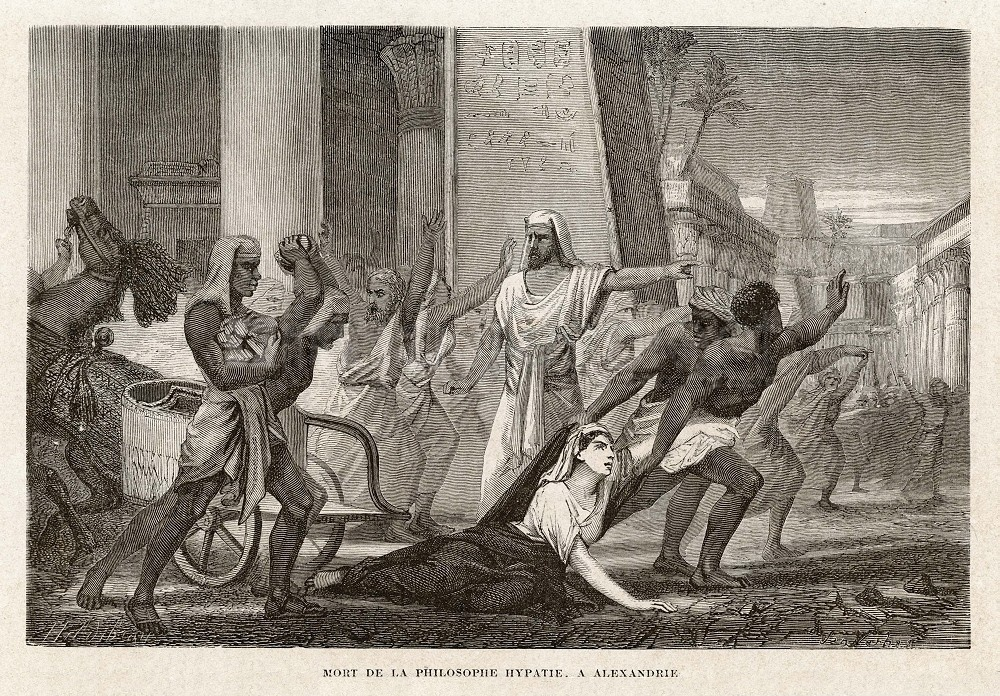
"Death of the philosopher Hypatia, in Alexandria" (she was killed by an angry mob) – artwork by Louis Figuier (1866).

Medieval philosophy dates from the fall of the Western Roman Empire in the 5th century AD to the Renaissance in the 16th century. In this age, it was common as well for prominent women belonging to the aristocracy to defend and finance intellectuals.

Some notable woman philosophers of this era include:

- Aedesia of Alexandria (5th century AD)
- Heloïse of Argenteuil (c. 1100–1164), French philosopher, advocate of adequate education for nuns
- Dobrodeia of Kiev (1108–1131)
- St. Hildegard of Bingen (1098–1179)
- Catherine of Siena (1347–1380)
- Christine de Pizan (1364 – c. 1430)
- Tullia d'Aragona (c. 1510 – 1556)
- Moderata Fonte (1555–1592), critic of religion, feminist
- Lucrezia Marinella (1571–1653)

=== Modern philosophy ===
The 17th century marks the beginning of the modern philosophy era, which ended in the early 20th century. During the 17th century, various women philosophers argued for the importance of education for women and two women philosophers influenced René Descartes and during the early part of the 18th century, two women philosophers commented on John Locke's philosophy. Laura Bassi (1711–1778) was the first woman to earn a university chair in a scientific field. Olympe de Gouges (1748–1793) demanded that French women be given the same rights as men, a position also taken by Judith Sargent Murray (1751–1820) in her essay "On the Equality of the Sexes" and Mary Wollstonecraft (1759–97) in her essay A Vindication of the Rights of Woman (1792). During the 19th century, Harriet Martineau (1802–1876) criticized the state of women's education and Harriet Taylor Mill (1807–1858), Sarah Margaret Fuller (1810–1850) and Antoinette Brown Blackwell (1825–1921) called for women's rights. Charlotte Perkins Gilman (1860–1935) argued that women were oppressed by an androcentric culture. Near the start of the 20th century, Mary Whiton Calkins (1863–1930) was the first woman to become president of the American Philosophical Association. Women thinkers such as Emma Goldman (1869–1940), an anarchist, and Rosa Luxemburg (1871–1919), a Marxist theorist, are known for their political views. Influential contemporary philosophers include Edith Stein (1891–1942), Susanne Langer (1895–1985), Hannah Arendt (1906–1975), Simone de Beauvoir (1908–1986), Elizabeth Anscombe (1919–2001), Mary Midgley (1919–2018), Philippa Foot (1920–2010), Mary Warnock (1924–2019), Julia Kristeva (born 1941), Patricia Churchland (born 1943) Martha Nussbaum (born 1947) and Susan Haack (born 1945).

==== 17th century ====
- Marie de Gournay (1565–1645) was a critic of religion, proto-feminist, translator and novelist who insisted that women should be educated.
- Anna Maria van Schurman (1607–1678) was a multilinguist known for her defense of female education.
- Elisabeth of Bohemia (1618–1680) influenced many key figures and philosophers, most notably René Descartes, who she corresponded with. She questioned Descartes' idea of dualism, or the mind being separate from the body, and his theories regarding communication between the mind and body.
- Margaret Cavendish (1623–1673) was a philosopher and writer who addressed gender, power, manners, scientific methods, and philosophy.
- Anne Conway (1631–1679) was an English philosopher whose work, in the tradition of the Cambridge Platonists, was an influence on Leibniz. Conway's thought is original as it is rationalist philosophy, with hallmarks of gynocentric concerns and patterns, and in that sense it was unique among seventeenth-century systems.
- Gabrielle Suchon (1632–1703), French philosopher of education
- In early colonial Latin-America, the philosopher Sor Juana Inés de la Cruz (1651–95) was known as "The Phoenix of America".
- Damaris Cudworth Masham (1659–1708) was an English philosopher, proto-feminist, and advocate for women's education.
- Mary Astell (1666–1731) was an English feminist writer and rhetorician known for advocacy of equal educational opportunities for women, which earned her the title of "first English feminist." Her most well known books outline her plan to establish a new type of educational institution for women.

==== 18th century ====
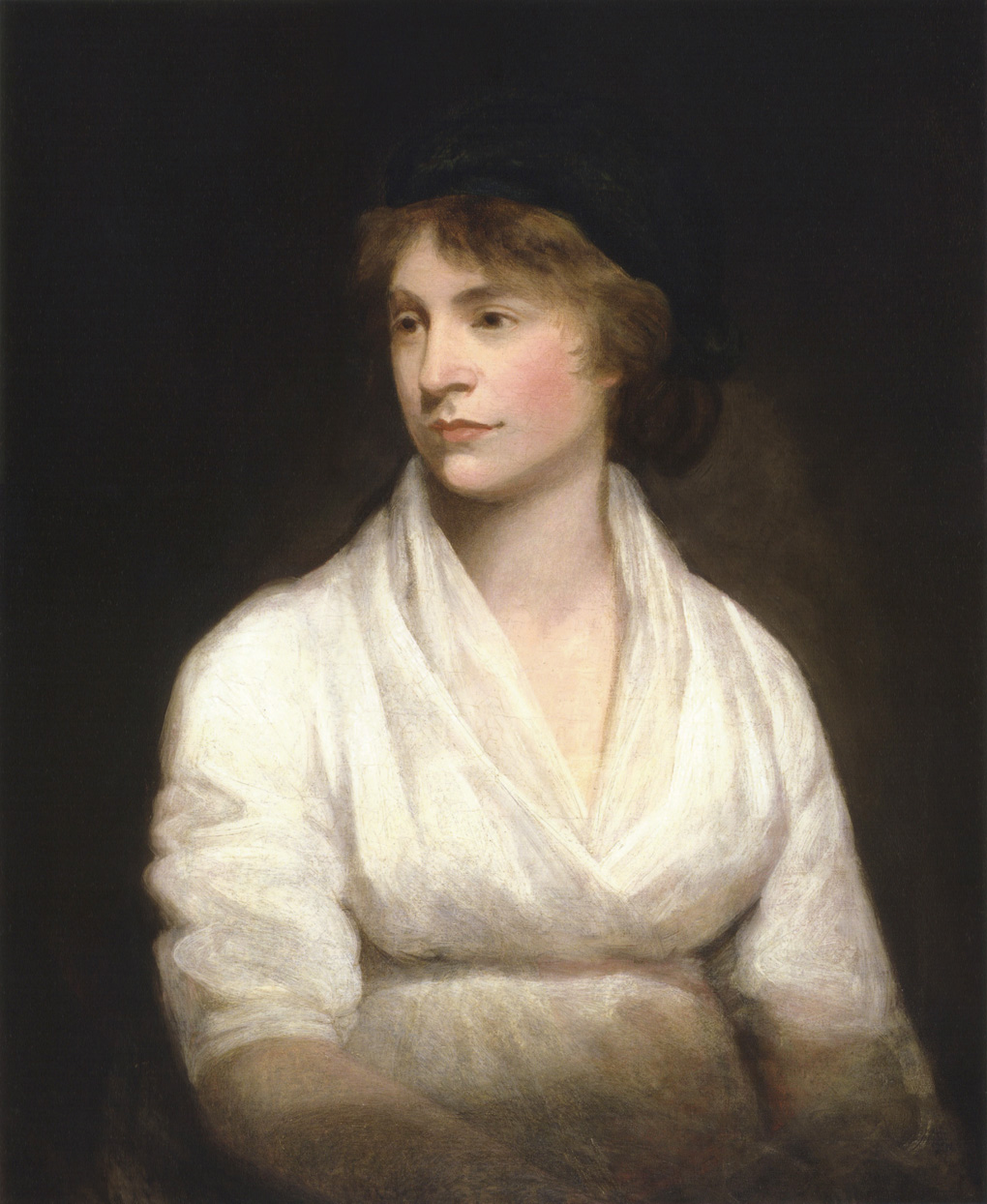
Mary Wollstonecraft (1759–1797) was an English writer and philosopher.

- Catharine Trotter Cockburn (1679–1749) published her first major philosophical work, A Defence of Mr. Lock[e]'s An Essay Concerning Human Understanding in 1702, at the age of 23. Much of the scholarly interest in her writing centres on gender studies.
- Émilie du Châtelet (1706–1749) was a French mathematician, physicist, and author during the Age of Enlightenment. She translated and commented on Isaac Newton's work Philosophiae Naturalis Principia Mathematica. She criticized John Locke's philosophy and emphasizes the necessity of the verification of knowledge through experience. She also theorized about free will and on the way to do metaphysics.
- Laura Bassi (1711–1778) was an Italian philosopher and physicist who was the first woman in the world to earn a university chair in a scientific field of studies. She received a doctoral degree from the University of Bologna in May 1732, the third academic qualification ever bestowed on a woman by a university, and the first woman to earn a professorship in physics at a university in Europe. She was the first woman to be offered an official teaching position at a university in Europe.
- Catharine Macaulay (1731–1791) was an English historian and writer. She attacked Edmund Burke's Thoughts on the Cause of the Present Discontents, calling it "a poison...". In her 1790 Letters on Education, she argued along the lines that Mary Wollstonecraft would do in 1792, that the apparent weakness of women was due to their mis-education.
- Im Yunjidang (1721–1793) was a Korean writer and neo-Confucian philosopher.
- Olympe de Gouges (1748–1793) was a French playwright and political activist whose feminist and abolitionist writings reached a large audience. She was an early feminist who demanded that French women be given the same rights as French men. In her Declaration of the Rights of Woman and of the Female Citizen (1791), she challenged the practice of male authority and the notion of male–female inequality. She was executed by guillotine by the Revolutionary Tribunal because her views were deemed seditious.
- Judith Sargent Murray (1751–1820) was an early American advocate for women's rights, an essayist, playwright, poet, and letter writer. She was one of the first American proponents of the idea of the equality of the sexes—that women, like men, had the capability of intellectual accomplishment and should be able to achieve economic independence. Among many other influential pieces, her landmark essay "On the Equality of the Sexes" paved the way for new thoughts and ideas proposed by other feminist writers of the century. The essay predated Mary Wollstonecraft's A Vindication of the Rights of Woman which was published in 1792.
- Mary Wollstonecraft (1759–1797) was an English writer, philosopher, and advocate of women's rights. She is regarded as one of the founding feminist philosophers. In A Vindication of the Rights of Woman (1792), her most famous and influential work, she argues that women are not naturally inferior to men, but appear to be only because they lack education. She suggests that both men and women should be treated as rational beings and imagines a social order founded on reason.

==== 19th century ====
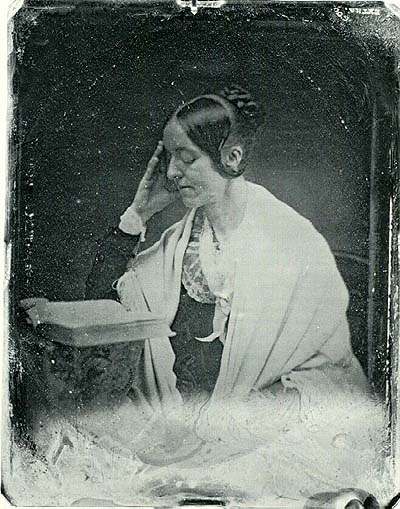
The only known daguerreotype of Margaret Fuller (by John Plumbe, 1846).

- Nana Asmaʼu (1793–1864) was a Nigerian poet and political writer, who supported the education of women.
- Marianna Florenzi (1802–1870) was an Italian marchioness (in Italian marchesa). Née Marianna Bacinetti, she was a writer, philosopher and translator of philosophical works. She was also known by her married name of Marianna Florenzi Waddington. She had a literary education and devoted herself to reading philosophical works and hosting cultural gatherings and salons. She was one of the first female students, studying natural sciences at the University of Perugia in the first half of the 19th century. She translated Leibniz's Monadology into Italian and also promoted the spread of works by Kant, Spinoza and Schelling (whose work Bruno she also translated) in Italian. Politically, she supported Italy's national-movement and in 1850 published Some reflections on socialism and communism, which (like many of her other works) ended up on the church's Index Librorum Prohibitorum.
- Harriet Martineau (1802–1876) was an English social theorist and political writer, often cited as the first female sociologist. However, her work ranges more widely than this; she wrote books and essays on philosophy, religion, society, history, politics, literature, biography, and many other forms. In Society in America, she criticised the state of women's education, stating that the "intellect of women is confined by an unjustifiable restriction" of access to education; she urged women to become well-educated and free. She also savagely criticised America for the contradiction between its liberal principles and its then practice of slavery.
- Harriet Taylor Mill (1807–1858) was a philosopher and women's rights advocate. In John Stuart Mill's autobiography, he claimed she was the joint author of most of the books and articles published under his name. He stated that "when two persons have their thoughts and speculations completely in common it is of little consequence, in respect of the question of originality, which of them holds the pen." Together, they wrote "Early Essays on Marriage and Divorce", published in 1832. The debate about the nature and extent of her collaboration is ongoing.
- Sarah Margaret Fuller (1810–1850) was an American journalist, critic, philosopher and women's rights advocate. Her book Woman in the Nineteenth Century is considered the first major feminist work in the United States. She was an advocate of women's rights and, in particular, women's education and the right to employment. Many other advocates for women's rights and feminism, including Susan B. Anthony, cite Fuller as a source of inspiration.
- Frances Power Cobbe (1822–1904) was a very well-known writer on philosophical and religious subjects in Victorian Britain, as well as a feminist and leading animal welfare campaigner. She was an intuitionist in ethics, a critic of Darwin and atheism, and addressed the full range of philosophical topics including philosophy of mind, aesthetics, history, death and personal immortality, and moral theory. In 1863, she set out a philosophical case for animal rights.
- Antoinette Brown Blackwell (1825–1921) was the first woman to be ordained as a mainstream Protestant minister in the United States. She was a well-versed public speaker on controversial issues such as abolition of slavery and she sought to expand women's rights. In 1873 Blackwell founded the Association for the Advancement of Women.
- Frances Julia Wedgwood (1833–1913) published from the 1860s to 1890s on the metaphysical, religious, and ethical implications of Darwin's theory of evolution; arguments for women's rights and suffrage; Biblical criticism; a large-scale account of the development of 'the moral ideal' across world civilisations; and Judaism's central contribution to European civilisation. Her works include The Moral Ideal in 1888.
- Victoria, Lady Welby (1837–1912) was a self-educated English philosopher of language. She published articles in the leading English language academic journals of the day, Mind and The Monist. She published her first philosophical book, What Is Meaning? Studies in the Development of Significance in 1903, following it with Significs and Language: The Articulate Form of Our Expressive and Interpretive Resources in 1911. Welby's concern with the problem of meaning included (perhaps especially) the everyday use of language, and she coined the word significs for her approach. Welby's theories on signification anticipated contemporary semantics, semiotics, and semiology.
- Vernon Lee (1856–1935) is best known for her many writings on aesthetics, including Belcaro (1881), 'Art and Life' (1896), and 'The Beautiful' (1913). She was associated with the aestheticist movement in the 1880s but went on to criticise it and reconnect beauty with goodness. She also wrote on ethical, religious, and political topics, including vivisection, evolution, atheism, and utilitarianism. She experimented with forms that straddled the boundary between philosophy and literature.
- Constance Naden (1858–89) defended induction in science, argued for atheism, and put forward the metaphysical system she called 'hylo-idealism', on which we can know only our own ideas and nothing outside them, yet these ideas are merely the products of our brains reacting to physical stimuli.
- Bertha von Suttner (1843–1914) was a Czech-Austrian pacifist and novelist. In 1905 she was the first woman to be awarded the Nobel Peace Prize. Suttner's pacifism was influenced by the writings of Immanuel Kant, Henry Thomas Buckle, Herbert Spencer, Charles Darwin and Leo Tolstoy (Tolstoy praised Die Waffen nieder!).
- Helene von Druskowitz (1856–1918) was an Austrian philosopher, writer and music critic. She was the second woman to obtain a Doctorate in Philosophy, which she obtained in Zürich. She usually published under a male alias because of the predominant sexism of the era.
- Charlotte Perkins Gilman (1860–1935) was an American feminist, sociologist, novelist, writer and social reformer. Her short story "The Yellow Wallpaper" became a bestseller. The story is about a woman who suffers from mental illness after three months of being closeted in a room by her husband. She argued that the domestic environment oppressed women through the patriarchal beliefs upheld by society. Gilman argued that women's contributions to civilization, throughout history, have been halted because of an androcentric culture. She argued that women were the underdeveloped half of humanity. She believed economic independence would bring freedom and equality for women.

==== Early 20th century ====
- Mary Whiton Calkins (1863–1930) was an American philosopher and psychologist. She was also the first woman to become president of the American Psychological Association and the American Philosophical Association. Calkins studied psychology under William James and studied at Harvard University, which allowed her to attend courses but refused to register her as a student, because she was a woman. She published her doctoral dissertation in 1896, and Harvard's Department of Philosophy and Psychology recommended that she be granted her PhD, but Harvard's president and board refused, as she was a woman. The president believed women should not study with men. James was astonished at the university's decision, as he described her performance as "the most brilliant examination for the Ph.D. that we have had at Harvard." She published four books and over one hundred papers in her career in psychology and philosophy. She was also an avid supporter of women's rights and an advocate of women's right to vote.
- Emma Goldman (1869–1940) was an anarchist known for her political activism, writing and speeches. She played a pivotal role in the development of anarchist political philosophy in the first half of the 20th century. She was viewed as a free-thinking "rebel woman" by admirers, and denounced by critics as an advocate of violent revolution. Her writing and lectures spanned a wide variety of issues, including atheism, freedom of speech, militarism, capitalism, marriage, free love, and homosexuality. Although she distanced herself from first-wave feminism and its efforts toward women's suffrage, she developed ways of incorporating gender politics into anarchism.
- Rosa Luxemburg (1871–1919) was a Marxist theorist, philosopher, economist and revolutionary socialist of Polish-Jewish descent. While Luxemburg defended Marx's materialism dialectics and his conception of history, she called for spontaneous grass roots-based class struggle.

=== Contemporary philosophy ===
Contemporary philosophy is the present period in the history of Western philosophy beginning at the end of the 19th century with the professionalization of the discipline and the rise of analytic and continental philosophy. Some influential women philosophers from this period include:

- Elizabeth Anscombe (1919–2001), usually cited as G. E. M. Anscombe, was a British analytic philosopher. Anscombe's 1958 article "Modern Moral Philosophy" introduced the term "consequentialism" into the language of analytic philosophy, and had a seminal influence on contemporary virtue ethics. Her monograph Intention is generally recognised as her greatest and most influential work, and the continuing philosophical interest in the concepts of intention, action and practical reasoning can be said to have taken its main impetus from this work. Mary Warnock described her in 2006 as "the undoubted giant among women philosophers" while John Haldane said she "certainly has a good claim to be the greatest woman philosopher of whom we know".
- Hannah Arendt (1906–1975) was a German-born American assimilated Jewish political theorist. Though often described as a philosopher, she rejected that label on the grounds that philosophy is concerned with "man in the singular" and instead described herself as a political theorist because her work centers on the fact that "men, not Man, live on the earth and inhabit the world." Her works deal with the nature of power, and the subjects of politics, direct democracy, authority, and totalitarianism. The Hannah Arendt Prize is named in her honor.
- María Zambrano (1904–1991) was a Spanish philosopher and essayist known for developing razón poética ("poetic reason") — a philosophy that integrated reason with poetry, imagination, and dreams. Forced into exile during the Franco dictatorship, she wrote prolifically across four decades abroad before returning to Spain in 1984. In 1988, she became the first woman to receive the Miguel de Cervantes Prize, the highest literary honor in the Spanish-speaking world.
- Susanne Langer (1895–1985) was an American philosopher of mind and of philosopher of art, who was influenced by Ernst Cassirer and Alfred North Whitehead. She was one of the first women to achieve an academic career in philosophy and the first woman to be popularly and professionally recognized as an American philosopher. Langer is best known for her 1942 book entitled Philosophy in a New Key. It argued that there is a basic and pervasive human need to symbolize, to invent meanings, and to invest meanings in one's world.

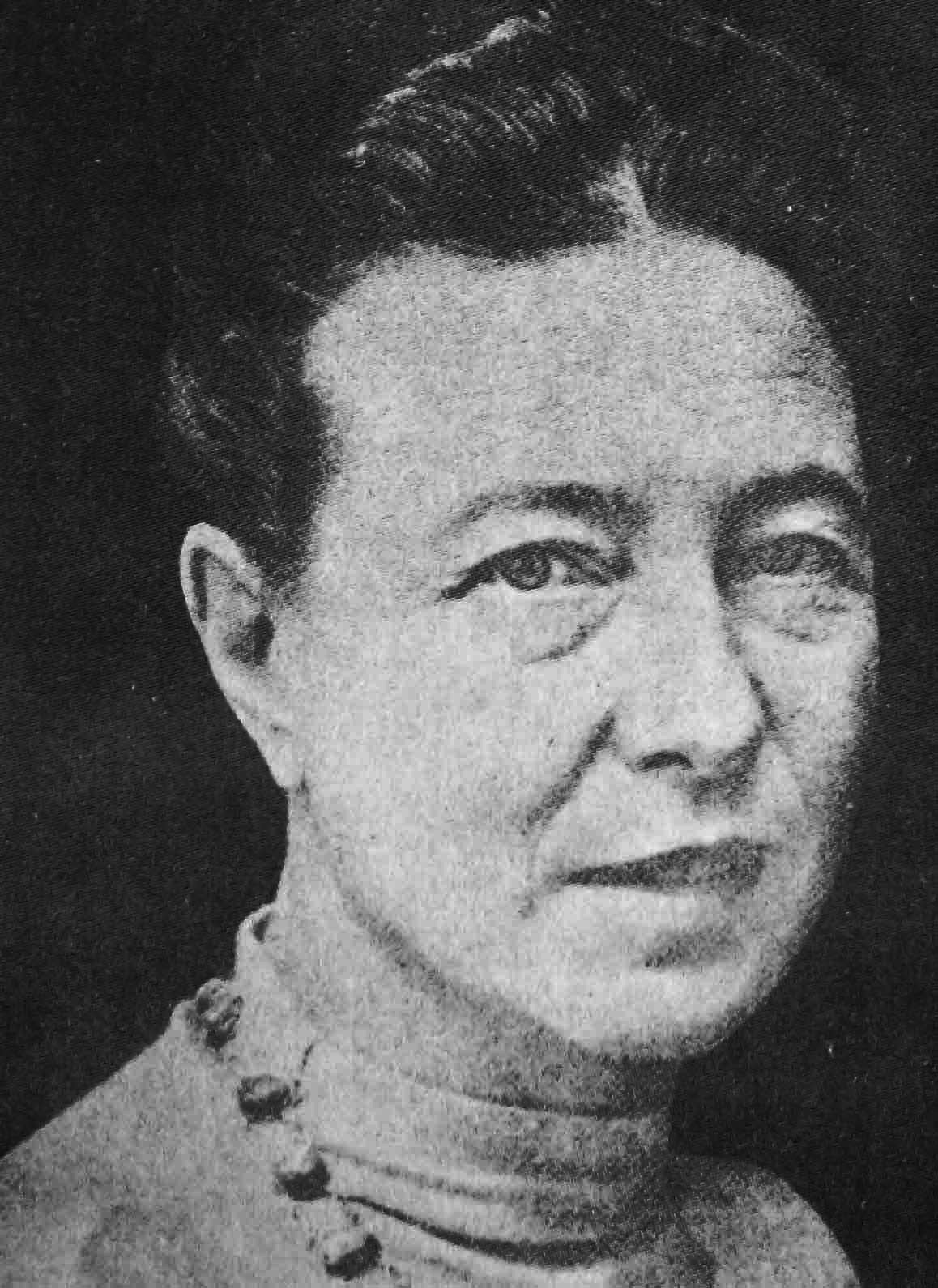
Simone de Beauvoir (1908–1986) was a French writer, intellectual, existentialist philosopher, political activist, feminist and social theorist.

- Simone de Beauvoir (1908–1986) was a French writer, intellectual, existentialist philosopher, political activist, feminist and social theorist. Though she did not consider herself a philosopher, she had a significant influence on both feminist existentialism and feminist theory. De Beauvoir wrote novels, essays, biographies, autobiography and monographs on philosophy, politics and social issues. She is known for her 1949 treatise The Second Sex, a detailed analysis of women's oppression and a foundational tract of contemporary feminism.
- Patricia Churchland (born 1943) is a Canadian-American philosopher noted for her contributions to neurophilosophy and the philosophy of mind. She is UC President's professor of philosophy emerita at the University of California, San Diego (UCSD), where she has taught since 1984. Educated at the University of British Columbia, the University of Pittsburgh, and the University of Oxford, she taught philosophy at the University of Manitoba from 1969 to 1984.
- Dorothy Emmet (1904–2000) was a Commonwealth Fellowship at Radcliffe College, where she was a pupil of A.N. Whitehead. From 1932 to 1938 she was a lecturer in philosophy at King's College, Newcastle-upon-Tyne (now the University of Newcastle), having beaten A.J. Ayer as a finalist for the job. She joked that the profession owed her one, since Ayer went on to a distinguished career at University College London. Emmet went from Newcastle to the University of Manchester, first as a lecturer in the Philosophy of Religion and then as Sir Samuel Hall Professor of Philosophy. She was head of Manchester University's philosophy department for over twenty years. With Margaret Masterman and Richard Braithwaite she was a founder member of the Epiphany Philosophers, and Editor of Theoria to Theory. Emmet was also President of the Aristotelian Society 1953–1954. Between 1966 and 1976 she paid a number of visits to Africa as an examiner and consultant on courses in philosophy in the universities of Ifa and Ibadan, Nigeria. Emmet was a Fellow of Lucy Cavendish College, Cambridge, which has specialized in students from non-traditional backgrounds. Her books include Whitehead's Philosophy of Organism (1932) and The Nature of Metaphysical Thinking (1945).
- Philippa Foot (1920–2010) was a British philosopher, most notable for her works in ethics. She was one of the founders of contemporary virtue ethics, inspired by the ethics of Aristotle. Her later career marked a significant change in view from her work in the 1950s and '60s, and may be seen as an attempt to modernize Aristotelian ethical theory, to show that it is adaptable to a contemporary world view, and thus, that it could compete with such popular theories as modern deontological and utilitarian ethics. Some of her work was crucial in the re-emergence of normative ethics within analytic philosophy, especially her critique of consequentialism and of non-cognitivism. A familiar example is the continuing discussion of an example of hers referred to as the trolley problem. Foot's approach was influenced by the later work of Wittgenstein, although she rarely dealt explicitly with materials treated by him.
- Susan Haack (1945-2026) was a distinguished professor in the humanities, professor of philosophy, and professor of law at the University of Miami. She earned her PhD at Cambridge University. She had written on logic, the philosophy of language, epistemology, and metaphysics. Her pragmatism followed that of Charles Sanders Peirce. Haack's major contribution to philosophy was her epistemological theory called foundherentism, which was her attempt to avoid the logical problems of both pure foundationalism (which is susceptible to infinite regress) and pure coherentism (which is susceptible to circularity). Haack was a fierce critic of Richard Rorty. She was also critical of the view that there is a specifically female perspective on logic and scientific truth and was critical of feminist epistemology. She held that many feminist critiques of science and philosophy were overly concerned with 'political correctness'.
- Mary Midgley (1919–2018) was an English moral philosopher. Midgley was a senior lecturer in philosophy at Newcastle University, and is known today for her work on science, ethics and animal rights. Midgley strongly opposed reductionism and scientism, and any attempts to make science a substitute for the humanities—a role for which it is, she argued, wholly inadequate. She wrote extensively about what philosophers can learn from nature, particularly from animals. The Guardian described her as a fiercely combative philosopher and the UK's "foremost scourge of 'scientific pretension.'"
- Mary Warnock (1924–2019) was a British philosopher who worked in ethics, philosophy of education, and philosophy of mind. She also wrote on existentialism. From 1984 to 1991, Warnock was Mistress of Girton College, Cambridge. Warnock studied at Lady Margaret Hall, Oxford, and was made an Honorary Fellow in 1984. She delivered the Gifford Lectures, entitled "Imagination and Understanding," at the University of Glasgow in 1992. She has written extensively on ethics, existentialism, and philosophy of mind.
- Ayn Rand (1905–1982) developed a philosophical system she named Objectivism, which affirms objective reality and advocates holding reason as absolute. In ethics, Rand championed rational egoism and individualism. In politics, she advocated for individual rights and capitalism. In esthetics, she upheld romanticism. Rand regards Aristotle as her sole major philosophical influence.
- Giannina Braschi (born 1954) is a Latina philosopher from Puerto Rico who writes on decolonialization, "feardom", enculturation and immigration, and the contradictions of Puerto Rican citizenship.
- Susan Hurley (1954-2007): wrote on practical philosophy as well as on philosophy of mind, bringing these disciplines closer together. Her work drew on sources from the social sciences as well as the neurosciences, and is broadly characterised as both naturalistic and interdisciplinary.
- Linda Martín Alcoff (born 1955) is a Latina philosopher from Panama who coedited Stories of Women in Philosophy. Her subjects spans decolonial practices and the salience of racial identify.

Other notable philosophers include:

- Grete Hermann (1901–1984)
- Alice Ambrose (1906–2001)
- Sofia Vanni-Rovighi (1908–1990)
- Simone Weil (1909–1943)
- Raya Dunayevskaya (1910–1987)
- Jeanne Hersch (1910–2000)
- Iris Murdoch (1919–1999)
- Ruth Barcan Marcus (1921–2012)
- Mary Hesse (1924–2016)
- Judith Jarvis Thomson (1929–2020)
- Cora Diamond (born 1937)
- Marilyn Frye (born 1941)
- Julia Kristeva (born 1941)
- Genevieve Lloyd (born 1941)
- Onora O'Neill (born 1941)
- Nancy Cartwright (philosopher) (born 1944)
- Nancy Fraser (born 1947)
- Martha Nussbaum (born 1947)
- Barbara Cassin (born 1947)
- Rebecca Goldstein (born 1950)
- Christine Korsgaard (born 1952)
- Avital Ronell (born 1952)
- Susan Hurley (born 1954)
- Judith Butler (born 1956)
- Ruth Hagengruber (born 1958)
- Nancy Bauer (philosopher) (born 1960)
- Tamar Gendler (born 1965)
- Ilaria Brocchini (born 1966)
- Alice Crary (born 1967)
- Rahel Jaeggi (born 1967)

== Contemporary representation and working climate ==
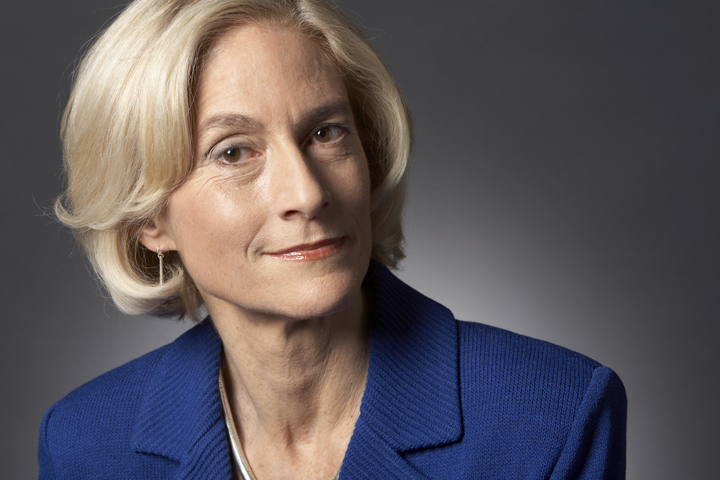
American philosopher Martha Nussbaum, who completed a PhD in philosophy at Harvard University in 1975, alleges that she encountered a tremendous amount of discrimination at Harvard, including sexual harassment and problems getting childcare.

In the early 1990s, the Canadian Philosophical Association claimed that "...there is compelling evidence" of "...philosophy's gender imbalance" and "bias and partiality in many of its theoretical products." In 1992, the association recommended that "fifty percent of [philosophy]...positions should be filled by women." In a 2008 article "Changing the Ideology and Culture of Philosophy: Not by Reason (Alone)," MIT philosophy professor Sally Haslanger stated that the top twenty graduate programs in philosophy in the US have from 4 percent to 36 percent women faculty. In June 2013, Duke University professor of sociology Kieran Healy stated that "out of all recent citations in four prestigious philosophy journals, female authors comprise just 3.6 percent of the total." The editors of the Stanford Encyclopedia of Philosophy have raised concerns about the underrepresentation of women philosophers; as such, the encyclopedia "encourage[s] [their] authors, subject editors, and referees to help ensure that SEP entries do not overlook the work of women or indeed of members of underrepresented groups more generally."

American philosopher Sally Haslanger stated in 2008 that "...it is very hard to find a place in philosophy that isn't actively hostile towards women and minorities, or at least assumes that a successful philosopher should look and act like a (traditional, white) man." Haslanger states that she experienced "occasions when a woman's status in graduate school was questioned because she was married, or had a child (or had taken time off to have a child so was returning to philosophy as a 'mature' student), or was in a long-distance relationship". American philosopher Martha Nussbaum, who completed a PhD in philosophy at Harvard University in 1975, alleges that she encountered a tremendous amount of discrimination during her studies at Harvard, including sexual harassment and problems getting childcare for her daughter.

In July 2015, British philosopher Mary Warnock addressed the issue of the representation of women in British university philosophy departments, where 25% of faculty are women. Warnock stated she is "... against intervention, by quotas or otherwise, to increase women's chances of employment" in philosophy. She also argues that "... there is nothing intrinsically harmful about this imbalance" and she states that she does not "...believe it shows a conscious bias against women." Philosopher Julian Baggini states that he believes that there is "...little or no conscious discrimination against women in philosophy". At the same time, Baggini states that there may be a "...great deal of unconscious bias" against women in philosophy, because philosophy generally does not address issues of gender or ethnicity.

=== Allegations of sexual harassment ===
In 2014, Inside Higher Education described the philosophy "...discipline's own long history of misogyny and sexual harassment." On March 28, 2011, the blog New APPS published a post examining the allegations of persistent sexual harassment faced by women professors in philosophy, due largely to "serial harassers" continuing to work in the field despite widespread knowledge of their actions. The post proposed that, since institutional procedures seemed to have been ineffective at removing or punishing harassers, philosophers should socially shun known offenders. The story was subsequently featured at Inside Higher Ed and several blogs, including Gawker and Jezebel. In 2013, a series of posts on the blog "What's it like to be a woman in philosophy?" instigated a spate of mainstream media articles on the continued dominance of men in philosophy. Eric Schliesser, a professor of philosophy at Ghent University, said he believes that the "...systematic pattern of exclusion of women in philosophy is, in part, due to the fact that my profession has allowed a culture of harassment, sexual predating, and bullying to be reproduced from one generation to the next." According to Heidi Lockwood, an associate professor of philosophy at Southern Connecticut State University, there is a "...power "asymmetry" between professors and students – even graduate students"; as well, she noted that "...even when colleges and universities have blanket prohibitions against professor-student sexual relationships, as does Yale,...institution-specific policies leave students vulnerable [to sexual advances from faculty] at conferences."

According to an August 2013 article in Salon, a tenured male University of Miami philosopher resigned after allegedly "...sending emails to a [female] student in which he suggested that they have sex three times." Jennifer Saul, a professor of philosophy at the University of Sheffield, set up a blog for women philosophers in 2010. She received numerous allegations of sexual harassment by male philosophy faculty, including a "job candidate who said she was sexually assaulted at the annual APA meeting where job interviews take place", an "undergraduate whose professor joked publicly about dripping hot wax on her nipples" and a "... lesbian who found herself suddenly invited, after she came out, to join in the sexualizing of her female colleagues." Saul states that philosophy departments failed to deal with the allegations. In 2013, the American Philosophical Association formed a committee to study the allegations of sexual harassment of women students and professors by male philosophy faculty. Saul states that one of the allegations was regarding a "...distinguished visiting speaker whose first words are: "Show me a grad student I can fuck"." Saul states that women are "...leaving philosophy after being harassed, assaulted, or retaliated against." In 2014, Inside Higher Education reported allegations that a Yale University philosophy professor had sexually harassed a woman; the "alleged victim says she reported the professor to Yale, with no real result". In an interview with Inside Higher Ed, the alleged victim stated that she "...suffers from post-traumatic stress disorder that impedes everyday life, not only from the alleged attack but also from the "browbeating" she endured as she attempted to report the professor, again and again, to Yale officials."

In 1993, the American Philosophical Association's sexual harassment committee set out guidelines for addressing this issue in philosophy departments. The APA guidelines, which were revised in 2013, stated that:

- "Sexual advances, requests for sexual favors, or sexually directed remarks constitute sexual harassment when submission to such conduct is made a condition of academic or employment decisions, or when such conduct persists despite its rejection."
- "Sexual harassment is a serious violation of professional ethics, and should be regarded and treated as such by members of the profession. Sexual harassment is a form of prohibited discrimination when an institution or individual employee is aware of a sexually hostile environment and condones, tolerates or allows that environment to exist. Colleges and universities should supply clear, fair institutional procedures under which charges of sexual harassment on campus can be brought, assessed, and acted on."
- "Complaints of sexual harassment at APA-sponsored activities should be brought to the chair of the committee for the defense of professional rights of philosophers or, if they arise in the context of placement activities, to the APA ombudsperson. Complaints of sexual harassment by or against APA staff members should be brought to the chair of the board."

=== Black women ===
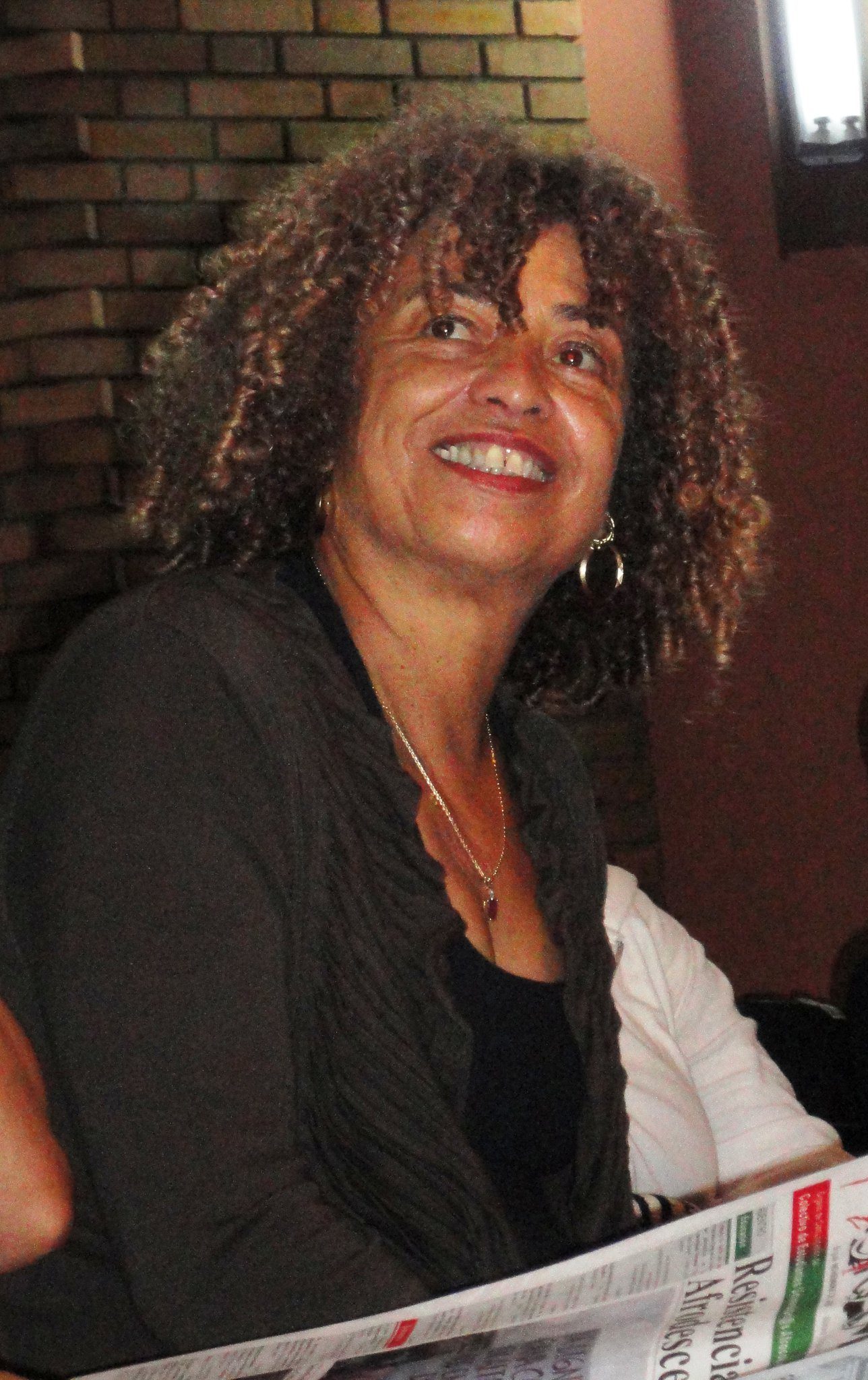
Angela Davis (born 1944) is an American political activist, philosopher and author. Her research interests include African-American studies and the philosophy of punishment and prisons.

Nana Asmaʼu (1793–1864), from the Sokoto Caliphate in today's Nigeria, is one of many notable black women philosophers. She was a founder of the educational network Yan Taru ('The Associates'), which is still active today. She wrote in the Fulfulde, Hausa and Arabic languages, and her first text had the title: 'Warning for the Negligent and Reminder for the Intelligent Regarding the Ways of the Pious'. She argued for humility between people, and for "good relations with one's relatives, servants, and comrades. This is shown by being cheerful with them; doing good things for them; serving them; never acting as if superior to them; consulting them in many matters; helping them financially and physically [...]"

Phillis Wheatley and Ida B. Wells are other notable women thinkers of African and African-American background in the 19th century.

There are few black women philosophers, which includes women of African and Caribbean ancestry, African-Americans and other individuals from the African diaspora. According to philosopher Sally Haslanger, the "numbers of philosophers of color, especially women of color, is even more appalling"; in a 2003 study, there "...was insufficient data for any racial group of women other than white women to report." In the United States, the "...representation of scholars of color is plausibly worse than in any other field in the academy, including not only physics, but also engineering." According to professor L.K. McPherson, there is a "gross underrepresentation of blacks in philosophy." McPherson states that there is a "...willful, not necessarily a conscious, preference among many members of the philosophy profession largely to maintain the status quo in terms of: the social group profiles of members; the dynamics of prestige and influence; and the areas and questions deemed properly or deeply 'philosophical.' None of this is good for black folk."

The first black woman in the US to do a PhD in philosophy was Joyce Mitchell Cook, who obtained her degree in 1965 from Yale University. LaVerne Shelton was also one of the earliest black women to receive a PhD in philosophy. Other notable women include Angela Davis, a political activist who specializes in writing about feminism, critical theory, Marxism, popular music, social consciousness, and the philosophy of punishment and prisons; Kathryn Gines, the founding director of the Collegium of Black Woman Philosophers, who specializes in continental philosophy, Africana philosophy, philosophy of race and Black feminist philosophy; Anita L. Allen, the first African-American woman to complete both a JD and a PhD in philosophy, who focuses on political and legal philosophy, and who in 2010 was appointed by President Obama to sit on the Presidential Commission for the Study of Bioethical Issues; and Adrian Piper, an analytical philosopher who received a PhD in philosophy from Harvard; Jaqueline Scott, who received a PhD in philosophy from Stanford University, and who specializes in Nietzsche, nineteenth-century philosophy, race theory and African-American philosophy. In 2018, Mpho Tshivhase became the first black woman in South Africa to complete a PhD in philosophy.

=== Asian women ===
Few Asian women are recognized in contemporary Western philosophy. In a New York Times interview with George Yancy, Korean-American philosopher Emily S. Lee, assistant professor of philosophy at California State University, Fullerton, states, "I wonder if some of my experiences occur from being Asian-American, in the ways people stereotypically assume that I must specialize in certain areas of philosophy or behave in specific ways, such as being quiet and subdued." She postulates that the social forces that stereotype and encourage Asian-Americans to enter more lucrative and secure fields (such as engineering or medicine) combined with influences within the field of philosophy discouraging Asian-American youths from continuing their study in the field has led to the extremely small population of Asian-American female philosophers. University of Washington philosophy professor Carole Lee's report in the American Philosophical Association's newsletter on Asian and Asian-American Philosophers and Philosophies suggests that Asian women face conflicting stereotypes, making it difficult for them to fit into the field of philosophy: "Women are stereotyped as submissive rather than aggressive and as being bad at math: they lack both characteristics associated with philosophy." On the other had, "Asian Americans are stereotyped as being mathematical; however, they are characterized in passive rather than aggressive terms." Philosopher David Kim offers the explanation that a lack of Asian American mentors in philosophy and "derogation of philosophical thought that resonates with their identity" may also contribute to the wide disparity.

=== Latinas in philosophy ===
The burgeoning field of Latino philosophy acknowledges the role of Chicana Feminism and the cultural theories by Gloria E. Anzaldúa (1947–2004) as precursors to the field. Latina philosophers who practice in the United States and publish widely in Spanish and English include: Maria Lugones (born 1948), and Susana Nuccetelli (1954) from Argentina; and Ofelia Schutte (1944) from Cuba; Linda Martín Alcoff (1955) from Panama (editor of "Stories of Women in Philosophy"); and Giannina Braschi (1953) from Puerto Rico. Giannina Braschi's writings on Puerto Rican independence and capitalism focus on financial terrorism, gender identity, debt structures, and "feardom". Whereas, Susana Nuccetelli widely questions the nature of justice, women's rights, and Latina cultural identity. Forerunners to other women in the field of Latino philosophy are Spanish and Latin American women philosophers who wrote in Spanish: Teresa de Avila (1515–1582), Oliva Sabuco (1562–1622), Sor Juana Inez de la Cruz (1648–1695), Maria Zambrano (1904–1991), and Victoria Camps (1941). One of the earliest Latin American feminist philosophers was Graciela Hierro (1928–2003), who introduced feminist philosophy into the academic curriculum of Mexican universities in the 1970s and organized the first panel on feminism at a national Mexican philosophy conference in 1979. Academic platforms for their work include Letras Femininas, Chasqui, Latinx Cultural Center at Utah State University, APA Newsletter on Hispanic/Latino Issues on Philosophy, Society for Mexican-American Philosophy, and the annual Latinx Philosophy Conference. These forums span a wide range of Latino social justice and cultural issues (e.g. Imperialism, coloniality of gender, race theories, gender discrimination, gender in grammar, immigration, incarceration, decolonialization, citizenship, queer desire, and disability within Latin American and U.S. Latina feminisms).

=== Reasons for under-representation ===
Many possible causes explain why women are underrepresented in philosophy. As mentioned above, female philosophers have faced discrimination and sexual harassment in the workplace. Other hypotheses have risen as the problem of under-representation becomes more apparent. A. E. Kings points to a particular "myth of genius" that could be affecting the rate at which women pursue post-graduate degrees in philosophy. This myth is about perception; Kings believes that women are less likely to be perceived as "geniuses." These perceptions can be internalized, which "can lead to under performance, and even withdrawal from a discipline altogether." Under representation can be seen as a cyclical issue. Because there are few women in the academic field, women face challenges upon entering a male-dominated area, which could in turn discourage them from continuing higher education in philosophy. Sally Haslanger (mentioned above) recalled "in my year at Berkeley and in the two years ahead of me and two years behind me, there was only one woman each year in classes of eight to ten students. Eventually, the other four women dropped out, so I was the only woman left in five consecutive classes."

==== Role overload ====
Role overload is a concept that can apply to women in a multitude of ways. Role overload is the idea that there are multiple roles a person must take on, and in maintaining these roles, psychological duress can occur. These roles could be within a workplace, higher education, or at home. Examples of these roles outside of the academic and workplace environment include the role of mother or caregiver. Role overload could also occur if a person is required to fulfill many roles at once within the workplace. In higher education, role overload could be seen as a person performing the roles of a student and teaching assistant at the same time. It could also compound; a woman could be a mother, working a job, as well as being a student.

== Reports from the US ==
U.S. Department of Education reports indicate that philosophy is one of the least proportionate fields in the humanities with respect to gender. Although reports indicate that philosophy as a professional field is disproportionately male, no clear, unequivocal data exists on the number of women currently in philosophy, or indeed, on the number of men in philosophy, and it is debatable how to define what it means to be 'in philosophy.' This can variously be defined as the current number of Ph.D. holders in philosophy, the current number of women teaching philosophy in two- and four- year institutions of higher learning either/both full-time and/or part-time (no one data set exists which measures these), or the current number of living women with publications in philosophy. The lack of clear data makes it difficult to establish gender proportions, but the consensus among those who have tried to arrive at an estimate is that women make up between 17% and 30% of academically employed philosophers. Current studies show that women make up 23.68% of professors in philosophy; this applies both to tenured professors, and associate and assistant professors. Another study found that the rate of women in philosophy has not increased significantly. Between 1994 and 2013, female PhDs in philosophy decreased by 0.5%.

The National Center for Education Statistics' 2000 report, "Salary, Promotion, and Tenure Status of Minority and Women Faculty in U.S. Colleges and Universities," estimates in Table 23 that the total number of "History and Philosophy" U.S. citizens and full-time faculty who primarily taught in 1992 was 19,000, of which 79% were men (i.e. 15,010 men in history and philosophy), 21% were women (3,990). They add, "In fact, men were at least twice as likely as women to teach history and philosophy."

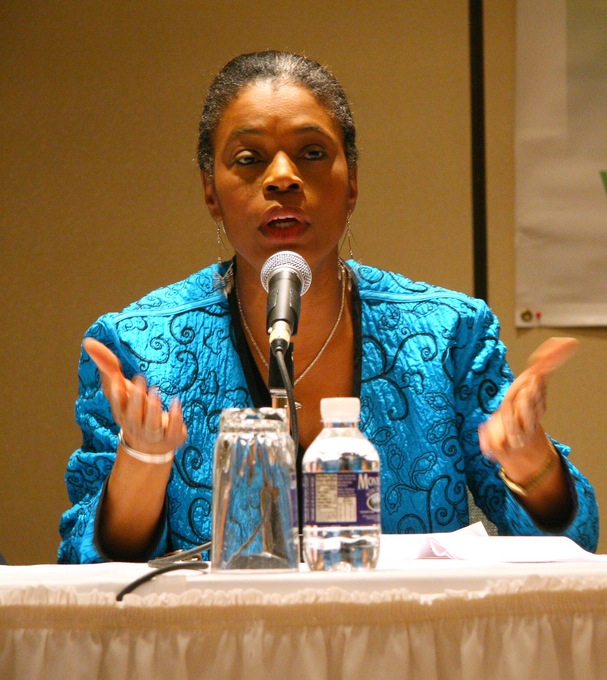
Anita L. Allen (born 1953) is a professor of law and professor of philosophy at the University of Pennsylvania Law School.

In their 1997 report, "Characteristics and Attitudes of Instructional Faculty and Staff in the Humanities," NCES notes, that about "one-half of full-time instructional faculty and staff in 4-year institutions in English and literature (47 percent) and foreign languages (50 percent) were female in the fall of 1992, compared with less than one-half of instructional faculty and staff in history (24 percent) and philosophy and religion (13 percent) (table 4)." In this report they measure Philosophy and Religion in the same data set, and estimate the total number of full-time instructional Philosophy and Religion faculty and staff in 4-yr institutions to be 7,646. Of these, 87.3% are male (6675 men), 12.7 are female (971 women). The 1997 report measures History Full-time instructional faculty and staff in 4-yr institutions to be 11,383; male:76.3 (8,686 men); female: 23.7 (2,697 women). The numbers of women in philosophy from the two studies are not easily comparable, but one rough method may be to subtract the number of women in history in the 1997 report from the number of women estimated to be in 'history and philosophy' in the 2000 report. Doing so suggests that as a rough estimate, 1,293 women are employed as instructors of philosophy.

The 1997 report indicates that a large portion of all humanities instructors are part-time. Part-time employees are disproportionately female but not majority female. Therefore, considerations of full-time employees only necessarily leave out data on many women working part-time to remain active in their field. In 2004, the percentage of Ph.D.s in philosophy, within the U.S., going to women reached a record high percentage: 33.3%, or 121 of the 363 doctorates awarded.

== Organizations and campaigns ==
=== Minorities and Philosophy (MAP) ===
Minorities and Philosophy (MAP) is an international movement of graduate and undergraduate students and faculty members in philosophy working on issues related to "the under representation of women and minorities in philosophy." MAP consists of chapters at universities around the world, and the format can vary from school to school. However, all chapters focus broadly on issues minorities face in the profession, philosophical issues regarding minorities, and work done by minority philosophers, as well as issues that are specific to that school's philosophy department. MAP's short-term goals include providing a space for students to discuss and work on these issues, and long-term goals include contributing to the culture of academic philosophy and increasing participation and recognition of minorities in philosophy. In recent years, MAP has fostered collaborative work between chapters, establishing "connections between chapters that benefit both members and departments long-term," increased work on inclusive pedagogy, and organized efforts to bring philosophy into communities outside of university campuses, such as prisons and elementary schools.

=== Committee on the Status of Women (American Philosophical Association) ===
The Committee on the Status of Women is a committee of the American Philosophical Association devoted to the assessment and reporting on the status of women in philosophy. It is currently chaired by Hilde Lindemann. In April 2007, the Committee on the Status of Women co-sponsored a session on the central question "Why Are Women Only 21% of Philosophy". At this session, Sharon Crasnow suggested that the low numbers of women in philosophy may be due to:

- Differential treatment: male and female university students may be treated differently in the classroom.
- Vicious circle: female students do not feel inclined to study philosophy because of a lack of contact with female philosophy professors.
- Misleading statistics: university administrators focus on gender representation in the humanities overall, which obscures the disparity in philosophy.

=== Society for Women in Philosophy ===
The Society for Women in Philosophy is a group created in 1972 that seeks to support and promote women in philosophy. It has a number of branches around the world, including in New York, the American Pacific, the United Kingdom and Canada. Each year, the society names one philosopher the distinguished woman philosopher of the year.

Honorees include:

- 2024: Lori Gruen (Wesleyan University)
- 2023: Ann Ferguson (University of Massachusetts, Amherst)
- 2022: Kathryn Norlock (Trent University)
- 2021: Margaret 'Peg' Simmons (Southern Illinois University, Edwardsville)
- 2020: Ann Garry (California State Los Angeles)
- 2016: Maria Lugones (Binghamton University)
- 2014: Peggy DesAutels
- 2013: Alison Wylie (University of Washington, Seattle)
- 2012: Diana Tietjens Meyers
- 2011: Jennifer Saul
- 2010: Sally Haslanger (MIT)
- 2009: Lorraine Code
- 2008: Nancy Tuana
- 2007: Joan Callahan
- 2006: Ruth Millikan
- 2005: Linda Martín Alcoff
- 2004: Susan Sherwin
- 2003: Eva Feder Kittay
- 2002: Sara Ruddick
- 2001: Amelie Rorty

=== Gendered Conference Campaign ===
Co-founded by Jennifer Saul, the blog Feminist Philosophers used to host the Gendered Conference Campaign. The campaign worked toward increasing the representation of women at philosophy conferences and in edited volumes. One of the key statements of the blog was that that "all-male events and volumes help to perpetuate the stereotyping of philosophy as male. This in turn contributes to implicit bias against women in philosophy." The blog closed in 2019.

== See also ==
- List of female philosophers
