= Alison Jaggar =

American feminist philosopher (born 1942)

Alison M. Jaggar
- Born: Alison Mary Hayes; September 23, 1942 (age 84); Sheffield, England, United Kingdom

Philosophical work
- Era: Contemporary philosophy
- Region: Western philosophy
- School: Feminist philosophy, Feminist studies
- Institutions: University of Colorado, Boulder, University of Oslo, SUNY Buffalo, Miami University, the University of Cincinnati, the University of Illinois at Chicago, the University of California, Los Angeles, Rutgers University, Victoria University of Wellington
- Main interests: Social philosophy, moral philosophy, political philosophy

Alison Mary Jaggar (born September 23, 1942) is an American feminist philosopher born in England. She is College Professor of Distinction in the Philosophy and Women and Gender Studies departments at the University of Colorado, Boulder and Distinguished Research Professor at the University of Birmingham in the United Kingdom. She was one of the first people to introduce feminist concerns in to philosophy.

== Education and career ==
Born in Sheffield, England, Jaggar earned a bachelor's degree in philosophy at Bedford College, University of London in 1964 and a master's degree in philosophy from the University of Edinburgh in 1967. She completed her doctorate in philosophy from the State University of New York (SUNY), Buffalo in 1970.

During her career, Jaggar has held appointments at SUNY Buffalo, Miami University, the University of Cincinnati, the University of Illinois at Chicago, the University of California, Los Angeles, Rutgers University, Victoria University of Wellington, the University of Oslo, and the University of Birmingham. From 1994 to 1997, she was director of the Women's Studies department at the University of Colorado at Boulder. She later served as Graduate Director and Associate Chair of the Philosophy department at the university from 2004 to 2008. From 2007 to 2014, she worked as a Research Coordinator at the Centre for the Study of Mind in Nature at the University of Oslo in Norway.

A founding member of the Society for Women in Philosophy, she was instrumental in the creation of the field of feminist studies, and taught what she believes to have been the first feminist philosophy course ever offered. A co-founder of Hypatia: A Journal of Feminist Philosophy, Jaggar was a member of the editorial board from 1983 to 2009 and Associate Editor from 2006 to 2008. She chaired the American Philosophical Association (APA) Committee on the Status of Women from 1986 to 1991 and served as co-president of the North American Society for Social Philosophy from 1995 to 1997.

Jaggar has been awarded research fellowships from the National Endowment for the Humanities, the Rockefeller Foundation, American Association of University Women (AAUW), the University of Edinburgh, the Norwegian Research Council and the Australian Research Council. She has served on the editorial boards of Against the Current, Hypatia: A Journal of Feminist Philosophy, Radical Philosophy Review, Asian Journal of Women's Studies, Journal of Social Philosophy, Studies in Feminist Philosophy, International Journal of Feminist Bioethics, and Journal of International Critical Thought.

Jaggar was elected a Fellow of the American Academy of Arts and Sciences in 2017.

== Philosophical work ==
Jaggar studies gender and globalization using normative, methodological, and epistemological perspectives. She has published several articles identifying "how global institutions and policies interact with local practices to create gendered cycles of vulnerability and exploitation" and its influence on policy. She has helped develop a new poverty measure that evaluates how gender influences and is impacted by poverty.

Her work has been hugely influential, with Rosemarie Tong and Nancy Williams suggesting in the Stanford Encyclopedia of Philosophy that "If ethics is about human beings' liberation, then Alison Jaggar's summary of the fourfold function of feminist ethics cannot be improved upon in any significant way" and Jaggar's texts being considered classics.

== Selected publications ==
Jaggar has authored a large number of widely cited papers, most notably "Love and knowledge: Emotion in feminist epistemology", published in 1989. Jaggar has also acted as co-editor for the first issue of Telos, and was a co-founder and associate editor of Hypatia: A Journal of Feminist Philosophy from 2006 to 2008.

Jaggar has written one book, edited seven books, and co-authored two:

- Jaggar, Alison; Rothenberg, Paula (1978). Feminist frameworks: alternative theoretical accounts of the relations between women and men. New York: McGraw-Hill. ISBN 9780070322509.
- Jaggar, Alison (1983). Feminist politics and human nature. Totowa, New Jersey: Rowman & Allanheld. ISBN 9780710806536.
- Jaggar, Alison; Bordo, Susan R. (1989). Gender/body/knowledge: feminist reconstructions of being and knowing. New Brunswick, New Jersey: Rutgers University Press. ISBN 9780813513799.
- Jaggar, Alison (1994). Living with contradictions: controversies in feminist social ethics. Boulder, Colorado: Westview Press. ISBN 9780813317762.
- Jaggar, Alison; Sterba, James P.; Gould, Carol C.; Solomon, Robert C.; Machan, Tibor R.; Galstone, William A.; Fisk, Milton (1995). Morality and social justice: point/counterpoint. Lanham, Maryland: Rowman & Littlefield Publishers. ISBN 9780847679782.
- Jaggar, Alison; Young, Iris Marion (2000). A companion to feminist philosophy. Malden, Massachusetts: Blackwell. ISBN 9780631227649.
- Jaggar, Alison (2005), "Arenas of citizenship: civil society, the state and the global order", in Friedman, Marilyn (ed.), Women and citizenship, Studies in Feminist Philosophy, Oxford New York: Oxford University Press, pp. 91–110, ISBN 9780195175356.
- Jaggar, Alison (2008). Just methods: an interdisciplinary feminist reader. Boulder, Colorado: Paradigm Publishers. ISBN 9781594512032.
- Jaggar, Alison; Tooley, Michael; Wolfe-Devine, Celia; Devine, Philip E. (2009). Abortion: three perspectives. New York: Oxford University Press. ISBN 9780195380279.
- Jaggar, Alison (2010). Thomas Pogge and his critics. Cambridge Malden, Massachusetts: Polity. ISBN 9780745642581.
- Jaggar, Alison (2014). Gender and global justice. Cambridge, UK Malden, Massachusetts: Polity. ISBN 9780745663760.
- Jaggar, Alison M. (July 2015). "On Susan Moller Okin's "Reason and feeling in thinking about justice"" (PDF). Ethics. 125 (4): 1127–1131. doi:10.1086/680878. JSTOR 10.1086/680878. S2CID 170851415. Archived from the original (PDF) on 2019-09-04.
