= Society for Women in Philosophy =

Organization to support and promote women in philosophy

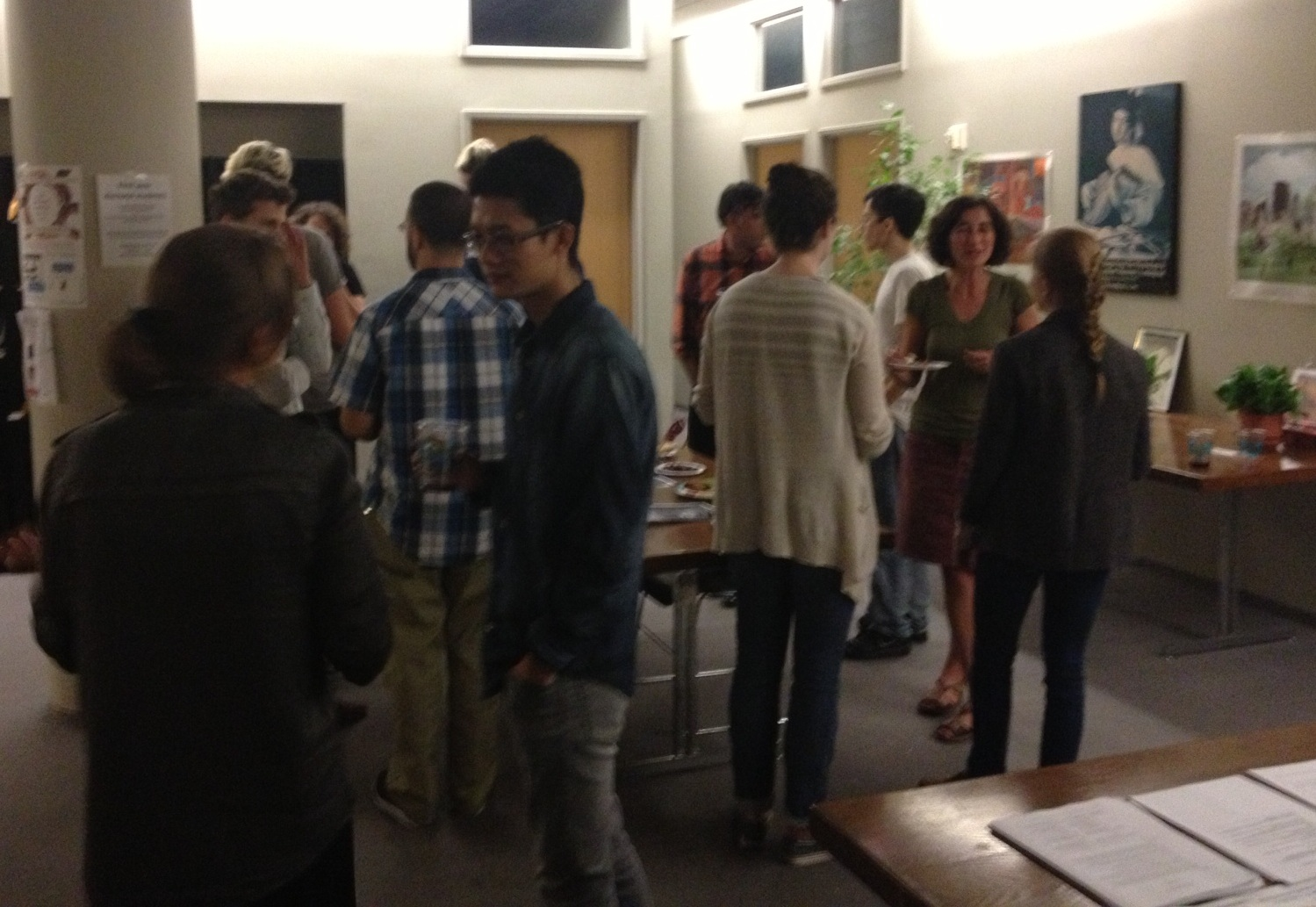
Reception after Professor Sharon Street’s SWIP-Analytic presentation “Normativity and Water, The Analogy and Its Limits” at the CUNY Graduate Center, October 7, 2013.

The Society for Women in Philosophy was created in 1972 to support and promote women in philosophy. Since that time the Society for Women in Philosophy or "SWIP" has expanded to many branches around the world, including in the US, Canada, Ireland, the UK, the Netherlands, Flanders, and Germany. SWIP organizations worldwide hold meetings and lectures that aim to support women in philosophy; some, such as SWIPshop, focus exclusively on feminist philosophy, while others, such as SWIP-Analytic, focus on women philosophers working in other areas. One of the founding members of the Society for Women in Philosophy was Alison Jaggar, who was also one of the first people to introduce feminist concerns into philosophy. Each year, one philosopher is named the Distinguished Woman Philosopher of the Year by the Society for Women in Philosophy.

== Archive ==
Some SWIP archive records were originally housed in the Sophia Smith Collection at the Smith College library (started in 1982 by Kathy Pyne Parsons Addelson following the 10th anniversary of SWIP). The official SWIP Archive will now be permanently housed in the Feminist Theory Archive, Pembroke Center, Brown University. The new SWIP home is the product of the efforts of the Feminist Philosophy Archive Project created in June 2013 and ending in July 2014. The main goal of the FPA Project team, composed of philosophers Joan Callahan, Ann Garry, Alison Jaggar, Sandra Harding, Christina Rawls, and Samantha Noll, was to locate and organize the best possible professional archive for over four decades of SWIP records to be preserved. As of December 2014, the American Philosophical Association awarded the Feminist Theory Archive, SWIP, and the FPAP organizing team financial assistance to aid in the processing and preservation of SWIP materials donated.

== Branches ==
- NYSWIP is a branch of SWIP based in New York. It was founded in 1993. It aims to feature the scholarly work of women philosophers. To this end, it holds the Sue Weinberg Lecture Series, SWIPshop, and SWIP-Analytic.
- P-SWIP is a branch of SWIP based in the American Pacific.
- CSWIP is a branch of SWIP based in Canada. CSWIP supports women in philosophy, fosters feminism in philosophy and philosophy in feminism.
- SWIP Ireland is a branch of SWIP based in Ireland. SWIP Ireland aims to "promote philosophy by women, raise awareness of problems faced by women in the discipline, facilitate co-operation between women in philosophy in the Island of Ireland, create links with women philosophers in other countries, promote research by and on women philosophers, organise conferences and meetings on topic of interest to women philosophers".
- SWIP UK is a branch of SWIP based in the United Kingdom. SWIP UK is an organisation of UK students and professionals in philosophy.
- SWIP.NL is the Dutch branch of SWIP and supports women in philosophy in the Netherlands and Flanders.
- SWIP Germany is the German-language branch of SWIP and seeks to "advance the equal treatment of women and gender parity in philosophy".
- SWIP CH is the Swiss branch of SWIP and supports women in philosophy in Switzerland. SWIP CH is "a non-profit society with the aim to combat gender inequality in the field of philosophy".

== Distinguished Woman Philosopher of the Year winners ==
Each year, one philosopher is named the Distinguished Woman Philosopher for the year by the Eastern Division of the Society for Women in Philosophy. In response to her 2011 Distinguished Woman Philosopher Award Jennifer Saul said, "I'm deeply honored and absolutely stunned by this. It’s especially wonderful to be recognized as making a difference in people's lives by doing philosophy. For me, that's the highest honor there could be."

- 2016: Maria Lugones (Binghamton University)
- 2014: Peggy DesAutels (University of Dayton)
- 2013: Alison Wylie (University of Washington, Seattle)
- 2012: Diana Meyers (Loyola University Chicago)
- 2011: Jennifer Saul (University of Sheffield)
- 2010: Sally Haslanger (MIT)
- 2009: Lorraine Code (York University)
- 2008: Nancy Tuana (Pennsylvania State University)
- 2007: Joan Callahan (University of Kentucky)
- 2006: Ruth Millikan (University of Connecticut)
- 2005: Linda Martín Alcoff (Hunter College, CUNY)
- 2004: Susan Sherwin (Dalhousie University)
- 2003: Eva Feder Kittay (Stony Brook University)
- 2002: Sara Ruddick (New School of Social Research)
- 2001: Amélie Rorty (Brandeis University)
- 2000: No recipient
- 1999: Marilyn Frye (Michigan State University)
- 1998: Linda López McAlister (University of South Florida)
- 1997: Claudia Card (University of Wisconsin)
- 1996: Gertrude Ezorsky (Brooklyn College, CUNY)
- 1995: Alison Jaggar (University of Colorado)
- 1994: Iris Marion Young (University of Chicago)
- 1993: Kathryn Pyne Addelson (Smith College)
- 1992: Virginia Held (CUNY Graduate Center)
- 1991: Jane Roland Martin (University of Massachusetts, Boston)
- 1990: Sandra Harding (UCLA)
- 1989: Hazel Barnes (University of Colorado)
- 1988: Leigh Cauman (Columbia University)
- 1987: Elizabeth Flower (University of Pennsylvania)
- 1986: Mary Mothersill (Barnard College)
- 1985: Marjorie Grene (as of 1988 (Virginia Tech))
- 1984: Elizabeth Lane Beardsley (Temple University)

== Hypatia ==
Hypatia: A Journal of Feminist Philosophy, published quarterly by Wiley-Blackwell has its roots in the Society for Women in Philosophy.

== Events ==
In the 1980s, while a graduate student at the City University of New York Graduate Center, Mary Ellen Waithe, now professor of philosophy and interim director of Women's Studies at Cleveland State University, "came upon a reference to a work by Aegidius Menagius, Historia Mullierum Philosopharum, published in 1690 and 1692. [Waithe] had never heard of any women philosophers prior to the 20th century with the exceptions of Queen Christina of Sweden, known as Descartes' student, and Hildegard von Bingen, who lived in the 12th century." After she obtained a copy of this book, she discovered that "many of the women [Menagius] listed as philosophers were astronomers, astrologers, gynecologists, or simply relatives of male philosophers. Nevertheless, the list of women alleged to have been philosophers was impressive." At this point, she decided to "create a team of experts to collaborate with...I placed a notice in the SWIP (Society for Women in Philosophy) Newsletter and received a half-dozen responses from philosophers". This collaborative project led to the publication of the four-volume A History of Women Philosophers, published 1987–1995, which includes the following sections:

- Volume 1, Ancient Women Philosophers (1987) 600 BC-500 AD, Aspasia of Miletus, Diotima of Mantinea, Julia Domna, Makrina, and Hypatia of Alexandria.
- Volume II, Medieval, Renaissance and Enlightenment Women Philosophers (1989) 500–1600, Hildegard of Bingen, Heloise, Mechtild of Magdeburg, Julian of Norwich, Catherine of Siena, and others.
- Volume III, Modern Women Philosophers (1991) 1600–1900, Margaret Cavendish, Kristina (Queen of Sweden), Anne Finch (Viscountess Conway), Sor Juana, Mary Wollstonecraft, Harriet Hardy Taylor Mill, and dozens of others.
- Volume IV, Contemporary Women Philosophers (1995) 1900–present, Lady Victoria Welby, Charlotte Perkins Gilman, Lou Salome, L. Susan Stebbing, Edith Stein, Ayn Rand, Hannah Arendt, Edith Stein, Simone Weil, and many others.

At the 2002 conference for Canadian Society for Women in Philosophy, Dr. Nancy Tuana asserted the evolutionary theory that the clitoris is unnecessary in reproduction and therefore it has been "historically ignored," mainly because of "a fear of pleasure. It is pleasure separated from reproduction. That's the fear". She reasoned that this fear is the cause of the ignorance that veils female sexuality. The received view, advanced by Stephen Jay Gould suggests that muscular contractions associated with orgasms pull sperm from the vagina to the cervix, where it is in a better position to reach the egg. Dr. Tuana's proposal challenged the view previously accepted by male biologists.

== Publications ==
- Helen Beebee; Jenny Saul (September 2011). Women in philosophy in the UK – a report by the British Philosophical Association and the Society for Women in Philosophy UK. Joint BPA/SWIP Committee for Women in Philosophy.
