= Fiona Jenkins =

Australian philosopher and gender studies researcher

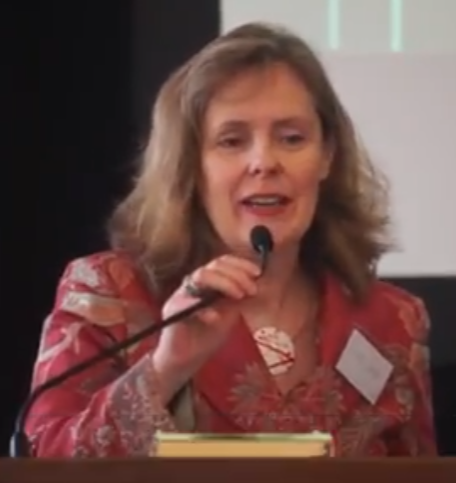
- Speaking at ANU Feminist Utopias 2017
- Born: 1965 (age 59–60)
- Education: Balliol College, Oxford (PhD), Sussex University (MA)
- Era: 21st-century philosophy
- Region: Western philosophy
- School: Continental
- Institutions: Australian National University
- Thesis: Becoming What We Are: A Study of Revaluation, Realism and Self-Representation in Nietzsche's Writings (1996)
- Doctoral advisor: Bernard Williams and Alan Montefiore
- Main interests: Feminist Theory, Cultural Theory, Screen And Media Culture, Poststructuralism, Social Philosophy
- Website: https://researchers.anu.edu.au/researchers/jenkins-fk?term=fiona%20jenkins

Fiona Jenkins (born 1965) is an Australian philosopher and Associate Professor of Philosophy at the Australian National University (ANU). She is known for her works on feminist theory, the status of women in philosophy and Nietzschean philosophy. Jenkins was the convenor of the ANU Gender Institute from 2012 to 2015.

== Books ==
- Women in Philosophy: What Needs to Change?, Fiona Jenkins and Katrina Hutchison (eds), Oxford University Press, 2013
- Allegiance and Identity in a Globalised World, Fiona Jenkins, Mark Nolan and Kim Rubenstein (eds), Cambridge University Press, 2014

== See also ==
- 4 Months, 3 Weeks and 2 Days
- Margaret Jolly
- Jennifer Saul
