= Victoria Browne =

British feminist philosopher

Victoria Browne is a British feminist philosopher. She is currently a reader in political philosophy at Loughborough University, where she has worked since 2023. Her research addresses questions around time and pregnancy. She is part of the editorial collective of Radical Philosophy and the co-editor-in-chief of Hypatia.

== Career ==
Browne read for bachelor's and master's degrees at SOAS University of London, and then went on to read for a doctorate in philosophy at the University of Liverpool, where she was supervised by Gillian Howie. In 2012, she became part of the editorial collective for Radical Philosophy. She graduated from Liverpool in 2013 and began lecturing at Oxford Brookes University.

Her first monograph, Feminism, Time, and Nonlinear History, was published in 2014 by Palgrave Macmillan. The book draws upon phenomenology, hermeneutics, sociology, and political science to investigate feminist approaches to time. In 2016, Browne and Daniel Whistler published the edited collection On the Feminist Philosophy of Gillian Howie with Bloomsbury Academic. From 2017 to 2018, Browne was a visiting scholar at Columbia University's Institute for Research on Women, Gender and Sexuality. She published her second monograph, Pregnancy Without Birth, in 2021 with Bloomsbury Academic. In this book, she argues that miscarriage is overlooked in philosophical explorations of pregnancy, and that reflection on miscarriage can separate pregnancy from reproductive futurism.

In 2023, Browne joined Loughborough University as a senior lecturer in political philosophy, and, the following year, she became co-editor-in-chief of the feminist philosophy journal Hypatia. In 2025, she started the two-year Feminist Miscarriage Project, funded by the Arts and Humanities Research Council, with Susie Kilshaw of University College London. She was promoted to reader at Loughborough in 2026.

== Selected publications ==
- Victoria Browne (2014). Feminism, Time, and Nonlinear History. Palgrave Macmillan.
- Victoria Browne and Daniel Whistler, eds. (2016). On the Feminist Philosophy of Gillian Howie: Materialism and Mortality. Bloomsbury Academic.
- Barrie Axford, Victoria Browne, Richard Huggins and Rico Isaacs (2018). Politics: An Introduction, 3rd edition. Routledge.
- Gill Rye, Victoria Browne, Adalgisa Giorgio, Emily Jeremiah, and Abigail Lee Six, eds. (2018). Motherhood in Literature and Culture: Interdisciplinary Perspectives from Europe. Routledge.
- Victoria Browne, Jason Danely, and Doerthe Rosenow, eds. (2021). Vulnerability and the Politics of Care: Transdisciplinary Dialogues. British Academy.
- Victoria Browne (2021). Pregnancy Without Birth: A Feminist Philosophy of Miscarriage. Bloomsbury Academic.
