= Linda López McAlister =

American philosopher and academic (1939–2021)

Linda López McAlister (October 10, 1939 – November 9, 2021) was an American philosopher and academic. She held several positions in academia, spending much of her career at the University of South Florida (USF). She became professor emerita of Philosophy at USF in 1999. She also worked as a radio film critic and ran her own theatrical company.

== Biography ==
McAlister attended Barnard College and earned a Ph.D. in philosophy from Cornell University. As a Senior Fulbright Researcher at the University of Würzburg, she worked with a colleague to organize the first meeting of female philosophers in Germany. That event led to the establishment of the International Association of Women Philosophers.

Early in her career, she taught at Brooklyn College and San Diego State University. After three years as dean of the USF Fort Myers campus, McAlister was an administrator for the State University System of Florida. From 1987 until her 1999 retirement, she returned to USF, teaching philosophy and women's studies. For her last three years at USF, she was a department chair.

She was a past editor (1990–95) and co-editor (1995–98) of Hypatia: A Journal of Feminist Philosophy. She translated and edited the English edition of Psychology from an Empirical Standpoint by Austrian philosopher Franz Brentano. She organized the 1998 conference of the International Association of Women Philosophers; it was the organization's eighth conference and the first held outside of Europe. In the same year, the Society for Women in Philosophy named her the Distinguished Woman Philosopher of the Year. She also helped translate Ludwig Wittgenstein's Remarks on Colour (1977).

McAlister was a radio film critic for The Women's Show on WMNF in Tampa from 1990 to 1999. She has hosted Radio Theatre for KUNM in Albuquerque since 2004. She founded a theatrical company associated with the National Hispanic Cultural Center known as Camino Real Productions.

She married Sharon Bode in 2008. McAlister died of heart failure in Albuquerque on November 9, 2021.
