= Sara Ruddick =

American philosopher

Sara Ruddick (born Sara Elizabeth Loop; February 17, 1935 – March 20, 2011) was a feminist philosopher and the author of Maternal Thinking: Toward a Politics of Peace.

== Education and career ==
Ruddick earned an A.B. at Vassar College in 1957 and a Ph.D. from Harvard University in 1964. She taught philosophy and women's studies at the New School of Social Research for forty years. She was awarded the Distinguished Woman Philosopher of the Year Award by the Society for Women in Philosophy in 2002. A panel celebrating her work was held at the American Philosophical Association meeting in San Diego in 2012. She participated in the oral history project, Feminist Philosophers: In Their Own Words, which provides interviews with important feminist philosophers involved in the Women's Movement during the 1960s and 1970s.

== Research and publications ==
Ruddick is best known for her analysis of the practices of thinking that emerge from the care of children. She argued that mothering is a conscious activity that calls for choices, daily decisions and a continuing, alert reflectiveness. Lisa Baraitser describes her contribution: "Along with Adrienne Rich, Ruddick was probably the most important philosophical thinker to address the issue of mothering and motherhood since second-wave feminism, and in a similar spirit to that of Grace Paley, to extend her analysis of mothering under patriarchy to the development of the values necessary to oppose militarism and war."

== Bibliography ==
- Polly F. Radosh, "Sara Ruddick's Theory of Maternal Thinking Applied To Traditional Irish Mothering," Journal of Family History, 33,3 (2008), 304–315.
