= Joan Callahan =

American philosopher (1946–2019)

Joan C. Callahan
- Born: March 29, 1946
- Died: June 6, 2019 (aged 73); Lawrenceburg, Kentucky, U.S.
- School: Feminism
- Institutions: University of Kentucky, University of Maryland, College Park, Louisiana State University
- Main interests: Feminist theory, critical race theory, ethics

Joan Callahan (March 29, 1946 – June 6, 2019) was a Professor Emerita of Philosophy at the University of Kentucky, an institution where she taught for more than twenty years and served in a variety of roles, including as director of the Gender and Women's Studies Program. Callahan's research has focused on feminist theory, critical race theory, ethics, social and political philosophy, the philosophy of law, and on the junctions of these topics.

== Education and career ==
Callahan received a bachelor's degree in philosophy from the University of Massachusetts, Dartmouth in 1976, before going on to receive a master's degree in the Humanities from Simmons College in 1977, and a master's and doctorate in philosophy from the University of Maryland, College Park, in 1979 and 1982, respectively.

After receiving her doctorate, Callahan accepted a position as instructor in the Department of Philosophy at Louisiana State University in 1982, before being promoted to assistant professor in 1983. In 1986, she left Louisiana State University to accept an appointment as assistant professor in the Department of Philosophy at the University of Kentucky, the institution where she would spend the remainder of her career. She was promoted to associate professor in 1988, and full professor in 1995. She received emeritus status in 2011. From 1998 to 2003, and again from 2004 to 2006, Callahan served as director of the Women's Studies Program, going on to serve as director of the renamed Gender and Women's Studies program from 2006 to 2007. Callahan was also a member of the Graduate Faculty of the Social Theory Program from 1992 to 2011, a member of the Graduate Faculty of the Women's Studies Program from 1994 to 2011, and a Faculty Associate at the Center for Bioethics from 2005 to 2011. Besides for her regular appointments, Callahan also served as an instructor in the Department of Philosophy at Simmons College during summer sessions between 1977 and 1980, was a research associate at the School of Medicine, Uniformed Services University of the Health Sciences from 1979 to 1981, and as a lecturer in the Department of Philosophy at the University of Maryland, College Park from 1979 to 1981.

Callahan served on the editorial board of the American Philosophical Association's Newsletter on Feminism and Philosophy from 1990 to 1994 (and later served as editor of said newsletter from 1998 to 2003), the editorial board of Gender, Race, and Class from 1994 to 1998, the editorial board of Professional Ethics from 1993 to the present, the editorial board of The Florida Philosophical Review from 2000 to the present, the editorial board of The Journal of Social Philosophy from 2003 to the present, and was an associate editor of Hypatia: A Journal of Feminist Philosophy from 2007 to 2011. Callahan has also served in a variety of roles in the American Philosophical Association and a large variety of professional associations related to philosophy and feminism. In 2007, Callahan received the U.S. Society for Women in Philosophy's Distinguished Women Philosophers award.

== Research areas ==
Callahan's work has focused on social and political philosophy, the philosophy of law, and practical ethics, taken from a feminist or critical theory approach. She has investigated a wide variety of topics during her career, with an especial focus on professional ethics, social and political philosophy, the philosophy of law, and healthcare ethics and the ethics of care. She has additionally published in areas such as reproductive ethics, the ethical implications of disability laws, the ethics of care, and the ethics and implications of religious practices in healthcare ethics and many others.

== Publications ==
Callahan has published a very large number of peer-reviewed papers, and has contributed a number of book chapters. She's also contributed to and edited four volumes, Reproduction, Ethics, and the Law: Feminist Perspectives, Menopause: A Midlife Passage, Preventing Birth: Contemporary Methods and Related Moral Controversies, and Ethical Issues in Professional Life. Callahan is currently producing, with Nancy Tuana, a collection of videos titled Feminist Philosophers: In Their Own Words, that features interviews with many of the first philosophers to introduce feminist concerns in to North American philosophy.

Reproduction, Ethics, and the Law was hailed in Hypatia: A Journal of Feminist Philosophy as an "engaging, skilfully edited contribution to the literature on human reproduction" that represented "proof positive of the beyond-abortion sea change."
