= Ilaria Brocchini =

French philosopher (born 1966)

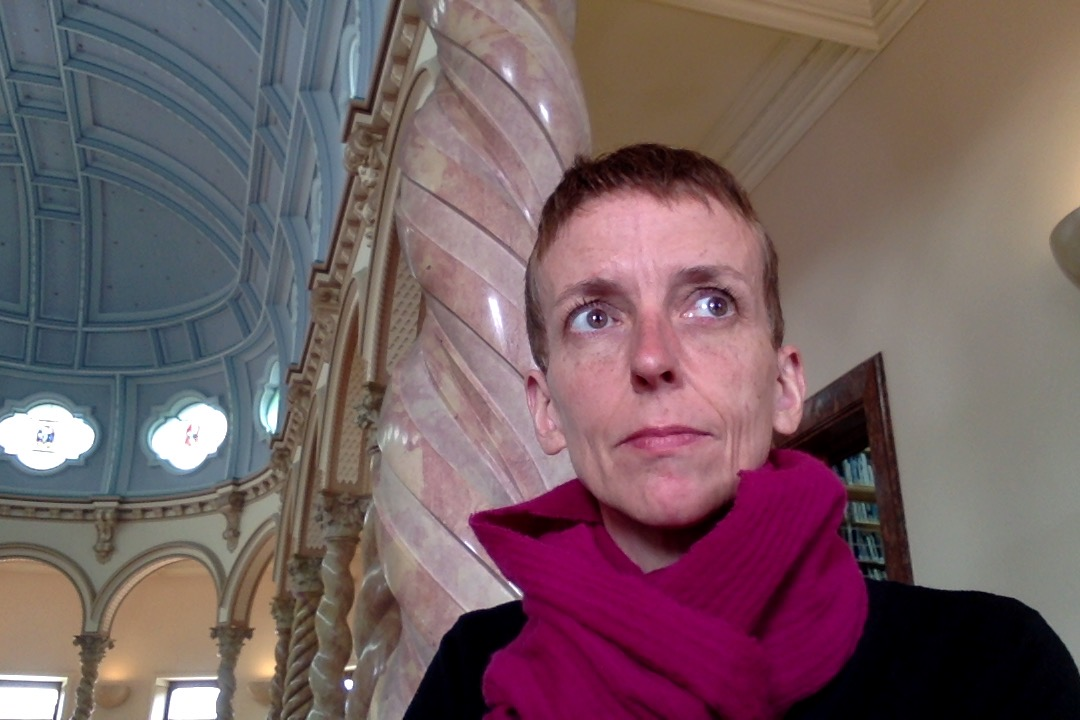
- Born: 1966 (age 59–60); Italy

Academic background
- Education: Paris 1 Panthéon-Sorbonne University

Academic work
- Era: Contemporary philosophy
- School or tradition: Philosophy of belief, Philosophy of aesthetics
- Main interests: Belief, waiting, appearances, evil, Walter Benjamin
- Notable ideas: Concept of traces (objects as carriers of belief and memory)

Ilaria Brocchini is a contemporary philosopher writing in French. Her work examines belief as a fundamental structure of human existence, alongside reason. By analyzing traces, appearances, waiting, and evil, she develops a philosophy of believing that reinterprets classical problems and informs contemporary debates on secular faith, cultural identity, and the ethical challenges of mortality in science and medicine.

== Life ==
Brocchini studied philosophy and architecture in Italy, Germany, and France and received her doctorate in 2005 from the Faculty of Philosophy at the Paris 1 Panthéon-Sorbonne University with a thesis on the philosopher Walter Benjamin.

At the Maison des sciences de l'Homme Paris-Nord, she participated in the research project "Arts, Appareils, Diffusion" with the philosopher Jean-Louis Déotte.

Brocchini lives and works in Geneva.

== Work ==
Brocchini's research focuses on the relationship between reason and faith.

For Brocchini, in every era, humans are simultaneously both believing and rational beings, and never either one or the other.

Brocchini is interested in how this relationship shapes the material world. Faith transforms material beings into what Brocchini calls "traces". Traces have an aura, in the sense of the philosopher Walter Benjamin.

This process never ends because humans are and remain simultaneously believing and rational beings.

In her most recent works, Brocchini explores the coexistence of reason and belief in contemporary societies.

Even in contemporary societies disenchantment—contrary to Max Weber's hypothesis—is neither complete nor desirable according to her.

In L'attente en philosophie (“Awaiting in Philosophy”), she offers a philosophical elucidation of awaiting, which she understands as an act of imagination and consent to the unknowable. Awaiting is a creative approach to the future, closely related to faith.

In Le Mal: Raisons et Croyance (“Evil: Reasons and Belief”), Brocchini examines the relationship between the moral concept of evil and death. The human belief in the existence of evil is related to death from which humanity continues to suffer.

== Philosophical contribution ==
Brocchini’s work positions belief as a central category of philosophical inquiry. Rather than treating belief as a residue of religion or a weakness of knowledge, she presents it as a primary structure of the life of the mind, a condition upon which reason itself operates. This approach marks a departure from the traditional primacy of reason in Western philosophy.

Her thesis produces several conceptual effects:

- It de-hierarchizes the relationship between reason and belief, emphasizing their co-constitution rather than opposition.
- It unifies heterogeneous experiences—such as traces, appearances, waiting, and evil—under the category of believing-in.
- It re-interprets classical notions (appearance/essence, time, evil) through the existential primacy of belief.

In this framework, belief functions not as irrationality but as orientation, while reason provides clarification. Brocchini’s contribution thus consists in reframing belief as a lived transcendental condition: without belief, reason does not apply to human reality. This co-constitutive model offers a renewed framework for addressing enduring philosophical problems—object, appearance, time, evil—and for guiding contemporary debates on what to believe, how to believe, and to what extent belief should be sustained.

== Primary literature ==
- Le Mal. Raisons et Croyance, L’Harmattan, 2024.
- L'attente en philosophie, L’Harmattan, 2021.
- En deçà des apparences, L’Harmattan, 2018.
- Les traces de la croyance, L’Harmattan, 2015.
- with Paul Scheerbart: Écrits sur la technique militaire, L’Harmattan, 2008.
- Trace et disparition dans l’œuvre de Walter Benjamin, L’Harmattan, 2005.

== Secondary literature ==
- PhilPapers, Ilaria Brocchini
- Francesco d'Antonio « Regards féminins et espace d'attente », Les Langues néo-latines. Revue de langues vivantes romanes, 410, 2024.
- Jean-Louis Déotte, Cosmétiques: Simondon, Panofsky, Lyotard, Éditions des maisons des sciences de l’homme associées, Paris, 2018.
- Jean-Louis Déotte, W. Benjamin littéralement. Dialogues avec I. Brocchini, M. Bubb, A. Brossat, L’Harmattan, Paris, 2017.
- Adolfo Vera, « Benjamin : image, trace et politique », Revue philosophique Appareil, 2013.
- Bernd Witte, L'asservissement du sujet moderne, 2012.
- Claudia Alvares, Representing Culture: Essays on Identity, Visuality and Technology, Cambridge Scholars Publishing, 2009.
- Jean Louis Déotte « Trace et disparition à partir de l’œuvre de W. Benjamin d’Ilaria Brocchini », Revue philosophique Appareil, 2006.
- Colloque Centre Culturel International de Cerisy-La-Salle, Walter Benjamin, traversées
- Maison des Sciences Humaines et sociales Paris Nord
