= Laurie Shrage =

American political and moral philosopher (born 1953)

Laurie J. Shrage
- Born: December 4, 1953 (age 72)

Laurie J. Shrage (born December 4, 1953) is an American political and moral philosopher whose analysis of the agendas for social change advanced by gender and sexual dissidents has been influential.

== Education and career ==
Shrage has taught at Howard University, Lake Forest College, Scripps College, California State Polytechnic University, and now teaches at Florida International University. She earned her B.A. (1975) from the University of California, Davis and her M.A. (1979) and Ph.D (1983) from the University of California, San Diego, Philosophy.

In her first book, Moral Dilemmas of Feminism: Prostitution, Adultery, and Abortion (1994), Shrage argued for empirically informed philosophical analyses of moral problems. She argued against the possibility of offering a universal social ethics and, as an alternative, she developed an interpretive approach to moral problems, based in part on the work of Charles Taylor.

Her second book, Abortion and Social Responsibility: Depolarizing the Debate (2003), argues for reconsidering the American Law Institute's model abortion law developed prior to Roe v. Wade. Shrage explores abortion policies around the world, the history of reform and repeal movements in the U.S., moral and legal debates, and ethnographies of pro-life and pro-choice groups, and then recommends restricting elective abortions to roughly the end of the first trimester, in order to balance competing rights and values.

Shrage was a Laurance S. Rockefeller Visiting Fellow at the Center for Human Values at Princeton University (2011–12) and a fellow at the Stanford Humanities Center (1998–99). She was a co-editor of the journal Hypatia: A Journal of Feminist Philosophy from 1998-2003. She has served as the American Philosophical Association's Ombuds for Non-Discrimination, 2008–11, and as the Program Chair for the American Philosophical Association, Pacific Division meeting in 2001. She was Director of Women's Studies at FIU (2008–11).

== Research areas ==
Shrage's work evaluates public policies on markets in sexual services and expressive materials, reproductive health care, legal gender identity, and marriage. She is more interested in the active application of philosophical theory to inform public debate - in what she terms "empirically informed philosophy" - than she is in focusing her work on a particular school of philosophical thought. She suggests that moral and political philosophers should pay more attention to historical and scientific accounts of political and moral problems than they currently do.

== Selected bibliography ==
=== Books ===
- Shrage, Laurie (2003). Abortion and social responsibility: depolarizing the debate. Oxford New York: Oxford University Press. ISBN 9780195153095.
- Shrage, Laurie J. (2009). You've changed" sex reassignment and personal identity. Oxford New York: Oxford University Press. ISBN 9780199745029.
- Shrage, Laurie (2013). Moral dilemmas of feminism: Prostitution, adultery, and abortion. Hoboken: Taylor and Francis. ISBN 9781134977697.

=== Journal articles ===
- Shrage, Laurie (January 1989). "Should feminists oppose prostitution". Ethics. 99 (2). University of Chicago Press: 347–361. doi:10.1086/293069. JSTOR 2381438. S2CID 143685605.
