= Linda Martín Alcoff =

American philosopher

- Born: July 25, 1955 (age 71); Panama
- Other name: Linda Alcoff

Education
- Education: Georgia State University (BA, MA); Brown University (PhD)
- Doctoral advisor: Ernest Sosa

Philosophical work
- Era: Contemporary philosophy
- Region: Western philosophy
- School: Continental philosophy; feminist philosophy
- Institutions: Hunter College; CUNY Graduate Center
- Main interests: Social epistemology; feminist philosophy; philosophy of gender and race; Foucault

Linda Martín Alcoff (born July 25, 1955) is a Panamanian American philosopher and professor of philosophy at Hunter College, City University of New York. Alcoff specializes in social epistemology, feminist philosophy, philosophy of race, decolonial theory and continental philosophy, especially the work of Michel Foucault. She has authored or edited more than a dozen books, including Visible Identities: Race, Gender, and the Self (2006), The Future of Whiteness (2015), and Rape and Resistance (2018). Her public philosophy writing has been published in The Guardian and The New York Times.

Alcoff has called for greater inclusion of historically underrepresented groups in philosophy. She notes that philosophers from these groups have created new fields of inquiry, including feminist philosophy, critical race theory, Latino philosophy, and LGBTQ philosophy. From 2012 to 2013, she served as president of the American Philosophical Association, Eastern Division. In February 2018 she was appointed president of the board of directors of Hypatia, Inc., the non-profit corporation that owns the feminist philosophy journal Hypatia.

== Early life and education ==
Alcoff was born in Panama, the younger of two daughters to an Irish mother, Laura, and Panamanian father, Miguel Angel Martín, who met while studying at Florida State University. Her father became a professor of history at the Universidad de Panama. When her parents separated, Alcoff moved with her mother and sister to Florida when she was three. In 1980 she earned a BA with honors in philosophy from Georgia State University and in 1983 an MA, also in philosophy. She did her doctoral work at Brown University, completing her dissertation under the direction of Ernest Sosa, Martha Nussbaum, and Richard Schmitt and receiving her PhD in 1987.

== Career ==
=== Positions held ===
After spending a year as assistant professor of philosophy at Kalamazoo College, Alcoff moved to Syracuse University, where she taught for the next ten years. She was tenured and promoted to associate professor in 1995 and full professor in 1999. She held visiting positions at Cornell University (1994–1995), Aarhus University (November 1999), Florida Atlantic University (Fall 2000), and Brown University (Spring 2001). She took a position as professor of philosophy and women's studies at Stony Brook University in 2002. In 2009 she became professor of philosophy at Hunter College and the City University of New York Graduate Center.

Alcoff has long advocated for diversifying the discipline of philosophy. To help address these issues, with Paul Taylor and William Wilkerson, she started the "Pluralist's Guide to Philosophy". From 2010 to 2013 Alcoff was joint editor-in-chief, with Ann Cudd, of the feminist philosophy journal Hypatia. She served on its board of associate editors during the Hypatia transracialism controversy in 2017. The journal's management subsequently established a task force to resolve the journal's governance issues; Alcoff became president of the board of directors of Hypatia, Inc., in February 2018.

=== Research ===
Alcoff has written widely on subjects including Foucault, sexual violence, the politics of epistemology, gender and race identity, and Latino issues. She has authored four books: Real Knowing: New Versions of Coherence Theory (1996), Visible Identities: Race, Gender and the Self (2006), The Future of Whiteness (2015), and Rape and Resistance (2018). She has also edited ten volumes, written scores of peer-reviewed articles, and contributed a large number of book and encyclopedia chapters and entries. According to Google Scholar, her most widely read article, "The Problem of Speaking for Others" (1991) in Cultural Critique, has been cited nearly 3000 times.

Visible Identities: Race, Gender and the Self attempted to offer a unified account of social identity by bridging her previous work in epistemology, metaphysics, and the politics of ethnicity, race, and gender. In it, Alcoff suggested that geographic location has significant implications for social identity above and beyond those conveyed by other contributors to identity (although she does not view such implications as deterministic).

In "The Problem of Speaking for Others", Alcoff analyzes problems of representation that accompany the practice of speaking for others, using social epistemological concepts such as social location and social identity. She suggests "four sets of interrogatory practices" to guide acts of speaking for others across social positions: First, one's own impetus to speak should be interrogated to ensure it is not motivated by a "desire for mastery and domination". Second, one ought to recognize the significance of location and context, especially the connections between our locations and our words and how transporting words to another social location will shift their meaning. Third, she emphasizes accountability and responsibility to those whose views are to be represented; one ought to remain open to criticism. Fourth, it is crucial to recognize the possible and real effects of words on the discursive and material context of those represented.

== Awards and recognitions ==
Alcoff has received several honors and awards, including an honorary doctorate from the University of Oslo in September 2011, and the Caribbean Philosophical Association's Frantz Fanon Prize for 2009 for her book Visible Identities: Race, Gender and the Self. She was recognized as a Distinguished Woman in Philosophy by the Society for Women in Philosophy in 2005, and she held the Meredith Professorship for Excellence in Teaching at Syracuse University from 1995 to 1998. In 2023, she was elected to the American Academy of Arts and Sciences for her work in philosophy.

== Selected works ==
- Alcoff, Linda Martín (1996). Real Knowing: New Versions of the Coherence Theory. New York: Cornell University Press. ISBN 9780801430473.
- Alcoff, Linda (1997). "Cultural feminism versus post-structuralism: the identity crisis in feminist theory". In Nicholson, Linda (ed.). The Second Wave: A Reader in Feminist Theory. New York: Routledge. pp. 330–355. ISBN 9780415917612.
- Alcoff, Linda Martín (2006). Visible Identities: Race, Gender and the Self. Oxford University Press.
- Alcoff, Linda; Kittay, Eva (2007). The Blackwell Guide to Feminist Philosophy. Malden, MA, and Oxford: Blackwell Publishing. ISBN 9780631224273.
- Alcoff, Linda Martín (2015). The Future of Whiteness. Cambridge and Malden, MA: Polity Press.
- Alcoff, Linda Martín (2018). Rape and Resistance. Polity Press. ISBN 9780745691916.

== See also ==
- American philosophy
- List of American philosophers
