= Jennifer Saul =

American philosopher

Jennifer Mather Saul (born 19 February 1968) is a philosopher working in philosophy of language and philosophy of feminism. Saul is a professor of philosophy at the University of Sheffield and the University of Waterloo, and a Professorial Fellow at the University of St Andrews.

== Biography ==
Saul holds a bachelor's degree from the University of Rochester and a master's degree and PhD from Princeton University, where she studied under Scott Soames.

Saul co-wrote a report for the British Philosophical Association and Society for Women in Philosophy UK with Helen Beebee titled "Women in Philosophy in the UK: A Report". Saul frequently writes comments on women in philosophy, in a variety of non-academic publications.

Saul was co-founder and co-blogger for the Feminist Philosophers, a forum that focuses on gender biases. The forum's Gender Conference Campaign aimed to highlight the lack of participation and representation of female philosophers at world events.

== Research areas ==
Saul's primary research is in analytic philosophy of language and feminist philosophy. In her 2012 book from Oxford University Press, Lying, Misleading and What is Said: An Exploration in Philosophy of Language and in Ethics, she argues that the distinction between lying and misleading is theoretically significant and illuminates a variety of issues in philosophy of language concerning semantic content, implicature, and assertion. Moreover, because it is also an ethically meaningful distinction, it demonstrates some ways in which communication and speech are apt for ethical analysis. Saul argues that it is not the case, in general, that lying is ethically worse than misleading. Luvell Anderson, in his review of the book, says that "Her book is an excellent addition to a growing literature of what might be considered applied philosophy of language". This work led to Saul being an advisor to the UK Office of Statistics Regulation in developing its work on misleadingness in the use of statistics, where any false belief is contingent on available evidence.

In philosophy of language, Saul is also known for her work on substitution of co-referential terms in simple sentences. Although it is universally accepted that substitution fails in propositional attitude contexts, Saul argues that substitution can also fail in sentences that have no psychological verbs whatsoever. This raises questions about the semantics of names and dominant accounts of attitude reports. In 2007, Saul published Simple Sentences, Substitution and Intuitions (Oxford University Press) in which she develops her views on these issues with attention to their methodological implications. Jennifer Duke-Yonge says of the book, "Saul advances the study of simple sentence substitution failure by demonstrating the inadequacy of existing accounts, but perhaps more importantly this book brings into focus crucial questions about the problematic role of semantic intuitions, frequently used without question in philosophy of language. In an area like philosophy of language where intuitions are often the primary kind of data we have available, this focused study of their role and nature is to be welcomed".

In feminist philosophy, Saul is known for her book Feminism: Issues & Arguments, Oxford University Press (2003), an introductory text that explores a variety of feminist views and explores their application to controversies over such topics as pornography, abortion, and veiling. Louise Antony says, "Saul's accessible and engaging introduction to philosophical issues in feminism will challenge students of all political persuasions. Modelling good philosophical method all the way, Saul draws her readers into some of the most important and interesting controversies of contemporary gender studies." She has also done important work on pornography, objectification, and the history of the vibrator.

From 2011-2013, Saul was Director of the Leverhulme-funded Implicit Bias and Philosophy International Research Project. The project brought together nearly 100 researchers in philosophy and psychology to explore the implications of research on implicit bias and related topics for epistemology, philosophy of mind, and moral/political philosophy.

== Awards ==
In December 2011, Saul was awarded the Distinguished Woman Philosopher award in Washington, D.C. by the Society for Women in Philosophy. In response to the award, Saul said, "I'm deeply honored and absolutely stunned by this. It's especially wonderful to be recognized as making a difference in people's lives by doing philosophy. For me, that's the highest honor there could be."

== Publications ==
=== Books ===
- Saul, Jennifer Mather (2024). Dogwhistles and figleaves: how manipulative language spreads racism and falsehood. Oxford: Oxford University Press. ISBN 978-0-19-287175-6. OCLC 1374422182.
- Saul, Jennifer Mather (2015). Lying, misleading, and what is said: an exploration in philosophy of language and in ethics. Oxford: Oxford university press. ISBN 978-0-19-874411-5.
- Simple Sentences, Substitution, and Intuitions (Oxford University Press, 2007)
- Feminism: Issues & Arguments (Oxford University Press, 2003)

=== Papers and articles ===
- "Politically Significant Terms and Philosophy of Language: Methodological Issues", in Analytic Feminist Contributions to Traditional Philosophy, edited by Anita Superson and Sharon Crasnow (Oxford University Press, 2012)
- "Implicit Bias, Stereotype Threat and Women in Philosophy", in Women in Philosophy: What Needs to Change? edited by Fiona Jenkins and Katrina Hutchison, (Oxford University Press 2013)
- "Just Go Ahead and Lie", Analysis, January 2012
- "Rankings of Quality and Rankings of Reputation: Problems for both from Implicit Bias", Journal of Social Philosophy, 2012
- "Maker's Knowledge or Perpetuator's Ignorance?" Jurisprudence, 2012
- "Conversational Implicature, Speaker Meaning, and Calculability" Klaus Petrus (ed.) Meaning and Analysis: New Essays on H. Paul Grice, (Palgrave MacMillan, 2010)
- "Conversational Implicature, Speaker Meaning, and Calculability", Klaus Petrus (ed.) Meaning and Analysis: New Essays on H. Paul Grice, Palgrave 2010, 170-183.
- "Speaker Meaning, What is Said, and What is Implicated", Noûs, Vol.36 No.2, 2002, pp 228–248
- "What is Said and Psychological Reality: Grice's Project And Relevance Theorists' Criticisms", Linguistics and Philosophy, 25, 2002, pp 347–372.
- "What are Intensional Transitives?", Proceedings of the Aristotelian Society, 2002, Supplementary Volume LXXVI, 2002, pp 101–120.
- (with David Braun) "Simple Sentences, Substitution, and Mistaken Evaluations", Philosophical Studies, Vol. 111, 2002, pp 1–41.
