= Alison Wylie =

Canadian philosopher of archaeology (born 1954)

- Born: 1954 (age 71–72); Swindon, England

Education
- Thesis: Positivism and the New Archeology (1982)
- Doctoral advisor: Rom Harré

Philosophical work
- Era: 20th-century philosophy
- Region: Western philosophy
- School: Analytic philosophy, feminist philosophy
- Main interests: Philosophy of science; Philosophy of social science; Philosophy of archaeology; Feminist philosophy

Alison Wylie FRSC FAHA (born 1954) is a Canadian philosopher of archaeology. She is a professor of philosophy at the University of British Columbia and holds a Canada Research Chair in Philosophy of the Social and Historical Sciences. Her chair was renewed in 2025. She was elected as a Fellow of the British Academy in 2023 and awarded an honorary doctorate from Erasmus University in 2024.

Wylie specializes in philosophy of science, research ethics, and feminism in the social sciences, particularly archaeology and anthropology.

== Early life and education ==
Wylie was born in 1954 in Swindon, England. She grew up in Canada and obtained her undergraduate degree in Philosophy and Sociology from Mount Allison University in 1976. She then studied at Binghamton University, where she obtained an MA degree in anthropology (1979), and a PhD in philosophy through the short-lived Program for History and Philosophy of the Social and Behavioral Sciences (1982). Her doctoral dissertation was titled Positivism and the New Archeology, supervised by Rom Harré.

== Academic career ==
Wylie has held faculty appointments at University of Western Ontario (1985–1998), Washington University in St. Louis (1998–2003), Barnard/Columbia University (2003–2005), the University of Washington (2005–2017) and Durham University (2013-2017). She has also held visiting positions at the Australian National University, Reading University, Stanford University, the École des hautes études en sciences sociales in Paris, UC Berkeley, New York University, the University of Denver, and Durham University. She is currently a professor in the philosophy department of the University of British Columbia.

Wylie co-chaired the Society for American Archaeology's (SAA) committee on ethics in archaeology, which drafted the Principles of Archaeological Ethics in use by the SAA. Wylie received a Presidential Recognition Award from the SAA in 1995 for this work.

She was the senior editor of Hypatia, A Journal of Feminist Philosophy between 2008 and 2013 and was named Distinguished Woman Philosopher of the year by the Society for Women in Philosophy in 2013. She served as the president of the American Philosophical Association Pacific Division between 2011 and 2012 and was the president of the Philosophy of Science Association (2019-2020). In November 2019 Wylie was elected a corresponding fellow of the Australian Academy of the Humanities. She was elected as a Fellow of the British Academy in 2023 and awarded an honorary doctorate from Erasmus University in 2024.

Wylie gave the 2019 Alan Saunders Memorial Lecture (Australasian Association of Philosophy and Australian Broadcast Corporation); the 2018 Distinguished Lecture for the Forum for History of the Human Sciences; the 2017 Dewey Lecture, Pacific Division of the American Philosophical Association; the 2016 Katz Distinguished lecture at the University of Washington; the 2013 Springer Lecture, European Philosophy of Science Association; the 2013 Mulvaney Lecture, Australian National University; and the 2008 Patty Jo Watson Distinguished Lecturer, Archaeology Division, American Anthropological Association.

== Selected works ==
Books:
- (2016). Evidential Reasoning in Archaeology, co-authored with Robert Chapman, Bloomsbury Academic Publishing, London: Bloomsbury.
- (2015). Material Evidence, Learning from Archaeological Practice, co-edited with Robert Chapman, London: Routledge.
- (2007). Value-Free Science? Ideals and Illusions, co-edited with Harold Kincaid and John Dupré, Oxford: Oxford University Press.
- (2002). Thinking From Things: Essays in the Philosophy of Archaeology, Berkeley CA: University of California Press.
- (1995). Ethics in American Archaeology: Challenges for the 1990s, co-edited with Mark J. Lynott, Washington D.C.: Society for American Archaeology Special Report Series.
- (1995). Breaking Anonymity: The Chilly Climate for Women Faculty, co-edited with members of the Chilly Collective, Waterloo, Ontario: Wilfrid Laurier University Press.
- (1994). Equity Issues for Women in Archaeology, co-edited with Margaret C. Nelson and Sarah M. Nelson, Washington, D.C.: Archeological Papers of the American Anthropological Association, Number 5.

Special issues and Symposia:

- Hypatia thematic clusters: Women in Philosophy: The Costs of Exclusion, and Epistemic Justice, Ignorance, and Procedural Objectivity (editor), Hypatia 26.2 (2011).
- Feminist Legacies / Feminist Futures, 25th Anniversary Special Issue of Hypatia, A Journal of Feminist Philosophy, co-edited with Lori Gruen, 25.4 (2010).
- Doing Archaeology as a Feminist, Special Issue of the Journal of Archaeological Method and Theory, guest edited with Margaret W. Conkey, 14.3 (2007).
- Epistemic Diversity and Dissent, Special Issue of Episteme: Journal of Social Epistemology, guest editor, 3.1 (2006).
- Feminist Science Studies, Special Issue of Hypatia, A Journal of Feminist Philosophy, guest edited with Lynn Hankinson Nelson, 19.1 (2004).
- Special Issues of Philosophy of the Social Sciences: selected papers from the Philosophy of Social Science Roundtable, March issues since 2000 (PoSS 30.1 to 44.2).

Articles and Chapters:

- “Crossing a Threshold: Collaborative Archaeology in Global Dialogue,” Archaeologies 15.5 (2019): 570-587.
- “Representational and Experimental Modeling in Archaeology”: Springer Handbook of Model-based Science, Part I, eds. Magnani and Bertolotti, 2017, pp. 989–1002.
- “What Knowers Know Well: Standpoint Theory and the Formation of Gender Archaeology,” Scientiae Studia 15.1 (2017): 13-38.
- “From the Ground Up: Philosophy and Archaeology,” Proceedings and Addresses of the APA 91 (2017): 118-136.
- “Feminist Philosophy of Social Science”: Routledge Companion to Feminist Philosophy, eds. Garry, Khader, and Stone, 2017, pp. 328–340.
- “How Archaeological Evidence Bites Back: Strategies for Putting Old Data to Work in New Ways”: Science, Technology and Human Values 42.2 (2017): 203-225.
- “A Plurality of Pluralisms: Collaborative Practice in Archaeology”: in Objectivity in Science: New Perspectives from Science and Technology Studies, eds. Padovani, Richardson, and Tsou, Springer, 2015, pp. 189–210.
- “’Do Not Do Unto Others…’: Cultural Misrecognition and the Harms of Appropriation in an Open Source World,” with George Nicholas: in Appropriating the Past, eds. Scarre and Coningham, CUP, 2012, pp. 195-221.
- “Feminist Philosophy of Science: Standpoint Matters,” Proceedings and Addresses of the APA 86.2 (2012): 47-76.
- “Critical Distance: Stabilizing Evidential Claims in Archaeology”: in Evidence, Inference and Enquiry, eds. Dawid, Twining, and Vasilaki, OUP, 2011, pp. 371–394.
- “What Knowers Know Well: Women, Work, and the Academy,” in Feminist Epistemology and Philosophy of Science: Power in Knowledge, ed. Grasswick, Springer, 2011, pp. 157–179.
- “Archaeological Facts in Transit: The ‘Eminent Mounds’ of Central North America”, in How Well do ‘Facts’ Travel?, edita Howlett and Morgan, CUP, 2010, pp. 301–322.
- “Archaeological Finds: Legacies of Appropriation, Modes of Response,” co-authored with George Nicholas, in The Ethics of Cultural Appropriation eds. Young and Brunk, Wiley-Blackwell, 2009, pp. 11–54.
- “Agnotology in/of Archaeology,” Agnotology: The Making and Unmaking of Ignorance, eds. Proctor and Schiebinger, Stanford UP, 2008, pp. 183–205.
- “The Promise and Perils of an Ethic of Stewardship,” Embedding Ethics, eds. Meskell and Pells, Berg, 2005, pp. 47–68.
- “Why Standpoint Matters,” in Science and Other Cultures: Issues in Philosophies of Science and Technology, eds. Figueroa and Harding, Routledge, 2003, pp. 26–48.
- “Doing Social Science as a Feminist: The Engendering of Archaeology,” in Feminism in Twentieth Century Science, Technology, and Medicine, eds. Creager, Lunbeck, and Schiebinger, Chicago UP, 2001, pp. 23–45.
- “Standpoint Matters, in Archaeology for Example,” Primate Encounters: Models of Science, Gender, and Society, eds. Strum and Fedigan, Chicago UP, 2000, pp. 243–260.
- “Questions of Evidence, Legitimacy, and the (Dis)Unity of Science” American Antiquity 65.2 (2000): 227-237.
- “Rethinking Unity as a Working Hypothesis for Philosophy of Science,” Perspectives on Science 7.3 (1999): 293-317.
- “Science, Conservation, and Stewardship: Evolving Codes of Conduct in Archaeology,” Science and Engineering Ethics 5.3 (1999): 319-336.
- “Good Science, Bad Science, or Science as Usual?: Feminist Critiques of Science,” in Women in Human Evolution, ed. Hager, Routledge, 1997, pp. 29–55.
- “The Engendering of Archaeology: Refiguring Feminist Science Studies,” Osiris 12 (1997): 80-99.
- “Ethical Dilemmas in Archaeological Practice: Looting, Repatriation, Stewardship, and the (Trans)formation of Disciplinary Identity,” Perspectives on Science 4.2 (1996): 154-194.
- “The Constitution of Archaeological Evidence: Gender Politics and Science,” in The Disunity of Science: Boundaries, Contexts, and Power, eds. Galison and Stump, Stanford UP, 1996, pp. 311–343.
- “Epistemic Disunity and Political Integrity,” in Making Alternative Histories: The Practice of Archaeology and History in Non-Western Settings, eds. Schmidt and Patterson, SAR Press, 1995, pp. 255–272.
- “Unification and Convergence in Archaeological Explanation: The Agricultural ‘Wave of Advance’ and the Origins of Indo-European Languages,” The Southern Journal of Philosophy 34, Supplement (1995): 1-30.
- "Doing Philosophy as a Feminist: Longino on the Search for a Feminist Epistemology,” Philosophical Topics 23.2 (1995): 345-358.
- “'Invented Lands/Discovered Pasts': The Westward Expansion of Myth and History,” Historical Archaeology 27.4 (1993): 1-19.
- “The Interplay of Evidential Constraints and Political Interests: Recent Archaeological Work on Gender,” American Antiquity 57 (1992): 15-34.
- “Reasoning About Ourselves: Feminist Methodology in the Social Sciences,” in Women and Reason, eds. Harvey and Okruhlik, Michigan UP, 1992, pp. 225–244.
- “Gender Theory and the Archaeological Record,” Engendering Archaeology: Women and Prehistory, eds. Conkey andGero, Blackwell, 1991, pp. 31–54.
- “Archaeological Cables and Tacking: The Implications of Practice for Bernstein's 'Options Beyond Objectivism and Relativism',” Philosophy of the Social Sciences 19 (1989): 1-18.
- “Arguments for Scientific Realism: The Ascending Spiral,” American Philosophical Quarterly 23 (1986): 287-297.
- “The Reaction Against Analogy,” Advances in Archaeological Method and Theory 8 (1985): 63-111.
- “Between Philosophy and Archaeology,” American Antiquity 50 (1985): 478-490.
- “Epistemological Issues Raised by a Structuralist Archaeology,” in Symbolic and Structural Archaeology, ed. Hodder, Cambridge University Press, Cambridge, 1982, pp. 39–46.
