= Nancy Tuana =

American philosopher

- Occupation: Philosopher

Nancy Tuana is an American philosopher who specializes in feminist philosophy, with particular emphasis in philosophy of science, and environmental philosophy. She holds the DuPont/Class of 1949 Professorship in Philosophy and Women's Gender, and Sexuality Studies at The Pennsylvania State University. She came to Penn State from the University of Oregon in 2001 to serve as the founding director of the Rock Ethics Institute. She won the 2022 Victoria Davion Award for her work in environmental philosophy .

== Career ==
The Rock Ethics Institute, under her direction, has taken the lead nationally and internationally in developing innovative and deeply interdisciplinary modes of engaging in socially relevant ethics research through embedding ethical analysis into research in the sciences and engineering and by catalyzing research on ethically responsible policy making. Current research foci include climate change ethics, food ethics, industry sponsorship of research, global ethics, critical philosophy of race, and moral literacy and moral development. While Director, Tuana secured twelve tenure track ethics hires in order to support the Institute's commitment to serve as a catalyst for deeply interdisciplinary ethics research and the infusion of ethics across the Penn State curriculum.

Tuana's scholarly work ranges across the field of feminist philosophy and engages approaches from both Continental and American philosophical traditions. Her scholarly work includes books and articles in feminist history of philosophy, feminist science studies, and feminist epistemology. Her current research foci are twofold. The first is in the field of feminist analyses of anthropocentric climate change in which she has published a number of articles as well as the book Racial Climates, Ecological Indifference: An Ecointersectional Analysis. which focuses on the entanglements of systemic racisms and climate injustice. The second is a focus on corporeal and genealogical temporality, the topic of a recent course at the Collegium Phaenomenologicum she co-taught with Charles Scott which resulted in the co-authored book Beyond Philosophy: Nietzsche, Foucault, Anzaldúa In the field of feminist philosophy, she is committed to approaches that bring together different lineages of liberatory thought including Black feminist theory, Latinx and Latin American feminist theory, decolonial theory, Indigenous feminist theory, queer theory, and disability theory.

She is series editor for Re-Reading the Canon with Penn State Press; the series has over thirty volumes. She also served as co-editor with Laurie Shrage of Hypatia: A Journal of Feminist Philosophy. With Joan Callahan, she created Feminist Philosophers: In Their Own Words. She was the editor for the APA Newsletter on Feminism and Philosophy from its inception until 1992. She has also guest edited special issues of Hypatia on the topics of feminism and science, epistemologies of ignorance, and feminism and climate change. She has also served as guest editor for three special issues of the journal Critical Philosophy of Race. She was Director of two NEH Summer Seminars on Feminist Epistemology, both of which resulted in anthologies, Engendering Rationalities after the first seminar, and Race and Epistemologies of Ignorance and a special issue of Hypatia Feminist Epistemologies of Ignorance. She served as a co-editor of the feminist philosophy topic area for the Stanford Encyclopedia of Philosophy.

Tuana is also committed to engaged philosophy. She has developed expertise in working as a member of scientific teams to address issues of adaptation to climate impacts that are attentive to the values and lifeways of those impacted. She is currently a member of the NSF funded research collaboration, Megalopolitan Coastal Transformation Hub.

== Publications ==
- Tuana, Nancy (1989). Feminism & science. Bloomington: Indiana University Press. ISBN 0-585-18265-5. OCLC 44963578.
- Tuana, Nancy (1992). Woman and the history of philosophy (1st ed.). New York, N.Y.: Paragon House. ISBN 1-55778-194-X. OCLC 23768177.
- Tuana, Nancy (1993). The less noble sex: scientific, religious, and philosophical conceptions of woman's nature. Bloomington: Indiana University Press. ISBN 0-253-36098-6. OCLC 27265899.
- Tuana, Nancy (1994). Feminist interpretations of Plato. University Park, Pa.: Pennsylvania State University Press. ISBN 0-271-01043-6. OCLC 28710786.
- Tuana, Nancy; Rosemarie Tong (1995). Feminism and philosophy: essential readings in theory, reinterpretation, and application. Boulder, Colo.: Westview Press. ISBN 0-8133-2212-X. OCLC 30593806.
- Tuana, Nancy; Sandra Morgen (2001). Engendering rationalities. Albany: State University of New York Press. ISBN 0-7914-5086-4. OCLC 45172008.
- Tuana, Nancy (2002). Revealing male bodies. Bloomington: Indiana University Press. ISBN 0-253-10885-3. OCLC 49852308.
- Tuana, Nancy and Shannon Sullivan (2007) Race and Epistemologies of Ignorance. Albany: State University of New York Press
- Tuana, Nancy; Charles E. Scott (2020). Beyond philosophy : Nietzsche, Foucault, Anzaldúa. Bloomington, Indiana, USA. ISBN 978-0-253-04984-1. OCLC 1156421907.
- Tuana, Nancy (2023) Racial Climates, Ecological Indifference. Oxford: Oxford University Press.
