= Hypatia (journal) =

Peer-reviewed academic journal

- Discipline: Feminist philosophy
- Language: English
- Edited by: Victoria Browne, Katharine Jenkins, Charlotte Knowles, Aidan McGlynn, Aness Kim Webster

Publication details
- History: 1983–present
- Publisher: Cambridge University Press (from 2020)
- Frequency: Quarterly
- Impact factor: 0.712 (2017)

Standard abbreviations
- ISO 4: Hypatia

Indexing
- ISSN: 0887-5367 (print); 1527-2001 (web)
- LCCN: 87655721
- JSTOR: 08875367
- OCLC no.: 243426299

Links
- Journal homepage; Online access (until 2019); Online archive (until 2019); Website

Hypatia: A Journal of Feminist Philosophy is a peer-reviewed academic journal published quarterly by Cambridge University Press. As of July 2025, the journal is led by co-editors Victoria Browne, Katharine Jenkins, Charlotte Knowles, Aidan McGlynn, and Aness Kim Webster. Book reviews are published by Hypatia Reviews Online (HRO). The journal is owned by a non-profit corporation, Hypatia, Inc. The idea for the journal arose out of meetings of the Society for Women in Philosophy (SWIP) in the 1970s. Philosopher and legal scholar Azizah Y. al-Hibri became the founding editor in 1982, when it was published as a "piggy back" issue of the Women's Studies International Forum. In 1984 the Board accepted a proposal by Margaret Simons to launch Hypatia as an autonomous journal, with Simons, who was guest editor of the third (1985) issue of Hypatia at WSIF, as editor. The editorial office at Southern Illinois University Edwardsville handled production as well until Simons, who stepped down as editor in 1990, negotiated a contract with Indiana University Press to publish the journal, facilitating the move to a new editor.

Hypatia became involved in a damaging dispute in 2017 when its associate editors published an unauthorized apology for the journal's publication of an article on transracialism, after the author and article were criticized on social media. The episode pointed to a significant breakdown of communications within Hypatia's editorial team. The journal responded by setting up a task force to restructure its governance. It was the subject of further controversy in 2018 when it accepted a satirical hoax article for publication, one of several written as part of the grievance studies affair. The hoaxes were exposed by The Wall Street Journal before Hypatia was able to publish the article.

== History ==
=== Background ===
Hypatia has its roots in regional meetings of the Society for Women in Philosophy (SWIP), established in 1972. One of SWIP's earliest ideas was that it would set up a philosophy journal. The thought of "a journal of our own" was very powerful, according to Kathryn Morgan (Toronto), speaking in 2009 on the history of Hypatia. At the time, according to Linda Martín Alcoff (CUNY), president of the Hypatia Inc. board of directors since February 2018, philosophers who wanted to write about gender-related issues were being silenced in a discipline "riven by unabashed bias and vested interest, inflicting its own form of unapologetic mob violence".

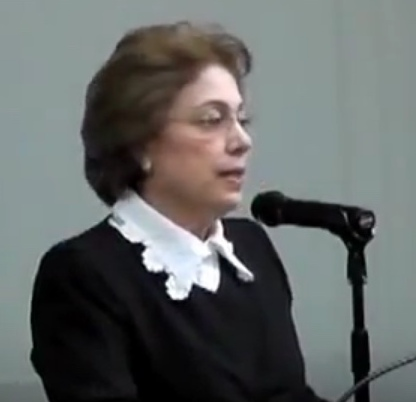
Azizah Y. al-Hibri, 2012

SWIP decided in 1977 to set up an editorial board to plan the journal; the first board was put together by Ann Garry (Cal State LA) and Jacqueline Thomason (UMass Amherst). At a meeting in Denver in the spring of 1979, the board agreed that Azizah Y. al-Hibri (UR) should be the founding editor. Al-Hibri began work on the journal in 1982, after she had completed her PhD in philosophy and just as she was starting her first year of law school. The philosophy and women's studies departments at the University of Pennsylvania offered support in the form of an office and research assistance. Women's Studies International Forum agreed to publish the new journal as an annual "piggy back" issue of its own, which it did for three years, and distributed 10,000 brochures to its mailing list advertising it.

The group led by Al-Hibri decided that submissions would be fully reviewed and that substantive comments would be offered, rather than the usual brief rejection, to help authors improve their work and to contribute to the field's development. Donna Serniak (Penn) was responsible for the first issue. It was first published independently of Women's Studies International Forum in 1986. In 1984 the Board accepted a proposal by Margaret Simons to launch Hypatia as an autonomous journal, with Simons, who was guest editor of the third (1985) issue of Hypatia at WSIF, as Editor. The editorial office at Southern Illinois University Edwardsville would handle production as well. With the enthusiastic support of SWIP members who voted to include journal subscriptions in their membership dues, contributed papers, and guest edited special issues, the new journal was a success. In 1990 Simons stepped down as Editor, after negotiating a contract with Indiana University Press to handle production and subscription fulfillment, thus allowing the editorial office to move easily to another campus.

=== Title, feminist philosophy ===
The journal is named after Hypatia of Alexandria, a mathematician and philosopher who was murdered by a Christian mob in 415 CE. Al-Hibri said that the SWIP editorial board chose the name to reflect that women have "deep roots in philosophy". According to Linda López McAlister (USF), the idea for the name came from Sue Larson (Barnard) during a meeting of Eastern SWIP in 1973. Sandra Harding (UCLA), who was at the meeting, objected, thinking it awful to name a feminist-philosophy journal after a woman who had been "stoned to death for telling the truth". The first suggestion was Hypatia: A Journal of Philosophy and Feminism, rather than A Journal of Feminist Philosophy, because at the time it was unclear what feminist philosophy might be.

In 2019, Hypatia's editors wrote, in "The Promise of Feminist Philosophy":

The journal's editors have often addressed questions of disciplinary pluralism, demographic exclusion and marginalization, and the journal's own role in setting the agenda for feminist agitation or compliance within the academy. ... The special issue structure has sometimes allowed Hypatia to create space for scholars who are subjected to the most persistent forms of marginalization in the discipline, and for intersectional feminist work, even as Hypatia as a whole has been justly criticized for the underrepresentation of such work. ... More recently, the development of Hypatia clusters (a set of two or more articles on a single theme in an open issue) offers another avenue that might be employed to highlight work that is marginalized in the larger discipline. ... We understand Hypatia to be one of those precarious spaces of resistance, where intentions and outcomes do not perfectly mirror each other. We see Hypatia as aspiring to a critical practice that must be vigilantly maintained even as it remains open to radical transformation, as new historical and material conditions present themselves.

== Governance ==
Hypatia is owned by a non-profit corporation, Hypatia Inc., registered in the US state of Washington in April 2008. Its purpose is "to foster feminist scholarship in philosophy and related fields, including through the publication of the academic journal Hypatia". As of 2017, its annual revenue was around $70,000. Besides publishing the journal, Hypatia Inc. also issues "diversity grants" in support of feminist scholarship and philosophy, consisting of travel grants for individuals as well as project grants.

As of October 2019, the board of directors consisted of Linda Martín Alcoff, Talia Mae Bettcher, Ann Garry, Helen Longino, Jacqueline Scott, and Nancy Tuana. In addition, the journal listed an international advisory board of 15 and an 11-strong board of associate editors. Instead of an editor-in-chief, four co-editors were named, Bonnie J. Mann, Erin McKenna, Camisha Russell, and Rocío Zambrana, and a managing editor, Sarah LaChance Adams. The managing editor of Hypatia Reviews Online was named as Bjørn Kristensen. Previous editors-in-chief were:

- Azizah al-Hibri (1982–1984)
- Margaret Simons (1984–1990)
- Linda López McAlister (1990–1998), with Cheryl Hall and Joanne Waugh (1995–1998)
- Laurie J. Shrage and Nancy Tuana (1998–2003)
- Hilde Lindemann (2003–2008)
- Lori Gruen (2008–2010) and Alison Wylie (2008–2013)
- Linda Martín Alcoff and Ann Cudd (2010–2013)
- Sally Scholz (2013–2017)
- Ann Garry (interim editor, 2018–2019)

== 2017 transracialism controversy ==
=== Dispute ===
Hypatia became involved in a dispute in April 2017 that led to the online shaming of one of its authors, Rebecca Tuvel, an untenured assistant professor of philosophy at Rhodes College in Memphis. The episode pointed to a breakdown of communications within Hypatia's editorial team, and to a rift within feminism and academic philosophy.

The journal had published Tuvel's article, "In Defense of Transracialism", in its spring 2017 edition after the standard double-blind peer review. Comparing the case of Caitlyn Jenner to that of Rachel Dolezal, Tuvel argued that "[s]ince we should accept transgender individuals' decisions to change sexes, we should also accept transracial individuals' decisions to change races." On 28 April the article was criticized on Facebook and Twitter, and Tuvel became the target of personal attacks. The following day an open letter, listing a member of Hypatia's editorial board as its point of contact, urged that the article be retracted. By 2 May the letter had gathered 830 signatures. The journal distanced itself further from the article on 1 May when an Hypatia associate editor apologized on the journal's Facebook page for the article's publication, on behalf of "a majority of the Hypatia's Board of Associated Editors". (Note: At the time of the dispute in April–May 2017, the 10 associate editors were Linda Martín Alcoff (CUNY), Ann Cahill (Elon); Kim Hall (Appalachian); Cressida Heyes (Alberta); Karen Jones (Melbourne); Kyoo Lee (John Jay); Mariana Ortega (John Carroll); Ásta Kristjana Sveinsdóttir (SFSU); Alison Wylie (Washington); and George Yancy (Emory).) The editor-in-chief, Sally Scholz, stood by the article, and the board of directors, led by Miriam Solomon, confirmed that it would not be retracted.

=== Task force ===
In July 2017 Scholz resigned as editor-in-chief, along with Shelley Wilcox, editor of Hypatia Reviews Online. The board of directors announced that a task force would restructure the journal's governance, and that anyone in an editorial or non-board position with Hypatia would be "required to sign a statement of adherence to guidelines issued by COPE, the Committee on Publication Ethics". According to a statement from the associate editors, whose role was to choose the next editor, the board of directors asked them, on 17 July, to resign or the journal's governance documents would be suspended, which would remove the associate editors' influence. Eight of the associate editors resigned. In their resignation statement, they wrote that the current controversy was "grounded in long-standing differences and tensions within the field." They argued that feminist philosophy had an ethical commitment to transform philosophy into "a discipline that honors the perspectives and welcomes the scholarly contributions of historically marginalized groups, including people of color, trans* people, disabled people, and queer people."

The board appointed interim editors, and in November 2017 Sally Haslanger, Serene Khader, and Yannik Thiem were named as the governance task-force co-chairs. The five-person board of directors, including Solomon, was replaced in February 2018. Linda Martín Alcoff and Kim Hall, two of the associate editors who resigned in July, became president of the board of directors and chair of the search committee for the new editorial team, respectively.

== 2018 grievance studies affair ==
Hypatia was the subject of further controversy in 2018 when it accepted a hoax article for publication as part of the "grievance studies affair". The philosopher Peter Boghossian and others submitted 20 bogus papers to several humanities and social-sciences journals to provoke discussion about scholarly standards. Two papers were submitted to Hypatia.

The first, "The Progressive Stack: An Intersectional Feminist Approach to Pedagogy", was not accepted; the authors were three times advised to revise and resubmit. The paper suggested that "educators should discriminate by identity and calculate their students' status in terms of privilege, favor the least privileged with more time, attention and positive feedback and penalize the most privileged by declining to hear their contributions, deriding their input, intentionally speaking over them, and making them sit on the floor in chains ..." One reviewer asked how privileged students could be made to "feel genuinely uncomfortable in ways that are humbling and productive", but not "so uncomfortable (shame) that they resist with renewed vigor". The second paper, "When the Joke Is on You: A Feminist Perspective on How Positionality Influences Satire", was accepted. The paper argued that "satirical or ironic critique of social justice scholarship" is unethical but is acceptable in fields such as economics. The Wall Street Journal exposed the hoax before Hypatia had published the article.

In October 2018, Hypatia published a statement denouncing the breakdown of trust in academic publishing, and said it would "revisit our procedures to see whether we can better screen for fraud in ways that will burden neither the very authors we hope to encourage to submit their work nor the reviewers we ask to give their time to their important task". The editors emphasized that the hoaxers had manipulated Hypatia's publication and review practices, which were intended to "encourage submissions by younger and marginalized scholars" and "to avoid placing unnecessary hurdles in the way of submitting and revising manuscripts". Justin Weinberg, Associate Professor at the University of South Carolina, wrote that "if the citations [in the published paper] are legitimate and the descriptions of others' views are accurate ... the editors of Hypatia have nothing to be particularly ashamed of. ... It seems to me that only on the last page of the paper are there certain statements that could be interpreted as outrageous, but they are so vague that a much more charitable alternative interpretation would be reasonable."

== Revised governance structure ==
Following the 2018 transition, the governing bodies of Hypatia collaborated to produce a new governance document to facilitate open communication and procedural consistency in cases of conflict. The journal also now has two standing committees to consider issues of ethics, dispute resolution, and outreach. In February 2020, Hypatia's governance boards elected a new Board of Associate Editors.

== Abstracting and indexing ==
Hypatia is abstracted and indexed in the following bibliographic databases:

- Arts and Humanities Citation Index
- Current Contents/Arts & Humanities
- Current Contents/Social & Behavioral Sciences
- EBSCO databases
- International Bibliography of Periodical Literature
- International Political Science Abstracts
- MLA International Bibliography
- Philosopher's Index
- PhilPapers
- ProQuest databases
- Scopus
- Social Sciences Citation Index
- Sociological Abstracts

According to the Journal Citation Reports, the journal has a 2017 impact factor of 0.712.

== See also ==
- List of women's studies journals
