= Hans Huchzermeyer =

German doctor and musicologist

Hans Huchzermeyer (born 26 September 1939) is a German doctor and musicologist.

== Formation and work ==
Huchzermeyer was born in Osnabrück as the son of the classical philologist, musicologist and composer Helmut Huchzermeyer (1904-1984) and his wife Charlotte, née Rüther (1915-1993). After passing his Abitur in 1959 at the Stiftisches Humanistisches Gymnasium Mönchengladbach, he studied medicine in Tübingen, Vienna, Berlin and Münster. After a period as a medical assistant and theoretical training at the Pathology and Diabetes Research Institute (biochemistry) at the Heinrich Heine University Düsseldorf, he continued his clinical training in internal medicine at the Hannover Medical School from 1971. In 1975, he was recognised as a doctor of internal medicine and gastroenterology, in 1976 as a clinical senior physician, in 1977 as a postdoctoral lecturer and Venia legendi for internal medicine, and in 1982 as a full professor of internal medicine.

From 1983 to 2004, Huchzermeyer was head of the Medical Clinic at the Klinikum in Minden/Westf. He has been a member of the teaching staff of the Hannover Medical School since 1977, and from 1983 to 2004 he was also a lecturer for internal medicine at the University of Münster.

Much of his scientific work focusses on diseases of the gastro-intestinal tract, the liver, problems of metabolism and nutrition. He studiedenzyme diagnostics of liver and bile duct diseases and the further development of endoscopic procedures in adults and children. Using morphological methods, he studied progressive myoclonus epilepsy (lafora disease), an autosomal recessive disease with deposition of polyglucosan in cells of various organs. For the first time, he detected the storage material in myocardium and liver by electron-optical methods. Using biochemical methods, he contributed to the characterisation of the New Zealand obese mouse, showing analogies to the human metabolic syndrome and type 2 diabetes in this polygenic model. Internal diseases during pregnancy is a further focus of his work, about which he has published He is the author or co-author of over 300 scientific journal and book articles and has written or edited nine monographs.

After his retirement, Huchzermeyer studied musicology at the Faculty of Cultural Studies at the University of Paderborn receiving a : Magister Artium 2008, doctorate in Musicology 2011. His main focus is the History of Protestant church music of East Prussia from 1800 to 1945, equalisation of Protestant church music and elimination of Jewish-Christian church musicians from their posts during the Nazi era, music and cultural history of Berlin and Pomerania in the 19th century, local music and cultural history of the Westphalian-Lower Saxony region.

== Publications (author, co-author, editor) ==
=== Medicine ===
- Huchzermeyer, Hans: Zur Histologie und Elektronenmikroskopie der Myoklonuskörperkrankheit, Düsseldorf 1969
- Schmitz-Feuerhake, Inge, Hellmut Fröhlich und Hans Huchzermeyer: Atraumatische Durchblutungsmessungen mit radioaktiven Edelgasen. Physikalische Grundlagen und Anwendung der Inhalationsmethode bei Gehirn, Leber, Milz und Nieren, Bern-Stuttgart-Vienna 1976, ISBN 3-456-80225-0
- Huchzermeyer, Hans: Leber und Schwangerschaft, Bern-Stuttgart-Wien 1978, ISBN 3-456-80403-2
- Burdelski, Martin und Hans Huchzermeyer: Gastrointestinale Endoskopie im Kindesalter, Berlin-Heidelberg-New York 1981, ISBN 3-540-10220-5
- Huchzermeyer, Hans (ed.): Internistische Erkrankungen und Schwangerschaft, Stuttgart, vol. 1 1986, ISBN 3-17-009043-7 // vol. 2 1987, ISBN 3-17-009045-3
- Huchzermeyer, Hans (ed.): Chronisch-entzündliche Darmerkrankungen, Munich 1986, ISBN 3-87185-122-1
- Huchzermeyer, Hans and Hans Lippert (ed.): Gastroenterologie und Viszeralchirurgie, Walsrode 1996, ISBN 3-00-000096-8
- Huchzermeyer, Hans (ed.): Erbrechen. Ein interdisziplinäres Problem, Stuttgart-New York 1997, ISBN 3-13-102091-1
- Huchzermeyer, Hans and Hans Lippert (ed.): Infektionsmedizin in Gastroenterologie und Viszeralchirurgie. Aktuelle Probleme und Lösungen für die Praxis, Stuttgart-New York 2000, ISBN 3-7945-1948-5
- Huchzermeyer, Hans and Arno J. Dormann: Pharmakotherapie internistischer Erkrankungen während der Schwangerschaft, in Arzneimitteltherapie in der Frauenheilkunde (edited by K. Friese and F. Melchert), Stuttgart 2002: 95–171
- Huchzermeyer, Hans: Erkrankungen der Leber, pp. 118–134 – Erkrankungen des Magen-Darm-Traktes, pp. 149–167, in Erkrankungen in der Schwangerschaft (edited by W. Rath and K. Friese), Stuttgart-New York 2005
- Huchzermeyer, Hans: Schwangerschaft bei Erkrankungen der Leber und Gallenwege. Gastro-Liga e. V., Ratgeber für Patienten.
- Huchzermeyer, Hans: Schwangerschaft bei Erkrankungen des Magen-Darm-Kanals und der Bauchspeicheldrüse. Gastro-Liga e. V., Ratgeber für Patienten
- Huchzermeyer, Hans: Erkrankungen von Leber, Gallenwegen, Pankreas und Magen-Darm-Trakt in der Schwangerschaft, Minden 2008, ISBN 978-3-00-023075-2

=== Music and cultural studies ===
- Huchzermeyer, Helmut und Huchzermeyer, Hans: Die Bedeutung des Rhythmus in der Musiktherapie der Griechen von der Frühzeit bis zum Beginn des Hellenismus. In Sudhoffs Archiv. Zeitschrift für Wissenschaftsgeschichte 58, 1974: 113–148
- Huchzermeyer, Helmut: Musikalische Werke. Altgriechische Musik (hg. von Hans Huchzermeyer), Minden 2000, ISBN 3-00-005972-5
- Huchzermeyer, Hans: Franz Hofmann (1920–1945). Ein unbekannter fränkischer Komponist. In Mitteilungen des Vereins für Geschichte der Stadt Nürnberg, 95. vol., Nürnberg 2008: 317–346
- Huchzermeyer, Hans: Gleichschaltung der evangelischen Kirchenmusik während der NS-Diktatur. Anmerkungen zu Leben und Werk des nichtarischen Kirchenmusikers Julio Goslar (1883–1976) aus Köln. In Arbeitsgemeinschaft für rheinische Musikgeschichte. Mitteilungen 93, September 2011: 8–28
- Huchzermeyer, Hans: Studien zur Musik- und Kulturgeschichte Berlins, Pommerns und Ostpreußens im 19. und frühen 20. Jahrhundert. Franz W. Ressel: Violinist in Berlin – Rohloff-Familie: Lehrerorganisten in Pommern – Ernst Maschke: Kirchenmusiker in Königsberg/Preußen – Maschke-Latte: Porträt einer jüdisch-christlichen Königsberger Familie, Minden 2013, ISBN 978-3-00-041716-0
- Huchzermeyer, Hans: Zur Geschichte der evangelischen Kirchenmusik in Königsberg/Preußen (1800–1945). Die kirchenmusikalischen Ausbildungsstätten. Minden 2013, ISBN 978-3-00-041717-7
- Huchzermeyer, Hans: Personenartikel zu: Altmann, Arthur (1873-?); Glassner, Evaristos (1912–1988); Goslar, Julio (1883–1976); Hildebrand, Karl (1889–1975); Katz, Rosalie (1892–1968); Leupold, Ulrich (1909–1970); Lewin, Otto (1894–1942); Maschke, Ernst (1867–1940), in the Lexikon verfolgter Musiker und Musikerinnen der NS-Zeit. Claudia Maurer Zenck and Peter Petersen (ed.) with the collaboration of Sophie Fetthauer, Hamburg since 2005
- Huchzermeyer, Hans: "Judenreine" Kirchenmusik. Elimination der "nichtarischen" evangelischen Kirchenmusiker aus Reichsmusikkammer und Kirchendienst im Dritten Reich. In Jahrbuch Preußenland 5, 2014: 147–185
- Huchzermeyer, Hans: Die "Schachtafelen der Gesuntheyt" des Michael Herr, Straßburg 1533. Anmerkungen zu den Buchillustrationen, zur Bedeutung der Musik und zum Begriff Schachtafel. URL: http://www.huchzen-verlag.de
- Huchzermeyer, Hans: Sechs Komponisten der ersten Hälfte des 20. Jahrhunderts im Portrait. Wilhelm Meyer-Stolzenau – Theodor Meyer-Steineg – Günter Plappert – Franz Hofmann – Willy Mewes – Helmut Huchzermeyer, Minden 2017, ISBN 978-3-00-053511-6
- Huchzermeyer, Hans: Problems in improving musical education in German grammar schools (Gymnasium). A letter, dated September 8, 1926, from Leo Kestenberg to the Berlin music teacher and composer Ernst Franz Rohloff (1884-1947), in Music Education in the Focus of Historical Concepts and New Horizons (Eds. F. Brusniak, Z. Buzás, N. A. Marshall, D. Sagrillo), pp. 51–57, Kecskemét 2018
- Huchzermeyer, Hans: Personenartikel, in Biographisch-Bibliographisches Kirchenlexikon, Bautz, Hamm 1975 ff.; Altmann, Arthur (1873-1941/45), vol. XXXIX (2018) Sp. 6-10; Glassner, Evaristos (1912-1988), vol. XXXIX (2018) Sp. 449-502; Huchzermeyer, Helmut (1904-1984), vol. XXXIX (2018) Sp. 612-622; Leupold, Lorenz Siegfried Ulrich (1909-1970), vol. XXXIX (2018) Sp. 768-774; Maschke, Ernst (1867-1940), vol. XXXIX (2018) Sp. 863-876; Volckmar, Wilhelm (1812-1887), vol. XL (2019) Sp.1454-1466; Althaus, Friedrich Georg (1790-1863), vol. XLII (2021) Sp. i. Vorb.; Zeiss, Adam Georgon (1779-1870), vol. XLII (2021) Sp. i. Vorb.; Zeiss, Wilhelm Heinrich Nicolaus (1804-1887), vol. XLII (2021) Sp. i. Vorb.
- Huchzermeyer, Hans: Adam Valentin Vol(c)kmar (1770-1851). Organist an der Stadtkirche St. Nikolai, Gesanglehrer am Kurfürstlichen Gymnasium und Komponist in Rinteln, in: Schaumburgische Mitteilungen 2 (2019), 266-295
- Huchzermeyer, Hans: Adam Valentin Vol(c)kmar (1770-1851). Organist, Lehrer und Komponist in Rinteln. Ein Beitrag zur hessischen Musikgeschichte in der ersten Hälfte des 19. Jahrhunderts, in: Hessisches Jahrbuch für Landesgeschichte 69 (2019), 141-168
