= Deutsche Gesellschaft für Philosophie =

Philosophers' organization in Germany

- Abbreviation: DGPhil
- Formation: 1947
- Type: Learned Society
- Purpose: Promoting philosophy in schools and universities
- Location: Germany
- Origins: 1947-present
- President: Ruth Hagengruber
- Vice President: Gerald Hartung
- Treasurer: Christian Barth
- Publication: Deutsches Jahrbuch Philosophie
- Website: https://www.dgphil.de/

The German Society for Philosophy (German: Deutsche Gesellschaft für Philosophie; DGPhil), formerly known as the General German Society for Philosophy (German: Allgemeine Gesellschaft für Philosophie in Deutschland), is an association of philosophers researching and teaching at universities and schools in German-speaking countries as well as all those who wish to participate in German philosophical intellectual life.

The scholarly activities of the society is documented by the Deutsches Jahrbuch Philosophy.

== History ==
The founding initiative came from Georgi Schischkoff at the First German Philosophers' Congress in Garmisch-Partenkirchen in 1947. It led to the founding of the "General Society for Philosophy in Germany e. V." in 1950. On September 25, 2002, the General Assembly of Members passed a resolution to change the name to the "German Society for Philosophy e. V.". The Society is based in Leipzig; the office is located in Jena.

== Goals and tasks ==
The statutory objectives are to interest wide circles in philosophical work and to allow them to participate in its results, to represent the interests of philosophy at universities and schools and to promote the exchange of scientific results in philosophy through an annual forum for philosophy and the Deutscher Kongress für Philosophie (German Congress of Philosophy) which takes place every three years. The tasks of the DGPhil also include representing German philosophers in the Fédération Internationale des Sociétés de Philosophie (FISP) and strengthening cooperation with national organizations abroad.

== Organization ==
The association is managed by a board consisting of the president, managing director and treasurer. An extended board, which is intended to represent the various fields of work and approaches in philosophy, advises the board. The General Assembly usually meets every three years on the occasion of the German Congresses of Philosophy. It elects the Executive Board and is responsible for amending the statutes.

== Communication ==
The society publishes a free digital quarterly journal (Mitteilungen der Deutschen Gesellschaft für Philosophie) four times a year and operates a website at www.dgphil.de, which includes an overview of all philosophy degree programs in the German-speaking world and a comprehensive calendar of events. Members are notified of events and calls for papers by e-mail and also receive relevant job advertisements in the same way.

== Presidents ==
- 1947: Paul Menzer President of the I German Philosophers' Congress in Garmisch-Partenkirchen
- 1948: Fritz-Joachim von Rintelen President of the II German Philosophers' Congress in Mainz
- 1950: Helmuth Plessner President of the III German Philosophers' Congress in Bremen, where he was elected the first President of the General Society of Philosophy in Germany, which was founded at this congress.
- 1957–1962: Helmut Kuhn
- 1962–1968: Hans-Georg Gadamer
- 1969–1975: Kurt Hübner
- 1975–1978: Hermann Lübbe
- 1978–1984: Wolfgang Kluxen
- 1984–1987: Odo Marquard
- 1988–1990: Herbert Schnädelbach
- 1990–1993: Hans Lenk
- 1994–1996: Hans Poser
- 1997–1999: Jürgen Mittelstraß
- 1999–2002: Wolfram Hogrebe
- 2003–2005: Günter Abel
- 2006–2008: Carl Friedrich Gethmann
- 2009–2011: Julian Nida-Rümelin
- 2012–2014: Michael Quante
- 2015–2017: Dominik Perler
- 2018–2021: Gerhard Ernst
- 2022–2025: Reinold Schmücker
- since 2025: Ruth Hagengruber

== Corporate members (professional associations) of the DGPhil ==
- Argentinisch-Deutsche Gesellschaft für Philosophie
- Chilenisch-Deutsche Gesellschaft für Philosophie
- Deutsche Gesellschaft für Ästhetik
- Deutsche Gesellschaft für französischsprachige Philosophie (DGFP)
- Deutsch-Polnische Gesellschaft für Philosophie
- Deutsch-Ungarische Gesellschaft für Philosophie
- Europäische Gesellschaft für frühneuzeitliche Philosophie (ESEMP)
- Fachverband Ethik
- Fachverband Philosophie
- Gesellschaft für antike Philosophie
- Gesellschaft für Interkulturelle Philosophie
- Gesellschaft für Philosophie des Mittelalters und der Renaissance
- Internationale Assoziation von Philosophinnen
- Internationale Ludwig-Wittgenstein-Gesellschaft
- Internationale Schelling Gesellschaft
- Kant-Gesellschaft
- Max Scheler Gesellschaft
- Philosophische Gesellschaft in Bremen
- Schopenhauer-Gesellschaft
- Spinoza-Gesellschaft
- Zeitschrift für philosophische Forschung

== See also ==
- Société française de philosophie

== Literature ==
- Wolfram Hogrebe, Volker Böhnigk, Kati Müller (Hrsg.): Materialien zur Geschichte der allgemeinen Gesellschaft für Philosophie in Deutschland e. V. (1950–2002). Sinclair Press, Bonn 2002, ISBN 3-9806762-3-4.
