= Huchzermeyer =

Huchzermeyer is a German surname. It is derived from the place name Huchzen, which is a settlement in Niedersachsen, today part of the municipality of Hüllhorst, and the Middle High German word meier, meaning "manager (of a lord's country estate)".

== Notable people with the surname ==
- Hans Huchzermeyer (born 1939), German doctor and musicologist
- Helmut Huchzermeyer (1904–1984), German philologist, musicologist and composer
- Marie Huchzermeyer, academic and university professor

== See also ==
- Meyer (surname)
