= Brigitte Schiffer =

German musical artist (1909–1986)

- Born: 14 July 1909; Berlin, German Reich
- Died: 18 January 1986 (aged 76); London, United Kingdom
- Occupations: Composer; Ethnomusicologist; Music critic; Music educator
- Years active: 1935-1960s
- Works: String Quartet
- Spouse: Hans Hickmann (married 1935–1938)

Brigitte Schiffer (14 July 1909 – 18 January 1986) was a German composer, ethnomusicologist, music educator and music critic. After having left Berlin in 1935 due to Nazi Germany's antisemitic laws, she lived in Egypt for almost 30 years. In Cairo, she taught as professor and head of the music department at the former Cairo Institute for the Education of Girls. She also worked for the Cairo Conservatory of Music and Egyptian radio broadcasts.

Her own compositions include a string quartet inspired by her ethnomusicological research of traditional music at the Siwa Oasis. In the 21st-century, her work and field recordings for the Berlin Phonogramm-Archive have been discussed as examples of transcultural research on colonial sound archives.

== Life and career ==
=== Early life and education ===
Schiffer was the daughter of merchant Erwin Edwin Schiffer and his wife Anni, née Katz, both of German-Jewish origin. After the death of her father in 1913, her mother married Swiss businessman Kurt Oelsner, who later adopted her. She spent her childhood and youth together with her family in Berlin, Davos, Lausanne and Freiburg im Breisgau. After the family had moved to Egypt on account of the stepfather’s business, they lived from 1923 in Alexandria, where she took the French high school diploma in 1929.

During this time, she received private piano lessons and lessons in music theory. In 1930, she began to study composition with Heinz Tiessen at the Berlin University of the Arts and also studied philosophy, musicology and ethnology at the Humboldt University of Berlin from 1931. Her teachers included Curt Sachs, Erich von Hornbostel and Arnold Schering.

In 1932, Schiffer attended the first congress of Arab music in Cairo and became acquainted with Arab and European composers, musicologists and musicians. In 1932 and 1933, she undertook two research trips to the Egyptian oasis of Siwa on behalf of the Berlin Phonogramm Archive – part of it together with the ethnomusicologist Hans Hickmann. They collected music from the Siwa oasis on wax cylinder recordings, that are now part of the Phonogramm archive.

After the Nazi Party seized power in Germany, Schiffer was briefly exmatriculated from the university because of her Jewish origins. Through the support of Arnold Schering, she was able to continue her studies. In 1935 she finished her PhD in ethnomusicology with a thesis called Die Oase Siwa und ihre Musik (The Siwa oasis and its music). Due to reprisals by the National Socialist administration, she dropped her composition studies in 1935.

=== Second stay in Egypt ===
In September 1935, Schiffer returned to Egypt with her parents and Hans Hickmann. Their wedding took place in Nicosia, Cyprus, because the German consulate in Cairo had refused to register a German-Jewish “mixed marriage”. In 1938, the couple separated – according to Schiffer and Hickmann in the wake of a forced divorce by the People’s Court in Nazi Germany.

Schiffer worked as professor of music at the Cairo Institute for the Education of Girls (later Department of Music Education at Helwan University) from 1937 to 1959 and became head of the institute’s music department. During the war-related interruption of her teaching activity from 1943 to 1945, she worked for the British army, translating German radio broadcasts. In addition to her teaching at the institute, she was a music lecturer at the Egyptian Ministry of Education from 1951 to 1953. As a lecturer, she also worked from 1959 to 1963 at the newly founded Cairo Conservatory of Music and wrote contributions for Egyptian radio broadcasts.

=== Return to Europe ===
After the war, Sciffer again made several trips to Europe. In 1950 she gave a lecture on “The musical life of Egypt” at the Darmstädter Ferienkurse and became a regular participant and rapporteur. For the damage the Nazi regime had done to her career, she sued the West German government and was awarded a compensation ("Wiedergutmachung") in 1960.

In 1963 Schiffer moved to London with the antique dealer Oswald Burchard (1909–1998), who was her partner until her death. From London, she wrote as a music critic for musical events for over two decades, travelling to festivals in Europe. She was a correspondent of British, German and Swiss daily newspapers and music magazines, including the The World of Music, Melos and Neue Zeitschrift für Musik.

Schiffer maintained a long-lasting correspondence with personalities such as Hans Heinz Stuckenschmidt, Carla Henius, Wladimir Vogel, Hermann Scherchen and their composition teacher Heinz Tiessen. Further, her correspondence with Leo Kestenberg, Alfred Schlee, Luigi Dallapiccola, Pierre Boulez sowie Paul Hindemith’s wife Gertrud has been collected in various archives. She also held regular meetings in her house, inviting intellectuals and artists from Egypt and abroad. Among others, photographer Ida Kar and the writer Jean Moscatelli, who were part of Egypt's surrealist movement, are mentioned in her guest book.

== Compositions ==
During her study of composition in Berlin in the 1930s, Schiffer wrote her String Quartet in three movements. It could only be performed in a private setting due to general discrimination of Jewish people, in particular by the antisemitic director of the university Fritz Stein. In Egypt, she created works that were performed in Cairo and Alexandria. With her String Quartet, she won the Concours Betsy Stross in 1943. One of the judges at this competition was Leo Kestenberg, with whom she entertained a long-standing friendship.

In 2014, her string quartet Quatuor a Cordes was performed at the Konzerthaus Berlin and broadcast on German public broadcaster Deutschlandfunk. It was published the same year along with compositions by Leo Bütow, Richard Engelbrecht and Wolf Rosenberg.

Many of Schiffer’s works have not been preserved, and there is no complete catalogue of works. In the correspondence with Heinz Tiessen, several works were mentioned, which she had either composed or planned, including choral works and works for keyboard instruments.

== Selected works ==
=== Publications ===
- Die Oase Siwa und ihre Musik. PhD thesis. Druckerei Wilhelm Postberg, Bottrop 1936. (in German)
- Le mirage de l’Orient dans la Musique Européenne. In: Revue des Conférences Françaises en orient. 1945, pp. 412–415. (in French)
- Neue griechische Musik. In: Orbis musicae: Studies in musicology 1, 2, 1972, pp. 193–201.
- Die Folgen der Kulturrevolution. Interview with Alexander Goehr about his teachings in China. In: Neue Zeitschrift für Musik. 142, 2, 1981, pp. 155–157.

=== Compositions ===
- Quatuor a Cordes (I Allegro deciso, II Andante. Sur un thême de l’oasis de Siwa, III Allegro con spirito), 1934
- Trauermusik (Lamentation) for movement choir and orchestra in 3 parts, 1932
- Concerto Grosso for piano (or harpsichord), flute (or violin), cello solo and orchestra, 1936
- Four fables by Lafontaine for three-part madrigal choir; piano ad libitum
- Missa brevis for two voices, two instruments and percussion

== Reception ==
Musicologist Matthias Pasdzierny from the Academy of Arts in Berlin has published several articles based on his research of Schiffer's life and work. In particular, he wrote her biographcal entry for the Lexikon verfolgter Musiker und Musikerinnen der NS-Zeit. As member of the Arab-German Young Academy of Scienes and Humanities, he contributed to the translation of her letters in Arabic, titled Brigitte Schiffer: Letters from Cosmopolitan Cairo. Pasdzierny also has published on Schiffer's life and work as part of the history of German ethnomusicology before 1933 and in the context of the German culture of remembrance (Erinnerungskultur). In September 2026, he participated in a public event at the Humboldt Forum, taking Schiffer's wax cylinder recordings in Egypt as an example of "colonial sound archives [and] the challenges of transcultural research."

Schiffer’s works and correspondence are preserved in the archives of the Academy of Arts Berlin (Hermann-Scherchen-Archiv), the Humboldt University of Berlin and the Central Library of Zurich, the Archive of Israeli Music of the University of Tel Aviv, and the National Library of Israel (Brigitte Schiffer Archive; Sign.: Mus 59), as well as in the archive of the publisher Universal Edition.
