= The Cambridge History of Moral Philosophy =

2017 book edited by Sacha Golob and Jens Timmermann

- First edition
- Author: Sacha Golob and Jens Timmermann (editors)
- Language: English
- Subject: Moral philosophy
- Publisher: Cambridge University Press
- Publication date: 2017
- Media type: Print (hardcover)
- Pages: 751
- ISBN: 978-1-107-03305-4

The Cambridge History of Moral Philosophy is a 2017 book edited by Sacha Golob and Jens Timmermann in which the authors provide an account of the history of moral philosophy in the Western tradition.

== Reception ==
The book was reviewed by T. H. Irwin and Jonathan Head (from Keele University). Irwin calls it a "valuable companion", but he mentions some flaws and shortcomings and points out that it deserves a second enlarged edition.

== Essays ==
	Title	Author
1	Ethics before Socrates	Catherine Rowett
2	Socrates and Sophists	Alex Long
3	Plato	James Warren
4	Aristotle	Michael Pakaluk
5	Epicureanism and Hedonism	Voula Tsouna
6	Stoicism	Brad Inwood
7	Ancient Skepticism	Katja Maria Vogt
8	Neo-Platonism	Alexandrine Schniewind
9	Early Christian Ethics	Sarah Byers
10	Boethius, Abelard and Anselm	John Marenbon
11	Medieval Jewish Ethics	Tamar Rudavsky
12	Moral Philosophy in the Medieval Islamicate World	Anna Akasoy
13	“Christian Aristotelianism”? Albert the Great and Thomas Aquinas	Tobias Hoffmann, Jörn Müller
14	Duns Scotus and William of Ockham	Tobias Hoffmann
15	Humanism	Sabrina Ebbersmeyer
16	Descartes’s Provisional Morality	Lisa Shapiro
17	Hobbes	S.A. Lloyd
18	The Cambridge Platonists	Sarah Hutton
19	Bayle	Jean-Luc Solère
20	Leibniz	Gregory Brown
21	Spinoza	Steven Nadler
22	Pascal	Desmond M. Clarke
23	Locke and Butler	Stephen Darwall
24	Shaftesbury, Hutcheson and the Moral Sense	James A. Harris
25	Hume	Paul Guyer
26	Smith and Bentham	Craig Smith
27	Rousseau	Susan Meld Shell
28	Rationalism and Perfectionism	Stefano Bacin
29	Kant	Jens Timmermann
30	Fichte	Allen Wood
31	Hegel	Dudley Knowles
32	Mill	Christopher Macleod
33	Schopenhauer	Alistair Welchman
34	Kierkegaard	R. Zachary Manis
35	American Transcendentalism	Russell B. Goodman
36	Nietzsche	Lawrence Hatab
37	Marxism	Jeffrey Reiman
38	Sidgwick	Katarzyna de Lazari-Radek
39	Pragmatism	Cheryl Misak
40	British Idealism	Robert Stern
41	Ethical Intuitionism	Philip Stratton-Lake
42	Husserl and Phenomenological Ethics	Nicolas de Warren
43	Ethics in Freudian and Post-Freudian Psychoanalysis	Edward Harcourt
44	Noncognitivism: From the Vienna Circle to the Present Day	John Eriksson
45	The Frankfurt School	Fred Rush
46	Heidegger	Sacha Golob
47	Sartre	Sebastian Gardner
48	French Ethical Philosophy since the 1960s	Todd May
49	Wittgenstein’s Ethics and Wittgensteinian Moral Philosophy	David Levy
50	Anti-Theory: Anscombe, Foot and Williams	Simon Robertson
51	Discourse Ethics	Peter Niesen
52	Decision Theory	Ben Eggleston
53	Rawls	Katrin Flikschuh
