= Center for the History of Women Philosophers and Scientists =

Research center

The Center for the History of Women Philosophers and Scientists (HWPS) is an interdisciplinary research center at the University of Paderborn, focused on the work of historical women philosophers and scientists. The Center is responsible for the publication of the Journal of the History of Women Philosophers and Scientists. The Center also awards the annual Elizabeth of Bohemia prize, Europe's first prize honoring women philosophers. The Center received a major grant from the Alexander von Humboldt foundation for the study of women philosophers in Ukraine, and also maintains a research network and talk series for researchers working on the history of women philosophers and scientists.

== Encyclopedia of Concise Concepts by Women Philosophers ==
The Encyclopedia of Concise Concepts by Women Philosophers (ECC) is an online encyclopedia that exclusively contains entries on concepts from the work of female philosophers.

The ECC is an open access database developed by the Center for the History of Women Philosophers and Scientists that went online on June 15, 2018.

Each entry is written by an internationally recognized researcher and peer-reviewed before publication. It will contain a brief explanation of a philosophical concept both either developed or significantly advanced by a woman philosopher as well as a list of primary and secondary sources for further research. Early articles focused on thinkers such as Diotima of Mantinea, Mercy Otis Warren and Jane Addams.

The encyclopedia is part of the digital collection of Paderborn University and articles are available as official academic sources. It was created by the German philosopher Ruth Hagengruber and Mary Ellen Waithe of Cleveland State University.

The ECC received the DARIAH-DE DH-Award 2018, (“Tools and Projects” section), for exceptional work in digital humanities.

== Émilie Du Châtelet: Research and Manuscript Editions ==
The Center has a long-standing focus on the work of the eighteenth-century philosopher and physicist, Émilie du Châtelet. For example, a major international conference in Potsdam in 2006 resulted in an edited volume linking Du Châtelet to Leibniz and Newton. Since 2020, the Center has published a freely available historical-critical online edition of previously unedited manuscripts by Du Châtelet, stored at the National Library in St. Petersburg, Russia. This is the first critical edition, as well as the first online edition, of manuscripts by Du Châtelet. The edition is funded by the German Research Foundation (Deutsche Forschungsgemeinschaft) and is a collaboration with the National Library of Russia.

Since 2021, the Center has also published a freely available online historical-critical edition of a different set of manuscripts by Du Châtelet, stored at the Bibliothèque Nationale de France, Paris. These manuscripts include the early drafts of her main philosophical work, the Institutions de physique.

== Elisabeth of Bohemia Prize ==
The Elisabeth of Bohemia Prize was named in honor of philosopher and Princess Palatine, Elisabeth of Bohemia (1618–1680), who was also a long-time correspondent and friend of fellow philosopher René Descartes. The award was established to acknowledge research on women in the history of philosophy. The prize is endowed with 3500 Euros and is donated by Ulrike Detmers. Awardees include Keiko Kawashima (2025) and Lisa Shapiro (2018).

== Public Teaching ==
From 2017 to 2019, the Center for the History of Women Philosophers and Scientists hosted the Libori Summer School in Paderborn, Germany. The conferences were open to the public and featured scholars from all over the world giving talks and master classes. The Center HWPS also hosts online teaching seminars. For their offering of Massive Open Online Courses (MOOC), the Center was awarded the Fellowship für Innovations in Digital University Teaching.
