= Alix Cohen =

French born philosopher

- Born: April 18, 1976 (age 50); Paris, France
- Spouse: N/A
- Children: Noa Todd-Cohen (12)

Education
- Education: Cambridge University (PhD)
- Thesis: Kant's critique of the human sciences (2005)

Philosophical work
- Era: 21st-century philosophy
- Region: Western philosophy
- School: Kantian philosophy
- Institutions: University of Edinburgh University of Notre Dame

Alix Cohen (born 1976) is a French philosopher and Professor of Philosophy at the University of Notre Dame. She is known for her works on Kant's thought. She is the current Co-Editor with Sacha Golob of the British Journal for the History of Philosophy.

== Books ==
- Kant on the Human Sciences: Biology, Anthropology and History, Palgrave, 2009
- Thinking about the Emotions: A Philosophical History, co-editor with Bob Stern, OUP, 2017
- Kant on Emotions and Value (ed.), Palgrave, 2014
- Critical Guide to Kant’s Lectures on Anthropology (ed.), CUP, 2014
- Kant on Emotions, OUP, forthcoming
