= Ruth Hagengruber =

German philosopher

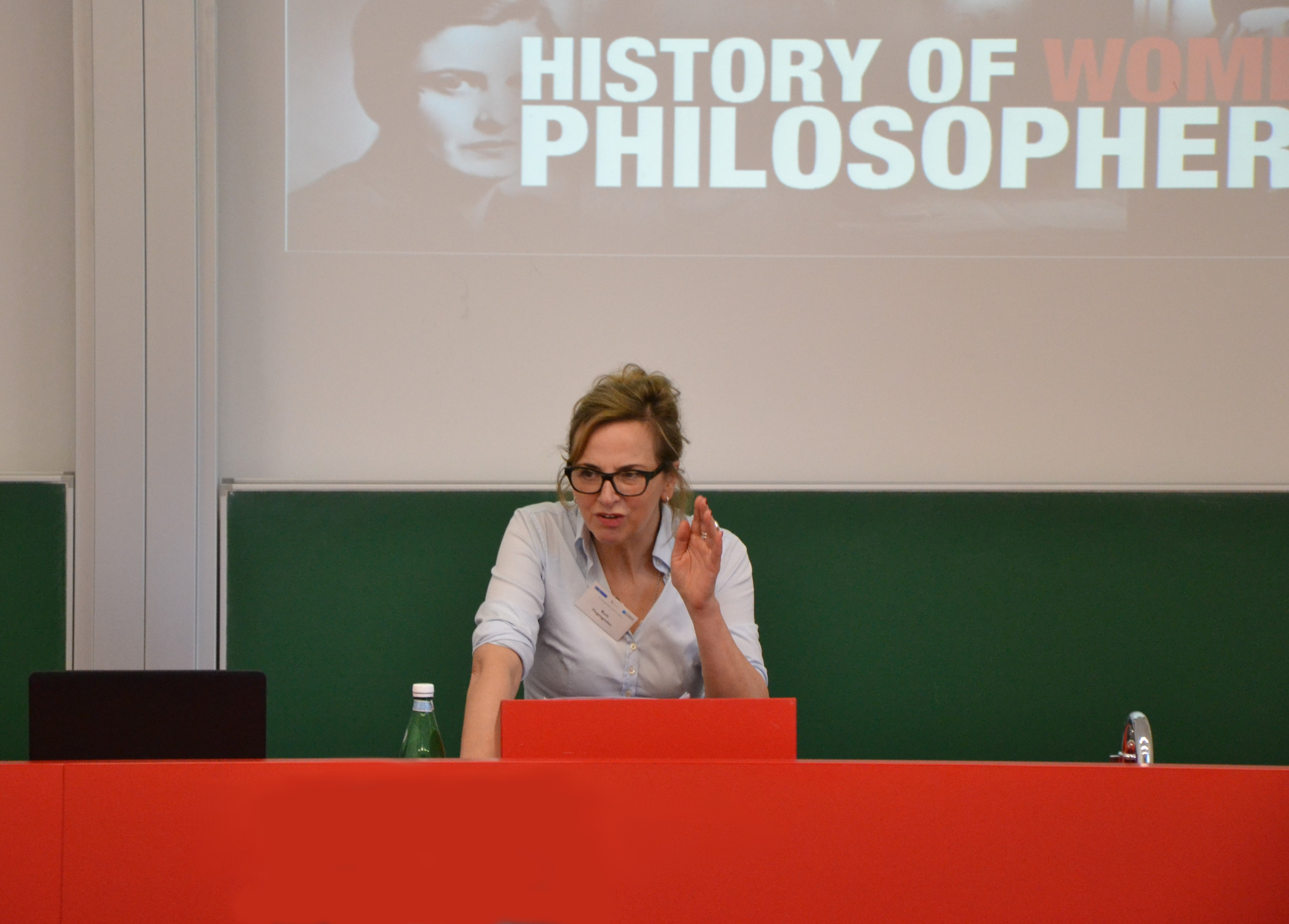
- Born: 1958
- Education: LMU Munich
- Employer: University of Paderborn

Ruth Hagengruber (born 1958) is a German philosopher, currently professor and head of philosophy at the University of Paderborn. She specialises in the history of women philosophers as well as philosophy of economics and computer science and is a specialist on Émilie Du Châtelet. Hagengruber is the director of the Center for the History of Women Philosophers and Scientists and founder of the research area EcoTechGender. She invented the Libori Summer School and is the creator of the Encyclopedia of Concise Concepts by Women Philosophers, for which she holds the position of editor in chief together with Mary Ellen Waithe. In 2025, she was elected President of the Deutsche Gesellschaft für Philosophie.

Hagengruber’s research is dedicated to the revision of a patriarchal history, specially to the rediscovery of women’s alternative contributions to the history of philosophy and the history of economics, focusing on circle and universality based economics as an approach of inclusive economic ethics. She published on value theory in Feminist Economics and reflects on technical design from a feminist (and inclusive) point of view, such as autonomous driving, a different approach to labour, and a profound acknowledgment of creative skills.

== Career ==
Hagengruber was born in Regen. She earned her PhD in philosophy from LMU Munich and taught at the philosophy department at the University of Koblenz and Landau and the University of Cologne before coming to Paderborn University to be professor and head of philosophy. In April 2012, the first Master Erasmus Joint Programme dedicated to the Study of the History of Women Philosophers was established in cooperation between Paderborn University and Yeditepe University in Istanbul.

== Academic activities and awards ==
Hagengruber was vice president of the Deutsche Gesellschaft für Französischsprachige Philosophie (1997-2002) and the European Society for Early Modern Philosophy ESEMP (2004–2007). She was also a member of the Advisory Board of the Munich Center for Technology in Society (MCTS) at the Technical University of Munich (2011-2019). From 2019-2025, Hagengruber was vice president of the Deutsche Akademikerinnenbund DAB and was elected member of the Leibniz Sozietät der Wissenschaften zu Berlin. Hagengruber is an honorary member of the International Association for Computing and Philosophy (IACAP) and a board member of the International Association of Women Philosophers (IAPH) and organizer of the IAPH conference Defining the Future, Rethinking the Past. Furthermore, she directs the research and work group Frauen in der Geschichte der Philosophie (Women in History of Philosophy) of the Deutsche Gesellschaft für Philosophie. In 2016 she founded the Center for the History of Women Philosophers and Scientists.

== Teaching and research areas ==
=== History of Women Philosophers and Scientists ===
The Teaching and Research Area "History of Women Philosophers" headed by Hagengruber aims at renewing the long-lasting tradition of women philosophers. Ruth Hagengruber started her lecture "2600 Years History of Women Philosophers" in 2011. In 2016, she founded the research project Center for the History of Women Philosophers and Scientists. In this capacity, she awards the Elisabeth of Bohemia Prize for the recognition of women in the history of philosophy since 2018 and published the first digital and historical-critical edition of Émilie du Châtelets St Petersburg Manuscripts.

Hagengruber has edited various books on the history of women philosophers. In 2015, she edited the special issue of The Monist on the "History of Women's Ideas" together with Karen Green. She created the German book series Frauen in Philosophie und Wissenschaft and the international book series Women in the History of Philosophy and Sciences with Mary Ellen Waithe and Gianni Paganini. In 2019, she edited a special issue of the British Journal for the History of Philosophy on "Women Philosophers in Early Modern Philosophy" with Sarah Hutton.

=== EcoTechGender ===
In 2006, Hagengruber founded the Teaching and Research Area: EcoTechGender on the social and ethical implications of artificial intelligence.
