= Matthias Koßler =

German philosopher (born 1960)

Matthias Koßler (born 19 February 1960 in Frankfurt) is a German philosopher. He is a professor of philosophy at Johannes Gutenberg University Mainz and president of the Schopenhauer Society.

== Life ==
Koßler studied philosophy, art history, and church history at Johannes Gutenberg University Mainz from 1978 to 1988. In 1990 he received his doctorate under Rudolf Malter with a comparative study of Hegel and Schopenhauer. He completed his habilitation in 1997 with the thesis Empirische Ethik und christliche Moral.

Prior to this he held various academic positions and teaching appointments at the universities of Mainz and University of Koblenz-Landau. After serving as a substitute professor at the universities of Mainz and University of Freiburg, he founded the Schopenhauer Research Centre at Mainz in 2001 and has served as its director since then. Since 2003 he has been an adjunct professor (apl. Professor) of philosophy and research associate at Johannes Gutenberg University Mainz.

Since 2000 Koßler has been president of the Schopenhauer Society. Since 2001 he has also been one of the principal editors of the journal Schopenhauer-Jahrbuch.

His research interests include the philosophy of Arthur Schopenhauer, medieval philosophy, German idealism, as well as ethics, epistemology, and metaphysics.

== Selected works ==
=== Monographs ===
- Substantielles Wissen und subjektives Handeln, dargestellt in einem Vergleich von Hegel und Schopenhauer. Frankfurt am Main, 1990.
- Empirische Ethik und christliche Moral. Zur Differenz einer areligiösen und einer religiösen Grundlegung der Ethik am Beispiel der Gegenüberstellung Schopenhauers mit Augustinus, der Scholastik und Luther. Würzburg, 1999.

=== Edited volumes ===
- With R. Zecher: Von der Perspektive der Philosophie. Beiträge zur Bestimmung eines philosophischen Standpunkts in einer von den Naturwissenschaften geprägten Zeit. Hamburg, 2002.
- With B. Salaquarda and K. Broese: Die Deutung der Welt. Jörg Salaquardas Schriften zur Philosophie Schopenhauers. Würzburg, 2007.
- Politik und Gesellschaft im Umkreis Arthur Schopenhauers. Würzburg, 2008.
- Schopenhauer und die Philosophien Asiens. Wiesbaden, 2008.
- With D. M. Fazio and F. Cirací: Schopenhauer und die Schopenhauer-Schule. Würzburg, 2008.
- With Daniel Schubbe: Schopenhauer-Handbuch: Leben – Werk – Wirkung. 2nd edition. Stuttgart: J. B. Metzler, 2018.

=== Journals ===
- Schopenhauer-Jahrbuch (editor, with Dieter Birnbacher and others), from vol. 82 (2001).
