= Dominik Perler =

Swiss philosopher (born 1965)

Dominik Perler (born 17 March 1965) is Professor of Philosophy at Humboldt-Universität zu Berlin, and co-director of the Institute for Advanced Studies in the Humanities Human Abilities.

== Career ==
Perler studied Philosophy and Russian Literature at the Universities of Fribourg (Switzerland), Bern and Göttingen. He received his doctorate in Fribourg in 1991 with the thesis Der propositionale Wahrheitsbegriff im 14. Jahrhundert. He then worked as a visiting scholar at Cornell University in 1991/92, as a visiting assistant professor at the University of California, Los Angeles, in 1992/93 and as a lecturer at the University of Göttingen from 1993 to 1995. In 1996 he habilitated there with the thesis Representation in Descartes. In 1996/97 Perler was a Fellow of All Souls and University Lecturer at the University of Oxford. In 1997 the University of Basel appointed him full professor of philosophy. Since 2003 he has been professor of theoretical philosophy at the Humboldt-Universität zu Berlin.

Perler was a Fellow at the Wissenschaftskolleg zu Berlin in 2004/05. In 2009 he was Silverman Professor at Tel Aviv University and in spring 2010 Fellow at the Istituto Svizzero di Roma. In the fall of the same year, he was Carl Schurz Memorial Professor at the University of Wisconsin-Madison. In 2011 he gave the Leibniz Lectures at the University of Hanover, and in 2012 he was Edith Bruce Lecturer at the University of Toronto. Perler was a Global Scholar at Princeton University from 2013 to 2015. In 2016 he worked as Chaim Perelman Professor at the Université libre de Bruxelles and in 2017 as visiting professor at the École normale supérieure in Paris. In 2022 he was a visiting professor at the École Pratique des Hautes Études in Paris.

Perler has been a member of the Berlin-Brandenburg Academy of Sciences and Humanities since 2007. He was President of the European Society for Early Modern Philosophy from 2007 to 2010. From 2015 to 2017 he was President of the German Society for Philosophy. In 2020 he was elected a member of the Academia Europaea. Also since 2020 he has been the co-director of the Institute for Advanced Studies in the Humanities Human Abilities.

In 2006 Perler was awarded the Gottfried Wilhelm Leibniz Prize of the Deutsche Forschungsgemeinschaft, the highest honour awarded in German research. In 2014 the Université catholique de Louvain awarded him an honorary doctorate.

== Research areas ==
Perler's work focuses on the philosophy of the Middle Ages and early modern philosophy – especially the theoretical philosophy of these epochs. He aims at reconstructing existing theories historically and systematically using today's philosophical methods and at the same time placing the historical positions in the debates of modern analytical philosophy. He became known for this method through his book on theories of intentionality in the Middle Ages. Perler has also worked intensively on the interactions between Christian and Arabic philosophy. Systematically, he also deals with epistemology and the philosophy of mind. In the philosophy of mind, his research interests focus on early modern theories, theories of emotion and the consciousness of animals.

He is a member of the advisory board of several journals, including Journal of the History of Philosophy, British Journal for the History of Philosophy, History of Philosophy Quarterly, Vivarium, Archiv für Geschichte der Philosophie, Zeitschrift für philosophische Forschung, Oxford Studies in Medieval Philosophy.

== Publications (selection) ==
=== Monographs ===
- Der propositionale Wahrheitsbegriff im 14. Jahrhundert. De Gruyter, Berlin 1992.
- Repräsentation bei Descartes. Klostermann, Frankfurt am Main 1996.
  - Chinese translation: 笛卡尔论表征, Beijing: The Commercial Press 2023.
- René Descartes. Beck, München 1998; second edition 2006.
- mit Ulrich Rudolph: Occasionalismus. Theorien der Kausalität im arabisch-islamischen und im europäischen Denken. Vandenhoeck & Ruprecht, Göttingen 2000.
- Theorien der Intentionalität im Mittelalter. Klostermann, Frankfurt am Main 2002; second edition 2004; third edition 2020.
  - Shorter French edition: Théories de l’intentionnalité au Moyen Age, Paris: Vrin 2003.
  - Full Russian translation: Teorii intenzionalnosti v srednie veka, Moskva: Izdatelskii dom delo 2016.
- Zweifel und Gewissheit. Skeptische Debatten im Mittelalter. Klostermann, Frankfurt am Main 2006; second edition 2012.
- Transformationen der Gefühle. Philosophische Emotionstheorien 1270–1670. S. Fischer, Frankfurt am Main 2011.
  - English translation: Feelings Transformed. Philosophical Theories of the Emotions 1270-1670, Oxford: Oxford University Press 2018.
- Eine Person sein. Philosophische Debatten im Spätmittelalter. Klostermann, Frankfurt am Main 2020.

=== Editorships ===
- Ancient and Medieval Theories of Intentionality. Brill, Leiden 2001.
- with Ansgar Beckermann: Klassiker der Philosophie heute. Reclam, Stuttgart 2004.
- with Markus Wild: Der Geist der Tiere. Philosophische Texte zu einer aktuellen Debatte. Suhrkamp, Frankfurt am Main 2005.
- with Ulrich Rudolph: Logik und Theologie. Das Organon im arabischen und im lateinischen Mittelalter. Brill, Leiden 2005.
- with Markus Wild: Sehen und Begreifen. Wahrnehmungstheorien in der frühen Neuzeit. De Gruyter, Berlin 2008.
- with Johannes Haag: Ideen. Repräsentationalismus in der Frühen Neuzeit. De Gruyter, Berlin 2010.
- with Klaus Corcilius: Partitioning the Soul. Debates from Plato to Leibniz. De Gruyter, Berlin 2014.
- with Sonja Schierbaum: Selbstbezug und Selbstwissen. Texte zu einer mittelalterlichen Debatte. Klostermann, Frankfurt am Main 2014.
- The Faculties: A History (Series “Oxford Philosophical Concepts”), Oxford: Oxford University Press 2015.
- with Sebastian Bender: Causation and Cognition in Early Modern Philosophy, London: Routledge 2020; paperback edition 2021.
- with Sebastian Bender: Powers and Abilities in Early Modern Philosophy, London: Routledge 2024.
