= Peter Petersen (musicologist) =

German musicologist

- Born: 17 July 1940 (age 86); Hamburg, Germany
- Education: University of Hamburg
- Occupation: Musicologist
- Organizations: University of Hamburg
- Notable work: Lexikon verfolgter Musiker und Musikerinnen der NS-Zeit
- Awards: Fischer-Appelt-Prize

Peter Petersen (born 17 July 1940) is a German musicologist and professor emeritus of the University of Hamburg. He focused on 20th-century music, rhythm, and was instrumental in the university's Exile Music Working Group and the online Lexikon verfolgter Musiker und Musikerinnen der NS-Zeit.

== Life ==
Born in Hamburg, Petersen first studied music pedagogy, then historical musicology and German literature at the University of Hamburg. In 1971 he received his doctorate with a dissertation on tonality in instrumental music by Béla Bartók. After his habilitation in 1981 with a paper on Alban Berg's Wozzeck, he taught as a professor at the University of Hamburg from 1985. In 2001 the university honoured him with the Fischer-Appelt-Prize for outstanding achievements in academic teaching. He retired in 2005.

Petersen is married to the violin teacher Marianne Petersen. They live in Hamburg and have two daughters.

== Research ==
One focus of Petersen's research is in the field of 20th century music (among others Bartók, Berg, Hölszky, Lutosławski). Several monographs and numerous essays deal with the work of Hans Werner Henze.

Through Petersen's commitment, the Musicological Institute of the University of Hamburg became a centre of exile music research: Petersen founded and directed the "Exile Music Working Group", which existed for almost 30 years, and won over numerous students and colleagues to work on the effects of Nazi rule, exile and the Holocaust on musical life. Petersen is editor of the series "Music in the 'Third Reich' and "in Exile" and co-editor of the Online-Lexikon verfolgter Musiker und Musikerinnen der NS-Zeit.

Petersen perfected the process of "semantic analysis" of subject-bound compositions and especially of works of music theatre. Based on meticulous score analyses, which are then contextualized, his investigations often open up the content-related connections of such compositions in a completely new way – for example, the structure of meaning in Alban Berg's Wozzeck and in Richard Strauss' Friedenstag.

In the field of music theory, Petersen developed a fundamentally new rhythm theory ("Komponententheorie"), which detaches the concept of duration from the individual tone and recognises all sound phenomena ("components") as having rhythm-generating potential (sound, pitch, diastematic, articulation, dynamics, timbre, harmony, texture, phrase, speech). The "component rhythms" are visualized in multi-line "rhythm scores". Accumulation of the component rhythms results in single-line "rhythm profiles" that precisely map the "rhythmic weight" in the musical progression.

== Writings ==
Peterrson's writings are listed by the University of Hamburg:

=== Monographs ===
- Die Tonalität im Instrumentalschaffen von Béla Bartók (dissertation). in: Hamburger Beiträge zur Musikwissenschaft vol. 6, Hamburg: Wagner 1971. OCLC 603614359
- "Alban Berg: Wozzeck. Eine semantische Analyse unter Einbeziehung der Skizzen und Dokumente aus dem Nachlaß Bergs". (Special issue Musik-Konzepte), Munich: edition text + kritik 1985. OCLC 801181740
- Hans Werner Henze. Ein politischer Musiker. Zwölf Vorlesungen. Hamburg: Argument 1988. OCLC 18878422
- "Hans Werner Henze. Werke der Jahre 1984-93", Kölner Schriften zur Neuen Musik, vol. 4, Mainz: Schott 1995.
- Orientierung Musikwissenschaft. Was sie kann, was sie will. Reinbek: Rowohlt 2000 (with Helmut Rösing). OCLC 923715783
- Musik und Rhythmus. Grundlagen, Geschichte, Analyse. Mainz among others: Schott 2010. OCLC 862962424
- Music and Rhythm. Fundamentals – History – Analysis. revised and expanded version of the original German edition, translated by Ernest Bernhardt-Kabisch, Frankfurt among others: Lang 2013.
- Hans Werner Henze – Ingeborg Bachmann. "Undine" and "Tasso" in ballet, narrative, concert and poem, Schliengen: Argus 2014.
- Friedenstag von Stefan Zweig, Richard Strauss und Joseph Gregor. Eine pazifistische Oper im Dritten Reich. (Musik und Diktatur, vol. 2, ed. F. Geiger), Münster: Waxmann 2017. OCLC 1030460656
- Isolde und Tristan. Zur musikalischen Identität der Hauptfiguren in Richard Wagner's "Handlung" Tristan und Isolde. Würzburg: Königshausen & Neumann 2019. OCLC 1121191592

=== As editor ===
- Musikkulturgeschichte. Festschrift for the 60th birthday of Constantin Floros, ed. P. Petersen, Wiesbaden: Breitkopf & Härtel 1990.
- Musik im Exil. Folgen des Nazismus für die internationale Musikkultur, ed. H.-W. Heister, C. Maurer Zenck and P. Petersen, Frankfurt: Fischer Taschenbuchverlag 1993.
- Zündende Lieder – Verbrannte Musik. Folgen des Nazifaschismus für Hamburger Musiker und Musikerinnen. Completely revised edition [of the first edition from 1988], ed. P. Petersen and the Working Group Exile Music at the Musicological Institute of the University of Hamburg, Hamburg: VSA 1995. OCLC 499166670
- "Stimmen" für Hans Werner Henze. Die 22 Lieder aus "Voices", ed. P. Petersen, H.-W. Heister and H. Lück, Mainz among others: Schott 1996.
- Musik im "Dritten Reich" und im Exil. publication series, 20 volumes up to now. Hamburg: von Bockel 1996 ff. (until vol. 11 co-publisher: Hanns-Werner Heister)
- Das "Reichs-Brahmsfest" 1933 in Hamburg. Rekonstruktion und Dokumentation, ed. Working Group Exile Music at the Musicological Institute of the University of Hamburg, Hamburg: von Bockel 1997.
- Büchner-Opern. Georg Büchner in der Musik des 20. Jahrhunderts. Ed. P. Petersen and H.-G. Winter (HJbMw vol. 14), Frankfurt: Lang 1997. OCLC 468187665
- 50 Jahre Musikwissenschaftliches Institut in Hamburg. Bestandsaufnahme – aktuelle Forschung – Ausblick, ed. P. Petersen and H. Rösing (HJbMw vol. 16), Frankfurt: Lang 1999.
- Lebenswege von Musikerinnen im "Dritten Reich" und im Exil (ed.) Working Group Exile Music at the Musicological Institute of the University of Hamburg, Hamburg: von Bockel 2000. OCLC 45968909
- "Hans Werner Henze". Die Vorträge des internationalen Symposions am Musikwissenschaftlichen Institut der Universität Hamburg, 28 – 30 June 2001, ed. P. Petersen (HJbMw Bd. 20), Frankfurt: Lang 2003.
- Berthold Goldschmidt. Komponist und Dirigent. Ein Musiker-Leben zwischen Hamburg, Berlin und London. Ed. P. Petersen and Working Group Exile Music at the Musicological Institute of the University of Hamburg, Hamburg: von Bockel 1994. – 2nd, corrected and supplemented edition 2003. OCLC 723151032
- "Musiktheater im Exil der NS-Zeit". Bericht über die Internationale Konferenz am Musikwissenschaftlichen Institut der Universität Hamburg 3–5 February 2005, ed. P. Petersen and C. Maurer Zenck (Musik im "Dritten Reich" und im Exil vol. 12), Hamburg: von Bockel 2007.
- Lexikon verfolgter Musiker und Musikerinnen der NS-Zeit, Online-Lexikon, ed. C. Maurer Zenck, P. Petersen and S. Fetthauer, University of Hamburg 2005 ff.

=== Festschriften for Peter Petersen ===
- Komposition als Kommunikation. Zur Musik des 20. Jahrhunderts. Ed. C. Floros, F. Geiger and T. Schäfer (HJbMw Bd. 17), Frankfurt: Lang 2000. OCLC 925103186
- Fokus 'Deutsches Miserere' by Paul Dessau and Bertolt Brecht. Festschrift to the 65. birthday of Peter Petersen. Publisher N. Ermlich Lehmann, S. Fetthauer, M. Lehmann, J. Rothkamm, S. Wenzel and K. Wille, Hamburg: von Bockel 2005. OCLC 762548441
