= Daniel Schubbe-Åkerlund =

German philosopher and author

Daniel Schubbe-Åkerlund is a German philosopher and author. He teaches at the University of Hagen and is affiliated with the Department of Philosophy at University of Mainz.

== Life ==
Schubbe studied political science and philosophy at the Carl von Ossietzky University of Oldenburg. His research focuses on hermeneutics, political philosophy, and philosophy of science.

Since 2012, he has been a member of the board of the Schopenhauer Society.

== Honours ==
- 2004 – Essay Prize of the Schopenhauer Society
- 2017 – Teaching Award of the FernUniversität in Hagen

== Selected works ==
=== Monographs ===
- Philosophie de l’entre-deux: Herméneutique et aporétique chez Schopenhauer. Translated by Marie-José Pernin. Nancy, 2018. ISBN 978-2-8143-0518-2.
- Philosophie des Zwischen: Hermeneutik und Aporetik bei Schopenhauer. Würzburg, 2010. ISBN 978-3-8260-4309-3.

=== Edited volumes ===
- With Thomas Bedorf and Anna Tuschling: Grundbegriffe digitaler Kultur. Hagen, 2025. doi:10.57813/20250404-080959-0
- With Jens Lemanski: Schopenhauer-Lexikon. Paderborn, 2021. ISBN 978-3-506-78652-8.
- Schopenhauer-Handbuch: Leben – Werk – Wirkung. Springer. 5 March 2018. ISBN 978-3-476-04559-1.
- With Thomas Regehly: Schopenhauer und die Deutung der Existenz. Stuttgart, 2016. ISBN 978-3-476-05589-7.
- With Søren R. Fauth: Schopenhauer und Goethe. Hamburg, 2016. ISBN 978-3-7873-3009-6.
- With Matthias Koßler: Schopenhauer-Handbuch: Leben – Werk – Wirkung. 2nd edition. Stuttgart: J. B. Metzler, 2018.

=== Editions ===
- With Judith Werntgen-Schmidt and Daniel Elon: Arthur Schopenhauer: Vorlesung über die gesamte Philosophie oder die Lehre vom Wesen der Welt und dem menschlichen Geiste, 4 vols., Hamburg, 2017–2022.
  - Volume 1: ISBN 978-3-7873-4011-8.
  - Volume 2: ISBN 978-3-7873-3643-2.
  - Volume 3: ISBN 978-3-7873-3522-0.
  - Volume 4: ISBN 978-3-7873-3179-6.

=== Selected articles ===
- “Schopenhauer as an environmental ethicist?” Schopenhauer-Jahrbuch 106 (2026): 103–120.
- “Schopenhauer as Hermeneutician? A reply to Thomas Regehly.” Schopenhauer-Jahrbuch 100 (2020): 139–147.
- With Jens Lemanski: “Problems and Interpretations of Schopenhauer’s World as Will and Representation.” Voluntas: Revista Internacional de Filosofia 10.1 (2019): 199–210. Online
