= Jens Timmermann =

German philosopher (born 1970)

- Born: 1 May 1970 (age 56)
- Awards: Alexander von Humboldt Foundation Fellowship, German National Scholarship Foundation Fellowship, Junior International Kant Prize

Education
- Education: University of Göttingen
- Thesis: Sittengesetz und Freiheit: Untersuchungen zu Immanuel Kants Theorie des freien Willens (1998)

Philosophical work
- Era: Contemporary philosophy
- Region: Western philosophy
- School: Kantianism
- Institutions: University of St Andrews
- Main interests: Kantian ethics, political philosophy, philosophy of law

Jens Timmermann (born 1 May 1970) is a German philosopher and the Professor of Moral Philosophy at the University of St Andrews. He is best known for his research on Kant’s ethics, political philosophy and philosophy of law.

== Career ==
Jens Timmermann was educated at the University of Göttigen and at Balliol College, Oxford. He completed his PhD, entitled Sittengesetz und Freiheit: Untersuchungen zu Immanuel Kants Theorie des freien Willens, in 1998 under the supervision of Günther Patzig and Konrad Cramer. Prior to his appointment as lecturer at the University of St Andrews in 2000, Timmermann held a Junior Research Fellowship at Keble College, Oxford. In 2015, he was promoted to the Chair of Moral Philosophy at the University of St Andrews and in 2023 he was elected as a member of the Academia Europaea.

Timmermann has translated and edited several of the English language translations of the works of Immanuel Kant. He has also written extensively on Kant in his own writings including in Kant’s Will at the Crossroads, a monograph on Kant’s theory of practical irrationality, and in Kant and the Supposed Right to Lie, a monograph on the Kant–Constant controversy.

== Books ==
- Sittengesetz Und Freiheit: Untersuchungen Zu Immanuel Kants Theorie Des Freien Willens, De Gruyter, 2003
- Kant's Groundwork of the Metaphysics of Morals: A Commentary, Cambridge University Press, 2007
- Kant's 'Groundwork of the Metaphysics of Morals': A Critical Guide (ed.), Cambridge University Press, 2009
- Kant's Critique of Practical Reason: A Critical Guide, Co-editor with Andrews Reath, Cambridge University Press, 2010
- Groundwork of the Metaphysics of Morals: A German-English Edition, ed. and tr. Mary Gregor and Jens Timmermann. Cambridge University Press, 2011
- Kant's 'Tugendlehre', Co-editor with Oliver Sensen and Andreas Trampota, De Gruyter, 2013
- The Cambridge History of Moral Philosophy, Co-editor with Sacha Golob, Cambridge University Press, 2017
- Kant's Will at the Crossroads: an essay on the failings of practical rationality, Oxford University Press, 2022
- Kant and the Supposed Right to Lie, Cambridge University Press, 2025
