= Homberg (Efze) =

- Town
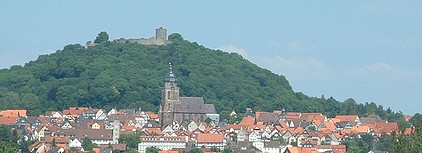
- Schlossberg with the Hohenburg and Homberg's Old Town

- Coat of arms

- Location of Homberg within Schwalm-Eder-Kreis district
- Interactive map of Homberg
- Location within Germany Location within Hesse
- Coordinates: 51°02′N 09°24′E
- Country: Germany
- State: Hesse
- Admin. region: Kassel
- District: Schwalm-Eder-Kreis
- Subdivisions: 20 Ortsteile

Government
  - Mayor (2020–26): Nico Ritz (Ind.)

Area
  - Total: 100.11 km^{2} (38.65 sq mi)
- Elevation: 222 m (728 ft)

Population (2025-12-31)
  - Total: 14,562
  - Density: 145.46/km^{2} (376.74/sq mi)
- Time zone: UTC+01:00 (CET)
  - Summer (DST): UTC+02:00 (CEST)
- Postal codes: 34576
- Dialling codes: 05681
- Vehicle registration: HR
- Website: homberg-efze.eu

Homberg (German pronunciation: [ˈhɔmbɛʁk]) is a small town in the northern part of Hesse, a state in central Germany, with about 15,000 inhabitants. It is the seat of the Schwalm-Eder district. In 2008, the town hosted the 48th Hessentag state festival.

== Geography ==
Homberg lies in the transitional zone between the West Hesse Depression, a sunken area dating from the Tertiary sub-era, and the Knüll (or Knüllgebirge), a low mountain range. The town itself stretches over several hills underlain mainly with basalt. The river Efze flows from the Knüll through Homberg, later emptying into the river Schwalm. There exist small coal deposits in the immediate area.

== Constituent communities ==
Homberg consists of the following communities:

- Allmuthshausen
- Berge
- Caßdorf
- Dickershausen
- Holzhausen
- Hombergshausen
- Hülsa
- Lembach
- Lützelwig
- Mardorf
- Mörshausen
- Mühlhausen
- Relbehausen
- Rodemann
- Roppershain
- Sondheim
- Steindorf
- Waßmuthshausen
- Welferode
- Wernswig

== History ==
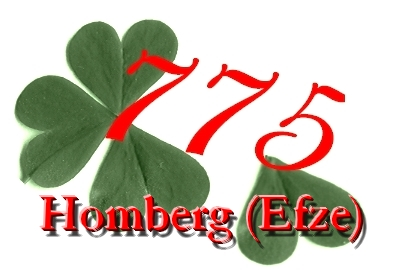

Homberg was founded by the Hessian-Thuringian Landgraves and had its first documentary mention as a town in 1231. The place had indeed been settled earlier, but Homberg still celebrated its 775th anniversary as a town in 2006.

The town's name comes from the Hohenburg, the castle above Homberg. The castle well, at 150 m deep is Germany's third deepest castle well.

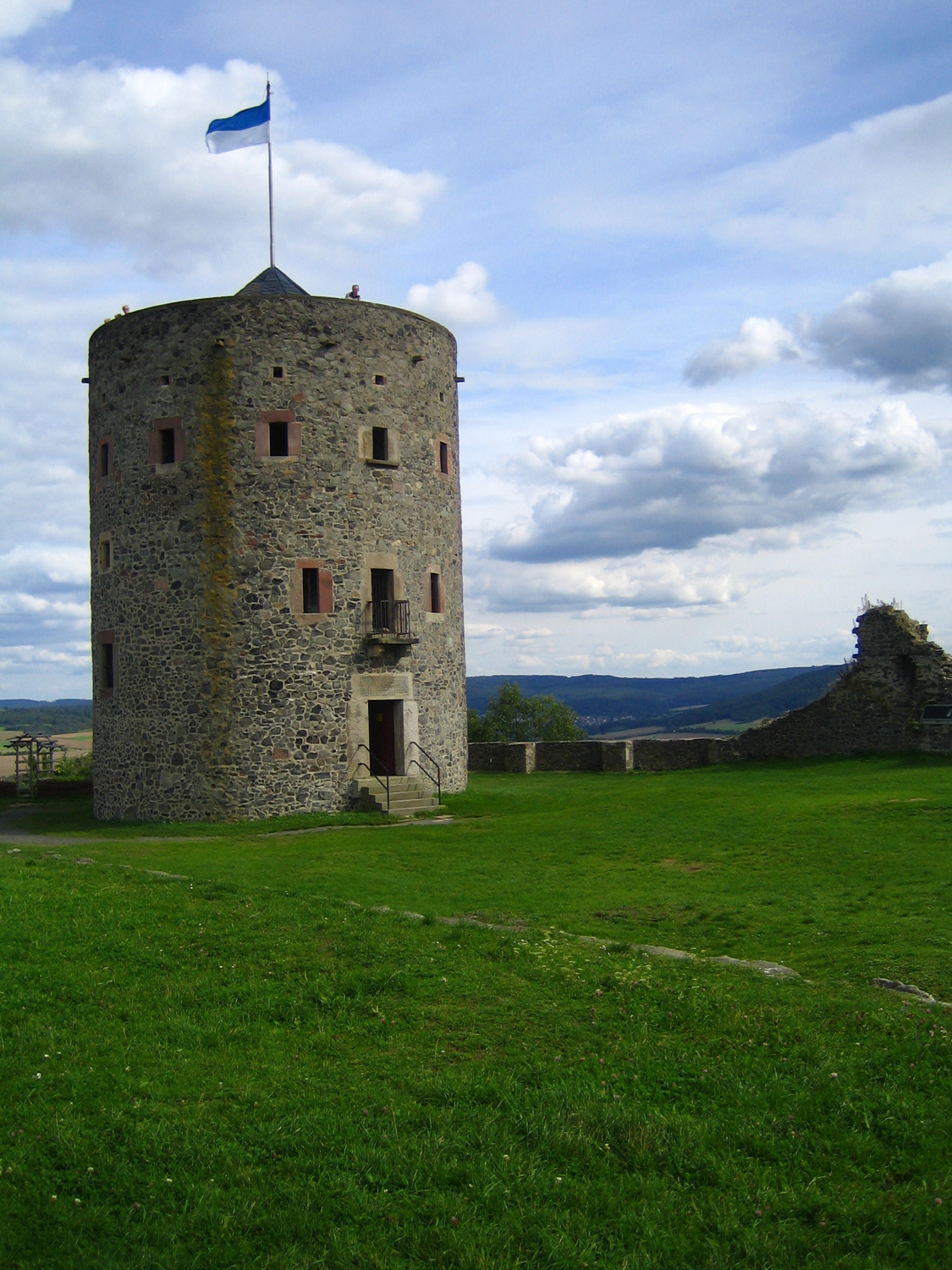
Hohenburg lookout tower

In 1526, at the Marienkirche (church) under Hessian Landgrave Philip, the Homberg Synod took place, whereby Hesse became Protestant.

In August 1640, the town was taken by Imperialist forces.

In 1809, under Colonel Wilhelm von Dörnberg, the so-called Dörnberg Uprising went forth from Homberg against King Jérôme, but was soundly defeated.

== Town planning ==
Like most German towns, Homberg was likely laid out according to a plan in Hohenstaufen times (1138–1254). Peculiarities in the way that Homberg was built, not apparent at first glance, hint at something recognizable as a town plan. Homberg is in itself a double town, consisting of the Old Town (Altstadt), first mentioned in a document in 1231, and Die Freiheit ("The Freedom"). Die Freiheit was an independent town, having been founded in 1356 and united with the Old Town in 1536. The Old Town itself consisted of three wards.

Looking at the town map, the three main ways into the town through the former gateways can be recognized: Westheimer Tor, Obertor and Holzhäuser Tor (Tor = gate).

The middle and end point of each of the street connections in the town is the marketplace, over which rises the town church, St. Marien, once surrounded by the town's cemetery. A regular plan is not to be seen in the town. However, in one way the town has something in common with many other towns founded in the Middle Ages that is only noticeable at second glance: when laying out the town's streets, the mediaeval town planner deliberately made them crooked and deliberately staggered intersections of streets and alleyways. In particular, building crooked streets was a way of giving them some aesthetic appeal, as with the Untergasse. Crookedness limits the streetscape optically, and at the end of the street is a T-junction, with a view of houses opposite. In the Untergasse, this was the town's former brewhouse, standing on the corner of the Untergasse ("Lower Lane") and the Entengasse ("Duck Lane"). The Untergasse's original alignment was lost as a result of town renovations. It can now only be discerned by looking at houses' positions or by looking over the town.

The same effect was achieved when the town planner staggered the side lanes or had them meet the main streets at a slanted angle. By deftly planning the town in this way, even drafts were avoided. Another way of doing this same thing was to build houses out of alignment with their neighbours, or even whole blocks out of alignment with the rest of the street. This can still very clearly be seen around Obere Westheimer Straße. Such a thing was also done on Untere Westheimer Straße, but the ravages of time have erased the effect.

== Politics ==
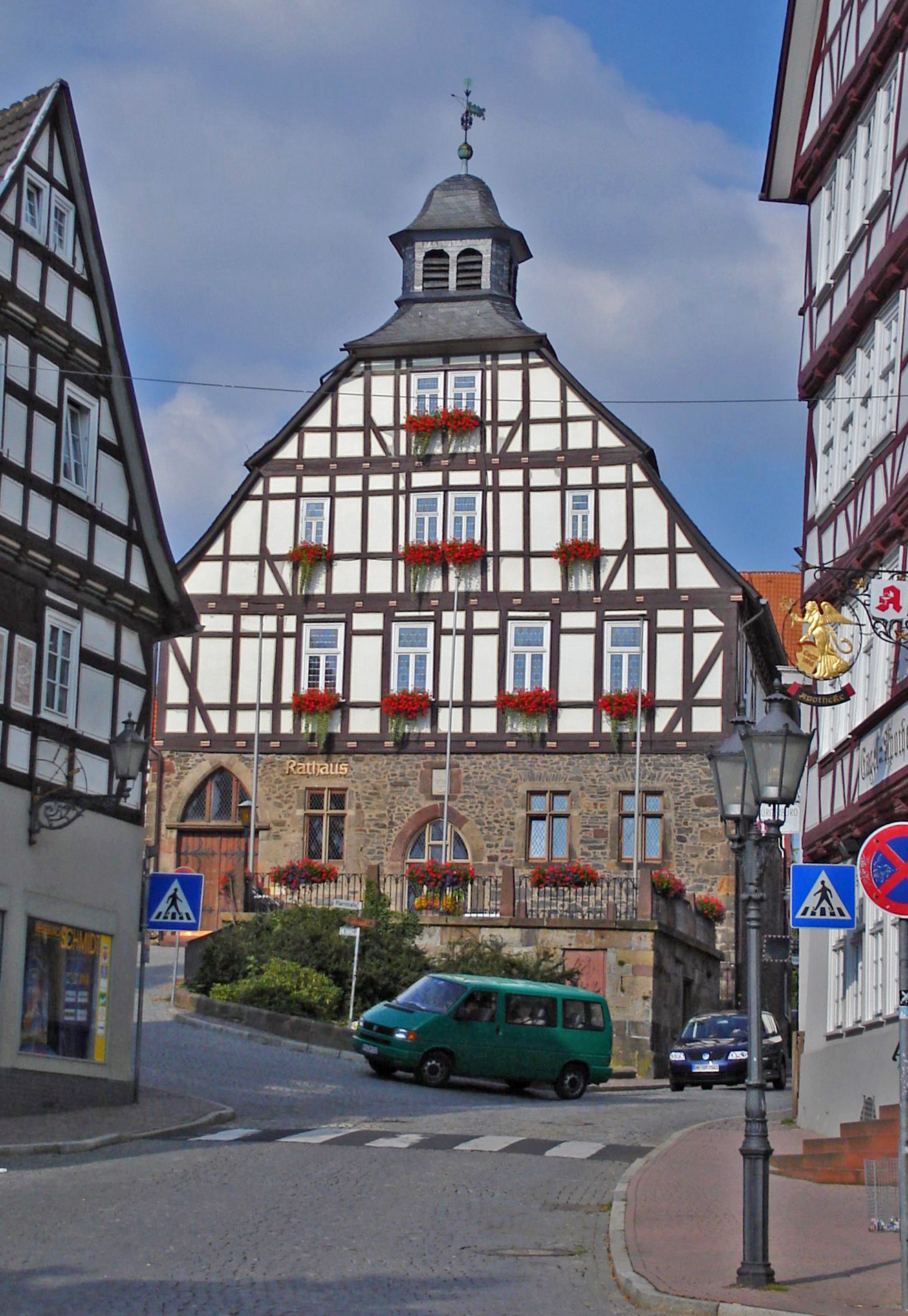
Town Hall

=== Town council ===
The town council is made up of 37 members.

- CDU: 12 seats
- SPD: 13 seats
- FDP: 2 seats
- Greens: 4 seats
- Freie Waehler: 6 seats

The town executive consists of 10 councillors and the mayor. Four seats are held by the SPD, three by the CDU, one by the Greens, one by the FDP and one by the Freie Waehler.

(as of municipal elections held on 27 March 2011)

=== Twin towns – Sister cities ===
Homberg is twinned with:

(Belarus)	Stolin, Belarus, since 1992
(United Kingdom)	Bridgwater, United Kingdom

=== Coat of arms ===
The town's arms might be described thus: Azure in chief a lion passant and in base two lions combattant, all Or and all armed and langued gules.

Homberg was granted town rights in 1231, and the first known seal dates from 15 years thereafter, namely 1246. Its tinctures, however, are unknown, and it only shows one lion. Another seal used as early as 1239, but known only from later examples, bore the barry (that is, horizontally striped) Lion of Hesse. In the 14th century, another charge in the arms’ base was a mount of three, but later on, this was somehow mistaken for a lion above two smaller ones. Furthermore, the smaller lions in base numbered three up until 1639, but ever since, there have been only two.

For a short while in the early 16th century, the town used another coat of arms. This one might be blazoned: Argent three trefoils vert – that is to say, a silver escutcheon with three green three-leafed cloverleaves on it in an inverted triangular pattern.

== Economy and infrastructure ==
=== Sport ===
The most prominent sporting body in Homburg is the first team of the Tischtennisabteilung der Homberger Turnerschaft e. V. (table tennis department of the Homberg Turnerschaft), who are among the greats of German table tennis. They play in the 1. Bundesliga der Frauen ("First Federal Women's League"). Their biggest win thus far has been the European ETTU Cup on 31 March 2006 with the team of Wenling Tan-Monfardini, Zhenqi Barthel and Yin Na. The opponent in the final was 3B Berlin.

Zhenqi Barthel from the Homberg Turnerschaft won the singles title at the 74th National German Championships in Minden in 2006. She also won with her doubles partner Patrick Baum in mixed doubles. In women's doubles she came third with partner Desirée Czajkowski (Watzenborn-Steinberg).

== Culture and sightseeing ==
=== Buildings ===
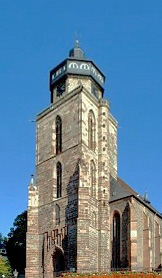
St. Mary's

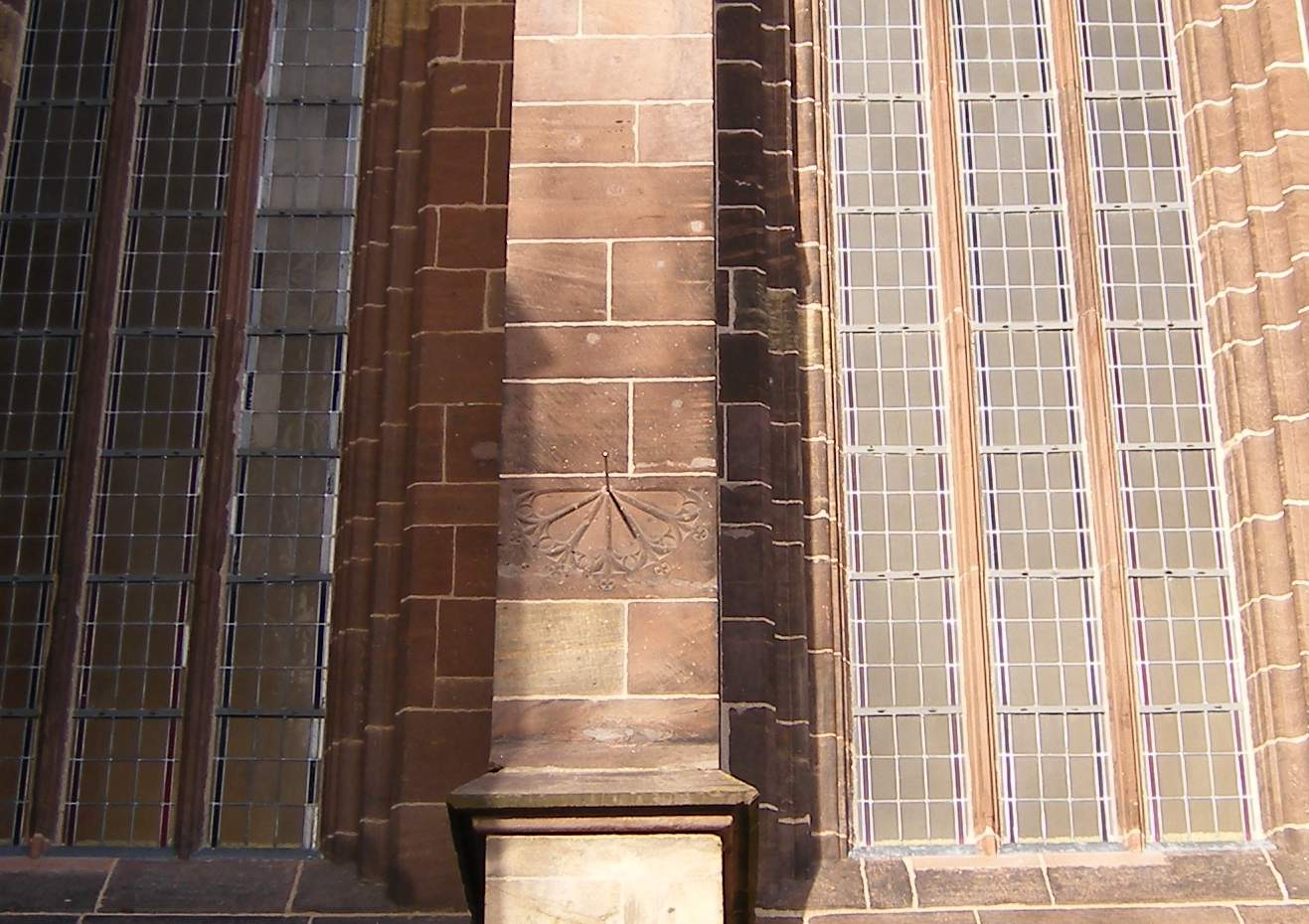
The tide dial at St Mary's

Stadtkirche St. Marien Homberg's town church, St. Marien's or St. Mary's, holds a special place in Hessian Protestantism: in 1526, Landgrave Philip the Magnanimous convened a synod in Homburg that sat in this church, marking the point in time when the Landgraviate of Hesse became Evangelical. Thus the church, one of the most important Gothic monuments in North Hesse, is sometimes called the Reformationskirche Hessens – the Reformation Church of Hesse.

What follows is something of the church's history:

- A Frankish chapel is believed to have been built on the site before 900.
- About 1000 a Romanesque church or chapel was built.
- In the 12th century, a Romanesque basilica (or early hall church) was built.
- In the first half of the 14th century, the structure was remodelled or expanded in late Gothic style as a hall church of the Hessian-Westphalian form.
- In 1374, building began on the tower.
- In 1640, the tower and hall were demolished by explosion, collapse and fire after the church was occupied by Imperial troops under Piccolomini.
- From 1645 to 1746 the church was being built anew, as it says on the stone plaque on the tower above the gallery.
- In 1709 the tower watchman's dwelling was built.
- In 1893 an endowment made possible the fitting of a choir window depicting the Homberg Synod.
- Since 1965, the church has been given its current shape through the removal of building done from the 17th to 19th centuries (pews, pulpit, galleries). A cloister has also been built.

Kirchhofslinde ("Churchyard linden") Before the church stands a linden tree that is more than 730 years old. Together with the church, the tree makes for a picturesque tableau over the marketplace. The poet Heinrich Ruppel dedicated the poem "Die Kirchhofslinde in Homberg" to the tree as his way of thanking those who had made donations for the tree's preservation after it had been burnt by a fire in its hollow. Also, Erich Kaiser, a "homeland researcher" (Heimatforscher) and writer, often mentioned the veteran tree in his writings.

Stalls, furniture van and house under the Kirchhofslinde In the spaces under the churchyard, stalls were built to serve as sales stands for butchers and bakers, as well as to serve as cookshops or meat storage.

At the former place of the so-called baker's stall, demolished in early 1820, a newer and notable building was built that Hombergers call the Möbelwagen ("Furniture Van").

The building next to the church to the right was built on the rubble of the former cookshop in 1719.

Rathaus (Town Hall) This was built in 1704 on the foundations of a former building built in the 15th century and destroyed in the Thirty Years' War. The tower was built after the Seven Years' War. The weather vane is from 1767. Since 1989, there has been a carillon. Beside the Gothic entrance at the stairway to Obertorstraße is the Homberger Elle (Homberg Ell), a mediaeval unit of measurement 57.4 cm (22.6 in) long. Its importance reaches as far as Thuringia.

Remodelled in 1875 was the Simbelschanze ("Simpleton Lair"; Simbel is a Hessian dialect word) before the town hall. Its name comes from a tax levied the same year. The government had approved a tax on simpletons to cover rising expenditures.

Engel-Apotheke This was built in 1668 on the site of a former house, and is the biggest timber-frame house on the marketplace. Since 1701 it has been a pharmacy.

Fünffenster-Haus ("Five-Windowed House") In the early 19th century, a window tax was imposed, and so windows were limited to five on each floor.

Kyffhäuser-Museum This has permanent exhibits with the emphasis on the Kyffhäuserbund, an old warriors' association.

Krone ("Crown") This is a timber-frame house from 1480. Since 1721 it has been a guesthouse. The beams and roofwork are noteworthy. The bay windows were built in the 16th century.

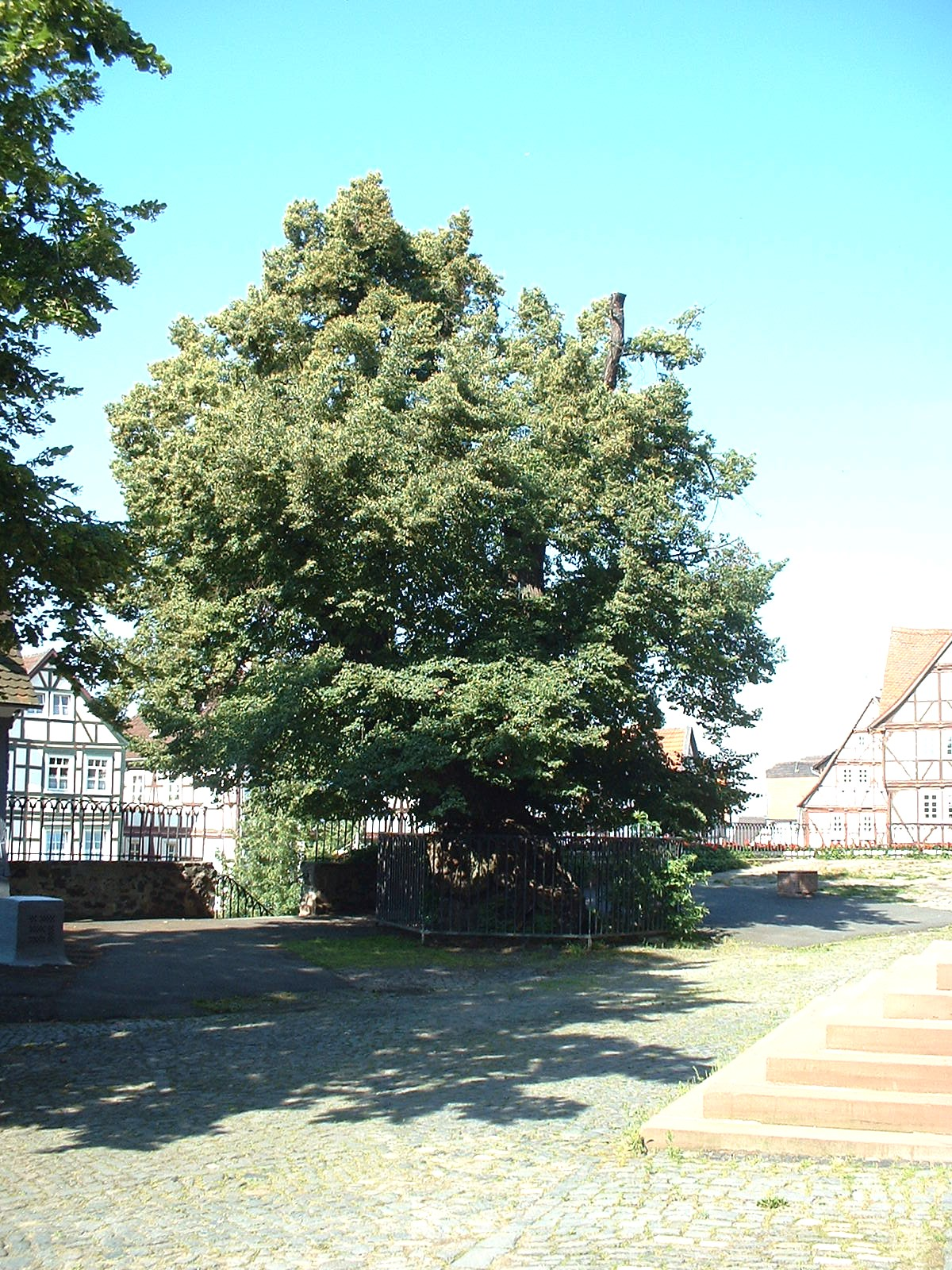
Churchyard linden tree – a veteran of about 730 years

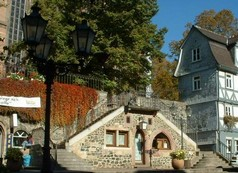
View of the stalls and the churchyard steps

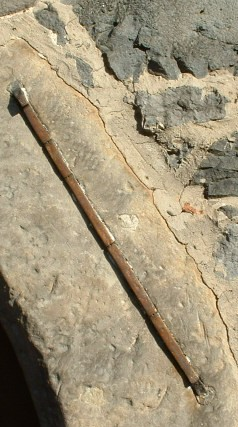
Homberg Ell

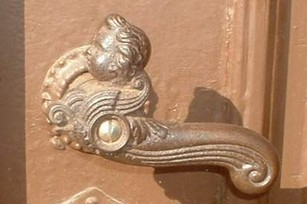
Door handle on a house at the marketplace

Geburtshaus des Heimatdichters Ludwig Mohr (House where the homeland poet Ludwig Mohr was born) This may be found on the south side of the marketplace. He wrote the novel Rot-Weiß ("Red-White") whose theme was the Dörnberg Uprising.

Weißer Hof This is a Renaissance timber-frame house. Noteworthy is the adornment with saltires.

Löwenhaus (Lion's House) This was built in 1617. A stone showing a coat of arms can be found here showing a staff, a snake and a lion's head with the inscription L.A.1664. It is known as the Ofenstein ("Oven Stone"). This site of the Löwenapotheke ("Lion's Pharmacy") also has a Renaissance porch worth seeing.

Old schoolhouse or Opfermannhaus, barracks Built in 1750 as a residential house for the sexton (Opfermann) of the neighbouring church, the building also served as the town's first school. Right nearby is a Gothic building formerly used as barracks for the Hessian Jäger Battalion.

Hochzeitshaus (Wedding House) Built in 1552, after the old town hall burnt down, it was used as the so-called new town hall. Later it was a rectory, a school and an administration building, but since 1952 it has housed the Heimatmuseum der Stadt Homberg (Homeland Museum of the Town of Homberg).

Pförtchen ("Little Gateway") This was the original pedestrian access to the castle.

Baumbachscher Burgsitz Built in 1543 as the castle seat, it lies right on the town wall. From 1840 to 1855 it was let to the deaf-and-dumb institution, and since 1873 it has been owned by the Evangelical Lutheran parish.

Dörnbergtempel Built on the foundations of the old Bächtenturm (tower), it was the meeting place for the plotters of the Dörnberg Uprising in 1809.

'Haus Leimbach This is a noteworthy corner house with a Gothic entrance.

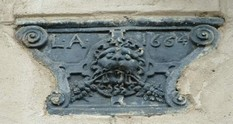
Ofenstein at the Löwenhaus with the letters L and A for Löwenapotheke, and the year 1648

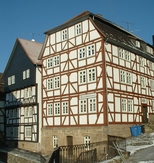
Old schoolhouse, before it at left a Gothic building which housed the Hessian Jäger Battalion

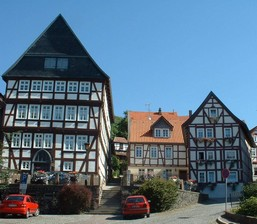
Hochzeitshaus

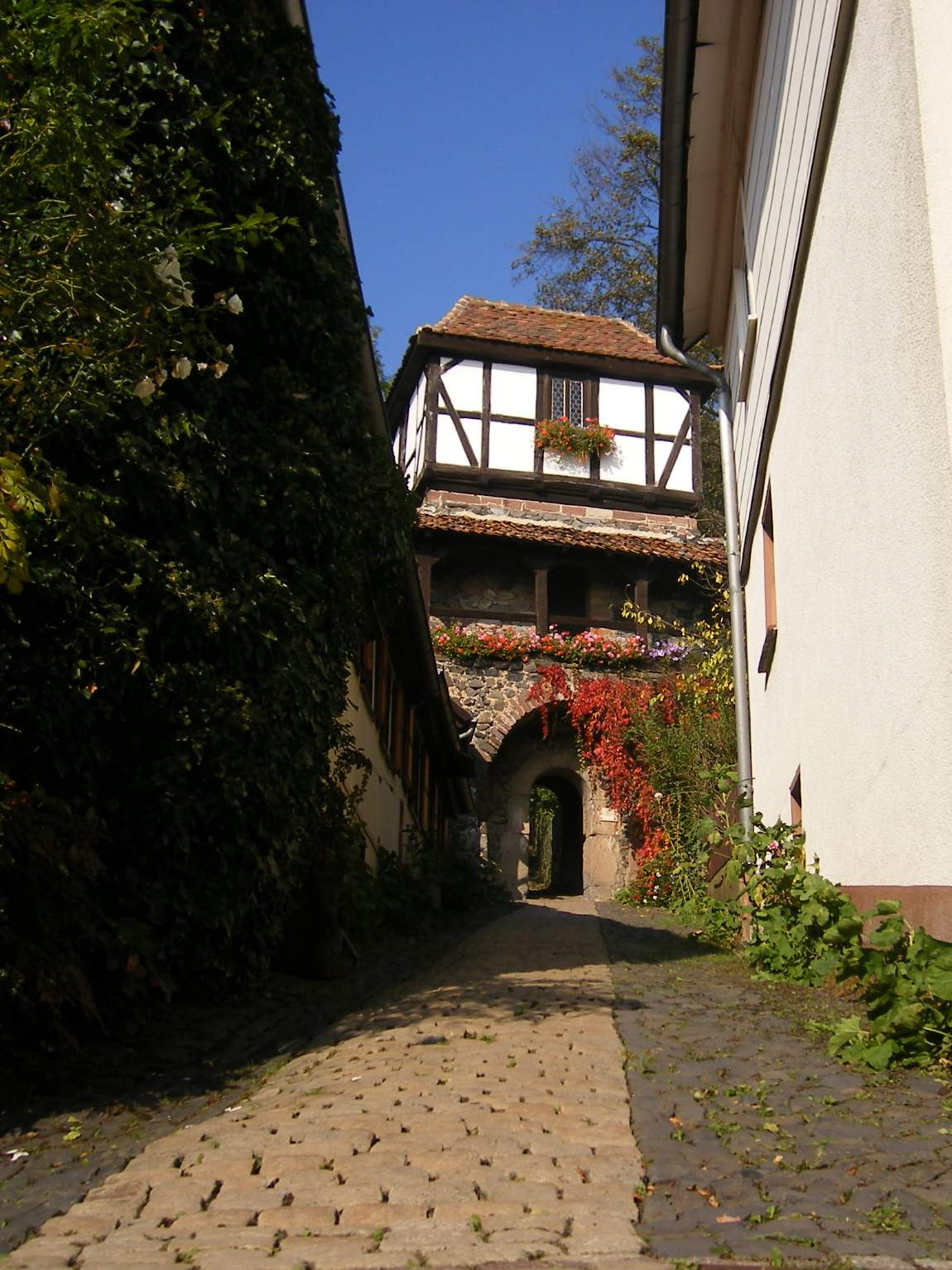
"Pförtchen"

Bischofsches Haus This was the ancestral seat of the wool-trading Bischof family. It was built on the ruins of another building destroyed in the Thirty Years' War. It has Renaissance bay windows, and the Bardeleben and Bischof coat of arms.

Haus Klüppel Until 1891, this was the seat of Homberg's Landrat. On the side facing Bischofstraße, sandstone figures may be found at the former entrance to a neighbouring house's cellar.

Ehemaliges Brauhaus (former brewhouse) In the town's archives are various descriptions from the homeland researcher Kaiser for the brewhouse at the corner of Untergasse and Entengasse. In 1665, people spoke of the little brewhouse at which there was a fountain. As of 1730, there were reports of the old or lower brewhouse, since a newer brewhouse had been built. In 1676 the house was partly destroyed by fire. With the introduction of trade freedom, brewers lost their exclusive rights to their trade. The town gave the brewhouse over to a leaseholder named Zickendraht, who was still brewing beer 15 years later. Other owners were also named, such as wainwright Wilhelm Ulrich. In 1918, he sold the house to a carter named Aubel, who converted it into a residential house of the form that can still be seen today.

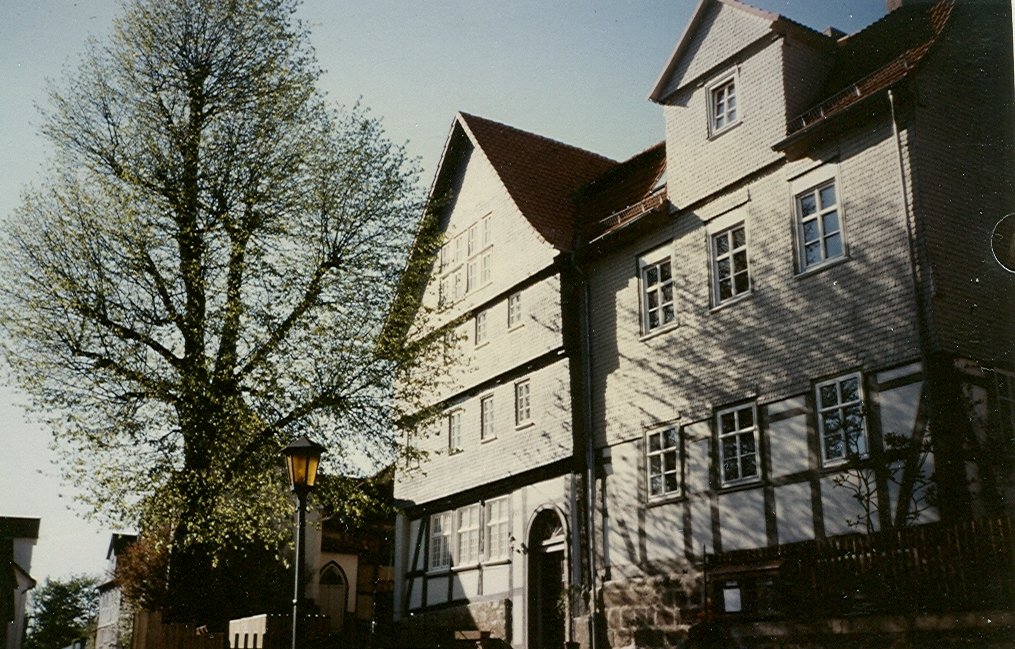
former castle seat, nowadays the Evangelical Lutheran Church's guesthouse

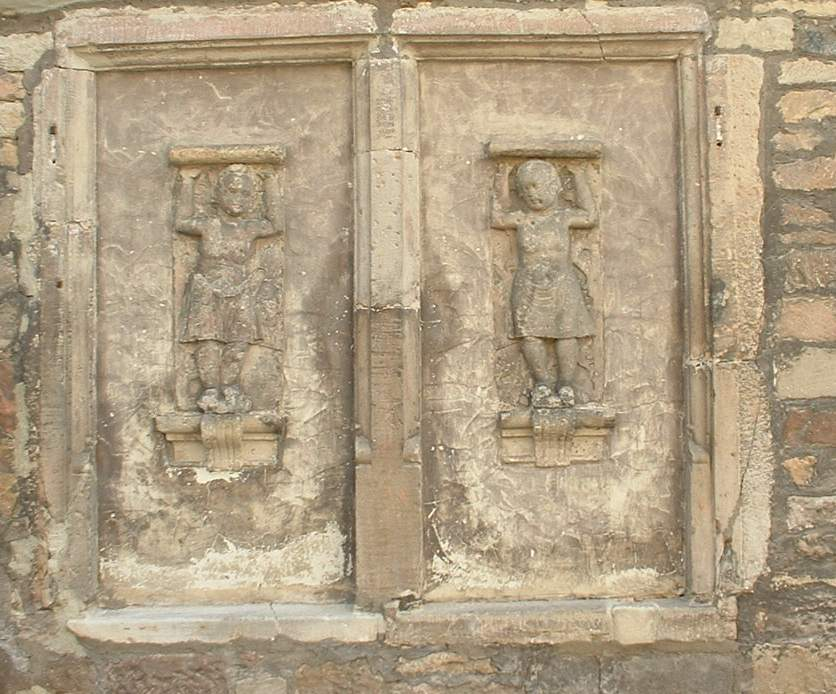
Sandstone figures

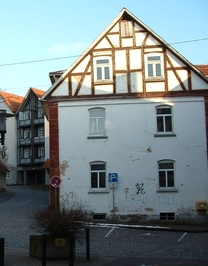
Homberg's former lower brewhouse

Alter Friedhof (Old Graveyard) This had been a burying ground since 1580, but is now parkland where some of the grave markers, belonging to various Hombergers, are well worth seeing. Among these are those belonging to Minister Julius Rhode, Mayor Winter, and Professor Wilhelm Volckmar. Also to be found there are graves containing the remains of Abbesses Marianne vom und zum Stein and Charlotte von Gilsa, and Justice of the Peace Martin, all of whom played key parts in the preparations for the Dörnberg Uprising against Jérôme Bonaparte in 1809.

Christus-Epheta-Kirche Consecrated in 1957, it is planned in circular form with the altar in the middle. It has a three-level dome over the apse. The 12 windows on the right side stand for the Twelve Apostles. The church tower is 30 m high. The mosaic design is by Gerhard Dechant: Christus heilt zwei taubstumme Kinder – This training centre existed in freedom for 44 years in this building. The great red-brick building was amply built and was said at the time to be the most modern building of its kind in Prussia. The building consisted of a broad middle section that housed classrooms, subject rooms, an assembly hall and the administration. InChrist heals two deaf-and-dumb children.

Ehemaliges Lehrerseminar (Former Teachers' College) Below Bindeweg, the Prussian government had the Royal Teachers' College built in 1879. the side wings lived the director and several college teachers. In 1925, the college was dissolved, and the building then served as a building school. Nowadays the whole building complex is used by the Bundespräsident-Theodor-Heuss-Gymnasium.

Die Freiheit This part of the town was founded by Landgrave Henry II in 1356, and was separated from the rest of the town by the town wall enclosing the Old Town. It had its own mayor, town hall, church and fortifications. Its independence came to an end in 1536 with its amalgamation with Homberg.

Das Neue Tor (The New Gate) This was built in 1536 when Die Freiheit was established to afford access between the two towns.

Wallensteinsches Stiftsgebäude This building was built about 1550, and as of 1616 was the castle seat. In 1783 came the endowment from the Wallenstein Convent (Wallensteinscher Damenstift). In the wake of the failed Dörnberg Uprising in 1832, the convent had to move to Fulda, whereafter the building became a residence for the pedagogues from the teachers' college.

Hospital zum Heiligen Geist Endowed in 1368 by the priest Heinrich Bischof in aid of the poor and sick.

Pulverturm (Powder Tower) This is the only fully preserved tower of the town's old fortifications, which were formerly some 1 200 m long with seven towers. The town wall reached a height of 6 to 8 m and was on average 2 m thick.

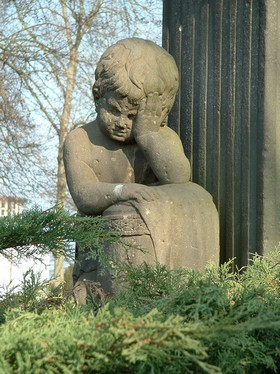
Historic grave marker

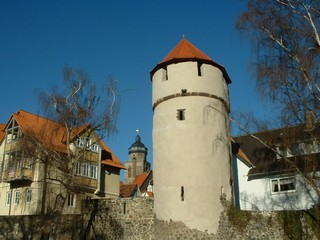
Pulverturm

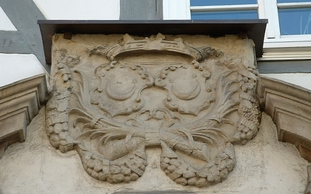
Baumbach arms stone

Gotisches Haus (Gothic House) This is Homberg's oldest residential house, having been built about 1425.

House on Holzhäuser Str. at the corner of Webergasse This was built in the 16th century. On the wall facing Webergasse is a sandstone sculpture of an angel with a sword. The sculpture comes from the old Amt court.

Former Jewish prayer room Also on Webergasse is a building that once housed a prayer room for the town's Jews.

Baumbachscher Burgsitz at the Upper Gate Above the entranceway here is a family coat of arms with a recumbent half-moon and two stars. The building underwent alterations in bygone ages.

Windmühle (Windmill) This is to be found at some former town fortification works near where the Holzhäusertor (gate) once was.

Stadthalle Built in 1909-1911 as the Restaurant Stadtpark, this building underwent restoration after decades of changing uses, and since 1991 it has been used as a municipal hall. It has been awarded the Hessian Monument Protection Prize, and is known for its noteworthy Art Nouveau architecture.

Hermann-Schafft-Schule (school) This is a school for the deaf and hearing-impaired. The building was dedicated in 1912 and is still used now.

Hohlebach-Mühle (mill) First mentioned in 1415, the mill was restored in 1992. The water wheel is 5 m across.

Side building from the late Middle Ages This is a building used for agricultural or trade purposes in the late Middle Ages. The house lies on a lane between Pfarrstraße and Berggasse with the gable facing the latter. The house's framework, which has not yet been dendrochronologically dated, points to the second half of the 15th century. There once was a similar building in Marburg, but it has fallen to the wrecker's ball.

The floors were used as storerooms. The ground floor is split into two halves of the same size by a middle wall that was built much later. The upstairs and attic have no inner walls at all, and there is no evidence that they ever did. The building has three entrances: a door in the east side onto the ground floor from the garden, a door opposite that leading into the street, both on the house's "eaves" sides, and another door in the north gable side leading to the upstairs. The attic is reached by ladder.

The spaces between the beams in the upper gable still have their original clay netting forming the cores of the walls. On the outer side, three-sided holes were pressed into the still soft outer layer of clay with a pointed trowel in an artform called Schuppenputz. There is also a house, built in 1452, in Bad Hersfeld that also has this original work dating from the late Middle Ages.

Westheimer Torturm (Gate Tower) On 18 July 2005, while building work was being done, one of the old Westheim Gate Tower's foundations was unearthed. On a base of basalt stones, smoothly hewn sandstone or tuff was fixed. That this is the old gate tower's foundation is not in doubt, and the strength of the foundation bespeaks a formidable structure.

Wells and cisterns While Westheimer Straße was being renovated in 2006, two long lost and forgotten examples of Homberg's historical water supply were rediscovered and reconstructed. The picture shows the so-called Radbrunnen ("wheel well") in the foreground at left, and up at the Besenmarkt (Broom Market), an old water cistern can quite clearly be seen.

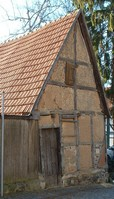
Mediaeval farm building

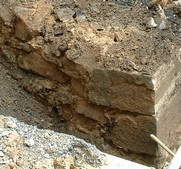
Westheimer Torturm

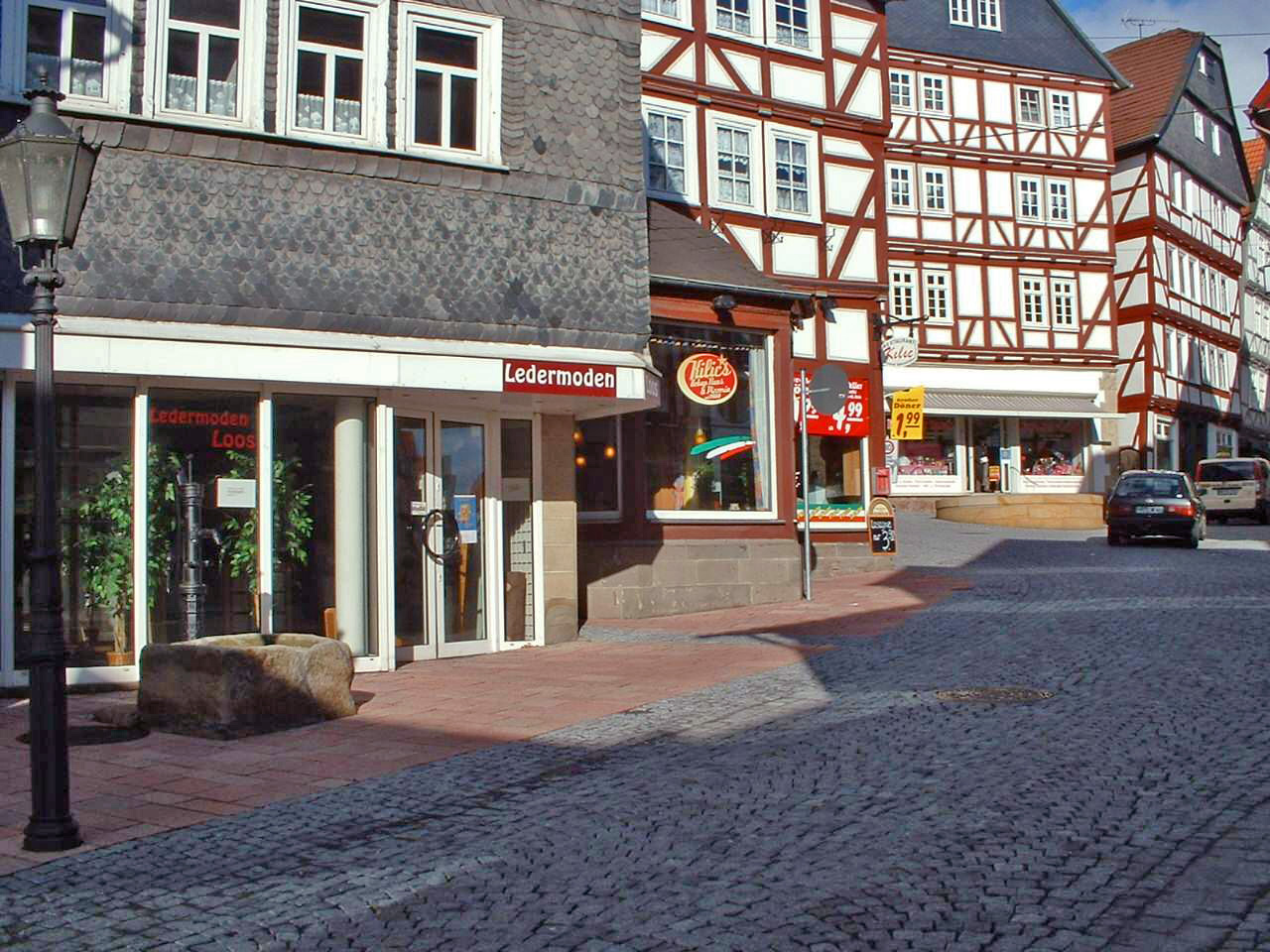
View of Westheimer Straße with two rediscovered examples of Homberg's historical water supply

St. Wendel In 1247, south of the town at the foot of the Schmückeberg (mountain) lay the Sondersiechenhaus St. Wendelin ("St. Wendelin Special Sickhouse") with a chapel and a mill. The last time when a leper is known to have been there was 1652. The building later served as a plague house and a homeless shelter. The crumbling building complex was torn down in 1786. This leper colony belonged to a network of all together 68 places and 71 colonies evenly scattered all over what is today Hesse.

Artworks On 19 May 2005 on Wallstraße in Homberg, a collaborative work by Christina Fiand and Ernst Groß was put up. The artwork, called Die Stelzengänger ("The Stilt Walkers") is a commissioned work by the Town of Homberg and the Kraftstrombezugsgenossenschaft (KBG; Electrical Supply Coöperative). Three figures on stilts more than six metres high peer curiously over the town wall on Wallstraße.

The three carved figures are meant to awaken passersby's curiosity about Homberg and get them to have a look behind the town's walls. The same artist created another artwork before the Schwalm-Eder district offices above the Old Graveyard park.

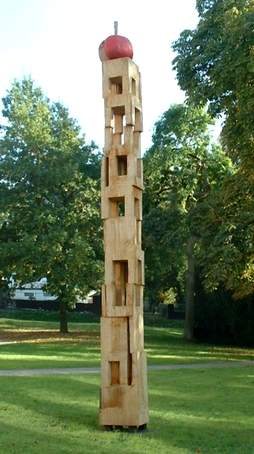

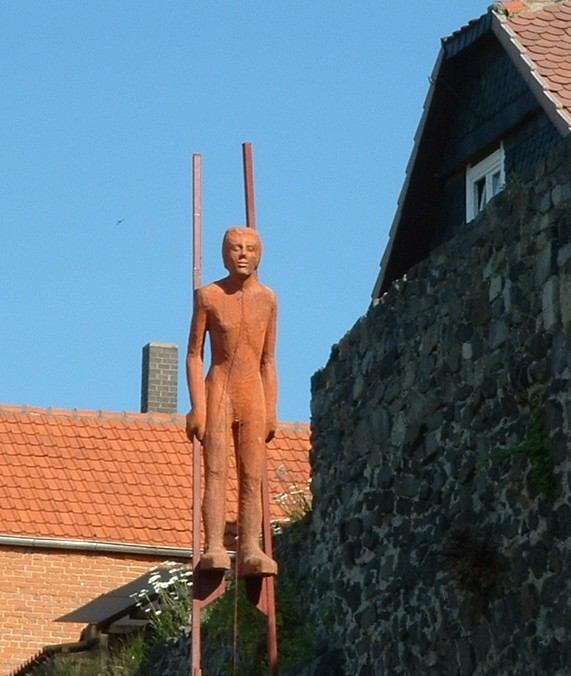

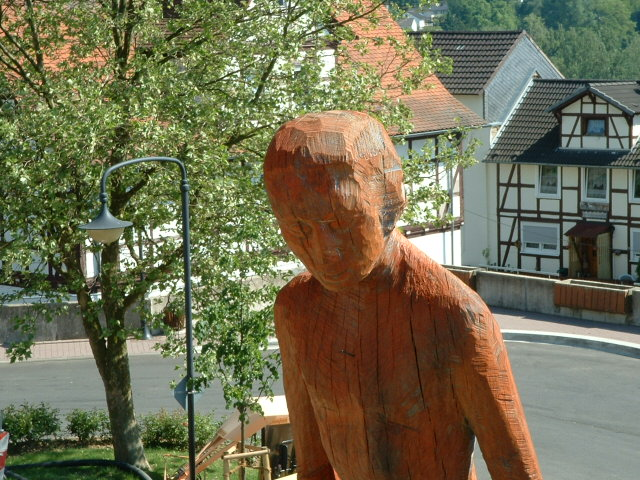

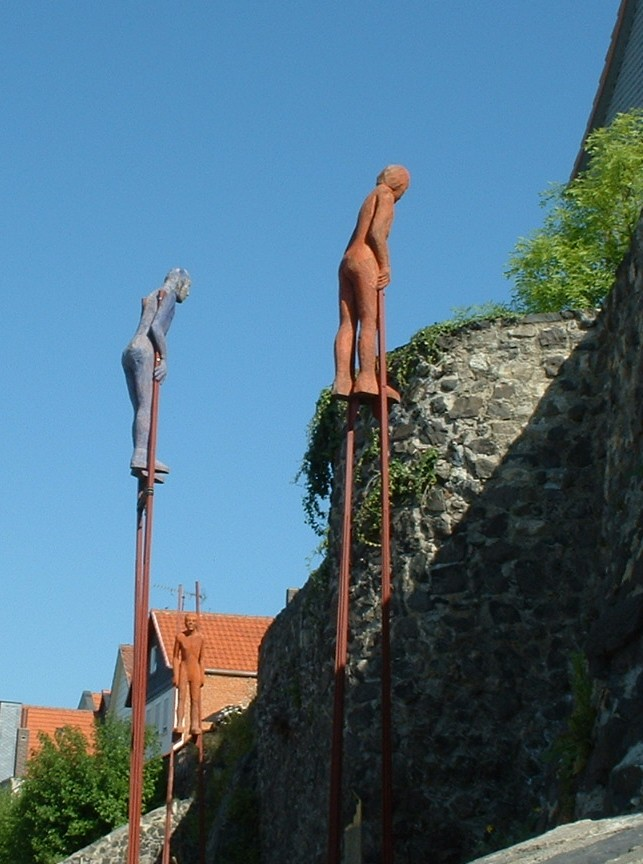
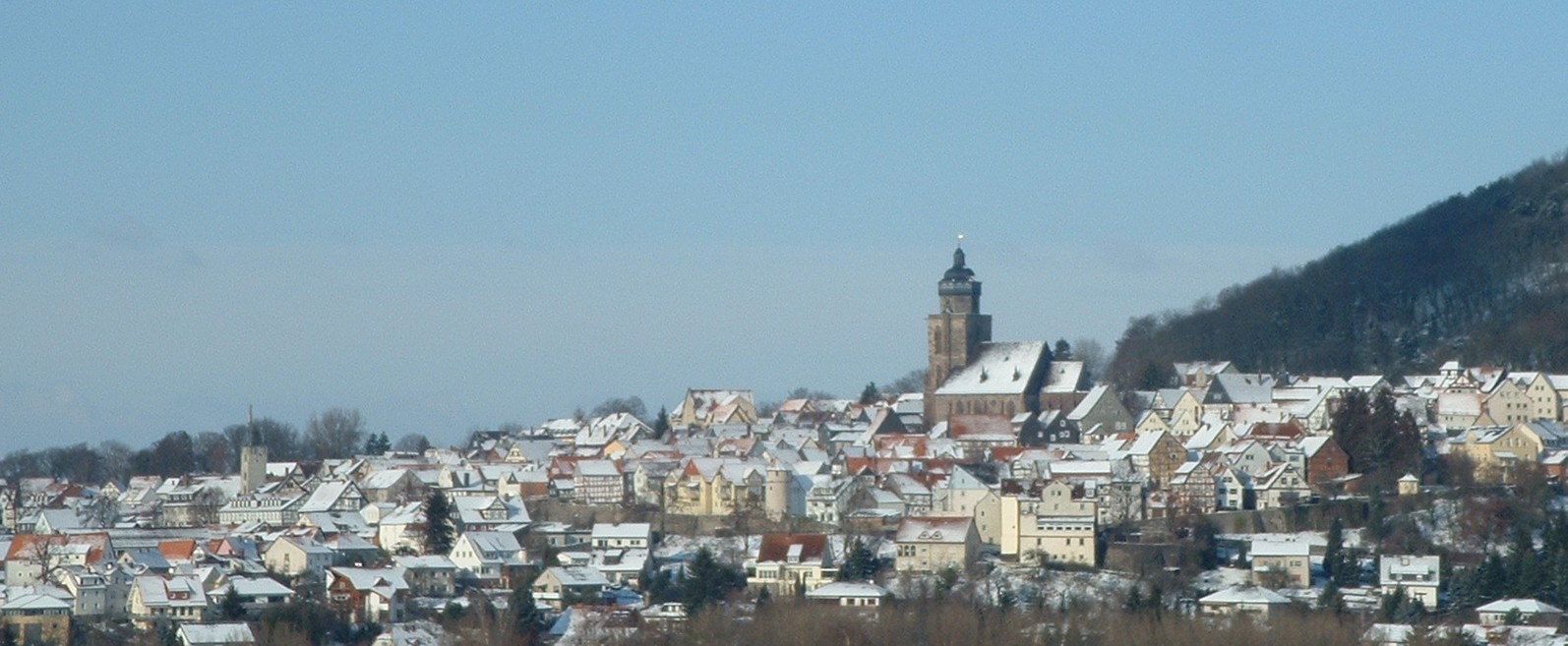
Homberg's Old Town in winter

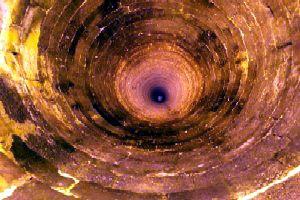
View down the castle well

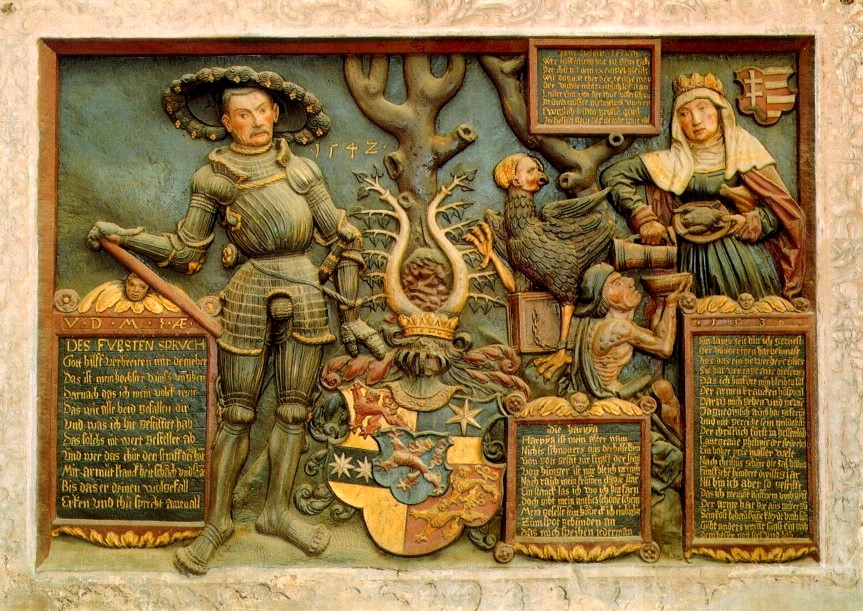
Landgrave Philip in a stone relief in the Haina monastery church

== Transport ==
Homberg belongs to the North Hesse Transport Network, which provides bus transport to the town.

Homberg is sometimes said to be the only district seat in Germany that is not on the railway network, but several other such towns exist, for example in Bavaria.

== People associated with the town ==
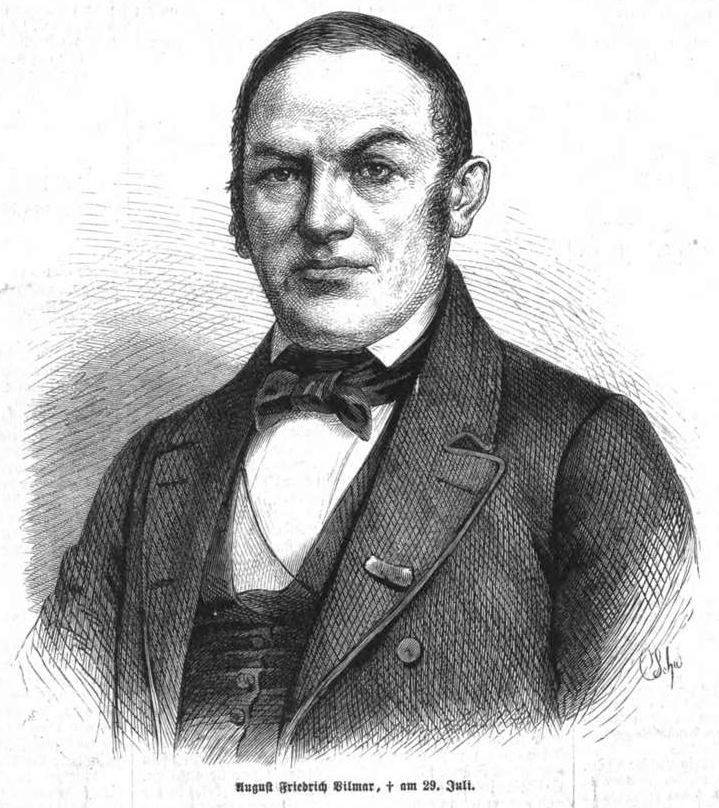
August Vilmar in 1868

- Konrad Mutian (1470–1526), humanist
- Hans Staden (1525–1576), mercenary and founder of the Brazilian research
- August Vilmar (1800–1868), theologian
- Max Hoffmann (1869–1927), diplomat and general
- Theodor Burchardi (1892–1983), naval officer, last admiral in the Second World War
- Heinz Jost (1904–1964), SS brigadier, Generalmajor of the police, war criminal
- Günter Abel (born 1947), philosopher
- Ulrich Holbein (born 1953), writer, lives near Allmuthshausen
- Matthias Reim (born 1957), singer
- Felicitas Woll (born 1980), an actress
- Tobias Damm (born 1983), footballer
