= Hans Hickmann =

German ethnomusicologist (1908-1968

Hans Robert Hermann Hickmann (Roßlau, German Reich, 19 May 1908; Blandford Forum, England, 4 September 1968) was a German ethnomusicologist. After settling in Egypt in 1933, he published research on the country's traditional music and the organology of Ancient Egypt.

== Life and career ==
Hickmann studied at the Humboldt University of Berlin with Curt Sachs and Erich von Hornbostel and graduated in 1934. He also was a conductor and played the piano and organ. During a visit to the Siwa Oasis in Egypt in 1932 and 1933, Hickmann began his research on Egyptian folk music, settling in Egypt in 1933. In September 1935, Hickmann married his German academic colleague Brigitte Schiffer. Their wedding took place in Nicosia, Cyprus, because the German consulate in Cairo had refused to register the marriage of a German-Jewish “mixed marriage”. In 1938, the couple separated – according to Schiffer and Hickmann in the wake of a forced divorce by the People’s Court in Nazi Germany.

Hickmann specialized in the music and organology of Ancient Egypt, as well as in the country's traditional folk music. Among other topics, he wrote for the Grove Dictionary of Music and Musicians about the tradition of cheironomy as practiced in Ancient Egypt and still found in Coptic music.

Hickmann also operated a conservatory called Musica Viva, located at 1 Seket el Fadl in downtown Cairo. One of his students was the Egyptian composer Rifaat Garrana.

== Literature ==
=== Books by Hans Hickmann ===
- Hickmann, Hans (1980). Miscellanea musicologica (Vies et travaux). Organization des antiquites de l'Egypte, Service des musees. ISBN 977-02-0334-3. ISBN 978-977-02-0334-7.

=== Articles by Hans Hickmann ===
- Hickmann, Hans. "Un Zikr dans le Mastaba de Debhen, Guîzah (IVème Dynastie)." Journal of the International Folk Music Council, v. 9 (1957), pp. 59–62. (in French)
- Hickmann, Hans. "La chironomie dans l'Egypte ancienne." Zeitschrift fur ägyptische Sprache und Altertumkunde, vol. 83, no. 2 (1958). (in French)
