= Heidegger on Concepts, Freedom and Normativity =

2014 book by Sacha Golob

Heidegger on Concepts, Freedom, and Normativity
- Cover
- Authors: Sacha Golob
- Language: English
- Subject: Martin Heidegger
- Publisher: Cambridge University Press
- Publication date: 2014
- Publication place: United Kingdom
- Media type: Print (Hardcover and Paperback)
- Pages: 282
- ISBN: 9781107031708

Heidegger on Concepts, Freedom, and Normativity is a 2014 book by the philosopher Sacha Golob, in which the author provides an account of the arguments and concepts characterizing the philosopher Martin Heidegger's early thought and examines their positions both in contemporary analytic philosophy and the history of philosophy. He argues against existing interpretations of Heidegger on intentionality and believes that Heidegger emphasizes a unique position regarding conceptual and representational content.
