= Rifaat Garrana =

Egyptian composer (1929–2017)

- Born: January 29, 1929; Cairo
- Died: April 2, 2017 (aged 88)
- Occupations: Composer; Conductor; Chapelmaster; Musician

Mohamed Rifaat Garrana (Arabic: محمد رفعت جرانة; surname also spelled Garana, 29 January 1929 – 2 April 2017) was an Egyptian composer of classical music, a member of that nation's second generation of such composers.

Garrana was born in Cairo on 29 January 1929. He began playing the trumpet at age 12, studying it later at the Institute for Dramatic Music. He later studied with Hans Hickmann and Menato in Cairo.

His works feature the juxtaposition of Egyptian traditional and religious music with Western music. He has composed orchestral works (including several symphonic poems). His concerto for qanun and orchestra is the first composition to combine this Arabic instrument with symphony orchestra.

In addition to his compositional activities, he served as director of the music division of Egyptian television.

His daughter, the flutist Maha Garrana, has performed his music.

Rifaat Garrana died on 2 April 2017, at the age of 88.

== Compositions ==
- Oriental Dance, flute and string orchestra
- Concerto for Qanun and Orchestra
- Port Said - A Symphonic Poem
- The Nile - A Symphonic Poem
- Fugue for Clarinet and Strings
- Meditations from "El Nouba"

== See also ==
- List of Egyptian composers
