= Keiko Kawashima =

Japanese historian of science

Keiko Kawashima (Japanese: 川島慶子; born 1959) is a Japanese historian of science whose research has focused on women in science and gender in science. She is a professor emerita at the Nagoya Institute of Technology.

== Education and career ==
Kawashima was born in Kobe in 1959. After a bachelor's degree from Kyoto University in 1983, and a master's degree in 1987 from the University of Tokyo, she traveled to France for continued study at the School for Advanced Studies in the Social Sciences, and received a diplôme d'études approfondies in 1991.

She joined the Nagoya Institute of Technology as an assistant professor in 1994, and was promoted to associate professor in 1996 and full professor in 2014. She retired as a professor emerita in 2023.

== Publications ==
Kawashima's writings in the history of science include works in Japanese, French, and English. She is the author of a book in French, Émilie du Châtelet et Marie-Anne Lavoisier, Science et genre au XVIII siècle (Paris: Honoré Champion, 2013), and of two books in Japanese. She also translated Roald Hoffmann's play Something That Belongs to You into Japanese.

Her home page links several short manga outlining the lives and works of women in science.

== Recognition ==
Kawashima was the 2006 recipient of the Women’s History 'Aoyama Nao' Award of the Institute for Research on Women and Gender of Tokyo Woman's Christian University, given for the 2005 Japanese edition of her book on Émilie du Châtelet and Marie-Anne Paulze Lavoisier. She was the 2010 recipient of the Yamazaki Award.
