= Wilhelm Volckmar =

Wilhelm Valentin Volckmar (26 December 1812, Hersfeld - 27 August 1887, Homberg (Efze) ) was a German organ virtuoso, seminar music teacher and composer.

== Life ==
He received his musical training from his father, Adam Valentin Volckmar (1770–1851). He was a student of Johann Gottfried Vierling, who in turn had received his training from Johann Philipp Kirnberger. Volckmar thus, in a broader sense, came from the school of Bach 's grandchildren.

In 1835 he became a music teacher in a seminar in Homberg (Efze) in northern Hesse, where his grave can still be found today and where a street is named after him. He quickly became famous as an organ virtuoso and was awarded the title of Dr. honoris causa in 1846 and a professor in 1886. From 1861 onwards he undertook extensive concert tours as a valued organ virtuoso. During his lifetime Volckmar was famous as an organist, particularly for his masterly pedal playing, but also as an improviser and theorist. From today's musicological point of view his pedal technique is extraordinary because, as has now been revised, he was the first person to use four-part pedal playing in his Organ Symphony Op. 172 (4th movement, Intermezzo). He maintained friendly relations with Franz Liszt, whose symphonic organ style also clearly influenced his own compositional style, and with the composer Louis Spohr. He was also well acquainted with the well-known organ-building theorist Johann Gottlob Töpfer. Volckmar was a member of the Freemasons ' Association.

== Works ==
As a composer, Volckmar was extremely prolific, writing for many ensembles. Notable works include his 20 organ sonatas, two large organ symphonies, a fantasy and fugue on themes from Beethoven's 9th Symphony, a theory of harmony (1860), a handbook of music (1885), a large organ method, a method for violin, a fluency method for the organ, folk song arrangements for piano, and also many (particularly church) vocal works. Volckmar also made a name for himself as an editor of numerous organ works by old and new masters, and he was the editor of the first complete edition of Mendelssohn's organ works.
