= Günter Abel =

German philosopher (born 1947)

- Born: 7 November 1947 (age 78); Homberg, Allied-occupied Germany

Education
- Education: University of Marburg; University of Lausanne

Philosophical work
- Institutions: Technische Universität Berlin
- Main interests: general philosophy of sign and interpretation Nietzsche

Günter Abel (born 7 November 1947) is a German philosopher and former professor for theoretical philosophy at Technische Universität Berlin (TU-Berlin).

Abel studied philosophy, history, romance studies and political science at the University of Marburg and the University of Lausanne. After finishing his PhD thesis on stoicism Abel habilitated in 1981 with a work on Friedrich Nietzsche. Since 1987 he is professor for theoretical philosophy at TU-Berlin. From 1999 to 2001 he was vice-president of TU-Berlin, from 2002 to 2005 he was president of the German Society of Philosophy (DGPhil). Since 2008 he is board member of the International Federation of Philosophical Societies (FISP, Fédération Internationale des Sociétés de Philosophie).

Abel developed the so-called "general philosophy of sign and interpretation", which holds that language, thinking, action and knowledge are fundamentally tied to the practice of interpretation and use of signs. All aspects of life, from perception to reflection to action, are characterised as interpretative and constructional and constituted by signs. Reality thus depends on systems of description, symbols and interpretations. Consequently, Abel holds that the idea of an uninterpreted reality turns out to be wrong. According to the constitutive role of interpretation he refers to "worlds of interpretation" (in reference to Nelson Goodmans "ways of worldmaking"). Based on this premise Abel advances a three-step model of relations of signs and interpretation, which he applies in different fields of philosophy.

He published about topics of epistemology, philosophy of mind, philosophy of knowledge and science ("knowledge research"), philosophy of language, theory of symbols, philosophy of perception, ethics, theory of creativity and philosophy of art.

Abel is a noted Nietzsche scholar who tries to combine elements of Nietzsche's philosophy with methods of contemporary analytic philosophy. He focusses mainly on Nietzsche's epistemology, which had a strong influence on his own philosophy of interpretation.
