= Lisa Shapiro =

American philosopher

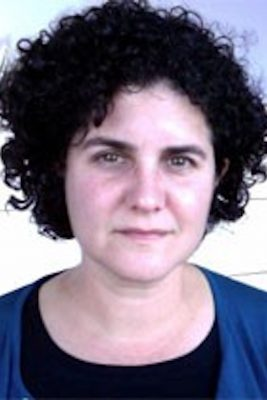
- Born: Maryland, USA

Education
- Education: Wesleyan University (B.A.); University of Pittsburgh (Ph.D.)
- Thesis: The union of soul and body: Descartes' conception of a human being (1997)

Philosophical work
- Era: 21st-century philosophy
- Region: Western philosophy
- School: Early modern philosophy
- Institutions: Simon Fraser University
- Main interests: Cartesian philosophy
- Website: http://lisacshapiro.wordpress.com/

Lisa C. Shapiro (born 1967) is an American and Canadian philosopher, Professor and the Dean of Faculty of Arts at McGill University. She is known for her expertise on early modern philosophy.

Shapiro is the first winner of the German Elisabeth of Bohemia Prize which celebrates the history of women in philosophy. It is awarded to internationally recognized philosophers for outstanding services to research on women in the history of philosophy.

== Books ==
- Pleasure: A History (ed.), Oxford University Press, 2018
- Emotion and Cognitive Life in Medieval and Early Modern Philosophy, edited with Martin Pickavé, Oxford University Press, 2012
- The correspondence between Elisabeth, Princess of Bohemia and Descartes, University of Chicago Press, 2007
