= Lexikon verfolgter Musiker und Musikerinnen der NS-Zeit =

German musical encyclopedia

The Lexikon verfolgter Musiker und Musikerinnen der NS-Zeit (LexM) is an online encyclopedia of the University of Hamburg, which has been developed as a work in progress since 2005.

== Publication/contents ==
The editors today are Sophie Fetthauer and Peter Petersen as well as Claudia Maurer Zenck (dormant). The LexM is located at the centre Musik und Diktatur as part of the Institute for Historical Musicology at the University of Hamburg. The LexM was initially founded by the Deutsche Forschungsgemeinschaft then funded by the Alfred Toepfer Foundation, the Alfried Krupp von Bohlen und Halbach Foundation, the Ernst von Siemens Music Foundation, the Mariann Steegmann Foundation, the Zeit Foundation and the Hamburg Ministry of Science and Research. It lists the professional musicians among the "victims of Nazi terror". The articles contain a biographical narrative as well as secured individual data on the biography; in addition, the primary and secondary sources available for it are listed. Images, music and sound material are also provided. The texts can be used for programmes, cover texts, etc. if the author and source are indicated. The use of complete articles requires the consent of the authors.

== Technology ==
An independent web application based on the MyCoRe function core was developed for the LexM. Data model, appearance and research options were adapted to the requirements of an online lexicon. The application is hosted at the Regional Computer Centre (RRZ) of the University of Hamburg.
