= Sacha Golob =

British philosopher

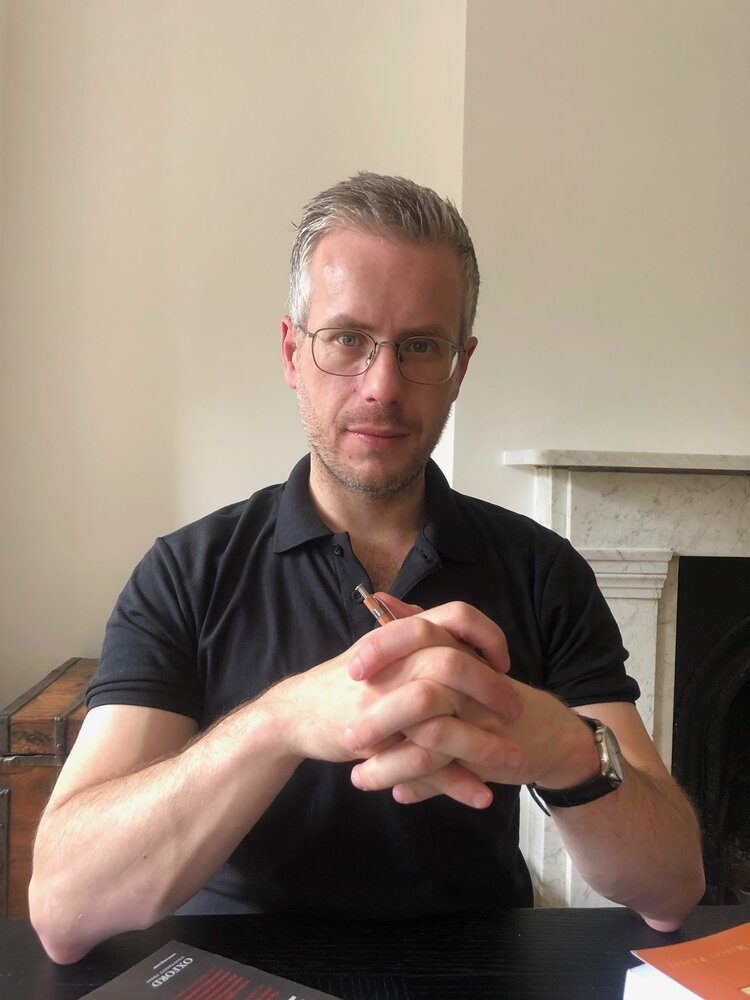
- Born: Sacha Yevgeny Golob; 19 October 1981 (age 44)

Education
- Education: University of Cambridge (PhD); University of Oxford (BPhil)
- Thesis: Intentionality, Freedom, Method: Theoretical and Practical Philosophy in Kant and Heidegger (2010)
- Doctoral advisor: Nick Jardine

Philosophical work
- Era: Contemporary philosophy
- Region: Western philosophy
- School: Continental
- Institutions: King's College London
- Main interests: German philosophy, 20th-century French philosophy, philosophy of art, moral philosophy
- Website: https://www.sachagolob.com/

Sacha Yevgeny Golob (born 19 October 1981) is a British philosopher and a Professor in the Department of Philosophy at King's College London. Golob is known for his expertise on French and German philosophy, in particular the work of Immanuel Kant and Martin Heidegger.

== Career ==
He is the current Co-Editor with Alix Cohen of the British Journal for the History of Philosophy and the Founder of the Centre for Philosophy and Art. Previously, he was a Research Fellow at Peterhouse, Cambridge.

== Books ==
- Heidegger on Concepts, Freedom, and Normativity, Cambridge University Press, 2014
- The Cambridge History of Moral Philosophy, co-editor with Jens Timmermann, Cambridge University Press, 2017
