= Helmut Huchzermeyer =

German musicologist and composer

Helmut Huchzermeyer (28 December 1904 – 1 March 1984) was a German philologist, musicologist and composer.

== Youth and education ==
Huchzermeyer was born in Klaswipper, today part of Wipperfürth in the Oberbergischer Kreis in the administrative district of Cologne, as the son of the Lutheran pastor Carl Huchzermeyer (1858-1929). He was educated at the Städtisches Gymnasium in Wipperfürth until his Abitur in 1924. Throughout his school years, he received solid training in organ, piano and violin playing as well as in theoretical subjects (including musical composition) from the seminar music teachers Georg Beringer and Alfons Schmetz at the teacher training college in Wipperfürth. Until 1929, he studied Latin, Greek and possibly religious education at the universities of Cologne, Marburg and Münster. At the same time, he studied musicology with Ernst Bücken (Cologne), Hermann Stephani (Marburg) and Fritz Volbach (Münster). The latter, coming from Wipperfürth, became his special mentor. In 1930, Huchzermeyer received his doctorate in Münster with a thesis on "Ancient Greek music Aulos and Kithara in Greek music until the end of the classical period" (printed 1931). This work is regarded as a standard work and is even today only outdated in a few points.

== Professional background and activities ==
After working as a teacher and assessor at various grammar schools, the problem arose in 1933 that there was no need for grammar school teachers (especially classical philologists). Only by working exclusively as a music teacher, most recently at the girls' secondary school in Osnabrück, did Huchzermeyer obtain a budget position as a student councilor. From 1940 to 1946, he was a soldier or in English captivity. From 1948, he was a student councillor at the Stiftisches Humanistisches Gymnasium Mönchengladbach, a boys' school, where he devoted himself to the old languages. In 1951, he was appointed to the Oberstudienrat and entrusted with the management of the Studienseminar. He now no longer gave music lessons, but put together a respectable school orchestra, which had been lacking until then, which he led until 1960 and which performed regularly on festive occasions and with its own concerts. At the same time, he founded a wind band. In the early years in Mönchengladbach, he again became interested in music of ancient Greece. One result was the setting to music of Antigone by Sophocles for choir (in the original language), speaker and large orchestra. The occasion was the celebration of the 75th anniversary of the Stiftisches Gymnasium as a full institution in 1952. Huchzermeyer retired in 1967. His compositional output, his first attempts at composition were made at the age of ten, comprises over 61 works in various genres. Sacred compositions make up about one third of his complete works. Huchzermeyer had been married to Charlotte, née Rüther (1915-1993) since 1935. The couple had two children, one son is the internist and musicologist Hans Huchzermeyer.

Huchzermeyer died in Minden at the age of 79 and is buried in Klaswipper.

== Publications ==
- Aulos und Kithara in der griechischen Musik bis zum Ausgang der klassischen Zeit (nach den literarischen Quellen). Emsdetten (Westf.) 1931.
- Die Bedeutung und Stellung der Musik in der griechischen Tragödie. In Festschrift 75 Jahre Stiftisches Humanistisches Gymnasium M. Gladbach. Mönchengladbach 1952, pp. 63–71.
- Zur Aufführung antiker Tragödien auf der modernen Bühne. In Neue Zeitschrift für Musik. Vol. 123, 1962, pp. 492–497.
- with Hans Huchzermeyer: Die Bedeutung des Rhythmus in der Musiktherapie der Griechen von der Frühzeit bis zum Beginn des Hellenismus. In Sudhoffs Archiv. Zeitschrift für Wissenschaftsgeschichte. Vol. 58, 1974, pp. 113–148.
- Luther und die Musik. In Luther. Zeitschrift der Luther-Gesellschaft. Vol. 39, 1968, pp. 14–25.
