= British Journal for the History of Philosophy =

- Discipline: History of philosophy
- Language: English
- Edited by: Alix Cohen, Sacha Golob

Publication details
- History: 1993–present
- Publisher: Taylor and Francis
- Frequency: Bimonthly
- Impact factor: 0.8 (2023)

Standard abbreviations
- ISO 4: Br. J. Hist. Philos.

Indexing
- ISSN: 0960-8788 (print); 1469-3526 (web)
- LCCN: sn94031676
- OCLC no.: 27747867

Links
- Journal homepage; Online access; Online archive

The British Journal for the History of Philosophy (BJHP) is a bimonthly peer-reviewed academic journal of the British Society for the History of Philosophy, publishing articles on the history of philosophy since 1993. It is widely regarded as one of the leading international journals in the area. It has played a central role in broadening the philosophical canon to include marginalised figures and traditions. From 2013 to 2020, the editor-in-chief was Michael A. Beaney, currently Regius Professor of Logic at the University of Aberdeen. From 2021, the editors-in-chief are Alix Cohen (Edinburgh) and Sacha Golob (King's College London).

It is published by the British Society for the History of Philosophy (BSHP), a charitable learned society founded in 1984 based on Kings College, with the aim of promoting the study and teaching of the history of philosophy, and which manages the British Journal for the History of Philosophy. The current home of the society is King's College London, and its current president is Professor Maria Rosa Antognazza.
