= Schopenhauer Society =

20th century literary and philosophical society

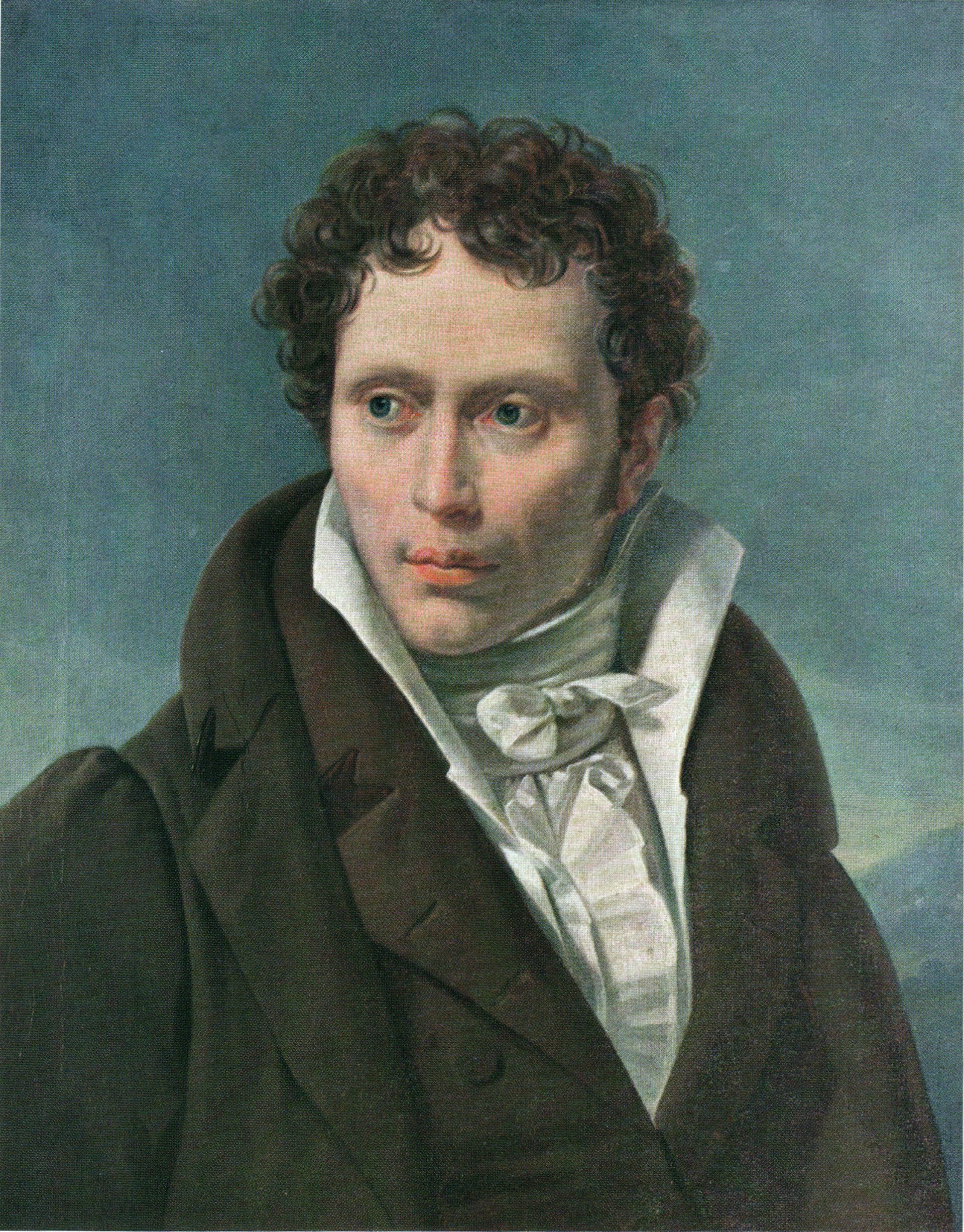
Arthur Schopenhauer

The Schopenhauer Society (German: Schopenhauer-Gesellschaft) is a literary and philosophical society devoted to research into the work, life and influence of the philosopher Arthur Schopenhauer (1788–1860). The society was founded in 1911 by the Sanskrit scholar, philosopher and orientalist Paul Deussen and has its seat in Frankfurt. Since 1912, the society has published the Journal of the Schopenhauer Society (German: Jahrbuch der Schopenhauer-Gesellschaft).

From the 1920s, the society became increasingly academic in its orientation, and it hosted major international academic congresses on "Europe and India" (Dresden 1927), "Philosophy and Religion" (Frankfurt 1929) and "Theory and Reality" (Hamburg 1931). The society saw a revival in the postwar era, with numerous congresses, seminars and lectures, in addition to the publication of its journal. It has sections in India, Brazil, Italy, Poland and Australasia. The society has around 600 members.

The presidents to date:

- Paul Deussen (1911–1919)
- Leopold Wurzmann (1920–1924)
- Hans Zint (1924–1936)
- Arthur Hübscher (1936–1982)
- Wolfgang Schirmacher (1982–1984)
- Rudolf Malter (1984–1992)
- Heinz Gerd Ingenkamp (1992–2000)
- Matthias Koßler (since 2000)
