= Claudia Maurer Zenck =

German musicologist (born 1948)

Claudia Maurer Zenck (born in 1948) is a German musicologist.

== Early life, family and education ==
She was born in Bremen.

She earned her promotion in 1974 (Note: Versuch über die wahre Art, Debussy zu analysieren) at Technische Universität Berlin and her habilitation (Note: Vom Takt. Untersuchungen zur Theorie und kompositorischen Praxis im ausgehenden 18. und beginnenden 19. Jahrhundert) in 2000 in Innsbruck.

== Career ==
Zenck taught from 2001 to 2013 as professor of Historical musicology at the University of Hamburg.

== Publications ==
- Versuch über die wahre Art, Debussy zu analysieren. Munich 1974, ISBN 3-87397-038-4.
- Ernst Krenek – ein Komponist im Exil. Vienna 1980, ISBN 3-85151-033-X.
- Vom Takt. Untersuchungen zur Theorie und kompositorischen Praxis im ausgehenden 18. und beginnenden 19. Jahrhundert. Vienna 2001, ISBN 3-205-99287-3.
- Così fan tutte. Dramma giocoso und deutsches Singspiel. Frühe Abschriften und frühe Aufführungen. Schliengen 2007, ISBN 978-3-931264-29-1.
