= List of African American philosophers =

This is an incomplete list of notable African American philosophers. For other African Americans, see Lists of African Americans.

- Anita L. Allen (born 1953), professor of law and philosophy at the University of Pennsylvania Law School
- William B. Allen (born 1944), political philosopher and politician
- Kwame Anthony Appiah (born 1954), professor of law and philosophy at New York University
- Molefi Kete Asante (born 1942), professor of Africology at Temple University
- Moya Bailey, professor at Northwestern University, coined misogynoir
- Thomas Nelson Baker Sr. (1860–1940), first African American to receive a PhD in philosophy in the United States
- Kathryn Sophia Belle (born 1978), professor of philosophy at Pennsylvania State University
- Patricia Hill Collins (born 1948), professor of sociology emerita at the University of Maryland
- Tommy J. Curry, professor of philosophy at the University of Edinburgh
- Angela Davis (born 1944), professor emerita at the University of California, Santa Cruz
- William Fontaine (1909–1968), professor at the University of Pennsylvania
- Cornelius Golightly (1917–1976), associate dean and professor of philosophy at Wayne State University
- Lewis Gordon (born 1962), professor of philosophy and Africana Studies at the University of Connecticut
- Delia Graff Fara (1969–2017), professor of philosophy at Princeton University
- Leonard Harris, professor of philosophy at Purdue University
- Patrick Francis Healy (1834–1910), president and professor of philosophy at Georgetown University
- Joy James (born 1958), professor of humanities at Williams College
- Alain LeRoy Locke (1885–1954), Harlem Renaissance leader and professor of philosophy at Howard University
- John H. McClendon, professor of philosophy at Michigan State University
- Michele Moody-Adams, professor of philosophy at Columbia University
- Anthony Sean Neal, professor of philosophy at Mississippi State University
- Huey P. Newton (1942–1989), co-founder of the Black Panther Party, PhD in social philosophy
- Adrian Piper (born 1948), conceptual artist and Kantian philosopher
- Camisha Russell, professor of philosophy at University of Oregon
- Tommie Shelby (born 1967), professor of African and African American studies and philosophy at Harvard University
- Thomas Sowell (born 1930), political philosopher and economist, Hoover Institution senior fellow
- Olúfẹ́mi O. Táíwò (born 1990), professor of philosophy at Georgetown University
- Ken Taylor (1954–2019), professor of philosophy at Stanford University
- Paul C. Taylor (born 1967), professor of philosophy at the University of California, Los Angeles
- Laurence Thomas (1949–2025), professor emeritus of philosophy and political science at Syracuse University
- Cornel West (born 1953), faculty at Union Theological Seminary
- George Yancy (born 1961), professor of philosophy at Emory University
- Naomi Zack, professor of philosophy at Lehman College

== See also ==
- Africana philosophy
- Collegium of Black Women Philosophers
- List of African-American non-fiction writers
