= George Yancy =

American philosopher (born 1961)

- Born: George Dewey Yancy; June 3, 1961 (age 65); Philadelphia, Pennsylvania, U.S.

Education
- Education: University of Pittsburgh, Yale University, New York University, Duquesne University
- Thesis: Whiteness and the return of the "Black body" (2005)
- Doctoral advisor: Fred Evans

Philosophical work
- School: Continental philosophy
- Institutions: Duquesne University; Emory University
- Main interests: Critical theory of race, critical whiteness studies, African American philosophy, philosophy of the body
- Website: www.georgeyancy.com

George Dewey Yancy (born June 3, 1961) is an American philosopher who is the Samuel Candler Dobbs Professor of Philosophy at Emory University. He is a distinguished Montgomery Fellow at Dartmouth College, one of the college's highest honors. In 2019–20, he was the University of Pennsylvania's Inaugural Provost's Distinguished Visiting Faculty Fellow. He is the editor of the book series "Philosophy of Race" at Bloomsbury Publishing. He is known for his work in critical whiteness studies, critical philosophy of race, critical phenomenology (especially racial embodiment), and African American philosophy, and has written, edited, or co-edited over 25 books. In his capacity as an academic scholar and a public intellectual, he has published over 250 combined scholarly articles, chapters, and interviews that have appeared in professional journals, books, and at various news sites.

Yancy has authored numerous essays and conducted interviews at both The New York Times' philosophy column "The Stone," and at Truthout, which is "a nonprofit news organization dedicated to providing independent reporting and commentary on a diverse range of social justice issues." While writing for The New York Times' philosophy column "The Stone," Yancy conducted a series of interviews on death (called Conversations on Death) through the lens of major religions (Buddhism, Judaism, Christianity, Islam, Jainism, Taoism, and the Yoruba religious tradition). The interview series also included an interview on atheism with philosopher Todd May. Yancy began the series with his own reflections on the meaning of death in an article titled, Facing the Fact of my Death. He continued the interviews on death through the lens of Sikhism, Hinduism, and Confucianism in a lengthy discussion titled, “Eastern Religions on Death and the Afterlife” at Tikkun.

At “The Stone,” he also conducted an influential series of interviews on the topic of race, including conversations with philosophers and public intellectuals Charles Mills, Judith Butler, Noam Chomsky, Cornel West, Peter Singer, bell hooks, Anthony Appiah, Joy James, and others. The series began with an engaging conversation with philosopher Naomi Zack on the themes of white privilege, Black embodiment, and the social construction of race. At Truthout, Yancy has continued his public-facing philosophical work through conducting interviews with philosophers and scholars across various disciplines, exploring such areas and themes as disability studies/theory, white supremacy, xenophobia, genocide, fascism, Africana thought, global Black feminist thought, abolitionism, carceral logics, Afropessimism, global forms of anti-Blackness, authoritarianism and the meaning of democracy, social and political injustice, liberation politics, critical pedagogy, Critical Race Theory (CRT), white Christian nationalism, and more. As with "The Stone," he also writes standalone articles for Truthout.

Yancy has written about the importance of philosophy as grounded within the quotidian. He writes, "In terms of my own meta-philosophical turn, I came to understand that doing philosophy is an activity, one that is framed by various historically grounded assumptions, paradigms, disciplinary matrixes, linguistic communities, metaphorical devices, and narrative frames. Fundamentally, doing philosophy is a form of social engagement that is always already a process in medias res. And even while thinking 'alone,' one does not think without a language, which is socially and historically saturated with meaning. Many white philosophers that I’ve encountered, despite their pretensions to the contrary, are unable to brush off the dust of history and begin doing philosophy ex nihilo. More specifically, philosophizing is an embodied activity that begins within and grows out of diverse lived contexts; philosophizing takes place within the fray of the everyday. In their attempt to escape the social, to defy history, and to reject the body, many white philosophers have pretensions of being godlike. They attempt to defy the confluent social forces, the multiple identificatory registers, and their historicity and particularity, that shape their philosophical voices. They see themselves as totally detached from the often inchoate, social, and existential traffic of life and the background assumptions (race, gender, class, ability, sexuality) that are constitutive of a particular horizon of understanding. Having 'departed' from life, having rejected the force of effective history, embodied orientations (broadly construed), white philosophy is as good as dead, devoid of relevance, devoid of particularity, and escapist."

Also, in the Los Angeles Review of Books, he curated a special issue on the practical social significance of philosophy. Pulling from the work of essayist, poet, and feminist Adrienne Rich, Yancy has critiqued the field of philosophy as having lost the smell of the earth. And in his chapter contribution to the book A Companion to Public Philosophy (edited by McIntyre, McHugh, and Olasov, he argues, "I find problematic the distinction between 'public philosophy' and philosophy done within the classroom or within academia, especially where this distinction implies an incommensurable difference, a pure separation, a clean break. The 'public' is always already operative within the academically cloistered spaces of the classroom, and philosophical thinking is always already occurring outside the walls of academia. Within this context, I also find problematic the distinction between 'philosopher' and 'non-philosopher.' There is so much messiness when it comes to these 'dichotomies.'"

Additionally, he has published at CounterPunch, The Guardian, Inside Higher Ed, and The Chronicle of Higher Education. At "Academic Influence," Yancy has been called one of the top 10 influential philosophers in the decade spanning 2010–2020, due in part to the number of citations and web presence. Yancy was also the winner of the 2024 Public Philosophy Network's (PPN) Leadership Award. The Award recognizes the long-term and substantive contributions of philosophers to public philosophy. As of 2025, Yancy is the founder of "Candid Conversations with George Yancy." The inaugural event consisted of an exciting, engaging, and philosophically fecund and robust conversation with philosophers Cornel West and Judith Butler on October 29, 2025. On May 19, 2026, Yancy had the honor of being selected as the narrator in a performance of prominent rising composer Joel Thompson’s oratorio “To Awaken the Sleeper” with the DeKalb Symphony. The orchestral piece was conducted by Paul Bhasin. Thompson’s “To Awaken the Sleeper” is inspired by the work of Black writer James Baldwin and powerfully examines the deep contradictions in America's ideals versus its reality, while also articulating a steadfast and passionate sense of love and hope. In one review, William Ford writes, "The narration was delivered by George Yancy, professor of philosophy at Emory University. Using a microphone with remarkable clarity and articulation, Yancy projected Baldwin’s words with commanding presence and intellectual gravity. In a room where orchestral detail could easily blur into reverberant mass, the precision and immediacy of his spoken delivery became an anchoring force within the performance."

== Education and career ==
Yancy received his B.A. in philosophy from the University of Pittsburgh cum laude in 1985, his M.A. in philosophy from Yale University in 1987, his M.A. in Africana studies from New York University (NYU) in 2004, and his Ph.D. in philosophy from Duquesne University with distinction in 2005. He began teaching at Duquesne in 2005, progressing from assistant professor to full professor in eight years, 2005–2013. After teaching at Duquesne for ten years, he moved to teach philosophy at Emory University in 2015.

As an undergraduate at the University of Pittsburgh, Yancy wrote his undergraduate honors thesis on Bertrand Russell's Sense Data theory. His honors thesis was directed by American philosopher and epistemologist Wilfrid Sellars. Also at Pitt, he studied Kant under Nicholas Rescher, studied with Adolf Grunbaum on Freud's theory of religion, studied Martin Heidegger under John Haugeland, and took a graduate seminar on Plato taught by Mary Louise Gill, and modern philosophy under Annette Baier. Yancy also took a course entitled Human Nature taught by prominent political theorist John W. Chapman, which explored questions of human nature from Plato to Marx, Sartre, Freud and Skinner. While at Yale University, he took graduate seminars with eminent philosophers such as John Edwin Smith (on pragmatism), Maurice Natanson (on the thought of Alfred Schutz), Rulon Wells (on the philosophy of G. W. Leibniz), and others. While at New York University, Yancy took a seminar on democracy with political and economic theorist Leonard Wantchekon, a Black history course with historian Robert Hinton, and a seminar with poet Kamau Brathwaite in which Yancy was exposed to surrealism, magical realism, and radical decolonial ways to rethink W. Shakespeare's The Tempest. The Consortium that existed between NYU and Columbia University allowed Yancy to enroll in a seminar on Gender and the Diaspora taught by cultural anthropologist Donna Daniels at Columbia University. Yancy also wrote his MA thesis under the direction of Columbia University's comparative literary theorist Farah Griffin. While at Duquesne University, Yancy wrote his dissertation on race and embodiment under philosopher Fred Evans.

== Media appearances ==
Yancy has been interviewed on various radio stations throughout the U.S. He has also appeared in three documentaries, the six-episode series Rest in Power: The Trayvon Martin Story (2018), Lillian Smith: Breaking the Silence (2019), and interviewed for and appeared in the Netflix documentary, Power, by Oscar nominated American film producer, Yance Ford, on policing in America (2024).

== "Dear White America" ==
In 2015 Yancy published an article in the New York Times' philosophy column, The Stone, entitled "Dear White America". The article generated considerable controversy, resulting in him receiving large amounts of hate mail and harassment. This experience later helped convince the American Philosophical Association to issue a statement denouncing bullying and harassment. It also resulted in Yancy being added to the Professor Watchlist, a website which purports to document anti-conservative college professors, in 2016. He received over 1,000 messages of support. 68 philosophers and intellectuals signed a letter in his defense, supporting his freedom and the freedom of others to engage in philosophical discussions regarding major social and political issues. In response to being placed on the Professor Watchlist, Yancy wrote an opinion piece in The New York Times entitled "I am a Dangerous Professor."

== Works ==
=== Books ===
- The Innocence is the Crime: On the Freedom to Think Otherwise. Introduction and all interviews conducted by George Yancy. (Bloomsbury Academic, forthcoming ).
- Facing James Baldwin's Question of the Ni**er: The Need for White Courage and the Reality of Black Frustration. Edited by George Yancy and Timothy Golden. Separate introductions by George Yancy and Timothy Golden. (Temple University Press, forthcoming).
- Open Casket: Philosophical Meditations on the Lynching of Emmett Till. Edited by George Yancy and A. Todd Franklin. Separate introductions by George Yancy and A. Todd Franklin. (New York: Bloomsbury Publishing, 2025).
- Black Bodies, White Gazes, The Continuing Significance of Race in America. (Rowman & Littlefield, an imprint of Bloomsbury, Third Edition, 2025).
- In Sheep's Clothing: The Idolatry of White Christian Nationalism. Edited by George Yancy and Bill Bywater. Separate introductions by George Yancy and Bill Bywater; Foreword by J. Kameron Carter. (Rowman & Littlefield, 2024).
- Until Our Lungs Give Out: Conversations on Race, Justice, and the Future. (Rowman & Littlefield, 2023). Winner, Best Book (Social Sciences), Library Journal, 2023, and Winner of a CHOICE Outstanding Academic Title, 2024.
- Black Men from Behind the Veil: Ontological Interrogations. Edited and introduction by George Yancy (Lexington Books, 2022). Selected as a "Top 75 Community College Title" by Choice, under Social & Behavioral Sciences, November 2022.
- Across Black Spaces: Essays and Interviews from an American Philosopher. (Rowman & Littlefield, 2020)
- Buddhism and Whiteness: Critical Reflections. Co-edited and Introductory comments with Emily McRae (Lexington Books, 2019)
- Educating For Critical Consciousness. Edited with Introduction by George Yancy (Routledge, 2019)
- Backlash: What Happens When We Talk Honestly about Racism in America. (Rowman & Littlefield, 2018)
- On Race: 34 Conversations in a Time of Crisis. (Oxford University Press, 2017)
- Black Bodies, White Gazes: The Continuing Significance of Race in America, Second Edition. Foreword by Linda Alcoff. (Rowman & Littlefield, 2017)
- Our Black Sons Matter: Mothers Talk about Fears, Sorrows, and Hopes. Co-edited with Maria del Guadalupe Davidson and Susan Hadley. Introduction by George Yancy. Afterword by Farah Jasmine Griffin. (Rowman & Littlefield, 2016). This book was a STARRED Review and was also selected as the Booklist Top 10 List of the Best Diverse Nonfiction Titles in 2017.
- White Self-Criticality beyond Anti-Racism: How Does It Feel to Be a White Problem? Edited with introduction by George Yancy. (Lexington Books, 2015)
- Exploring Race in Predominantly White Classrooms: Scholars of Color Reflect. (Critical Social Thought Series). Co-edited with Maria Del Guadalupe Davidson. Co-authored Introduction and additional submission of chapter. (Routledge, 2014)
- Pursuing Trayvon Martin: Historical Contexts and Contemporary Manifestations of Racial Dynamics. Co-edited and co-authored Introduction with Janine Jones and additional submission of chapter. (Lexington Books, 2013). The first paperback edition of this book was published in 2014 along with a new preface written by the editors.
- Look, A White! Philosophical Essays on Whiteness. Foreword by Naomi Zack. (Temple University Press, 2012)
- Christology and Whiteness: What Would Jesus Do? Edited with Introduction by George Yancy. (Routledge, 2012)
- Reframing the Practice of Philosophy: Bodies of Color, Bodies of Knowledge. Edited with Introduction and chapter by George Yancy. (SUNY Press, 2012)
- Therapeutic Uses of Rap and Hip-Hop. Co-edited and co-authored Introduction with Susan Hadley. (Routledge, 2011)
- The Center Must Not Hold: White Women Philosophers on the Whiteness of Philosophy. Foreword by Sandra Harding. Edited with Introduction by George Yancy. (Lexington Books, 2010). The Center Must Not Hold: White Women Philosophers on the Whiteness of Philosophy was reprinted in paperback edition in 2011.
- Critical Perspectives on bell hooks. Co-edited with Maria Del Guadalupe Davidson. Co-authored Introduction and additional submission of chapter. (Routledge, 2009)
- Black Bodies, White Gazes: The Continuing Significance of Race. Foreword by Linda Alcoff. (Rowman & Littlefield, 2008). Received Honorable Mention from the Gustavus Myers Center for the Study of Bigotry and Human Rights.
- Philosophy in Multiple Voices. Edited with Introduction by George Yancy. (Rowman & Littlefield, 2007). Winner of the CHOICE Outstanding Academic Book Award for 2009.
- Narrative Identities: Psychologists Engaged in Self-Construction. Co-edited with Susan Hadley. Preface by Yancy and Hadley. (Jessica Kingsley Press, 2005)
- White on White/Black on Black. Foreword by Cornel West. Edited with Introduction and chapter by George Yancy. (Rowman & Littlefield, 2005). Winner of the CHOICE Outstanding Academic Book Award for 2005.
- What White Looks Like: African American Philosophers on the Whiteness Question. Edited with Introduction and chapter by George Yancy. (Routledge, 2004)
- The Philosophical I: Personal Reflections on Life in Philosophy. Edited with Introduction and chapter by George Yancy. (Rowman & Littlefield, 2002)
- Cornel West: A Critical Reader. Afterword by Cornel West. Edited with Introduction and chapter by George Yancy. (Blackwell Publishers, 2001)
- African-American Philosophers: 17 Conversations. Edited with Introduction, and all interviews conducted by George Yancy. (Routledge, 1998). Winner of the CHOICE Outstanding Academic Book Award for 1999.

=== The New York Times and Truthout articles and interviews conducted by Yancy ===
- (with Tim Golden) "Frederick Douglass’s Words Are More Relevant Than Ever on US’s 250th Birthday," July 2, 2026.
- (with Jeanelle K. Hope) "Trump’s Attacks on Black Power and Freedom Show How Far We Still Have to Go," June 18, 2026.
- (with Norman Solomon) "Trump’s War on Iran Is a Symptom of Unchecked US Military Power," May 16, 2026.
- "Trump Administration Is Using Christianity to Justify Murder and Empire," April 21, 2026.
- (with Carmen P. Thompson) "Trump Relies on Centuries-Old Notions of Whiteness to Activate His MAGA Base," April 4, 2026.
- (with Elizabeth Todd-Breland), "We Must Defend History --It Fuels Freedom Dreams of Students Under Attack," February 28, 2026.
- (with Robin D. G. Kelley), "Robin D. G. Kelley: It's Not enough to Abolish ICE --- We Have to Abolish the Police, February 26, 2026.
- (with Jeanelle K. Hope), "The Black Anti-Fascist Tradition Recognized Fascism Didn't Begin in Europe," February 21, 2026.
- (with Stephen C. Ferguson), "A New Era of Scholarship is Shining a Light on the Black Philosophical Tradition," February 18, 2026.
- (with Thomas A. Foster), "Black Men Endured Sexual Exploitation Under Slavery. Their Story Is Rarely Told: Historian Thomas A. Foster discusses his new book Rethinking Rufus: Sexual Violations of Enslaved Men," February 12, 2026.
- "I am on Kirk's 'Professor Watchlist.' I know How it Destroys Civil Debate," September 27, 2025.
- (with Barbara Applebaum), "We Can't Let White Nationalism Dictate What Is Taught and Learned in Classrooms," September 18, 2025.
- (with Stephen Brookfield), "Trump's Education Plan Seeks to Make Cruel Domination Into 'Comon Sense.," September 13, 2025.
- (with Nuraan Davids), "Authoritarian Wave in US Shows Democracy's Fragility, South African Scholar Says," September 6, 2025.
- "Peter Hegseth Has Banned 3 of My Books From the US Naval Academy," May 18, 2025.
- (with Muhammad Ali Khalidi), "'Striking Hard at Civilians': A Supremacist Ideology Underlies Israeli Policy." March 24, 2025.
- (with Norman Solomon), "How Should We Rethink Our Relationship to US Violence Around the World?" March 18, 2025.
- (with Farah Jasmine Griffin), "Black History Testifies to the Impossible Creative Power of Black Resistance." February 23, 2025.
- (with John H. McClendon), "Frederick Douglass’s Words Ring True: 'Power Concedes Nothing Without a Demand.'” February 15, 2025.
- (with Amber Musser), "Remember What Audre Lorde Told Us: The Oppressor Doesn't Determine What's True." February 8, 2025.
- (with Tim Golden), "Why the Right IS Wrong About Critical Race Theory." February 1, 2025.
- (with Cornel West), "Cornel West: We Must Keep Our Souls Intact as We Organize Under Trump Again." December 1, 2024.
- (with Maya Schenwar and Kim Wilson), "Abolition Work Shows US There's Joy to Be Found Even as the Word Is on Fire." November 19, 2024.
- (with Nurit Peled-Elhanan), "How Does Israel Justify Mass Killings? It Starts in the Schools." September 15, 2024.
- (with Zahi Zallous), "What Can the Black Freedom Struggle and Palestinian Liberation Teach Each Other?" September 8, 2024.
- (with Yasmeen Daher), "The Violent 'Othering' of Palestinians Has Political Roots." September 1, 2024.
- (with Dilek Huseyinzadegan), "Kant's Ideas Shaped Human Rights Theories. How do we Content with His Racism?" July 6, 2024.
- (with E. Hughes), "Juneteenth Reminds US That 'Black Freedom' Is an Ongoing Project." June 19, 2024.
- (with Alexandra Aladham), "Palestinian Graduate: Protestors Show Courage for Gaza as leaders Show Cowardice." June 9, 2024.
- (with Judith Butler), "Universities Have Failed Their Democratic Mission by Repressing Gaza Protests." May 10, 2024.
- (with Jeanine Weeks Schroer), "This Black History Month, Let's Recognize the Vitality of Black Feminist Thought." February 27, 2024.
- (with A. Todd Franklin), “Honoring Emmett Till Means Never Looking Away From the Horror of White Supremacy.” February 26, 2024.
- (with Molefi Kete Asante), "What is it About Black History that Frightens the Hell Out of the Far Right?" February 24, 2024.
- (with E. Anthony Muhammad), "Black Existentialism Brings Philosophy to Bear on Our White Supremacist World." February 21, 2024.
- (with Teresa Blankmeyer Burke), "What Can Deaf Philosophy Teach the World and How Will it Change it?" February 11, 2024.
- (with Josiah Ulysses Young III), "MLK Was a Philosopher of Hope. He Reminds US That Apathy Is a Dead End." January 15, 2024.
- (with Drew Leder), "How Can Philosophy Speak to a World in Crisis? The Answer May Lie in Our Bodies." January 7, 2024.
- (with Tim Wise), "Clinging to Whiteness Offers False Safety: True Liberation Requires Unending It." December 25, 2023.
- (with Michael Sawyer), "What Would Malcolm X Say About Gaza and Black resistance in the US Today?" December 23, 2023.
- (with Judith Butler), "Judith Butler: Palestinians Are Not Being 'Regarded as People' by Israel and US." October 31, 2023.
- (with Dorothy Roberts), "Dorothy Roberts Lays Out a Damning Expose of Medical Racism and 'Child Welfare.'" September 17, 2023.
- (with H. A. Nethery), "White Supremacy and 'White Innocence' Were Behind the Killings in Jacksonville." September 8, 2023.
- (with Liat Ben-Moshe), "Institutions Often Treat Disability and Mental Health Not With Care But Violence." June 15, 2023.
- (with Joe Feagin), "How Can We Resist Book Bans? This Banned Author Has Ideas." May 18, 2023.
- (with Idil Abdillahi), "Jordan Neely Is Being Blamed for His Own Death Due to Sanism and Racism." May 5, 2023w.
- (with Subini Annamma), "Let's Confront Ideas of 'Normality' -- They Are Rooted in Racism and Ableism." April 11, 2023.
- (with Laurence Ralph), "Policing Does Not Have Problems -- It is the Problem." April 8, 2023.
- (with Talila A. Lewis), "Incarceration and Ableism Go Hand in Hand, Says Abolitionist Talila Lewis." January 8, 2023.
- (with Talila A. Lewis), "Ableism Enables All Forms of Inequity and Hampers All Liberation Efforts." January 3, 2023.
- "Let's Honor Kevin Johnson by Dismantling the Systems that Failed Him," December 3, 2022.
- (with Christine Wieseler), "The 'Problem' Isn't Disabled Bodies, It's the Violent Structure of Our Society." October 11, 2022.
- (with Joel Michael Reynolds), "Ableism Organizes Most Social Life. How Do We Dismantle It?" September 25, 2022.
- (with Frank B. Wilderson III), "Afropessimism Forces US to Rethink Our Most Basic Assumptions About Society," September 14, 2022.
- "Innocent White People Are Also Complicit in the Anti-Black Murders in Buffalo," May 17, 2022.
- (with Robin D. G. Kelley). "Robin Kelley: White Indifference Is Normalizing Spectacular Acts of Violence," May 5, 2022.
- "If the State of the World Makes You Want to Scream, You're Not Alone," April 11, 2022.
- (with Adele Norris), "Anti-Black Racism IS Global. So Must Be the Movement to End It," March 14, 2022.
- "Death Surrounds US: We Cannot Ignore Its Reality, or Its Mystery," February 5, 2022.
- "Death Is for the Living." (The New York Times, physical copy). Tuesday, January 4, 2022, A16.
- "What I learned About Death From 7 Religious Scholars, 1 Atheist and My Father," January 2, 2022.
- "bell hooks, We Will Always Rage On With You," December 21, 2021.
- "George Floyd Isn't in the Headlines, But Trauma Continues for Black Men Like Me," November 9, 2021.
- "No, Black People Can't Be 'Racist,'" October 20, 2021.
- (with Mark Lewis Taylor). "Christianity IS Empty If It Doesn't Address the Racist Carceral State," September 26, 2021.
- (with Brian Burkhart). "US Founders Demonized Indigenous People While Coopting Their Political Practices," August 15, 2021.
- (with Akwugo Emejulu). "Black Feminist 'Back Talk' Anchors Resistance on Both Sides of the Atlantic," July 17, 2021.
- (with Kelly Brown Douglas). "Black Womanist Theology Offers Hope in the Face of White Supremacy," June 19, 2021.
- (with Robin D.G. Kelley). "The Tulsa Race Massacre Went Way Beyond "Black Wall Street"", June 1, 2021.
- (with David Roediger). "It's Time for 'Whiteness as Usual' to End: How do we overcome the death wish of white supremacy?", May 23, 2021.
- (with Noam Chomsky). "Chomsky: Big Pharma Cares More About Profiting From COVID Than Human Survival", May 10, 2021.
- (with Noam Chomsky). "Chomsky: Protests Unleashed by Murder of George Floyd Exceed All in US History", May 7, 2021.
- "Being 'Anti-Racist' Isn't Enough. The Violence of Whiteness Itself Must Be Exposed", April 5, 2021.
- (with Chelsea Watego). "'I Can't Breathe' Is a Cry Well Known to Black Indigenous People in Australia", March 24, 2021.
- (with Susannah Heschel). "White Supremacist Christianity Drives Trump's Loyal Mob. We Must Scream It Down", March 12, 2021.
- (with Cornel West). "Cornel West: The Whiteness of Harvard and Wall Street IS 'Jim Crow, New Style'", March 5, 2021.
- (with Elizabeth Stordeur Pryor). "White Journalists' Use of the N-Word IS an Intolerable Assault on Black Freedom", February 27, 2021.
- (with Jacob Kehinde Olupona). "Death Has Many Names", February 14, 2021.
- (with Peniel E. Joseph). "The Capitol Siege Was White Supremacy in Action. Trial Evidence Confirms that", February 13, 2021.
- (with Pedro A. Noguera). "Education Will Be Critical in the Fight for Democracy and Anti-Racism", February 5, 2021.
- (with Joy James). "Reaching Beyond 'Black Faces in High Places' : An Interview with Joy James", February 1, 2021.
- "Let's Not Lose Ourselves in Euphoria Over Trump's Exit. Anti-Blackness Persists", January 25, 2021.
- (with David Kyuman Kim). "We Have to Let White Supremacy Die in Order to Truly Live", January 17, 2021.
- (with Eric Foner). "Capitol Mob Reveals Ongoing Refusal to Accept Black Votes as Legitimate", January 12, 2021.
- (with Che Gossett), "Black Trans Feminist Thought Can Set Us Free", December 9, 2020.
- (with Leor Halevi). "Of Death and Consequences", December 8, 2020.
- (with Mari Matsuda). "Trump Is Attacking Critical Race Theory Because it is a Force for Liberation", November 18, 2020.
- (with Eduardo Mendieta). "Trump's Lying About COVD Amounts to Treason", November 1, 2020.
- (with Tracy Denean Sharpley-Whiting). "Founded on Inequality, Can the US Ever Be Truly Democratic and Inclusive?" October 31, 2020.
- (with Todd May). "How Should an Atheist Think About Death?", October 20, 2020.
- (with Brook Ziporyn). "How to Die (Without Trying)", September 16, 2020.
- (with Pankaj Jain). "Don't Fear Dying. Fear Violence", July 29, 2020.
- (with Woojin Lim). "George Yancy: To Be Black in the US is to Have a Knee Against Your Neck Each Day", July 18, 2020.
- (with Joe Feagin). "Confronting Prejudice Isn't Enough. We Must Eradicate the White Racial Frame", June 30, 2020.
- (with Todd May). "Policing Is Doing What It Was Meant To Do. That's the Problem", June 21, 2020.
- (with Noam Chomsky). "Noam Chomsky: Trump Has Adopted a 'Viva Death!' Approach to the Presidency", June 5, 2020.
- (with Karen Teel). "I believe that I Would See Her Again", May 20, 2020.
- "Ahmaud Arbery and the Ghosts of Lynchings Past", May 12, 2020.
- (with Judith Butler). "Judith Butler: Mourning Is a Political Act Amid the Pandemic and Its Disparities", April 30, 2020.
- (with Moulie Vidas). "What Judaism Teaches Us About the Fear of Death", March 26, 2020.
- (with Geshe Dadul Namgyal). "How Does a Buddhist Monk Face Death?", February 26, 2020.
- "Facing the Fact of My Death", February 3, 2020.
- "Dear God, Are You There?", August 7, 2019.
- (with Judith Butler). "When Killing Women Isn't a Crime", July 10, 2019.
- (with Cornel West). "Power Is Everywhere, but Love Is Supreme", May 29, 2019.
- "Why White People Need Blackface", March 4, 2019.
- "#IAm Sexist", October 24, 2018.
- (with Anita L. Allen). "The Pain and Promise of Black Women in Philosophy", June 18, 2018.
- "Should I Give Up on White People?", April 16, 2018.
- (with Drucilla Cornell) "James Bond is a Wimp", February 26, 2018.
- "Will America Choose King's Dream or Trump's Nightmare?", January 15, 2018.
- (with David Kyuman Kim). "An Open Letter of Love to Kim Jong-un", November 13, 2017.
- (with Noam Chomsky) "On Trump and the State Of the Union", July 5, 2017.
- "Is Your God Dead?", June 19, 2017.
- "It's Black History Month. Look in the Mirror", February 9, 2017.
- "I am a Dangerous Professor", November 30, 2016
- (with Brad Evans) "The Perils of being a Black Philosopher", April 18, 2016.
- "Dear White America", December 24, 2015.
- (with bell hooks) "Buddhism, the Beats and Loving Blackness", December 10, 2015.
- (with Seyla Benhabib) "Whom Does Philosophy Speak?", October 9, 2015.
- (with David Kim) "The Invisible Asian", October 8, 2015.
- (with Paul Gilroy) "What 'Black Lives' Means in Britain", October 1, 2015.
- (with Cornel West) "Cornel West: The Fire of a New Generation", August 19, 2015.
- (with Joe Feagin) "American Racism in the 'White Frame'", July 27, 2015.
- (with John D. Caputo) "Looking 'White' in the Face", July 2, 2015.
- (with Peter Singer) "Peter Singer: On Racism, Animal Rights and Human Rights", May 27, 2015.
- (with Molefi Kete Asante) "Molefi Kete Asante: Why Afrocentricity?", April 6, 2015.
- (with Anthony Appiah). "Kwame Anthony Appiah: The Complexities of Black Folk", April 16, 2015.
- (with Emily Lee) "Asian, American, Woman, Philosopher", April 6, 2015.
- (with Noam Chomsky) "Noam Chomsky on the Roots of American Racism", March 18, 2015.
- (with Falguni A. Sheth). "How Liberalism and Racism are Wed", February 27, 2015.
- (With Linda Alcoff), "Philosophy's Lost Body and Soul", February 4, 2015.
- (With Judith Butler). "What's Wrong With 'All Lives Matter?'", January 12, 2015.
- (with Joy James). "Black Lives: Between Grief and Action", December 22, 2014.
- (with Shannon Sullivan). "White Anxiety and the Futility of Black Hope", December 5, 2014.
- (with Charles Mills). "Lost in Rawlsland"), November 16, 2014.
- (with Naomi Zack). "What 'White Privilege' really means", November 5, 2014.
- "Walking While Black in the White Gaze'", September 1, 2013.

== See also ==
- Hypatia transracialism controversy
