= Frederick Evans =

Frederick, Frederic or Fred Evans may refer to:

- Frederick H. Evans (1853–1943), British photographer, primarily of architectural subjects
- Frederick Evans (Royal Navy officer) (1815–1885), Royal Navy officer and hydrographer
- Fred Evans (comedian) (1889–1951), British music hall and silent movie comedian
- Fred Evans (defensive tackle) (Frederick H. Evans, born 1983), American football defensive tackle
- Fred Evans (running back) (1921–2007), American football player for the Chicago Bears
- Fred Evans (boxer) (born 1991), Welsh boxer
- Fred Evans (radical militant), leader of an American radical militant group that helped plan and execute the Glenville shootout riot in 1968
- Fred Evans (union worker) (1881–1912), Australian unionist who died in the Waihi miners' strike of 1912
- Fred Evans (philosopher) (born 1944), American continental philosopher
- Frederick Mullett Evans (1803–1870), English printer and publisher, father-in-law of Charles Dickens, Jr.
- Frederick William Evans (1808–1893), Shaker writer
- Fred P. Evans (1862–?), British spiritualist medium
- Frederic Evans (cricketer) (1842–1927), English cricketer and Anglican cleric
- Frederic Dahl Evans (1866–1953), United States Army officer

== See also ==
- William Frederick Evans, 19th-century English entomologist who worked on Odonata and Orthoptera
