= Fred Evans (philosopher) =

American philosopher (born 1944)

- Born: June 6, 1944 (age 81)

Philosophical work
- Era: 21st-century philosophy
- Region: Western philosophy
- School: Continental philosophy
- Doctoral students: George Yancy
- Main interests: Social philosophy, political philosophy

Fred Evans (born June 6, 1944) is an American philosopher. He is a professor of philosophy at Duquesne University and Director of the Center for Interpretative and Qualitative Research. His research and teaching interests are in contemporary continental philosophy (Merleau-Ponty, Foucault, and Deleuze), social and political philosophy, and philosophy of language, psychology and technology.

Evans was born in Pittsburgh, Pennsylvania. His work is informed both by his experiences as a psychologist and his time spent working under the auspices of an NGO in Laos during the 1970s. A reflection on these influences and his academic and activist work can be found in his brief intellectual biography at Duquesne's website.

== Education ==
- 1966 B.A. Philosophy, Indiana University, Bloomington
- 1969 M.A. Philosophy, Indiana University, Bloomington
- 1977 M.A. Psychology, University of Regina, Saskatchewan, Canada
- 1986 Ph.D. Philosophy, State University of New York at Stony Brook

== Authored and edited books ==
- (2019) Public Art and The Fragility of Democracy: An Essay in Political Aesthetics, Columbia University Press
- (2008) The Multivoiced Body: Society and Communication in the Age of Diversity, Columbia University Press
- (2000) Chiasms: Merleau-Ponty's Notion of the Flesh, co-edited with Leonard Lawlor, State University of New York Press
- (1993) Psychology and Nihilism: A Genealogical Critique of the Computational Model of Mind, State University of New York Press

== Selected articles ==
- "Voices of Democracy: Citizenship and Public Art (Millennium Park)," in Outrage! Art, Controversy, and Society, eds. Andrea Ritivoi and Judith Schachter (New York: Palgrave, forthcoming).
- "Foucault and the 'Being of Language'," in The Cambridge-Foucault Lexicon, eds. Leonard Lawlor and John Nale (Cambridge: Cambridge University Press, forthcoming).
- "9/11: The 'Clash of Civilizations' and Cultural Rights," Journal of Philosophy: A Cross-Disciplinary Inquiry, vol. 6, no. 14, Winter, 2011.
- “’Unnatural Participations’: Merleau-Ponty, Deleuze, and Environmental Ethics,” Philosophy Today, 54, 142-152.
- "Deleuze, Bakhtin, and the 'Clamour of Voices', Deleuze Studies, vol. 2(2), 2008, 178-200.
- “La sociedad de todas las voces: Los zapatistas, Bajtín y los derechos humanos,” traducción por Juan Carlos Grijalva, Alteridad (revista académica, Faculdad de Ciencias Humanas y de la Educación, Universidad Politécnica Salesiana, Ecuador), No. 5, Nov. 2008, 44-62 (Spanish trans. of published English versión). Also published under the original title, *“Voces de Chiapas: los zapatistas, Bajtín y los derechos humanos,” in Sociedad (revista académica, Departamento de Ciencias Sociales de la Universidad Santiago de Cali, Colombia), forthcoming.
- "Iris Marion Young and 'Intersecting Voices'," Philosophy Today, 52, 2008, 10–18. (SPEP Supplemental Volume 33 of Selected Studies in Phenomenology and Existential Philosophy, eds. Peg Birmingham and James Risser).
- Entries on “Genealogical Critique” and “The Center for Interpretive and Qualitative Research,” for The SAGE Encyclopedia of Qualitative Research Methods, ed. Lisa M. Given (London: Sage Publications, Inc.), 369–71, 73–74, 2008.
- "Chiasm and Flesh," in Merleau-Ponty: Key Concepts, eds. Rosalyn Diprose and Jack Reynolds. Stocksfield, UK: Acumen Publishing Limited, 2008, 184–193.
- (with Barbara McCloskey), “Sixties Redux?: A Report from the 2004-05 Carnegie International (or Kutlug Ataman’s Provocation),” Kunst und Politik, Bd. 9, 2008, 175–181.
- “Citizenship, Art and the Voices of the City: Wodiczko’s The Homeless Projection.” In Acts of Citizenship, eds. Engin Isin and Greg Nielsen. London: Zed Books, 2008, 227–246.

(with Barbara McCloskey) “The New Solidarity: A Case Study of Cross-Border Labor Networks and Mural Art in the Age of Globalization’.” In Toward a New Socialism, eds. Anatole Anton and Richard Schmitt. New York: Rowman and Littlefield, 2007, 483-496.

- “Lyotard, Foucault, and ‘Philosophical Politics,’” International Journal of the Humanities, 3, 2006, 85-98.
- Entries on “Psychology,” “Cognitive Science,” “Bakhtin,” “Hubert Dreyfus,” “Dialogism,” and “Heteroglossia/Monoglossia” for the Edinburgh University Press Dictionary of Continental Philosophy, ed. John Protevi, Edinburgh, Scotland: Edinburgh University Press Ltd., 2005, and for A Dictionary of Continental Philosophy, ed. John Protevi, Yale University, Yale University Press, 2006.
- “Multi-Voiced Society: Philosophical Nuances on Salman Rushdie’s Midnight’s Children,” Florida Journal of International Law, 16:3, 2004, 727-741.
- “Cyberspace and the Concept of Democracy,” Studies in Practical Philosophy: A Journal of Ethical and Political Philosophy, 4:1, 2004, 71–101. (Originally published in First Monday).
- “Witnessing and the Social Unconscious,” Studies in Practical Philosophy: A Journal of Ethical and Political Philosophy, 3:2, Fall 2003, 57–83.
- “Lyotard, Bakhtin, and Radical Heterogeneity,” Continental Philosophy, Vol.8, 2003, 61–74.
- “Bakhtin, Communication, and the Politics of Multiculturalism.” Reprinted in Mikhail Bakhtin: Sage Masters of Modern Social Thought, vol. IV, ed. Michael E. Gardiner. London: SAGE Publications, 2003, 271–293. (Originally published in Constellations).
- “Dialogisme et droits de l’Homme au Chiapas,” trans. Louis Jacob, Cahiers de recherche sociologique, no. 36, 2002, 75-104 (A translation of my “Voices of Chiapas”).
- “Genealogy and the Problem of Affirmation in Nietzsche, Foucault, and Bakhtin,” Philosophy and Social Criticism, 27:3, 2001, 41–65.
- “Cyberspace and the Concept of Democracy,” First Monday, Vol. 5 (10) (October 2000) URL: http://www.firstmonday.org/issues/issue5_10/evans/index.html (a peer-reviewed electronic publication).
- “Voices of Chiapas: The Zapatistas, Bakhtin, and Human Rights,” Philosophy Today, 42, 2000, 196–210. (SPEP Supplemental Volume 25 of Selected Studies in Phenomenology and Existential Philosophy, ed. Linda Martín Alcoff and Walter Brogan).
- “’Chaosmos’ and Merleau-Ponty's Philosophy of Nature,” Chiasmi International: Trilingual Studies Concerning the Thought of Merleau-Ponty, 2, 2000, 63-82.
- “The Value of Flesh: Merleau-Ponty’s Philosophy and the Modernism/Postmodernism Debate” (with Leonard Lawlor); critical introductory essay to Chiasms: Merleau-Ponty's Notion of the Flesh, ed. Fred Evans and Leonard Lawlor. Albany, New York: State University of New York Press, 2000, 1-20.
- “Merleau-Ponty, Lyotard and the Basis of Political Judgment,” in Rereading Merleau-Ponty: Essays Across the Continental-Analytic Divide, ed. Lawrence Hass and Dorothea Olkowski. New York, NY: Prometheus Press, 2000, 253–274.
- “’Solar Love’: Nietzsche, Merleau-Ponty, and the Fortunes of Perception,” Continental Philosophy Review, vol. 31:2, 1998, 171-193.
- “Voices, Oracles, and the Politics of Multiculturalism,” Symposium, vol. 2:2, 1998, 179–189.
- “Bakhtin, Communication, and the Politics of Multiculturalism”, Constellations: An International Journal of Critical and Democratic Theory, vol. 5:3, 1998, 403–423.
- “Technology as Art and the ‘Spheres of Freedom and Necessity,’” Research in Philosophy and Technology, vol. 14, 1994, 219-234.
- “Marx, Nietzsche, and the ‘Voices of Democracy.’” In Paradigms in Political Theory: Marxism-Liberalism-Postmodernism, ed. Steven Jay Gold, Iowa State University Press, Spring, 1993, 79-97.
- “To ‘Informate’ or ‘Automate’: The New Information Technologies and Democratization of the Work Place,” The Journal of Social Theory and Practice, vol. 17:3, 1991, 409-439.
- “Cognitive Psychology, Phenomenology, and the ‘Creative Tension of Voices,’” Philosophy and Rhetoric, Vol. 24:2, 1991, 105-127.
- “Language and Political Agency: Derrida, Marx, and Bakhtin,” The Southern Journal of Philosophy, vol. 28:4, 1990, 249–266.
- “Marx, Nietzsche, and the ‘New Class,’” Journal of Speculative Philosophy, vol. 4:3, 1990, 505-524.
- “Marx, Nietzsche, y ‘La Nueva Clase,’” trad. por Magdalena Holguin, Ideas y Valores, Num. 74–75, Agosto-Diciembre, 1987, Publicacion de la Universidad Nacional de Colombia, Bogotá, Colombia, 81–98.

== See also ==
- American philosophy
- List of American philosophers

=== Academic homepage ===
- Fred Evans's webpage at Duquesne University
- Center for Interpretive and Qualitative Research
