= Joyce Mitchell Cook =

American philosopher

- Cook was honored in 2007 by the Collegium of Black Women Philosophers
- Born: October 28, 1933; Sharon, Pennsylvania
- Died: June 6, 2014 (aged 80)

Education
- Education: Bryn Mawr College; University of Oxford; Yale University (PhD, 1965)
- Thesis: A Critical Examination of Stephen C. Pepper's Theory of Value (1965)

Philosophical work
- Era: Contemporary philosophy
- Region: Western philosophy
- School: Analytic
- Institutions: Yale University, Wellesley College, Connecticut College, Howard University
- Main interests: Value theory

Joyce Mitchell Cook (October 28, 1933 – June 6, 2014) was an American philosopher. She was the first African American woman to receive a PhD in philosophy in the United States. After earning that degree from Yale University, she was the first female teaching assistant allowed at the university. She went on to teach at Wellesley College, Connecticut College, and Howard University. She served for several years as an analyst for African affairs at the State Department in Washington, D.C.

George Yancy, a leading figure in African American philosophy, has referred to her as "a significant pioneer in the field of American philosophy, a figure whose very historical presence speaks to her incredible tenacity as a Black woman within a discipline that continues to be predominantly white and male". Like other black women who were pioneers in their field, Cook's achievements have gone unnoticed for many years and scholarship around her work is just beginning.

== Education ==
Cook was one of 12 children born to Reverend Isaac William Mitchell, Sr. (a minister of the Church of God (Anderson, Indiana)) and Mary Belle Christman Mitchell in Sharon, Pennsylvania, on October 28, 1933. She attended Sharon High School and then Bryn Mawr College in 1951, where she intended on majoring in chemistry. She took her first philosophy course her freshman year, and then, inspired by her readings and professors, graduated from Bryn Mawr with a B.A. in philosophy in 1955. She then received a double M.A. in psychology and philosophy from Oxford University in 1957. After this, she went to Yale to receive her PhD in philosophy in 1965. Her dissertation was entitled A Critical Examination of Stephen C. Pepper's Theory of Value. In it she critiques Stephen Pepper's attempt to explain how one can make a 'well-grounded' decision. She argues that he commits the naturalistic fallacy by confusing the problem of how well grounded decision are made with how they should be made.

== Career ==
While at Yale, Cook edited The Review of Metaphysics and worked at the Yale University Press. She was the first female teaching assistant at Yale for any non-language class. It has been speculated that she was not just the first black woman to receive a philosophy PhD in the United States, but in the entire world. After Yale, Cook served as an analyst for African affairs in the State Department in Washington. She also worked as an editor in New York and for several years in the Office of Economic Opportunity. She taught at Wellesley College, Connecticut College, Howard University.

== Later life ==
Cook completed her dissertation on value theory, and was interested in this philosophy until her death. She became active in civil rights in the middle of her life. Cook also served on the Jimmy Carter administration as a speech writer and correspondence editor. She was in the middle of writing a book on the black experience when she died of illness on June 6, 2014.

== Legacy ==
Cook published very little as a philosopher. As of July 2020 PhilPapers, an online database of philosophical works, only lists two works to her name including her PhD dissertation (the other being "On the Nature and Nurture of Intelligence, Philosophical Forum 9(2):289, 1977). In an October 2017 response to a critique of his book, Black Rights / White Wrongs: The Critique of Racial Liberalism, for not mentioning the work of Cook, Charles W. Mills wondered if she had ever published at all.

In 2017 George Yancy published an article about Cook's life in The Western Journal of Black Studies. The article contained many quotes from Cook from an unpublished interview with Yancy in 1997 and other unpublished material.

In a 2018 New York Times interview with Anita L. Allen, Allen commented how the "first group of black women to get PhD's in philosophy attended top universities", but despite being brilliant and rigorously trained, still were rejected from philosophy positions. One of the many examples Allen gave of this was Cook being still denied tenure at Howard University, an historically black institution.

== Awards and recognition ==
In 2007, Cook received the Flame Award from the Collegium of Black Women Philosophers. George Yancy, an African American philosopher who interviewed Cook for his book African-American Philosophers: 17 Conversations, wrote in a letter that he sent to a fellow philosopher shortly after Cook's death:

Joyce was an unprecedented philosophical figure, and a very special friend. She was incredibly principled. I will remember her unfailing ethics, her brilliant wit, her deeply embodied laughter, and her pecan pie, which was out of this world.

The American Philosophical Association presents the Joyce Mitchell Cook Award biennially to a "trailblazing black woman philosopher". Yale University hosted the Joyce Mitchell Cook Conference in November 2015, where many scholars and pioneers in philosophy gathered to honor Cook. Yancy gave the inaugural address.
