= Divided Publishing =

Independent literary press based in Brussels and London

- Status: Active
- Founded: 2019
- Country of origin: Belgium / United Kingdom
- Headquarters location: Brussels and London
- Official website: divided.online

Divided Publishing is a publisher and literary press founded in 2019 and located in Brussels and London. The press publishes poetry, philosophy and cultural analysis, legal studies, translations, and inter-genre books.

== History ==
Divided Publishing was founded in 2019. The press has published new work by acclaimed writers and thinkers such as Fanny Howe, Joy James, and Jamieson Webster.

The White Review's Simryn Gill nominated Fanny Howe's Night Philosophy as Book of the Year. In an interview with author Fiona Alison Duncan, Howe confirms that the book includes appropriated text lifted from the United Nations’ 1959 ‘Declaration of the Rights of the Child’, which you re-title ‘The Rights of the Child (UN) Known Only to Adults’ as well as quotes from G.K. Chesterton and Michel de Certeau.

In 2021, the press published an English translation of Carla Lonzi's Self-Portrait. The book was translated by Allison Grimaldi Donahue and included an afterword by Claire Fontaine and records her interactions with 14 artists in the 1960s. The book was shortlisted for the ALTA Italian Prose in Translation Award in 2022. The text was originally published in Italy in 1969.

Fanny Howe's 2022 book, London-rose | Beauty Will Save the World, appeared in the author Dennis Cooper's blog under "5 books I read recently & loved." That same year, psychoanalyst and author Jamieson Webster published Disorganisation & Sex.

In an interview with 032c magazine, when the writer and Semiotext(e) publisher Chris Kraus was asked who else in publishing continually impressed her, she praised Nightboat Books and Divided, "There’s also a new press in London called Divided Press that’s pursuing an interesting agenda of philosophy, literature, and activism."

At large, the press publishes artists in the in-between or outside conventional standards or institutional support. Their mission is to champion authors who, "cannot balance or resolve their contradictions, who struggle to make peace in the industry or genre or category or world in which they end up."

== Notable authors and books ==
- Aurelia Guo - World of Interiors
- Fanny Howe - London-rose | Beauty Will Save the World
- Fanny Howe - 'Night Philosophy'
- Joy James - In Pursuit of Revolutionary Love: Precarity, Power, Communities
- Carla Lonzi - Self-portrait trans. Allison Grimaldi Donahue
- Georgia Sagri - Stage of Recovery
- Jamieson Webster - Disorganisation & Sex
