= Emmanuel Chukwudi Eze =

American philosopher

- Born: January 18, 1963; Northern Region, Nigeria
- Died: December 31, 2007 (aged 44); Lewisburg, Pennsylvania, United States
- Citizenship: Nigeria
- Occupations: Philosopher, writer, editor
- Era: Contemporary philosophy
- Notable work: Race and the Enlightenment, Postcolonial African Philosophy, Achieving Our Humanity

Emmanuel Chukwudi Eze (18 January 1963 – 31 December 2007) was a Nigerian philosopher. Eze was a specialist in postcolonial philosophy. He wrote as well as edited influential postcolonial histories of philosophy in Africa, Europe, and the Americas. He brought Immanuel Kant's racism to light among Western thinkers in the 1990s, an area of Kant's life that Western philosophers often gloss over. Influences in his own work include Paulin Hountondji, Richard Rorty, David Hume, and Immanuel Kant.

At the time of his death, Eze was Associate Professor of Philosophy at DePaul University, where he also founded and edited the journal Philosophia Africana . He died on December 31, 2007, in Lewisburg, Pennsylvania after a short illness.

== Background ==
Eze was born to Nigerian parents, Daniel and Rebecca (who are Igbo and devout Catholics), in Agbokete, in what was Northern Region of Nigeria. Because of his parents' ethnicity and religion they fled the North during the Nigerian Civil War to Nsukka, in the eastern part of the country.

== Education and teaching ==
Eze was educated by Jesuits in colleges in Benin City, Nigeria and Kimwenza, Zaire (now Democratic Republic of Congo). He attended St. Patrick's Elementary School in Iheakpu-Awka from 1970 to 1976. In 1982 he graduated from Igbo-Eze Secondary School. From September of the same year he worked as Clerk at the Kaduna State Ministry of Agriculture in Funtua.

In 1983 Eze resigned the job and enrolled at St. Ignatius Jesuit Novitiate in Benin City. From 1985 to 1987 he studied at S. Pierre Canisius College in Kimwenza, in the Democratic Republic of Congo. He then taught French language at Bishop Kelly College in Benin City for an academic year before moving to New York. He received his Masters (1989) and Ph.D. (1993) from Fordham University. His doctoral thesis was on "Rationality and the Debates about African Philosophy."

Eze taught at Bucknell University and at Mount Holyoke College. In addition, he was a post-doctoral visiting scholar at Cambridge University (1996–1997, where he designed the M.Phil. program in African Studies), a visiting professor at the New School for Social Research (1997) and at the University of Cape Town (2003).

== Works ==
=== Books ===
- On Reason: Rationality in a World of Cultural Conflict and Racism (2008) ISBN 978-0822341956
- Race and the Enlightenment: A Reader (1997), ISBN 0-631-20137-8.
- Postcolonial African Philosophy: A Critical Reader (1997), ISBN 0-631-20340-0.
- Achieving our Humanity: The Idea of the Postracial Future (2001), ISBN 0-415-92941-5.
- African Philosophy: An Anthology (2006), ISBN 0-631-20338-9.
- Pensamiento Africano (I): Ética y política, ISBN 84-7290-155-6.
- Pensamiento Africano (II): Filosofía, ISBN 84-7290-189-0.
- Pensamieto Africano (III): Cultura y Sociedad, ISBN 84-7290-282-X.

=== Articles ===
- "Out of Africa: Communication Theory and Cultural Hegemony". Telos 111 (Spring 1998). New York: Telos Press

== See also ==
- Africana philosophy
- African philosophy
- American philosophy
- List of American philosophers
