= Philosophia Africana =

Academic journal established in 1998

- Discipline: Philosophy
- Language: English
- Edited by: Kibujjo M. Kalumba

Publication details
- History: 2001–2016, 2019-
- Publisher: Philosophia Africana
- Frequency: Biannual

Standard abbreviations
- ISO 4: Philos. Afr.

Indexing
- ISSN: 1539-8250 (print); 1944-7914 (web)
- LCCN: 2008-215766
- OCLC no.: 60639500

Links
- Journal homepage; Online access

Philosophia Africana is a peer-reviewed academic journal of Africana philosophy established in 1998. It was published at DePaul University under the editorship of Emmanuel Chukwudi Eze until his death in 2007, and was subsequently edited by K. Kalumba (Ball State University). The journal won the 2002 Council of Editors of Learned Journals award for Best New Journal. It ceased publication of new issues in Fall 2016, and restarted in 2019, still under the editorship of Kibujjo Kalumba, at Penn State University Press. Online access to published issues up to volume 18 is provided by the Philosophy Documentation Center, and after that access is at the Scholarly Publishing Collective.

== See also ==
- List of philosophy journals
