= Black existentialism =

Philosophy concerning empowerment of the African diaspora

Black existentialism or Africana critical theory is a school of thought that "critiques domination and affirms the empowerment of Black people in the world". Although it shares a word with existentialism and that philosophy's concerns with existence and meaning in life, Black existentialism "is predicated on the liberation of all Black people in the world from oppression". Black existentialism may also be seen as method, which allows one to read works by African-American writers such as W. E. B. Du Bois, James Baldwin, and Ralph Ellison in an existentialist frame, as well as the work of Civil Rights Activists such as Malcolm X and Cornel West. Lewis Gordon argues that Black existentialism is not only existential philosophy produced by Black philosophers but is also thought that addresses the intersection of problems of existence in black contexts.

== Black Existential Philosophy ==
Black existential philosophy is a subset of Africana philosophy and Black philosophical thought. Africana philosophy is a form of philosophy emerging out of the critical thought of the African diaspora. This study is also referred to as 'Critical Race Theory' by some scholars. Black philosophical thought also pertains to the ideas emerging from Black-designated peoples. Such people include, for example, Australian Aboriginal people, who often refer to themselves as "Black." Thus, there is also work in Black existential philosophy from Australia, such as those organized through forums and articles by Danielle Davis in the Oodgeroo Unit of Queensland University of Technology in Brisbane, Australia. In the United States, Black existentialism emerged with the work and theories of sociologist W.E.B. Du Bois in the late 1800s. Since the Civil Rights movement, Black existentialism has been expanded upon by notable activists such as Malcolm X and Cornel West.

Though he was the first African American to earn a doctorate from Harvard University in sociology, the work of W. E. B. Du Bois has been honored in the canon of African-American philosophy. Du Bois' notion of double consciousness has been revisited by many scholars as a notion rooted in existentialist thought. Du Bois addressed several problems germane to Black existential philosophy, raising the question of the meaning of Black suffering as a philosophical problem. He also observed that Black people were often studied and addressed in public discussions as problems of the modern world instead of as people facing problems raised by modern life. Black people, he argued, often faced double standards in their efforts to achieve equality in the wake of enslavement, colonialism, and racial apartheid. This double standard led, he argued, to "twoness" and "double consciousness." The twoness was the experience of being "black" and "American," where the two were treated as contradictory. Double consciousness followed in two forms. The first was of the experience of being seen from the perspective of white supremacy and anti-black racism, the perspective of self-conceptualization as lowly and inferior as influenced by societal views on Blackness. The second, however, as Paget Henry argues, involves seeing the contradictions of a system that in effect blames the victim. That form of double consciousness involves seeing the injustice of a social system that limits possibilities for some groups and creates advantages for others while expecting both to perform equally. That Black people were imprisoned for challenging the injustices of a social system born on the memorable phrase, "All men are created equal...," is a case in point, and the subsequent criticism of whether "men" meant "women too" pushes this point further, as Frederick Douglass, Anna Julia Cooper, and other earlier 19th-century black critical thinkers contended. Du Bois also theorized the importance of black music, especially the spirituals, and through them raised the question of the inner-life of Black people, which he referred to as their "soul," which in his discussion of double consciousness became "souls". Du Bois also raised the problem of history in the study of Black existence. He noticed that double standards affected how history is told, and that the misrepresentation of history as an apology for white supremacy and colonialism led to the degradation of Black people as passive objects of history instead of makers of history. This occlusion depended on denying the struggles for freedom waged by Black people in the effort to expand the reach of freedom in the modern world.

A danger of Black suffering is that it could lead to a sense of pointlessness of Black existence and a lack of self-worth. Cornel West has addressed the problem of Black nihilism and its effect on the African-American community.

The proper starting point for the crucial debate about the prospects for Black America is an examination of the nihilism that increasingly pervades black communities. Nihilism is to be understood here not as a philosophic doctrine that there are no rational grounds for legitimate standards or authority; it is, far more, the lived experience of coping with a life of horrifying meaninglessness, hopelessness, and (most important) lovelessness. The frightening result is a numbing detachment from others and a self-destructive disposition toward the world. Life without meaning, hope, and love breeds a coldhearted, mean-spirited outlook that destroys both the individual and others.

Black suffering is also examined by the Martinican philosopher and psychiatrist Frantz Fanon (1925–1961). In his book Black Skin, White Masks (Grove Press, 1967; original French 1952), he argued that the modern world afforded no model of a normal Black adult. Instead, there are the pathologies of the Black soul, which he calls a white construction. This problem placed Black people in an alienated relationship with language, love, and even their inner dream life. Although he was careful to claim that there are exceptions to these claims, the general situation is as follows. Blacks who master the dominant language are treated either as not really black or receive much suspicion. Worse, they find themselves seeking white recognition, which affirms the role of whites as the standard by which they are judged. The matter repeats itself with love. Black women and Black men seeking white recognition do so, he argued, through asking for recognition from white male symbols of authority. That effort is self-deceiving. It makes such Black women ask to be loved as white instead of as women, and it makes such Black males fail to be men. Fanon also references the philosophical problem of reason and its relation to emotions by considering whether a flight into Négritude, the intellectual movement coined by Aimé Césaire, could enable Blacks to love themselves by rejecting white reason. But Jean-Paul Sartre's criticism in his essay "Orphée Noir" ("Black Orpheus") led Fanon into "changing his tune" by realizing that such a path was still relative to a white one and expected a "universal" humanity, which for Sartre was a revolutionary working class. Fanon's response was that he needed not to know that, and later on in A Dying Colonialism (Grove Press, 1967; original French 1959), he pointed out that although whites created the Negro, it was the Negro who created Négritude. His point was that it was still an act of agency, and that theme of being what he called "actional" continued in his writings. At the end of Black Skin, White Masks, he asked his body to make of him a man who questions. Fanon's point was that racism and colonialism attempted to over-determine black existence, but as a question, black existence faced possibility and could thus reach beyond what is imposed upon it. In The Wretched of the Earth (Grove Press, 1963; original French 1961), he returned to this question at the historical level by demanding the transformation of material circumstances and the development of new symbols with which to set afoot a new humanity.

Black existential philosophical thought was also influential in the South African anti-apartheid movement through the thought of Steve Bantu Biko. In I Write What I Like, Biko continues Fanon's project of thinking through alternative conceptions of humanity and offers his theory of Black Consciousness. Black consciousness applies to anyone who is involved in anti-racist struggle and is marked as the enemy of an anti-black, racist state. Thus for Biko, all people of color—indigenous Africans, Asians, mixed peoples, and whites who are "blackened" by their allegiance to anti-racism—are black. Biko presents here a political view of identity that resists a prior essence of black identity. One becomes black, reminiscent of Simone de Beauvoir's observation that one becomes a woman. South African philosophers influenced by Biko's existentialism include Noel Chabani Manganyi. The influence of Biko's thought is also discussed in Andile, Mngxitama, Amanda Alexander, and Nigel Gibson (eds), Biko Lives!: Contesting the Legacies of Steve Biko (New York: Palgrave Macmillan, 2008).

Black existential philosophy came to the academy in the 1970s in the work of William R. Jones, who argued for a humanistic response to black suffering through facing the absurd as found in the thought of Albert Camus and dealing with the contradictions of theological beliefs pointed out by Jean-Paul Sartre. Jones drew upon existential philosophy to reject non-verifiable claims posed by black theology, where history is presented as God trying to liberate black people. Historical evidence, Jones suggests, says otherwise. Instead of relying on God, black people should take their lives and history into their own hands and build a better future for human kind. This is not to say that Jones took the position that blacks who believe in God should not love God. His point is that they should not rely on God for the elimination of injustice on earth.

A philosopher heavily influenced by Du Bois, Fanon, and Jones is Lewis Gordon, who argues that black existential philosophy "is marked by a centering of what is often known as the 'situation' of questioning or inquiry itself. Another term for situation is the lived- or meaning-context of concern. Implicit in the existential demand for recognizing the situation or lived-context of Africana people's being-in-the-world is the question of value raised by people who live that situation. A slave's situation can only be understood, for instance, through recognizing the fact that a slave experiences it. It is to regard the slave as a value-laden perspective in the world". Gordon later argues in Existentia Africana that such a concern leads to a focus in black existential philosophy on problems of philosophical anthropology, liberation, and critical reflection on the justification of thought itself. The first asks the question, What is a human being? The second asks how can one become free. And the third is critical even of the methods used to justify the first two. Gordon argues that these questions make sense because enslaved, colonized, and dehumanized people are forced to question their humanity. That leads to questioning the meaning of being human. He argues that concerns with liberation make sense for people who have been enslaved, colonized, and racially oppressed. Because these questions are posed as objects of inquiry and demand the transformation of consciousness such as the transition from Du Bois's first form of double consciousness to the second, critical one, Gordon advocates a black existential phenomenological approach, which he sometimes call a postcolonial phenomenology or a decolonial one.

A philosopher influenced by Gordon is Nelson Maldonado-Torres, whose Against War (Duke University Press, 2008) offers a "decolonial reduction" of the forms of knowledge used to rationalize slavery, colonialism, and racism. Drawing upon ideas from Aimé Césaire, the Lithuanian Jewish philosopher Emmanuel Levinas, Frantz Fanon, and the Argentinian philosopher Enrique Dussel, Maldonado-Torres calls the practices of dehumanization in the modern world "Hitlerism" and advocates the "decolonial sciences" (race and ethnic studies, Africana studies, women's studies) as critical forms of knowledge to articulate the humanistic project demanded by Fanon.

There is also the growing area of black feminist existential philosophy. Foundations of this area of thought are in the 19th-century and early 20th-century thought of Anna Julia Cooper, who explored problems of human worth through challenging the double standards imposed upon black populations in general and black women in particular. She argued, in response to the racist claims of black worthlessness (that the world would be better off without black people), that the measure of worth should be based on the difference between contribution and investment. Since very little was actually invested in black people but so much was produced by them, she argued that black worth exceeds that of many whites. She used the same argument to defend the worth of black women. More recently in the academy, black feminist existential philosophy is taken up by Kathryn Gines, founder of the Collegium of Black Feminist Philosophers. Gines's work brings together ideas from Cooper, Sartre, Fanon, Hannah Arendt, bell hooks, and recent work in Africana phenomenology and black popular culture in such articles as: "Sex and Sexuality in Contemporary Hip-Hop" in Derrick Darby and Tommie Shelby (eds), Hip Hop and Philosophy: Rhyme 2 Reason—A Series in Pop Culture and Philosophy (Chicago: Open Court, 2005), and "The Black Atlantic, Afrocentricity, and Existential Phenomenology: Theoretical Tools for Black European Studies," Black European Studies, on line at Synlabor.de.

== Black Existential Literature ==
Ralph Ellison's Invisible Man, the archetype of black existentialist literature, is one of the most revered and reviewed novels written by an African-American writer. It presents examples of absurdism, anxiety and alienation in relation to the experience of the black male in mid-1900s America. The namelessness of the main character of the novel, a figure based on Ellison's own life, points to the trauma of black people receiving names that were forced on them from the violence of slavery. That renaming was meant to inaugurate a loss of memory, and that process of dismemberment is explored in the novel as the protagonist moves from one abusive father figure to another—white and black—to a culminating reflection on living as an invisible leech off of the system that produces light. In Ellison's novel, the only black characters who seemed somewhat free were those designated insane, as in the famous scene at the Golden Day bar where a group from an insane asylum became the critical voice early in the novel.

The African-American writer who was the closest to the Sartrean existentialist movement was Richard Wright, although Wright saw himself as working through the thought of Søren Kierkegaard with a focus on themes of dread and despair, especially in his novel The Outsider. Dismayed with his experience of American racism in the south, Wright sought refuge in a Parisian life. In France, he was heavily influenced by Les Temps modernes members Sartre, de Beauvoir, Merleau-Ponty. The existential novels that he wrote after leaving the United States, such as The Outsider, never received the high critical acclaim of Native Son. In his famous introduction to Native Son, Wright made concrete some of the themes raised by Du Bois. He pointed to the injustice of a system in which police officers randomly arrested young black men for crimes they did not commit and prosecutors who were able to secure convictions in such cases. He also argued that Bigger Thomas, the anti-hero of the novel, was produced by such a system and is often envied by many as a form of resistance to it. Wright's insight portended the emergence, for example, of the contemporary black "gangsta," as portrayed in gangsta rap.

In retrospect, James Baldwin has been considered by others as a black existentialist writer; however he was quite critical of Richard Wright and suspicious of his relationship with French intellectuals.

Baldwin also brought questions of interracial and bisexual relationships into consideration and looked at the question of suffering as a struggle to defend the possibility of genuine human relationships in his novel Another Country.

The writings of Toni Morrison are also contributions to black existentialism. Her 1970 novel The Bluest Eye examines how "ugliness" and "beauty" dominate black women's lives as imitations of white women as the standard of beauty. Her famous novel Beloved (1987) raises the question of the trauma that haunts black existence from slavery.

== W.E.B. Du Bois ==
The first African American to earn a doctorate from Harvard University earned his degree in sociology, however the work of W. E. B. Du Bois has been honored in the canon of African-American philosophy. Du Bois' notion of double consciousness has been revisited by many scholars as a notion doused in existentialism. Du Bois addressed several problems germane to Black existential philosophy. He raised the question of Black suffering as a philosophical problem. Was there meaning behind such suffering? He also observed that Black people were often studied and addressed in public discussions as problems of the modern world instead of as people facing problems raised by modern life. Black people, he argued, often faced double standards in their efforts to achieve equality in the wake of enslavement, colonialism, and racial apartheid. This double standard led, he argued, to "twoness" and "double consciousness." The twoness was the experience of being "black" and "American," where the two were treated as contradictory. Double consciousness followed in two forms. The first was the experience of being seen from the perspective of white supremacy and anti-black racism. It was from the perspective of seeing themselves as lowly and inferior. Du Bois discusses this observation and theory in his essay, The Souls of Black Folk (1903). The second, however, as Paget Henry argues, involves seeing the contradictions of a system that in effect blames the victim. That form of double consciousness involves seeing the injustice of a social system that limits possibilities for some groups and creates advantages for others while expecting both to perform equally. That Black people were imprisoned for challenging the injustices of a social system born on the memorable phrase, "All men are created equal...," is a case in point, and the subsequent criticism of whether "men" meant "women too" pushes this point further, as Frederick Douglass, Anna Julia Cooper, and other earlier nineteenth-century Black critical thinkers contended. Du Bois also theorized the importance of black music, especially the spirituals, and through them raised the question of the inner life of Black people, which he referred to as their "soul," which in his discussion of double consciousness became "souls". Du Bois also raised the problem of history in the study of Black existence. He noticed that double standards affected how history is told and that the misrepresentation of history as an apology for white supremacy and colonialism led to the degradation of Black people as passive objects of history instead of makers of history. This occlusion depended on denying the struggles for freedom waged by Black people in an effort to expand the reach of freedom in the modern world.

== Malcolm X ==
Unlike many other Black philosophers, Malcolm X was not introduced to philosophy or existentialism through higher education. Rather, he became interested in Black existentialism through his work as an activist and his relationship with Islam. In his work as an activist, Malcolm X birthed the organization of Afro-American Unity, which was concerned with "...a social, political, and economic network for creating consciousness among black people..." and to encourage Black individuals to explore the concepts of cultural self-determination and enlightenment to liberate themselves— each of which are essential thoughts to Black existentialism.

== Existentialism vs. Black Existentialism ==
As Black existentialism is a subset of existential philosophy, the two thoughts overlap on subjects of existence, consciousness, anxiety, nihilism, despair, and fear. However, there are also several key differences between Black existentialism and Euro-centric existentialism. One of the main differing factors is the idea of the "individual". In existentialism, the individual is the focus; one's actions, personal meaning, and awareness take centerfold. However, in Black existentialism, there is minimal focus on individualism or irreducibility. Rather, the focus is on Black consciousness and liberation on a global scale— often making comparative references to the suffering of Black individuals in the United States, and all across the African diaspora. Repeatedly, Black existential philosophers call and compare for the liberation of Black people worldwide. Black existentialism also argues against the common misconception that all Black experience is the same. This misconception increases the struggle for Black individuals to define their identity and greater meaning. That element of identity is shared between Existentialism and Black existentialism. Both thoughts state that the human identity and experience are unique and have long been categorically distorted.

== See also ==
- Achille Mbembe
- Lewis Gordon
- Frantz Fanon
- Whiteness theory
