= Anthony Sean Neal =

American philosophy professor

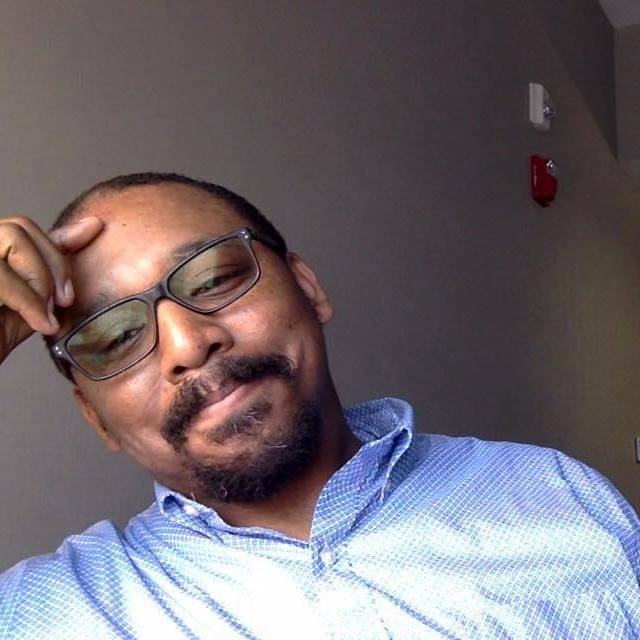

Education
- Education: Morehouse College; Mercer University; Clark Atlanta University

Philosophical work
- School: Process philosophy, continental philosophy
- Institutions: Mississippi State University
- Main interests: Aesthetics, African American philosophy, African American philosophy of religion, critical theory, political philosophy

Anthony Sean Neal is an American philosophy professor and author. In 2021, Neal was awarded the title Beverly B. and Gordon W. Gulmon Dean's Eminent Scholar. Neal is an author and professor of philosophy at Mississippi State University. Neal is a Fellow of the American Institute of Philosophical and Cultural Thought. Neal is also an American Philosophical Association Fellow at the Institute for Advanced Studies in the Humanities at the University of Edinburgh, UK. He is also a Fellow of the Shackouls Honors College. He is a 2019 inductee into the Morehouse College Collegium of Scholars. In April 2026, Neal was inducted into the Phi Beta Kappa Society, the Gamma Chapter of Mississippi, as an honorary member at Mississippi State University. Neal received his master's degree at Mercer University and his doctorate in humanities with a concentration in African American Philosophy and Religion from Clark Atlanta University. His main research areas include Aesthetics, Africana Philosophy (African American Modern Era, NeoClassical African Philosophy), Critical Theory, Neo-Platonism, Philosophy of Religion. Neal is a specialist on the philosophy of Howard Thurman and the Modern Era of the African American Freedom Struggle (1896-1975). Neal is also a past president of the Mississippi Philosophical Association.

== Selected publications ==
- Common ground: A Comparison of the Ideas of Consciousness in the Writings of Howard W Thurman and Huey P. Newton (2015)
- Howard Thurman's Philosophical Mysticism: Love Against Fragmentation (2019)
- Philosophy and the Modern Era of the African American Freedom Struggle: A Freedom Gaze, (Lanham, MD: Lexington Press, 2022)
- Crimes Against Humanity in the Land of the Free: Can a Truth and Reconciliation Process Heal Racial Conflict in America? (2014)
- (R) evolutions of Consciousness in Thurman and Newton: Anthony Neal, Author of Common Ground, Meets Critics Dwayne A. Tunstall and Felipe Hinojosa The Acorn 17 (1), 61-77 (2017)
- Howard Thurman's Mystical Logic: Creatively Encountering Oneness–A Logical Analysis of Thurman's Theology Black Theology 15 (3), 224-244 (2017)
- Connecting the Ideological Lineage: From W.E.B. Du Bois to Huey P. Newton, Journal of Pan African Studies 9 (4), 32-46 (2016)
- What Is Philosophy and What Is Its Purpose in Freemasonry?, Phylaxis 53 (4), 17-18 (2016)
- Imposing Morality: Cultural Perspectives on Truth, Apologies, and Forgiveness in the United States
