= Annual Review of Information Science and Technology =

American information technology journal

- Discipline: Information science
- Language: English
- Edited by: Lisa M. Given

Publication details
- History: 1965–2011; 2021–present
- Publisher: Wiley
- Frequency: Annually
- Impact factor: 2.000 (2010)

Standard abbreviations
- ISO 4: Annu. Rev. Inf. Sci. Technol.

Indexing
- CODEN: ARISCB
- ISSN: 0066-4200 (print); 1550-8382 (web)
- LCCN: 66025096
- OCLC no.: 01481502

Links
- Journal homepage

The Annual Review of Information Science and Technology was relaunched by the Association for Information Science and Technology's Board of Directors in 2021, following a 10-year publishing hiatus. Previously, this annual review journal was published from 1966 to 2011 during which it was established in 1965 by the American Documentation Institute and the National Science Foundation, at the request of Helen Brownson. It published review articles rather than empirical research articles. Its last (2010) impact factor was 2.000. It was for 45 years "the main forum for scholarly review articles in information science."

== Publishers and editors ==
The current editor is Lisa M. Given, Professor of Information Sciences at RMIT University. The first editor-in-chief was Carlos Cuadra (System Development Corporation). It won the Best Information Science Book of the Year from the Association for Information Science and Technology in 1966. From Vol. 11 (1976) - vol. 35 (2001) editor-in-chief was Martha E. Williams; from Vol. 36 (2002) to Volume 45 (2011) the editor was Blaise Cronin.

The first publisher was Encyclopædia Britannica, Inc.; since Vol. 26 (1991) it was published by Information Today, Inc. on behalf of American Society for Information Science and Technology.
