= John H. McClendon =

American philosopher

John H. McClendon III is a professor in the department of philosophy at Michigan State University. He holds a doctorate in philosophy from the University of Kansas, and taught at Binghamton University, Eastern Illinois University, University of Illinois Champaign/Urbana, Bates College, and the University of Missouri before coming to Michigan State University. His areas of focus include African philosophy, marxist philosophy, philosophy of African-American studies, and the history of African-American philosophers.

== Contributions to philosophy ==
McClendon is the editor of the American Philosophical Association newsletter, Philosophy and the Black Experience. He is an ex officio member of the Committee on Blacks in Philosophy—American Philosophical Association. He has lectured widely throughout the country and abroad, and was the Charles Phelps Taft lecturer for the 35th anniversary of the University of Cincinnati's African-American Studies Department, the keynote speaker for Black History Month at Mississippi State University, and a faculty member for the Schomburg-Mellon Humanities Summer Institute.

== Books ==
McClendon is the author or coauthor of:

- C. L. R. James's Notes on Dialectics: Left Hegelianism Or Marxism-Leninism? (Lexington Books, 2005)
- Beyond the White Shadow: Philosophy, Sports and the African American Experience (with Stephen Ferguson and Malik Simba, Kendall Hunt Publishing Company, 2012)
- Philosophy of Religion and the African American Experience: Conversations with my Christian Friends (Brill-Rodopi, 2017)
- African American Philosophers and Philosophy: An Introduction to the History, Concepts, and Contemporary Issues (with Stephen Ferguson, Bloomsbury, 2019)
- Black Christology and the Quest for Authenticity: A Philosophical Appraisal (Rowman & Littlefield, 2019)

== See also ==
- American philosophy
- Black existentialism
- Africana philosophy
- List of American philosophers
