= Helen Brownson =

American information scientist and government executive

- Born: May 1, 1917; Kansas City, KS
- Died: August 5, 2017 (aged 100)
- Education: University of Kansas
- Occupation: Information scientist
- Years active: 1941-1970

Helen Brownson (May 1, 1917 – August 5, 2017) was a United States federal government employee and a pioneer in the development of the field of information science. She is credited with popularizing the idea of the thesaurus as it applies to information science. She founded the journal the Annual Review of Information Science and Technology (ARIST).

== Education and early career ==
Brownson was born in Kansas City, Kansas in 1917. She attended the University of Kansas, and graduated as a member of the Phi Beta Kappa honor society in 1938 with a major in Spanish and minors in English and French. She worked as a secretary in the coffee trade, employing her Spanish language skills to handle correspondence and spoken communication with businesses in South and Central America.

== Government career ==
Brownson married in 1941, and moved to Washington, D.C., when her husband took a job in the Office for Emergency Management. In 1942, she found work as the secretary to Dr. A. N. Richards, the chair of the United States government's Committee on Medical Research (CMR). At CMR, she wrote abstracts for the department's history and compiled bibliographies of scientific publications. Following the termination of the CMR in 1947, Brownson became the secretary for the Special Committee on Technical Information (SCTI) of the government's Joint Research and Development Board. SCTI was tasked with improving the information-sharing mechanisms of the Atomic Energy Commission, the U.S. military, and their contractors. Brownson worked with the committee's executive director Norman Ball to develop and implement a classification system for organizing the reports managed by the committee. During this time, she began research on mechanized information storage and retrieval systems; she was also serving on the board of the American Documentation Institute and was the editor of the abstracts section of the journal American Documentation.

In 1951, Brownson began work at the National Science Foundation (NSF), first as the assistant for program development, and from 1954 to 1966 as the program director for scientific documentation. Her work focused on developing and improving mechanized systems of information storage and retrieval and systems for communicating scientific knowledge at a time of rapid scientific advancement. The work included work on machine translation; one effort toward the process of machine translation was the development of the idea of the thesaurus to establish a controlled vocabulary of codified keywords, showing relationships with other terms. Brownson is sometimes credited with inventing the idea of the thesaurus, but it is more likely that she popularized the term and the idea while coordinating the work of several researchers using such an approach.

Between 1957 and 1969, Brownson and her staff compiled a series of fifteen technical reports entitled Current Research and Development in Scientific Documentation, as well as a series on Nonconventional Scientific and Technical Information Systems in Current Use. These reports highlighted the need for regular updates in the emerging field of information science (then also known as the field of "documentation"). To meet that need, Brownson organized a meeting between the American Documentation Institute, and subsequently administered a grant to support the first two volumes of the Annual Review of Information Science and Technology.

Brownson left NSF for a position at the Central Intelligence Agency (CIA) in 1966, where she worked until her retirement in June 1970. At the CIA, she worked in a research division coordinating the work of computer scientists and CIA analysts to develop information-processing systems. Following her retirement, Brownson volunteered her services at the Smithsonian Institution, where she applied her skills to cross-indexing materials related to music and art.

=== Government positions held ===
- 1942–1947, Secretary to the chairman, Committee on Medical Research
- late 1940s–1951, Secretary, Special Committee on Technical Information
- 1951–1954, Assistant for Program Development, National Science Foundation/Office of Scientific Information
- 1954–1966, Program Director for Scientific Documentation, National Science Foundation/Office of Scientific Information
- 1966–1970, Central Intelligence Agency

== Death ==
Brownson died at the age of 100 on August 5, 2017. She left a $247,000 bequest to the School of Languages, Literature & Cultures at her alma mater, the University of Kansas.

== Selected publications ==
- Tumbleson, R.; Brownson, H. L. (March 19, 1954). "Survey of Operations and Finances of Scientific Journals". Science. 119 (3090): 357–359. Bibcode:1954Sci...119..357T. doi:10.1126/science.119.3090.357. ISSN 0036-8075. PMID 13156598.
- Brownson, H. L. (December 30, 1960). "Research on Handling Scientific Information". Science. 132 (3444): 1922–1931. Bibcode:1960Sci...132.1922B. doi:10.1126/science.132.3444.1922. ISSN 0036-8075. PMID 17843033.
- Brownson, Helen L. (1965). "Evaluation of document searching systems and procedures". Journal of Documentation. 21 (4): 261–266. doi:10.1108/eb026375.
