= Fred P. Evans =

19th-century spiritualist

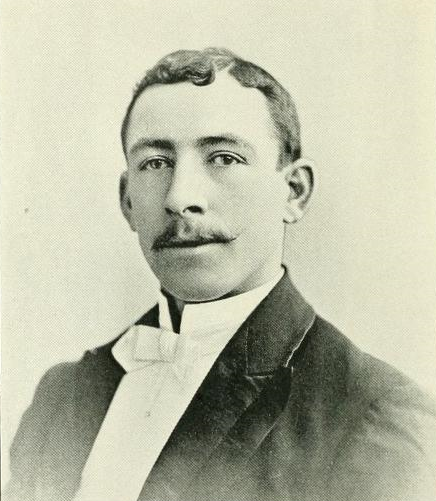
Fred P. Evans

Fred P. Evans (born 1862) was a British spiritualist medium.

He was born in Liverpool on 9 June 1862. His great-grandfather was the Welsh social reformer Robert Owen. As a young man, Evans worked as a sailor and claimed to have experienced strange psychical events. In 1884 he moved to San Francisco where he gave séances to the public. Evans was an early proponent of slate-writing mediumship.

British biologist Alfred Russel Wallace who attended a séance with Evans in 1887 was convinced the slate-writing phenomena was genuine evidence for spirit communication and reported that there were five different coloured messages.

Slate-writing was popular in the late-nineteenth century but was discredited as fraudulent after investigations from magicians and psychical researchers. In 1898, the magician Chung Ling Soo revealed the fraudulent slate-writing methods that Evans, Henry Slade and others had utilized.
