= Collegium of Black Women Philosophers =

The Collegium of Black Women Philosophers (CBWP) is an organization which was created to increase the visibility of black women in the field of philosophy and to allow greater networking and mentoring opportunities for these women. The organization is currently based at Penn State University.

== History ==
The first meeting of CBWP took place in 2007. The organization was founded by Kathryn Belle. Belle felt that it was important to address the issue of the small number of black women in the field of philosophy. Belle reached out black women by email and was able to contact all thirty-one African American women professors, many of which were able to attend the first conference. The first conference was held at Vanderbilt University in 2008 and included Joyce Mitchell Cook, the first African American woman to earn a PhD in philosophy.
