= Lewis Gordon =

American philosopher

- Born: Lewis Ricardo Gordon; May 12, 1962 (age 64)
- Spouse: Jane Anna Gordon

Education
- Education: Lehman College (CUNY); Yale University
- Doctoral advisor: Maurice Natanson

Philosophical work
- Era: Contemporary philosophy
- Region: Western philosophy
- School: Continental philosophy Black existentialism
- Institutions: Purdue University; Brown University; Temple University; University of Connecticut
- Doctoral students: Rowan Ricardo Phillips, Phillip Barron
- Main interests: Africana philosophy; Black existentialism; phenomenology

Lewis Ricardo Gordon (born May 12, 1962) is an American philosopher at the University of Connecticut who works in the areas of Africana philosophy, existentialism, phenomenology, social and political theory, postcolonial thought, theories of race and racism, philosophies of liberation, aesthetics, philosophy of education, and philosophy of religion. He has written particularly extensively on Africana and black existentialism, postcolonial phenomenology, race and racism, and on the works and thought of W. E. B. Du Bois and Frantz Fanon.

== Career ==
Gordon graduated in 1984 from Lehman College, CUNY, through the Lehman Scholars Program, with a Bachelor of Arts degree with high honors and as a member of Phi Beta Kappa. He completed his Master of Arts and Master of Philosophy degrees in philosophy in 1991 at Yale University, and received his Doctor of Philosophy degree with distinction from the same university in 1993. Following the completion of his doctoral studies, Gordon taught at Brown University, Yale, Purdue University, and Temple University, where he was the Laura H. Carnell Professor of Philosophy in the department of philosophy with affiliations in religious and Judaic studies. He is currently professor of Philosophy and Africana Studies, with affiliations in Judaic Studies and the Caribbean, Latino/a, and Latin American Studies, at the University of Connecticut at Storrs. He also is Visiting Euro philosophy Professor at Toulouse University, France, and Nelson Mandela Visiting professor in Political and International Studies at Rhodes University in South Africa (2014–2016).

At Temple, Gordon was director of the Institute for the Study of Race and Social Thought (ISRST), which is devoted to research on the complexity and social dimensions of race and racism. The ISRST's many projects include developing a consortium on Afro-Latin American Studies, a Philadelphia Blues People Project, semiological studies of indigeneity, a Black Civil Society project, symposia on race, sexuality, and sexual health, and ongoing work in Africana philosophy. Gordon was Executive Editor of volumes I-V of Radical Philosophy Review: Journal of the Radical Philosophy Association and co-editor of the Routledge book series on Africana philosophy. Additionally, he is President of the Caribbean Philosophical Association.

Gordon is the founder of the center for Afro-Jewish Studies, the only such research center, which focuses on developing and providing reliable sources of information on African and African Diasporic Jewish or Hebrew-descended populations. Gordon states: "In actuality, there is no such thing as pure Jewish blood. Jews are a creolized [mixed-race] people. It's been that way since at least the time we left Egypt as a [culturally] mixed Egyptian and African [i.e., from other parts of Africa] people."

Gordon founded the Second Chance Program at Lehman High School in the Bronx, New York. He is married to Jane Anna Gordon.

== Philosophy and work in theory ==
=== Black existentialism ===
Gordon is considered among the leading scholars in black existentialism. He first came to prominence in this subject because of his first book, Bad Faith and Antiblack Racism (1995), which was an existential phenomenological study of anti-black racism, and his anthology Existence in Black: An Anthology of Black Existential Philosophy (1997). The book is written in four parts, with a series of short chapters that at times take the form of phenomenological vignettes. Bad faith, as Gordon reads it, is a coextensive phenomenon reflective of the metastability of the human condition. It is a denial of human reality, an effort to evade freedom, a flight from responsibility, a choice against choice, an assertion of being the only point of view on the world, an assertion of being the world, an effort to deny having a point of view, a flight from displeasing truths to pleasing falsehoods, a form of misanthropy, an act of believing what one does not believe, a form of spirit of seriousness, sincerity, an effort to disarm evidence (a Gordon innovation), a form of sedimented or institutional version of all of these, and (another Gordon innovation) a flight from and war against social reality. Gordon rejects notions of disembodied consciousness (which he argues are forms of bad faith) and articulates a theory of the body-in-bad-faith. Gordon also rejects authenticity discourses. He sees them as trapped in expectations of sincerity, which also is a form of bad faith. He proposes, instead, critical good faith, which he argues requires respect for evidence and accountability in the social world, a world of intersubjective relations.

=== The question of racism ===
Racism, Gordon argues, requires the rejection of another human being's humanity. Since the other human being is a human being, such a rejection is a contradiction of reality. A racist must, then, deny reality, and since communication is possible between a racist and the people who are the object of racial hatred, then social reality is also what is denied in racist assertions. A racist, then, attempts to avoid social reality. Gordon argues that since people could only "appear" if embodied, then racism is an attack on embodied realities. It is an effort to make embodied realities bodies without points of view or make points of views without bodies. Racism is also a form of the spirit of seriousness, by which Gordon means the treatment of values as material features of the world instead of expressions of human freedom and responsibility. Racism ascribes to so-called racially inferior people intrinsic values that emanate from their flesh. A result of the spirit of seriousness is racist rationality. Here, Gordon, in agreement with Frantz Fanon, argues that racists are not irrational people but instead hyper-rational expressions of racist rationality. He rejects, in other words, theories that regard racism as a function of bad emotions or passions. Such phenomena, he suggests, emerge as a consequence of racist thinking, not its cause. Effect emerges, in other words, to affect how one negotiates reality. If one is not willing to deal with time, a highly emotional response squeezes all time into a single moment, which leads to the overflow of what one prefers to believe over what one is afraid of facing.

=== Theology and history-ethics ===
Gordon argues that in theological form, studies of anti-black racism reveal that a particular assumption of Western ethical thought must be rejected – the notion of similarity as a condition of ethical obligation. That black woman could worship a god with whom they are neither similar nor could ever be identical demonstrates that love does not require similarity. Gordon argues that the ethical issue against anti-black racism is not one of seeing the similarity between blacks and whites but of being able, simply, to respect and see the ethical importance of blacks as blacks. The fight against racism, in other words, does not require the elimination of race or noticing the racial difference but instead demands to respect the humanity of the people who exemplify racial difference. In Existence in Black, Gordon outlines themes of black existentialism in the text's introduction. He argues that black existentialism addresses many of the same themes of European existentialism but with some key differences. For instance, although both sets argue that the notion of a human being makes no sense outside of human communities and that individuals make no sense without society and societies make no sense without individuals, European existentialists had to defend individuality more because they were normative in their societies, whereas black existentialists had to focus on community more in order to demonstrate their membership in the human community. The question of individuality for black existentialists becomes one of showing that not all black people are the same. Themes of anguish, dread, freedom, absurdity, and death are examined, as well, through the historical reality of anti-black racism and colonialism and, along with it, the meaning of black suffering and the legitimacy of black existence. The logic of anti-black racism demands blacks offering justifications for their existence that are not posed for whites.

Gordon argues that black existential philosophy is an area of thought, which means that contributions to its development can come from anyone who understands its problematics. Existence in Black reflects his point since it has articles by other authors from a variety of racial and ethnic backgrounds discussing themes ranging from African and Afro-Caribbean existential struggles with beliefs in predestination to black feminist struggles with postmodern anti-essentialist thought. Gordon's chapter in the book focuses on the problem of black invisibility, which he points out is paradoxical since it is a function of black people being hyper-visible.

Gordon's place in this area of thought was solidified in 2000 with the publication of his book Existentia Africana: Understanding Africana Existential Thought. That book explores themes of existence—which he points out, from its Latin etymology, means to stand out or to appear—over the course of examining a set of new philosophical themes that emerge from their convergence with realities faced by African diasporic peoples.

=== Phenomenology and colonialism ===
Gordon is also known as the founder of postcolonial phenomenology and the leading proponent of Africana phenomenology which has enabled him to make a mark in Fanon Studies. Gordon was able to develop postcolonial phenomenology, which he sometimes refers to as Africana phenomenology or de-colonial phenomenology, through making a series of important innovations to Husserlian and Sartrian phenomenologies. The first, and perhaps most important, is his transformation of parenthesizing and bracketing of the natural attitude into what he calls "ontological suspension". Although Husserl called for a suspension of the natural attitude, his goal was primarily epistemological. Gordon's interest is, however, primarily concerned with errors that occur from inappropriate ontological assertions. He is also concerned with metaphysics, which he, unlike many contemporary thinkers, does not reject. Instead, he sees the continuation of Aristotelian metaphysics, which advances a notion of substance that is governed by the essence that leads to the definition in the form of essential being, as a problem. Gordon wants to talk about the social world and the meanings constructed by it without reducing it to a physicalist ontology. The notion of ontological suspension, which he claims is compatible with Husserlian phenomenology, advances this effort. He also advances phenomenology as a form of radically self-reflective thought, which means that it must question even its methodological assumptions. Because of this, it must resist epistemological colonization, and it is in this sense that phenomenology is itself postcolonial or decolonizing. Because of this, Gordon refused for some time in his career to refer to his work as "philosophy," for that would mean colonizing it with a disciplinary set of assumptions. He preferred to call his work "radical thought," which for him meant being willing to go to the roots of reality in a critical way. From these moves, Gordon was able to generate a set of theoretical concepts that have become useful to those who have adopted his theoretical lexicon: his unique formulation of crisis; his theory of epistemic closure; his theory of disciplinary decadence and teleological suspension of disciplinarity; and his analysis of maturation and tragedy.

Most of these ideas first emerged in Fanon and the Crisis of European Man: An Essay on Philosophy and the Human Sciences (1995). Gordon introduced a new stage in Fanon studies by announcing that he was not interested in writing on Fanon but instead working with Fanon on the advancement of his (Gordon's) own intellectual project. Gordon has also made an important contribution to the understanding around the work of Steve Biko by way of a new introduction to Biko's classic text I Write What I Like.

=== Essentialism and race ===
For some scholars, essentialism means that one cannot study race and racism and colonialism properly because they, in effect, lack essences. Gordon argues that although human beings are incomplete, are without laws of nature, it does not follow that they cannot be studied and understood with reasonable accuracy. Drawing upon the thought of Max Weber, Edmund Husserl, Alfred Schutz, and Frantz Fanon, Gordon argued that the task is to develop accurate portrayals or to thematize everyday life. He argues that racism and colonialism are everyday phenomena and, as such, are lived as "normal" aspects of modern life. Even under severe conditions, human beings find ways to live as though under ordinary conditions. This ordinariness can get to a point of distorting reality. In the case of racism, one group of people are allowed to live an ordinary life under ordinary conditions while another group or other groups are expected to do so under extraordinary conditions. Institutional bad faith renders those extraordinary conditions invisible and advances as a norm the false notion a shared ordinary set of conditions. This is the meaning behind the colloquial notion of "double standards". Gordon here also advances a theory that provides an answer to social constructivists in the study of race. What they fail to understand, Gordon argues, is that sociality is also constructed, which makes social constructivism redundant.

Gordon's writings have continued expansion of his and related philosophical approaches and lexicon. In his book of social criticism, Her Majesty's Other Children: Sketches of Racism from a Neocolonial Age (1997), he explored problems in critical race theory and philosophy and introduced one of his most famous thought experiments. In the chapter "Sex, Race, and Matrices of Desire", Gordon purports to have created a racial-gender-sex-sexuality matrix and used it to challenge our assumptions of the mixture. A white woman in that matrix, for instance, is mixed because her whiteness makes her masculine but her womanness makes her black. Or certain relationships are transformed, where same-sex interracial relationships are not necessarily homosexual or lesbian ones. What is striking about the book is a theme that some of his critics noticed in his earlier books, and that is the role of music in his prose and analysis. Gordon here builds on his argument about the everyday in his earlier work to argue that danger of most theories of social transformation is that they fail to take seriously the aesthetic dimensions of everyday life. Moral and political thought and economy are good at constructing contexts in which people could sustain biological and social life, but they are terrible at articulating what it means to live in a livable world. Gordon argues that a genuinely emancipatory society creates spaces for the ordinary celebration of everyday pleasure. In his more recent work, Gordon has been arguing about the geography of reason and the importance of contingency in social life. However, it needs to be noted that the legitimacy of his "mixture-matrix" is largely dependent upon his controversial applications of semiotics to race and gender.

=== Reason and rationality ===
A problem of Western thought, Gordon argues, is that it has yoked reason to instrumental rationality and created an antiblack notion of reason's geographical landscape. Shifting the geography of reason, he argues, would entail a war on the kinds of decadence that treat any human community as incapable of manifesting reason. But more, Gordon argues that reason is broader than rationality since it must be used to assess rationality. Rationality could only attempt to impose consistency on reason, but the reason could point out that maximum consistency, although rational, may be unreasonable. Gordon's recent work has been a development of these issues. His co-edited books with Jane Anna Gordon, Not Only the Master's Tools: African-American Studies in Theory and Practice (2005) and A Companion to African-American Studies (2006), offer some important new concepts in the ongoing development of his thought. In the first, he offers a comprehensive treatment of African-American philosophy and the importance of Africana existential phenomenological thought through a critique of Audre Lorde's admonition of using the master's tools. The two Gordons' response is that (1) tools should not only be used to tear down houses but also to build them up; (2) the master's tools are not the only tools available; and (3) the construction of alternative houses (theoretical models, philosophies) could decenter the value of the master's house, denuding it of mastery. In his essay "African-American Philosophy, Race, and Racism", which is his main contribution in that volume, he provides a comprehensive and concise statement of his work to date. In the introduction to the Companion, he and Jane Gordon formulate a theory of African-American Studies as a form of double consciousness. But the key here is the introduction of their concept "the pedagogical imperative". This imperative refers to a teacher's duty to learn and keep learning the broadest and most accurate picture of reality available to humankind. The editors also advance a theory of internationalism, localism, and market nihilism in the face of the rise of an independent managerial class to describe the dynamics of the contemporary academy.

== Classification of Gordon's contributions to sociology and philosophy ==
Gordon considers all of his works to be part of a humanist tradition. The role of intellectuals, in his view, is to challenge the limits of human knowledge and, in so doing, achieve some advancement in what he calls "the Geist war". For him, the importance of intellectual work could be summarized by his claim that one "achieves" as a human being for humanity but one always fails alone. Gordon's work has also been characterized as a form of existential sociology. The sociological dimensions of his writings have received much attention, and the readers of his book, Disciplinary Decadence: Living Thought in Trying Times (2006), have described it as a work that is not only in philosophy (of disciplinarity) but also in education and the sociology of the formations of disciplines themselves. Gordon, however, describes what he is attempting to do as a teleological suspension of disciplinarity.

== Published works ==
Gordon has produced approximately 400 articles, book chapters, and reviews. Books by Gordon currently in print are:

- Fear of Black Consciousness (Farrar, Straus, Giroux and Penguin Random House, 2022)
- Freedom, Justice, and Decolonization (Routledge 2021)
- Geopolitics and Decolonization: Perspectives from the Global South (ed. with Fernanda Frizzo Bragato) (Rowman & Littlefield International, 2018)
- La sud prin nord-vest: Reflecţii existenţiale afrodiasporice, trans. Ovidiu Tichindeleanu (Cluj, Romania: IDEA Design & Print, 2016)
- Journeys in Caribbean Thought: The Paget Henry Reader (ed. with Jane Anna Gordon, Lewis R. Gordon, Aaron Kamugisha, and Neil Roberts) (Rowman & Littlefield International, 2016)
- What Fanon Said: A Philosophical Introduction to his Life and Thought (Fordham University Press, 2015). Selected as Book of the Week in the Financial Mail (South Africa, December 17, 2015).
- La teoría política en la encrucijada descolonial, with Walter Mignolo, Alejandro de Oto, and Sylvia Wynter (Del Signo ediciones, 2009)
- Of Divine Warning: Reading Disaster in the Modern Age, with Jane Gordon (Paradigm Publishers, 2009)
- An Introduction to Africana Philosophy (Cambridge University Press, 2008)
- Disciplinary Decadence: Living Thought in Trying Times (Paradigm Publishers, 2006)
- A Companion to African American Studies (ed. with Jane Anna Gordon) (Blackwell, 2006). NetLibrary's e-book of the month for February 2007.
- Not Only the Master's Tools: African-American Studies in Theory and Practice (ed. with Jane Anna Gordon) (Paradigm Publishers, 2005)
- Existentia Africana: Understanding Africana Existential Thought (Routledge, 2000)
- Her Majesty's Other Children: Sketches of Racism from a Neocolonial Age (Rowman & Littlefield, 1997). Winner of Gustavus Myers Outstanding Book Award for the Study of Human Rights in North America.
- Existence in Black: An Anthology of Black Existential Philosophy, (ed.) (Routledge, 1997)
- Fanon: A Critical Reader (ed. with T. Denean Sharpley-Whiting and Renée T. White) (Blackwell, 1996)
- Fanon and the Crisis of European Man: An Essay on Philosophy and the Human Sciences (Routledge, 1995)
- Bad Faith and Antiblack Racism (Humanity Books, 1995/1999)

=== Online articles by Lewis Gordon ===
- Du Bois's Humanistic Philosophy of the Human Sciences, 2000
- A Philosophical Account of Africana Studies: An Interview with Lewis Gordon by Linda Martin Alcoff, 2003
- New Introduction to Steve Biko's I Write What I Like, 2005
- Africa-America Philosophy, Race and the Geography of Reason, 2006
- Through the Hellish Zone of Non-Being: Thinking Through Fanon, Disaster, and the Damned of the Earth, 2007
- The Market Colonization of Intellectuals,Truthout, 2010
- Of Illicit Appearance: The L.A. Riots/Rebellion as a Portent of Things to Come, Truthout, 12 May 2012
- Manifesto of transdisciplinarity. Lewis Gordon, "To not become slaves of knowledge of others", 2011 (original title: "Manifiesto de Transdiciplinariedad. Para no volvernos esclavos del conocimiento de otros"), in the student journal Trans-pasando Fronteras (URL visited 29 August 2012)

== See also ==
- Africana philosophy § List of Africana philosophers
