= Anita L. Allen =

American legal philosopher (born 1953)

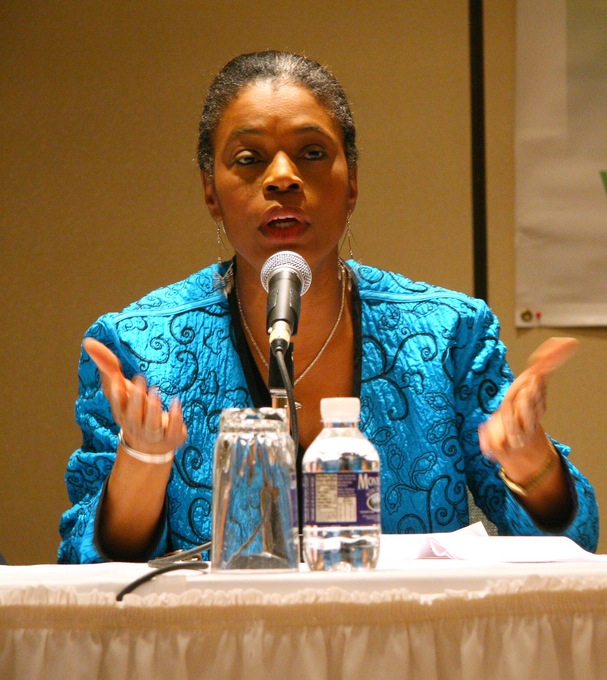
- Born: Anita LaFrance Allen; March 24, 1953 (age 73); Port Townsend, Washington, U.S.
- Other name: Anita L. Allen-Castellitto

Education
- Education: New College of Florida (BA); University of Michigan (MA, PhD); Harvard University (JD)
- Doctoral advisor: Richard Brandt

Philosophical work
- Era: Contemporary philosophy
- Region: Western philosophy
- School: Analytic
- Institutions: University of Pennsylvania Law School
- Main interests: Legal philosophy
- Notable ideas: Philosophy of privacy

Anita LaFrance Allen (also Allen-Castellitto; born March 24, 1953) is an American legal philosopher and the Henry R. Silverman Professor of Law and professor of philosophy at the University of Pennsylvania Law School. She was formerly Vice Provost for Faculty from 2013 to 2020.

She has been a senior fellow in the former bioethics department of the University of Pennsylvania Perelman School of Medicine, a collaborating faculty member in Africana Studies, and an affiliated faculty member in the gender, sexuality and women's studies program.

She is affiliated with the Leonard Davis Institute for Health Economics, the Warren Center, and the Center for Technology Innovation and Competition at Penn. She has been elected to the American Philosophical Society, the National Academy of Medicine, the American Law Institute, and the American Academy of Arts and Sciences. She served as President of the Eastern Division of the American Philosophical Association in 2018–19.

She won the Philip L. Quinn Prize of the American Philosophical Association in 2021, the organization's highest honor for service to Philosophers and Philosophy. In 2010, President Barack Obama named Allen to the Presidential Commission for the Study of Bioethical Issues. She is also a Hastings Center Fellow.

== Biography ==
Allen, was born in Fort Worden (Port Townsend, Washington). Her parents, Carrye Mae Allen (née Cloud) and Grover Cleveland Allen, were both natives of Atlanta, Georgia. Allen's father made a career in the United States Army, serving in both the Korean War and the Vietnam War. Her father was a member of "Operation Kapers," a squad of enlisted men who entertained combat soldiers in Korea with song, dance, and comedy. Allen spent her childhood living on military bases, including Fort Benning, Georgia, and Schofield Barracks, Hawaii.

Allen was one of six children, all of whom pursued careers in law, engineering, the military, or government service.

=== Marriage and family ===
A marriage in 1982 to artist Michael Kelly Williams of Detroit, Michigan ended in divorce. Allen was the model for Williams' woodcut, Afternoon of a Georgia Faun. An original version of the woodcut was printed at the printmaking workshop of Robert Blackburn and now is held in the permanent print collection of the Library of Congress in Washington, D.C.

In 1985, Allen married Paul Vincent Castellitto, a lawyer from Mount Vernon and New Rochelle, New York, who specialized in white-collar criminal defense law, and later became a college instructor specializing in ethics. The pair raised two children.

== Education ==
Allen graduated as an honor student from Baker High School in Columbus, Georgia, in 1970 in three years. Allen holds a B.A. from New College of Florida, on whose board of trustees she later served. Allen has twice delivered the commencement address at New College. While enrolled at New College, Allen spent a year studying in Italy and Germany. Under the direction of Professor Bryan Norton, she completed an undergraduate thesis on the philosophy of logical positivist Rudolf Carnap. She studied American Philosophy under Professor Gresham Riley.

Allen received her M.A. and Ph.D. in philosophy from the University of Michigan. Allen received training in analytic philosophy at the University of Michigan, where she also studied modern dance, alongside classmate Madonna.

Professor Richard Brandt, a noted proponent of moral utilitarianism, advised Allen's doctoral thesis, "Rights, Children and Education." Her dissertation examined Thomas Hobbes' and John Locke's theories of parental authority, and the moral ideal of a right to education. She argued for greater autonomy for children. Allen was one of the first African-American women to earn a PhD in philosophy, along with Angela Davis, Joyce Mitchell Cook, LaVerne Shelton, and Adrian Piper. She is the first African-American woman to hold both a J.D. and Ph.D. in philosophy.

Allen received her J.D. from Harvard Law School. While attending Harvard, Allen served as a teaching fellow for Professors Michael Sandel, Ronald Dworkin, Robert Nozick, and Sissela Bok. She worked as a summer law Associate at the Gaston Snow Ely Bartlett law firm in Boston and at Milbank, Tweed, Hadley & McCloy in New York.

== Honors and awards ==
Allen is one of several successful black professionals whose experiences and perspectives have been profiled in books including Laurel Holliday's Children of the Dream (2000), Ellis Cose's The Rage of a Privileged Class (1994), George Yancy's African American Philosophers: 17 Conversations (1998) and Elwood Watson: Outsiders Within (2008). She was featured in Carlin Romano's 2007 article, "A Challenge for Philosophy." Of her, he writes, "Penn's Anita Allen is at the top of her field, but she has serious concerns about its lack of openness and diversity."

In 2010 President Barack Obama appointed Allen to the Presidential Commission for the Study of Bioethical Issues. In 2016 Allen was elected to the National Academy of Medicine.

In 2014, Electronic Privacy Information Center awarded Allen the EPIC Lifetime Achievement Award and described her as "the nation's leading privacy scholar".

In 2017, Allen was elected vice president and president-elect of the Eastern Division of the American Philosophical Association, the first African American woman to hold the post in any division of the association. In 2019 Allen was elected to the American Academy of Arts and Sciences.

In 2019, Allen received an honorary doctorate from Tilburg University for her contributions to legal philosophy, women's rights, and diversity in higher education. In 2021, she received an honorary degree from the College of Wooster.

Allen was elected to the American Philosophical Society in 2022.

== Professional career ==
Prior to joining the Penn faculty, Allen was a professor and associate dean for research and scholarship at Georgetown University Law Center from 1987 to 1998, and an assistant professor of philosophy at Carnegie Mellon University from 1978 to 1981. She was the first African American woman to serve on the faculty of the University of Pittsburgh School of Law 1985 to 1987. She has been a visiting faculty member at Tel Aviv University, Waseda University Law School in Tokyo, Johns Hopkins School of Public Health, University of Washington, Hofstra Law School, University of Arizona College of Law, Princeton University, Yale Law School, Villanova University School of Law, and Harvard Law School. In 2022, she will be a visiting professor in the School of Government at Oxford. In 2023, she will be a distinguished visiting professor at Fordham Law School. In 2024, she will be the Hart Fellow at University College, Oxford, and will also deliver the H.L. A Hart Memorial Lecture.

Allen is an expert on privacy law, the philosophy of privacy, contemporary ethics and bioethics. She is also recognized for scholarship about legal philosophy, women's rights, and race relations.

She has received fellowships from Princeton's Program in Law and Public Affairs, the American Council of Learned Societies, the American Association of University Women, and the Ford Foundation.

Allen is a member of the Pennsylvania and New York bars. She briefly practiced law with Cravath, Swaine & Moore in New York City in 1984 and 1985.

Allen has served on the board of directors of several charities and professional associations, including the American Association for Practical and Professional Ethics, the Bazelon Center for Mental Health Law, the Electronic Privacy Information Center, the Hastings Center, the Maternity Care Coalition, the National Association for Women Lawyer's Judicial Evaluation Committee, and the West Philadelphia Alliance for Children. She was a member of the National Advisory Committee for Human Genome Research, and served on the IRB of the NIH Precision Medicine Initiative, ALL of US

Allen has been invited to lecture at colleges and universities across the United States and in Canada, Europe, Australia, Japan, Israel, and Taiwan. She has appeared on The Ethical Edge, 20/20, Nightline, Good Morning America, 60 Minutes, Face the Nation, Talk of the Nation, and other television and radio programs. She has written for the popular press, including O, the Oprah Magazine; the Daily Beast.com, and the Newark Star-Ledger .

== Bibliography ==
=== Books ===
- Allen, Anita L. (1988). Uneasy access: privacy for women in a free society.
- Allen, Anita L.; Regan, Jr., Milton C. (1998). Debating "Democracy's Discontent": essays on American politics, law, and public philosophy.
- Allen, Anita L.; Turkington, Richard C. (2002). Privacy law: cases and materials.
- Allen, Anita L. (2003). Why privacy isn't everything: feminist reflections on personal accountability.
- Allen, Anita L. (2004). The new ethics: a guided tour of the 21st century moral landscape.
- Allen, Anita L. (2011) [2007]. Privacy law and society.
- Allen, Anita L. (2011). Unpopular privacy: what must we hide?.

=== Chapters in books ===
- Allen, Anita L. (2005), "Forgetting yourself", in Cudd, Ann E.; Andreasen, Robin O. (eds.), Feminist theory: a philosophical anthology, Oxford, UK Malden, Massachusetts: Blackwell Publishing, pp. 352–364, ISBN 9781405116619.
