= Joel Michael Reynolds =

American moral philosopher

- Born: 30 November 1985 (age 40); Eugene, Oregon, United States of America

Education
- Education: Emory University (PhD in philosophy, 2017; MA in philosophy, 2014); Robert D. Clark Honors College, University of Oregon (BA in philosophy, religious studies, 2009)

Philosophical work
- Era: Contemporary philosophy
- Region: Western philosophy
- School: Phenomenology · Continental Philosophy
- Institutions: Georgetown University; Kennedy Institute of Ethics; The Hastings Center; University of Massachusetts Lowell
- Main interests: Applied ethics · Bioethics · Social Epistemology · Phenomenology (philosophy)
- Website: joelreynolds.me

Joel Michael Reynolds (born 1985) is an American philosopher whose research focuses on disability. Their areas of specialization include Philosophy of Disability, Bioethics, Continental Philosophy, and Social Epistemology. They are Provost's Distinguished Associate Professor of Philosophy and Disability Studies in the Department of Philosophy at Georgetown University, a Senior Research Scholar in the Kennedy Institute of Ethics, and director of Georgetown's Disability Studies Program. They are jointly appointed in Georgetown University’s School of Medicine and Medical Center as Faculty in the Pellegrino Center for Clinical Bioethics as well as in the Department of Family Medicine. In 2022, they were named a Faculty Scholar of The Greenwall Foundation and an Honorary Fellow of the McLaughlin College of Public Policy at York University. In 2023, they were elected as a Fellow of The Hastings Center for Bioethics. They are the founder and editor-in-chief of the Journal of Philosophy of Disability, the first journal devoted to the field. They are also co-founder and co-editor of Oxford Studies in Disability, Ethics, & Society with Rosemarie Garland-Thomson, the first book series from Oxford University Press to focus on disability and ethics. Their work has appeared or been cited in outlets including TIME, The Atlantic, The New Yorker, The Wall Street Journal, National Post, Truthout, and AEON.

Reynolds is the author or co-editor of a number of books, including The Life Worth Living: Disability, Pain, and Morality (University of Minnesota Press, May 2022), The Disability Bioethics Reader (Routledge, 2022) with Christine Wieseler, Disability Justice in Public Health Emergencies (Routledge, 2024) with Mercer Gary, The Art of Flourishing: Conversations on Disability (Oxford University Press, 2025) with Erik Parens, Liz Bowen, and Rosemarie Garland-Thomson, The Meaning of Disability (Oxford University Press, under contract), and Philosophy of Disability: An Introduction (Polity, under contract). They are also co-editor of a special issue of The Hastings Center Report, “For All of Us? On the Weight of Genomic Knowledge” (2020), with Erik Parens and of a special issue of Puncta, "Fits and Misfits: Rethinking Disability, Debility, and World with Merleau-Ponty" (2024), with Gail Weiss.

They earned their B.A. in philosophy as well as religious studies from the Robert D. Clark Honors College at the University of Oregon and their M.A. and Ph.D. from Emory University. They have received fellowships and grants from the National Endowment for the Humanities, the Greenwall Foundation, the Andrew W. Mellon Foundation, and the Howard Hughes Medical Institute. Reynolds previously taught at The University of Massachusetts Lowell; They held the inaugural Rice Family Postdoctoral Fellowship in Bioethics and the Humanities at The Hastings Center from 2017 to 2020; and they held the inaugural Laney Graduate School Disability Studies Fellowship at Emory University from 2014 to 2015. At the University of Oregon, Reynolds won the George Rebec Prize for best essay by a philosophy student in 2007, 2008, and 2009. Also in 2009, they won the President's Award from the Robert D. Clark Honor's College for Distinguished Thesis.
