= Lisa M. Given =

Canadian-Australian scholar of information studies

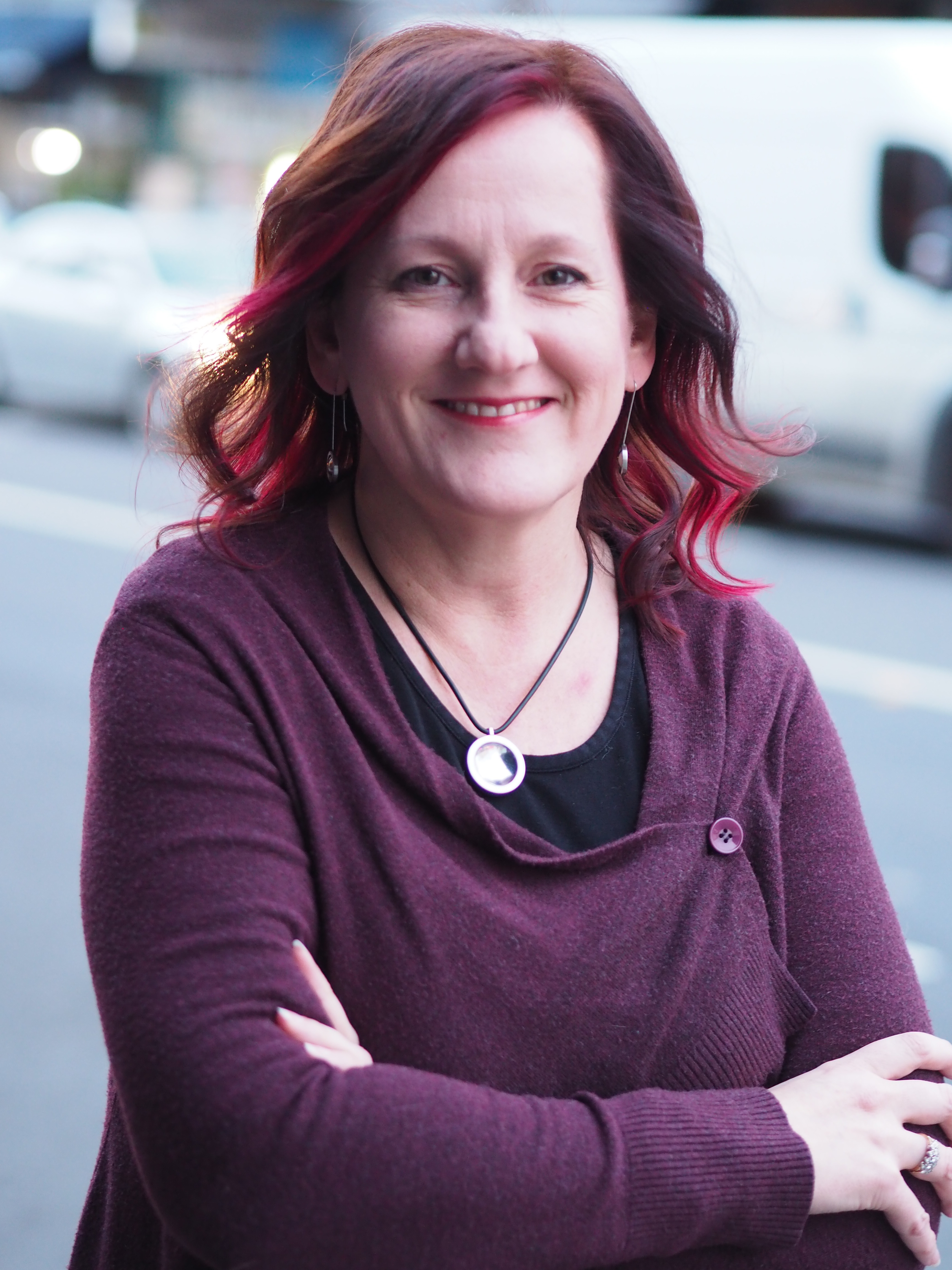
- Born: 1970 (age 55–56)
- Education: University of Western Ontario
- Scientific career
- Thesis: The social construction of the 'mature student' identity : effects and implications for academic information behaviours (2000)

Lisa Mae Given FASSA is a Canadian-Australian information studies academic. She is currently Director, Social Change Enabling Impact Platform and Professor of Information Sciences at RMIT University in Melbourne, Australia. She is Editor-in-Chief of the Annual Review of Information Science and Technology.

== Education ==
After a B.A. Hons in English, a B.Ed., and an MLIS from the University of Western Ontario, Given completed a PhD titled The social construction of the 'mature student' identity: effects and implications for academic information behaviours, also from UWO.

== Academic career ==
Given held multiple roles at University of Alberta and Charles Sturt University before moving to Swinburne University of Technology to serve as Dean, Research and Development from 2017 to 2021. In 2022, she began in her current role as Director, Social Change Enabling Capability Platform and Professor of Information Sciences at RMIT University. While in Canada, she served as Director, International Institute for Qualitative Methodology from 2007 to 2009, where she was awarded lifetime status as a Distinguished Scholar in 2010.

A former member of the Australian Research Council's College of Experts (2011-2014), Given has served on several Boards of Directors, including: President of the Association for Information Science and Technology (ASIS&T) from 2017 to 2018; President of the Canadian Association for Information Science (CAIS) from 2006 to 2007; and Secretary/Treasurer for the Association for Library and Information Science Education (ALISE) from 2006 to 2009. She also served as a Panel Member for Canada's Interagency Advisory Panel on Research Ethics (2010-2012) and a member of the Expert Panel on Research Integrity for the Council of Canadian Academies.

== Selected awards ==
- 2022 Fellow of the Academy of the Social Sciences in Australia
- 2021 Association for Information Science and Technology, SIG-USE Outstanding Contributions to Information Behavior Research Award
- 2021 Association for Information Science and Technology, SIG-USE Academy Fellow
- 2021 Swinburne University of Technology, Vice-Chancellor's Engagement Award - Community Engagement Team Award (co-awardee, Dr Wade Kelly)
- 2017 Canadian Association for Information Science - Overall Best Conference Paper Award for Interviews that attend to emplacement: The ‘walk-through’ method (co-authors, Sarah Polkinghorne and Lauren Carlson)
- 2015 Charles Sturt University, Vice-Chancellor's Award for Research Supervision Excellence
- 2010 University of Alberta, Martha Cook Piper Research Prize
- 2010 University of Western Ontario, Young Alumni Award of Merit
- 2010 Association for Library and Information Science Education (ALISE) – Methodology Paper Award for Visual Traffic Sweeps (VTS): A research method for mapping user activities in the library space (co-author, Heather Archibald)
- 2004 University of Alberta, Coutts-Clarke Research Fellowship
- 2002 Association for Library and Information Science Education (ALISE) – Methodology Paper Award for Data preparation using the principles of knowledge organization: A guiding model for quantitative, qualitative, and textual research methodologies (co-author, Hope A. Olson)

== Selected works ==
- Polkinghorne, S., & Given, L.M. (2021). Holistic information research: From rhetoric to paradigm. Journal of the Association for Information Science and Technology. https://doi.org/10.1002/asi.24450
- Ward, W., & Given, L.M. (2019). Assessing intercultural communication: Testing technology tools for information sharing in multinational research teams. Journal of the Association for Information Science and Technology 70(4): 338–350. https://doi.org/10.1002/asi.24159
- Given, L.M., & Willson, R. (2018). Information technology and the humanities scholar: Documenting digital research practices. Journal of the Association for Information Science and Technology 69(6):807-819. https://doi.org/10.1002/asi.24008
- Given, L.M. (2016). 100 questions (and answers) about qualitative research. SAGE Publications. Thousand Oaks
- Case, D. O., & Given, L. M. (2016). Looking for information: A survey of research on information seeking, needs, and behavior (4th ed.). Emerald Group Publishing. Bingley
- Leckie, G.J., Given, L.M., & Buschman, J. (2010) Critical theory for library and information science: Exploring the social from across the disciplines. Libraries Unlimited/ABC-Clio. Santa Barbara
- Given, L. M., & Archibald, H. (2015). Visual traffic sweeps (VTS): A research method for mapping user activities in the library space. Library and Information Science Research 37(2):100-108. https://doi.org/10.1016/j.lisr.2015.02.005
- Given, L. M. (Ed.). (2008). The Sage encyclopedia of qualitative research methods. SAGE Publications. Chicago
- Sadler, E., & Given, L. M. (2007). Affordance theory: a framework for graduate students' information behavior. Journal of Documentation, 63(1), 115–141.
- Given, L. M., & Leckie, G. J. (2004). "Sweeping" the library: Mapping the social activity space of the public library. Library & information science research, 25(4), 365–385.
- Given, L. M., & Olson, H.A. (2003). Knowledge organization in research: A conceptual model for organizing data. Library & Information Science Research 25(2):157-176. https://doi.org/10.1016/s0740-8188(03)00005-7
- Given, L. M. (2002). The academic and the everyday: Investigating the overlap in mature undergraduates' information–seeking behaviors. Library & information science research, 24(1), 17–29.

== Selected Media ==
- Given, Lisa M. 2021. “Facebook’s news is gone. Here’s where to turn for trusted information.” The Conversation.
- Forcier, Eric and Lisa M. Given. 2019. “After 8 years of memes, videos and role playing, what now for Game of Thrones’ multimedia fans.” The Conversation.
- Ankeny, Rachel and Lisa M. Given. 2018. “Creating research value needs more than just science – arts, humanities, social sciences can help.” The Conversation.
