= Jack Reynolds (philosopher) =

Australian philosopher

- Awards: Fellow of the Australian Academy of Humanities

Philosophical work
- Era: 21st-century philosophy
- Region: Western philosophy
- Institutions: Deakin University

Jack Alan Reynolds is an Australian philosopher and professor of philosophy at Deakin University. He is known for his works on continental philosophy and is a Fellow of the Australian Academy of Humanities.

== Books ==
- Chronopathologies: Time and Politics in Deleuze, Derrida, Analytic Philosophy, and Phenomenology, Lexington Books, 2012
- Merleau-Ponty and Derrida: Intertwining Embodiment and Alterity, Ohio University Press, 2004
- Steven Churchill and Jack Reynolds (eds.), Jean-Paul Sartre: Key Concepts, Acumen, 2013
- Felicity Joseph, Jack Reynolds, and Ashley Woodward (eds.), The Continuum Companion to Existentialism, Continuum, 2011
- Jack Reynolds, James Chase, James Williams, and Edwin Mares (eds.), Postanalytic and Metacontinental: Crossing Philosophical Divides, Continuum, 2010
- Rosalyn Diprose and Jack Reynolds (eds.), Merleau-Ponty: Key Concepts, Acumen, 2008
