= Kathryn Sophia Belle =

American philosopher (born 1978)

Kathryn Sophia Belle, formerly Kathryn T. Gines
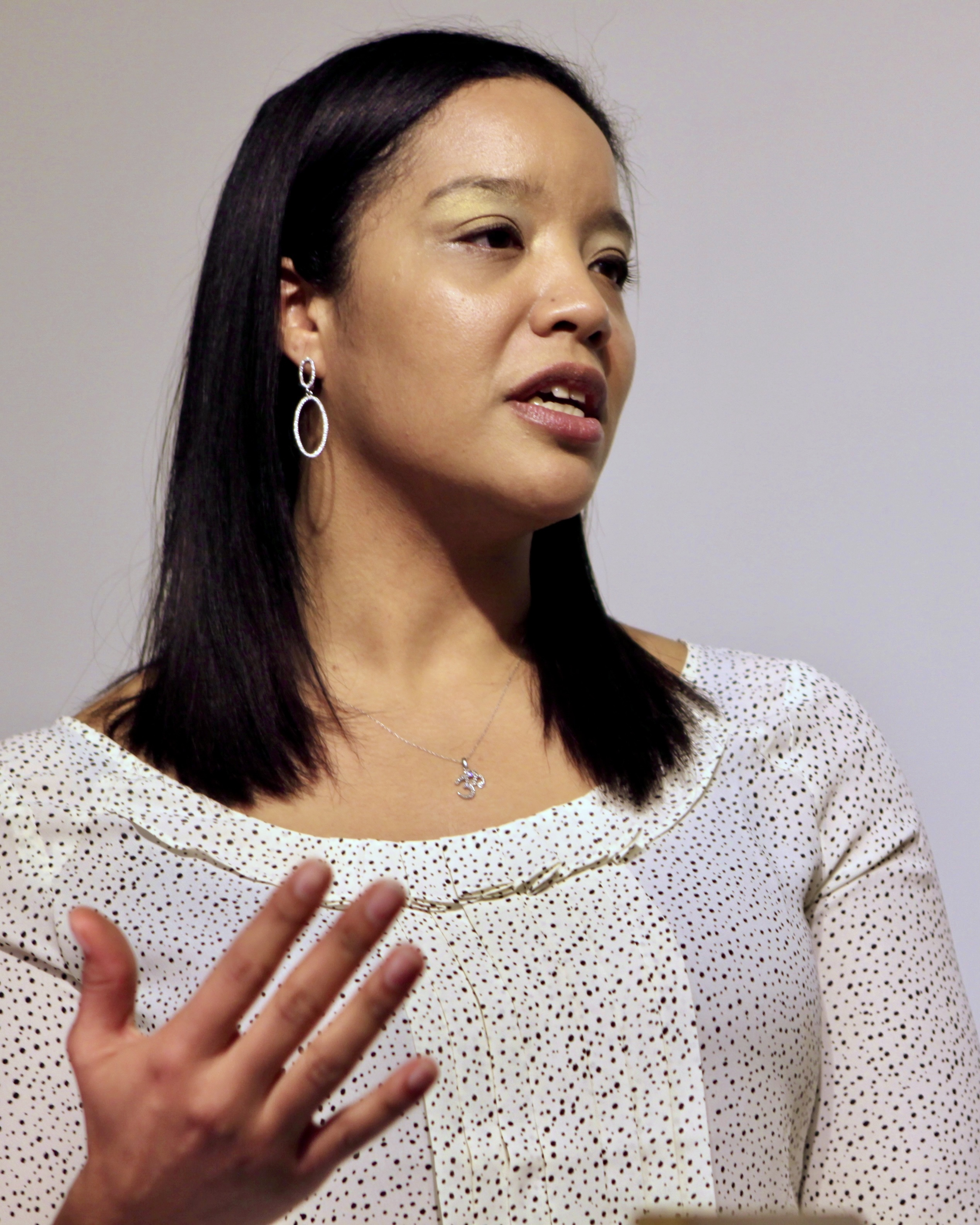
- Belle speaking at the University of San Francisco, February 21, 2014
- Born: 2 July 1978 (age 48)

Education
- Education: Spelman College; University of Memphis

Philosophical work
- Era: Contemporary philosophy
- School: Continental philosophy Africana philosophy
- Institutions: Pennsylvania State University
- Main interests: Diaspora studies, Africana philosophy, continental philosophy, black feminist philosophy, critical philosophy of race

Kathryn Sophia Belle, formerly known as Kathryn T. Gines (born 2 July 1978), is an American philosopher. She is associate professor of philosophy at Pennsylvania State University. Much of her work has focused on increasing diversity within philosophy, and she is the founding director of the Collegium of Black Women Philosophers.

== Education and career ==
Belle majored in philosophy at Spelman College and went on to receive a master's degree and a doctorate in philosophy from the University of Memphis in 2001 and 2003, respectively.

Belle has been at Pennsylvania State University since 2008. Prior to her appointment at Penn State, Belle was an assistant professor of Africana and diaspora studies at Vanderbilt University, with a cross-appointment in the department of philosophy.

=== Collegium of Black Women Philosophers ===
Belle founded the Collegium of Black Women Philosophers in 2007 to provide a positive place and support network for black women philosophers, and also to simply help identify how many black women were active as academic philosophers. At the time that Belle launched the Collegium, she was able to identify only 29 black women who were professors of philosophy in the United States, although the American Philosophical Association had more than 11,000 members. The Collegium's annual conference now hosts around thirty visiting Black women faculty and students of philosophy, offering a variety of professional development workshops and other tracks. Lucius Outlaw, writing in the Stanford Encyclopedia of Philosophy, suggests that Belle's efforts in founding the Collegium of Black Women Philosophers broke important new ground in advancing the field of Africana philosophy.

== Research and publications ==
Belle has written one book, Hannah Arendt and the Negro Question. She has also co-edited an anthology, Convergences: Black Feminism and Continental Philosophy. She has published numerous peer-reviewed papers, including pieces in journals such as Hypatia: A Journal of Feminist Philosophy, the Southern Journal of Philosophy, the Journal of Social Philosophy, and Sartre Studies International. She is also a founding co-editor of Critical Philosophy of Race, a journal published by the Penn State University Press that examines issues surrounding the concept of race.

Belle's primary areas of interest include Africana philosophy, continental philosophy, black feminist philosophy, critical philosophy of race. Much of Belle's research has focused on critical approaches to issues of race, racism, feminism, and intersectionality. She has written extensively from a critical perspective about the work of Hannah Arendt, arguing that Arendt failed to recognize that the "Negro question" was a "white problem", not a "Negro problem", and arguing further that the rigid distinctions that Arendt saw between the social and the political stopped Arendt from being able to recognize that racism was a political phenomenon rather than just a social one.

In opposition to analytic philosophers, Belle argues that the existence of a unique, Black, female identity must be acknowledged if linked systems of oppression are ever to be overcome, and argues that the preservation of a unique and positive racial identity can be a critically empowering act. In Sartre, Beauvoir, and the Race/Gender Analogy: A Case for Black Feminist Philosophy (a piece Belle contributed to Convergences: Black Feminism and Continental Philosophy), Belle argues that the absence of Black feminist thought from continental philosophy has resulted in a significant void that has prevented continental analysis from coming to grips with how systems of oppression intersect and shape phenomenology.
