= Naomi Zack =

American philosopher

Philosophical work
- Era: 21st-century philosophy
- Region: Western philosophy
- School: Continental philosophy
- Institutions: University of Albany, University of Oregon, Lehman College
- Main interests: Critical race theory, philosophy of identity, feminist theory
- Notable ideas: Disaster ethics

Naomi Zack is a Professor of Philosophy at Lehman College, City University of New York, having formerly been a professor at the University of Albany and the University of Oregon. She has written thirteen books and three textbooks, and she has edited or co-edited five anthologies, in addition to publishing a large number of papers and book chapters, particularly in areas having to deal with race, feminism, and natural disasters. Zack has taken on a number of professional roles related to the representation of women and other under-represented groups in philosophy. Zack is also a member of the editorial boards of multiple journals, including Hypatia: A Journal of Feminist Philosophy, The Journal of Race and Policy, Ethnic Studies: an Interdisciplinary Journal of Culture, Race and Ethnicity, and the Radical Philosophical Review.

Zack was born in 1944 in Brooklyn, New York. Her mother was Jewish, and her father was Black and Native American.

== Education and career ==
Zack received her bachelor's degree from New York University in 1966, which she attended on a New York State Regents Scholarship, and where she became a member of Phi Beta Kappa. She completed her doctorate in philosophy at Columbia University in 1970, writing a dissertation on the epistemology of C. I. Lewis under Sidney Morgenbesser. She served as an adjunct assistant professor of philosophy at Rensselaer Polytechnic Institute for the 1990–91 school year, and accepted an appointment as an assistant professor of philosophy at the University of Albany in 1991. She accepted an appointment as an affiliated member in the Department of Women's Studies at the University of Albany in 1993, and was promoted to associate professor of philosophy in 1998. She was promoted to full professor for the 2000–1 school year (while she also served as the Director of the Doctor of Arts in Humanistic Studies Program), before accepting a position as Professor of Philosophy at the University of Oregon in 2001. In 2019 she joined the philosophy faculty of Lehman College. In 2019, she was awarded the 2019 Romanell - Phi Beta Kappa Professorship. Due to the COVID-19 pandemic, the Romanell lectures, entitled "A Philosophical View of Intersectionality", were postponed until 2022. In 2021, she was invited to give the John Dewey Lecture at the Pacific Division of the American Philosophical Association, entitled "Philosophy and Me".

== Bibliography ==
- Race and Mixed Race (1993)
- Bachelors of Science: Seventeenth Century Identity, Then and Now (1996)
- Thinking About Race (1998; 2005)
- Philosophy of Science and Race (2002)
- Inclusive Feminism: A Theory for the Third Wave (2005; 2009)
- Ethics for Disaster (2009); second edition (2023)
- The Handy Philosophy Answer Book (2010)
- The Big Book of Philosophy (2010)
- The Ethics and Mores of Race: Equality after the History of Philosophy (2011; 2015)
- Race and Ethnicity (2012)
- White Privilege and Black Rights: The Injustice of US Police Racial Profiling and Homicide (2015)
- Applicative Justice: A Pragmatic Empirical Approach to Racial Injustice (2016)
- Reviving the Social Compact: Inclusive Citizenship in an Age of Extreme Politics (2018)
- Philosophy of Race: An Introduction (2018); second edition (2023)
- Progressive Anonymity: From Identity Politics to Evidence-Based Government (2020)
- The American Tragedy of COVID-19 (2021)
- Ethics and Race: Past and Present Intersections and Controversies (2022)
- Democracy, A Very Short Introduction (2023)
- Intersectionality: A Philosophical Framework (2024)
- As editor:
  - American Mixed Race: Constructing Microdiversity (1995)
  - RACE/SEX: Their Sameness, Difference and Interplay (1997)
  - with Laurie Shrage and Crispin Sartwell, Race, Class, Gender and Sexuality: The Philosophical Questions (1998)
  - Women of Color and Philosophy: A Critical Reader (2000)
  - Oxford Handbook of Philosophy and Race (2017)

== Research areas ==
Zack's research has ranged broadly over such fields as philosophy of race, philosophy of identity, feminist theory, and the history of philosophy.

In Ethics for Disaster, Zack examined the social construction of disasters and attempted to produce a model of disasters and a cohesive set of "disaster ethics. Zack assumes an optimistic view of the social contract. Zack views governments not only as having an obligation to step in and assist after disaster has occurred, but also as having a positive obligation to plan for how to respond to likely types of disasters in advance. Zack views governments not as having an ethical obligation to provide their citizenry with the best assistance they can during a disaster scenario, but as having an obligation to provide them with the best assistance that the government could have potentially planned for. Zack also goes to great lengths to highlight the differences in how "disasters" are portrayed depending on the political, racial, and socio-economic class to which they occur.

In White Privilege and Black Rights: The Injustice of U.S. Police Racial Profiling and Homicide, Zack discusses civil rights, injustice, and restorative justice. Zack distinguishes between two ways of philosophizing about justice: treating justice as an ideal that can be defined and reasoned about (even if no real society in human history ever "fully instantiates or realizes an ideal of justice for all members of that society), and the other begins with injustice and seeks to understand and correct it. Zack invites people to think about black rights rather than white privilege, because oftentimes what is refused or taken away from black people is not white privilege but basic human rights.
