= Joy James =

American political philosopher, academic and author

- Education: Fordham University (PhD) post doctorate M.A. from Union Theological Seminary (New York City)
- Occupations: University professor and author
- Employer: Williams College
- Known for: Political philosophy, African American studies, feminist and critical race theory

Joy James (born 1958) is an American political philosopher, academic, and author. James is the Ebenezer Fitch Professor of the Humanities at Williams College. Her books include Transcending the Talented Tenth: Black Leaders and American Intellectuals, Shadowboxing, Imprisoned Intellectuals, The New Abolitionists, Resisting State Violence, In Pursuit of Revolutionary Love: Precarity, Power, Communities and The Angela Y. Davis Reader. She was a Senior Research Fellow at the John L. Warfield Center for African and African American Studies at the University of Texas at Austin, where she developed the Harriet Tubman Digital Repository.

== Career ==
James worked closely with Angela Davis, who was on the faculty, during a post-doctoral fellowship at the University of California, Santa Cruz. James edited The Angela Y. Davis Reader, emphasizing Davis's liberation theory and democratic praxis.

James has held positions as a faculty member at the University of Massachusetts Amherst (1990–96); as associate professor in the department of ethnic studies at the University of Colorado Boulder (1997–2000), where she also served as the director at the Center for the Study of Race and Ethnicity in America (1998); as distinguished visiting scholar at the Institute for Research in African-American Studies at Columbia University (1999–2000); and as professor of Africana studies at Brown University (2000–2005).

James authored Shadowboxing: Representations of Black Feminist Politics through St. Martin's Press in 1991. The book synthesized theories of social movements with cultural and social politics as well as spotlighted images of black female agency and intellectualism in various political contexts. In 1996, James released her second book, Resisting State Violence: Radicalism, Gender, and Race in U.S. Culture, via University of Minnesota Press.

In 2005, she joined the faculty at Williams College. Joy James has worked with Black feminist academics to form the Black Internationalists Unions as a form of abolitionism that fights anti-black regimes.

In 2013, Seeking the Beloved Community: A Feminist Race Reader was released. The book was written over twenty years, with essays that describe the tensions confronted by writers, scholars, activists, politicians, and political prisoners fighting racism and sexism.

In Pursuit of Revolutionary Love: Precarity, Power, Communities, published by Divided Publishing, focuses on Love in various types of communities. The book includes a foreword by Da'Shaun L. Harrison and an afterword by Mumia Abu-Jamal.

In 2023, New Bones Abolition: Captive Maternal Agency and the Afterlife of Erica Garner was published by Common Notions. The book details a year spent addressing the legacy of Erica Garner, the daughter of Eric Garner. Essays include frameworks for inspired abolitionist organizing and risk-taking. The book looks at "those of us broken enough to grow new bones" and the new traditions we inherit and renew in the struggle for freedom. James introduces the concept of a figure called the "captive maternal": from Mamie Till-Mobley, the mother of Emmett Till, to the incarcerated at Attica prison in 1971, to Erica Garner, the captive maternal is rarely celebrated in African-American history and United States history.

== Works ==
- James, Joy. In Pursuit of Revolutionary Love: Precarity, Power, Communities. Divided Publishing December 2022. ISBN 978-1-7398431-0-6
- James, Joy. "Airbrushing Revolution for the Sake of Abolition". Black Perspective. July 20, 2020.
- James, Joy. "Presidential Powers and Captive Maternals: Sally, Michelle, and Deborah", APABlog, May 6, 2020.
- James, Joy. "Killmonger's Captive Maternal Is M.I.A: Black Panther's Family Drama, Imperial Masters and Portraits of Freedom" in Reading Wakanda: Black Radical Imaginations with Hollywood Fantasies. Southern California Library. May 1, 2019.
- James. Joy. "DO SOMETHING ETHICAL: Critical Thinking, Theorizing, and Political Will", pp. 183–193. George Yancy, editor, Educating for critical consciousness. New York, NY: Routledge, Taylor & Francis Group, 2019.
- James, Joy. The Womb of Western theory: trauma, time theft, and the captive maternal. Carceral Notebooks. Challenging the punitive society. v12, 2016.
- James, Joy, Silvia Federici, Kelly Fritsch, Clare O'Connor, and A K. Thompson. Keywords for Radicals: The Contested Vocabulary of Late-Capitalist Struggle. Edinburgh: AK Press, 2016.
- James, Joy. Seeking the Beloved Community: A Feminist Race Reader. : State University of New York Press, 2014, ISBN 978-1-4-3844632-5.
- James, Joy. Warfare in the American homeland: policing and prison in a penal democracy. Duke University Press, 2007.
- James, Joy. The New Abolitionists: (Neo)Slave Narratives and Contemporary Prison Writings. Albany: State University of New York Press, 2005.
- James, Joy. Imprisoned Intellectuals: America's Political Prisoners Write on Life, Liberation, and Rebellion. Lanham, Md: Rowman & Littlefield, 2003.
- James, Joy. 2003. High-Tech lynching and low-profile rapes. Basingstoke: Palgrave.
- James, Joy. States of Confinement: Policing, Detention, and Prisons. New York: Palgrave, 2002.
- James, Joy. Shadowboxing: Representations of Black Feminist Politics. New York: St. Martin's Press, 1999.
- Davis, Angela Y., and Joy James. 1998. The Angela Y. Davis reader. Oxford: Blackwell.
- James, Joy. Transcending the Talented Tenth: Race Leaders and American Intellectualism. New York: Routledge, 1997.
- James, Joy. 1996. Resisting state violence: radicalism, gender, and race in U.S. culture. Minneapolis, Minn: University of Minnesota Press.
- James, Joy. Spirit, space & survival: African American women in (white) academe. New York: Routledge, 1993.
