= Africana philosophy =

Area of study within Africana studies

Africana philosophy is the work of philosophers of African descent and others whose work deals with the subject matter of the African diaspora. The name does not refer to a particular philosophy, philosophical system, method, or tradition. Rather, Africana philosophy is a third-order, metaphilosophical, umbrella-concept used to bring organizing oversight to various efforts of philosophizing. Africana philosophy is a part of and developed within the field of Africana studies.

== Overview ==
Africana philosophy is a part of and developed within the field of Africana studies. Africana philosophy includes the philosophical ideas, arguments, and theories of particular concern to people of African descent. Some of the topics explored by Africana philosophy include pre-Socratic African philosophy and modern-day debates discussing the early history of Western philosophy, post-colonial writing in Africa and the Americas, black resistance to oppression, black existentialism in the United States, and the meaning of "blackness" in the modern world.

Lucius Outlaw states:

"Africana philosophy" is very much a heuristic notion—that is, one that suggests orientations for philosophical endeavors by professional philosophers and other intellectuals devoted to matters pertinent to African and African-descended persons and peoples.

Professional philosophers in the areas of ethics, social philosophy, political philosophy, philosophy of biology, semantics, critical race theory, and postcolonialism are currently exploring Africana philosophy. The American Philosophical Association has 10,000 members in North America. It is estimated that only 100 of its members in North America are of African descent.

Lewis Gordon states:

Africana philosophy is a species of Africana thought, which involves the theoretical questions raised by critical engagements with ideas in Africana cultures and their hybrid, mixed, or creolized forms worldwide. Since there was no reason for the people of the African continent to have considered themselves African until that identity was imposed upon them through conquest and colonization in the modern era... this area of thought also refers to the unique set of questions raised by the emergence of "Africans" and their diaspora here designated by the term "Africana"... Africana philosophy refers to the philosophical dimensions of this area of thought.

== List of scholarly journals ==
- Philosophia Africana

== See also ==
- African philosophy
- Black existentialism
- Double consciousness
- Black theology
- Africana womanism
