= List of University of Michigan Law School alumni =

The list of University of Michigan Law School alumni includes notable alumni of University of Michigan Law School.

== Alphabetized list ==
=== A-D ===
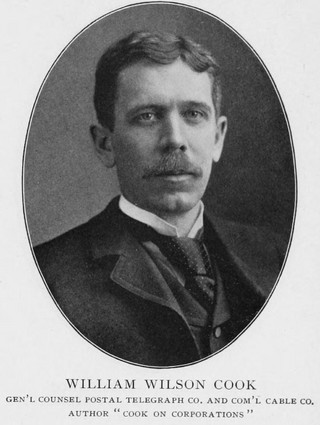
William W. Cook

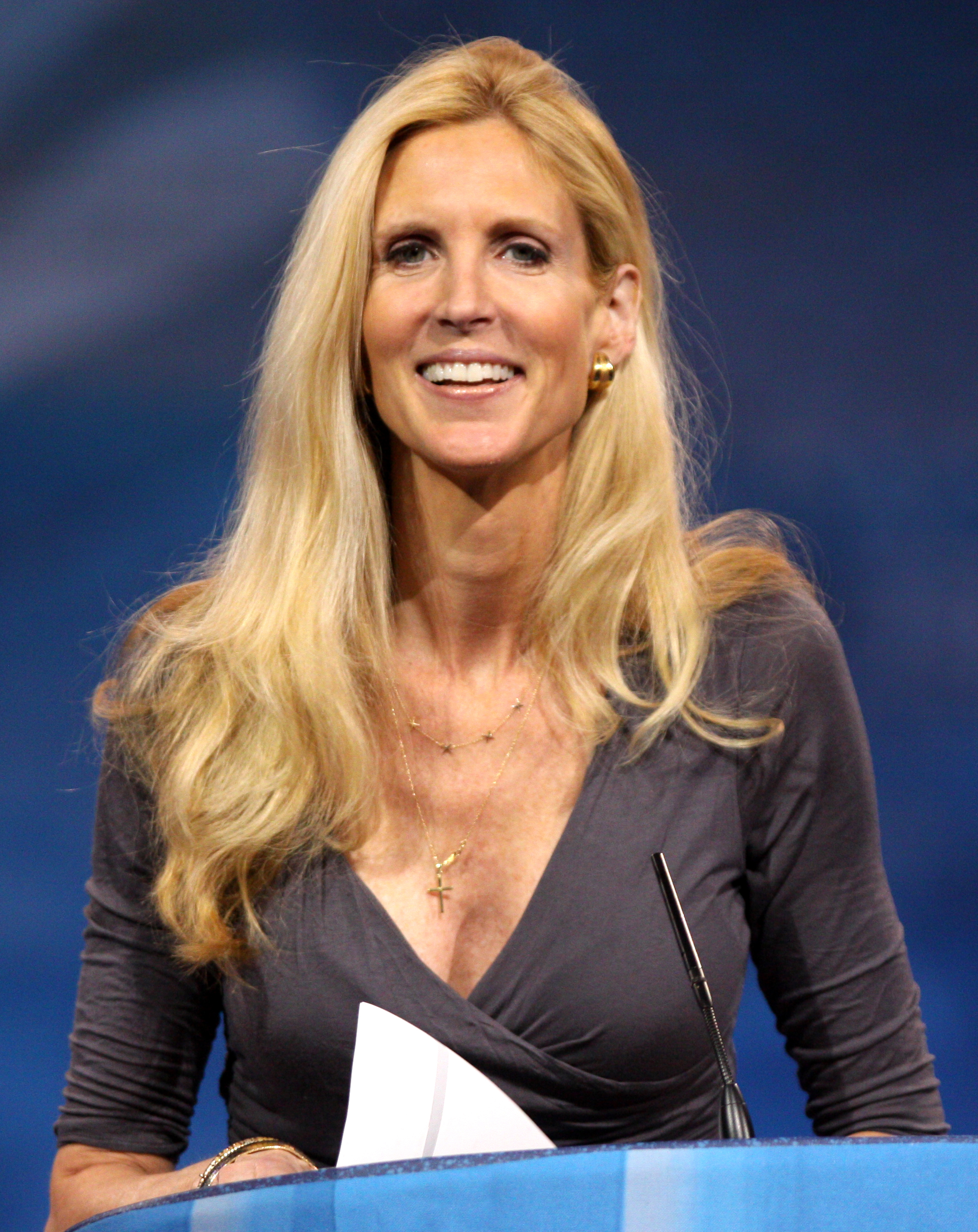
Ann Coulter

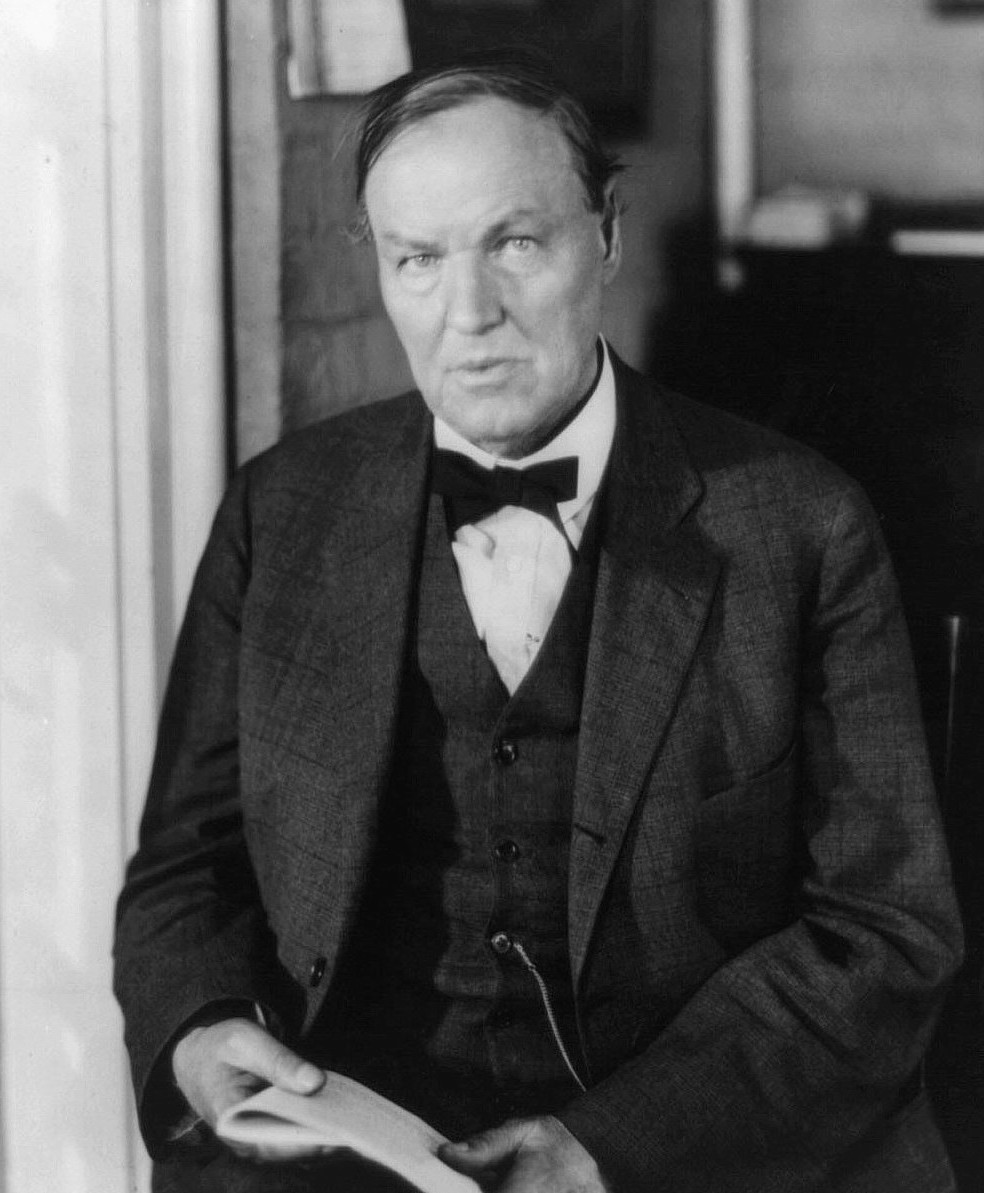
Clarence Darrow

- Ralph W. Aigler (J.D. 1907), expert on property; member of U-M faculty, 1910–1954; inducted into the University of Michigan Athletic Hall of Honor
- Gideon Winans Allen (LAW 1864), Wisconsin State Assemblyman
- Ronald J. Allen (J.D. 1973), Northwestern University John Henry Wigmore Professor of Law, one of only four Americans to be designated as a Yangtze River Scholar (China's highest academic award, formerly only for Nobel laureates) in 2007; the first law professor to receive the award, which usually goes to scientists or economists
- Justin Amash (J.D. 2005), U.S. congressman from Michigan, 2011–2021
- Edgardo Angara (LL.M. 1964), former president of the University of the Philippines; Senate president of the Philippines
- George Ariyoshi (J.D. 1952), third governor of Hawaii (1974–1986)
- Susanne Baer (LL.M. 1993), elected to the German Federal Constitutional Court in February 2011
- Melody Barnes (J.D. 1989), director of the president's Domestic Policy Council
- Charles J. Beerstecher (LL.B. 1870), delegate to California's Second Constitutional Convention, member of the California Railroad Commission
- Mitchell N. Berman, professor of Law at the University of Pennsylvania Law School
- Mary Frances Berry (J.D. 1970), former chairwoman of the United States Commission on Civil Rights; current professor of history at the University of Pennsylvania
- Lester Bird (LL.B. 1959), prime minister of Antigua and Barbuda
- Henry Bodenstab (LL.B. 1898), Wisconsin state senator
- Heidi Bond (J.D.), bestselling author of historical romance novels under the pseudonym Courtney Milan
- Willard Lee Boyd (LAW: LL.M. 1952; S.J.D. 1962), president emeritus of University of Iowa, and its 15th president; chairman of the Association of American Universities, 1979–1980
- Steven G. Bradbury (J.D. 1988), former acting assistant attorney general (Office of Legal Counsel)
- Charles Henry Brown, speaker of the Vermont House of Representatives
- John Robert Brown (J.D. 1932), judge of the United States Court of Appeals for the Fifth Circuit, one of the "Fifth Circuit Four"
- Vernon A. Bullard (LL.B. 1884), United States attorney for the District of Vermont
- William J. Bulow (LL.B. 1893), U.S. senator from and governor of South Dakota
- Rousseau Angelus Burch (1885), justice of the Kansas Supreme Court
- Nicole (Niki) Burnham (J.D. 1994), author, RITA award winner
- Clarence A. Buskirk, 10th Indiana attorney general (1874–1878)
- Michael T. Cahill (1996), dean of Brooklyn Law School
- Llewellyn L. Callaway (LL.B. 1891), chief justice of the Montana Supreme Court
- David Francis Cargo (LL.B. 1957), governor of New Mexico, 1967–71; New Mexico State House of Representatives Albuquerque (1963–67)
- Roger Carter (LL.M., 1968), dean of University of Saskatchewan College of Law; recipient of Order of Canada
- Avern Cohn (J.D. 1949), judge, United States District Court for the Eastern District of Michigan
- William W. Cook (JD 1882), heavily published and cited author of textbooks on corporate law; donor of the quadrangle to Michigan
- Ann Coulter (J.D. 1988), political personality, author
- Mike Cox (J.D. 1989), Michigan attorney general, 2003–2010
- Andrew Cray, LGBT rights activist and husband of Delaware state senator Sarah McBride
- George Crockett Jr. (LAW: 1934), civil rights activist; helped found the National Lawyers Guild; first African-American lawyer hired by the Department of Labor; recorder's court judge, Detroit, Michigan, 1966–74; U.S. House of Representatives (D-Mich.), 1991
- Byron Mac Cutcheon (LL.B. 1866), American Civil War officer; Medal of Honor recipient; politician from Michigan
- Clarence Darrow (attended), trial lawyer; defense counsel in the Scopes Monkey Trial and Leopold and Loeb case
- Harry M. Daugherty (LL.B. 1880), United States attorney general, 1921–24, Republican Party boss, member of the "Ohio Gang"
- William R. Day (LL.B. 1870), United States secretary of state, 1898; United States Supreme Court associate justice, 1903–1922
- Pat DeWine (JD 1994), associate justice of the Ohio Supreme Court, 2017–
- Donald McDonald Dickinson (LL.B. 1867), in 1887 appointed by Grover Cleveland as United States Postmaster General; served from January 6, 1888, until the end of Cleveland's first term in 1889
- Gershwin A. Drain (J.D.), district judge on the United States District Court for the Eastern District of Michigan
- Mike Duggan (J.D. 1983), incumbent and 75th mayor of Detroit, Michigan, serving since 2013, and former deputy county executive of Wayne County

=== E-G ===
- David M. Ebel (J.D. 1965), judge of the United States Court of Appeals for the Tenth Circuit
- Aghogho Edevbie (J.D.), deputy Michigan secretary of state (2023–present)
- Harry T. Edwards (J.D. 1965), former chief judge of the United States Court of Appeals for the District of Columbia Circuit
- Larry Elder (J.D. 1977), syndicated radio and television talk show host
- Rossa Fanning (LL.M 2000), attorney general of Ireland (2022–present)
- John Feikens (J.D.), politician and judge from Michigan; senior judge, U.S. District Court for the Eastern District of Michigan (1986–present); was nominated to the same district court by three presidents
- Heidi Li Feldman (J.D. 1990), law professor
- Jeffrey L. Fisher (J.D. 1997), Stanford Law School professor; prevailing counsel in Crawford v. Washington and Blakely v. Washington
- Harold Ford Jr. (J.D. 1996), former U.S. representative from Tennessee; Democratic Leadership Council chair
- Ralph M. Freeman (LL.B. 1926), judge, United States District Court for the Eastern District of Michigan
- John J. Gardner (attended 1866–1867), U.S. representative from New Jersey; mayor of Atlantic City
- Ralph F. Gates (J.D. 1917), 37th governor of Indiana
- Richard Gephardt (J.D. 1965), U.S. representative from Missouri (1977–2005); House majority leader, 1989–1995; minority leader, 1995–2003
- Heather K. Gerken (J.D. 1994), 17th dean of Yale Law School
- Charles E. Gibson Jr. (LL.B. 1952), Vermont attorney general
- Ernest Willard Gibson (attended 1898–99), United States senator from Vermont
- Arthur L. Gilliom (LL.B. 1913), 25th Indiana attorney general (1925–1929)
- Paul Gillmor (J.D. 1964), U.S. representative from Ohio, 5th District; president of the Ohio Senate
- Jay Gorney (LL.B. 1919), Tin Pan Alley songwriter who co-wrote "Brother, Can You Spare a Dime?;" blacklisted during McCarthy era
- Ronald M. Gould (J.D. 1973), judge, United States Court of Appeals for the Ninth Circuit
- Jim Graham, D.C. city councilmember
- Chuck Greenberg (J.D. 1985), owner, CEO of the Texas Rangers
- Wycliffe Grousbeck (J.D. 1986), owner of the Boston Celtics

=== H-K ===
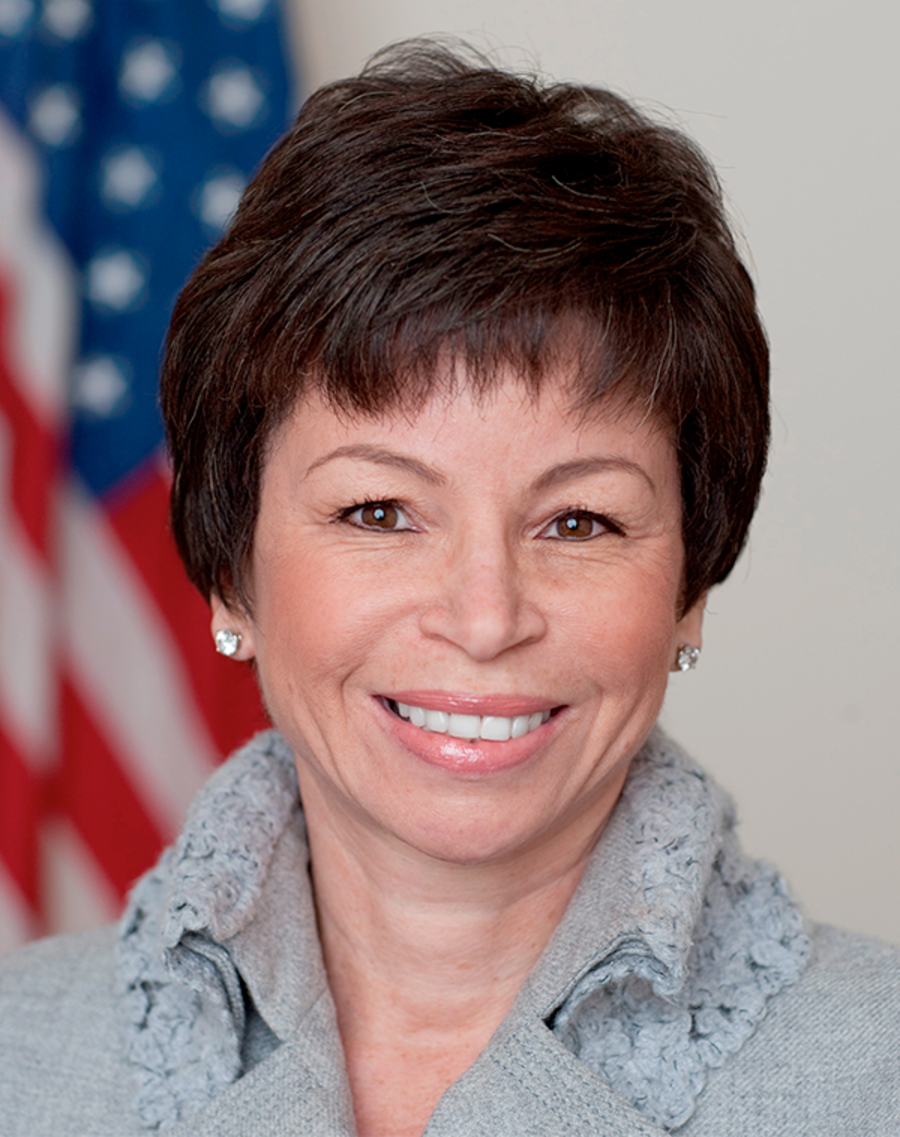
Valerie Jarrett

- Franklin D. Hale (LL.B. 1877), Vermont auditor of accounts, and longtime U.S. consul in several locations
- Seneca Haselton (LL.B. 1875), mayor of Burlington, Vermont, U.S. minister to Venezuela, associate justice of the Vermont Supreme Court
- Kirby Hendee (LL.B. 1953), Wisconsin state senator
- J. Lister Hill (attended), former U.S. senator from Alabama
- James P. Hoffa (LL.B. 1966), president, International Brotherhood of Teamsters
- James W. Houck (J.D. 1985), Judge Advocate General of the United States Navy
- Harland Bradley Howe (LL.B. 1894), United States District Court for the District of Vermont
- Wilbur E. Hurlbut (LL.B. 1893), Wisconsin state assemblyman
- Bela S. Huntington (attended 1882–83), member of the Oregon House of Representatives
- Sada Jacobson (J.D. 2011), Olympic fencing silver and bronze medalist
- Valerie Jarrett (J.D. 1981), senior advisor to President Obama
- Christopher M. Jeffries (J.D. 1974), real estate developer and namesake of Jeffries Hall
- Robert M. Johnson (J.D. 1971), former publisher of Newsday
- Matthew M. Joyce, United States federal judge
- Amalya Lyle Kearse (J.D. 1962), judge, United States Court of Appeals for the Second Circuit
- Paul S. Kemp (J.D. 2000), fantasy author, known for Forgotten Realms novels; defender of shared world fiction; his novel Deceived (2011) was on the New York Times best-seller list
- Cornelia Groefsema Kennedy (J.D. 1947), senior judge, United States Court of Appeals for the Sixth Circuit
- Raymond Kethledge (J.D. 1993), judge, United States Court of Appeals for the Sixth Circuit
- John Knauf (1892), justice of the North Dakota Supreme Court

=== L-Q ===
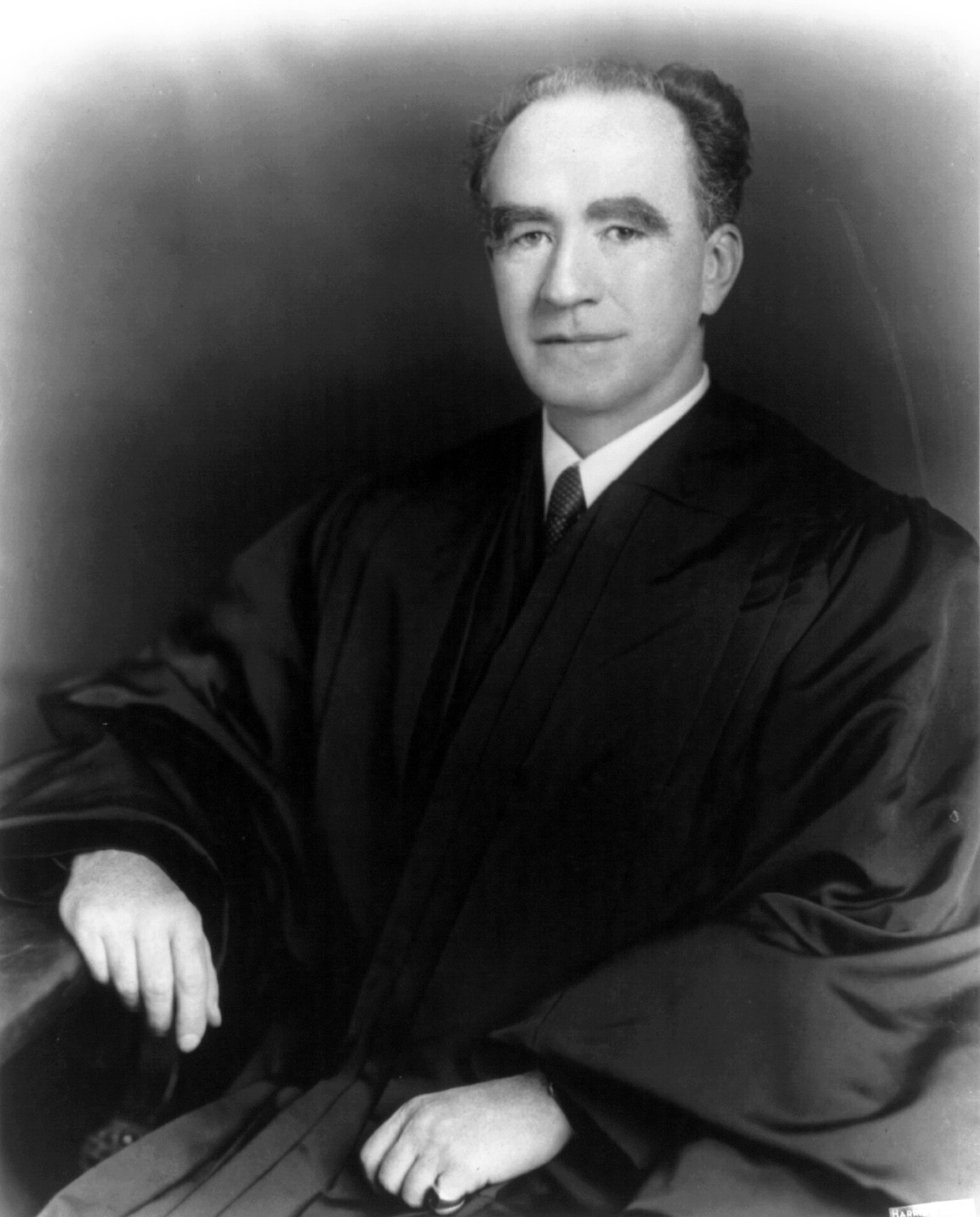
Frank Murphy

- Cary D. Landis (LL.B., 1899), 25th Florida attorney general (1931–1938)
- Eric Lefkofsky (J.D. 1993), serial entrepreneur; co-founder of and angel investor in Groupon; president of private equity and consulting firm Blue Media, LLC; named to Forbes' 2011 list of billionaires
- Jeffrey Lehman (J.D. 1981), 11th president of Cornell University
- Brian Leiter (J.D. 1987), professor, University of Chicago
- U. S. Lesh (LL.B., 1891), 24th Indiana attorney general (1921–1925)
- Jason Levien (J.D. 1997), co-owner of the Major League Soccer club D.C. United and Welsh club Swansea City A.F.C.
- Tom Lewand (J.D. 1996), president of the Detroit Lions
- E.W. Marland (LL.B., 1893), oilman; U.S. congressman; Oklahoma governor
- J. Thomas McCarthy (J.D. 1963), author of McCarthy's Treatise on Trademark and Unfair Competition
- Francis McNulty Jr. (LL.B. 1888), Republican member of the Iowa House of Representatives, 1896–1898
- Charles Edward Merrill (1906–1907), co-founded stock brokerage firm Merrill Lynch with Edmund C. Lynch; worked at Merrill Lynch, 1914–56
- Charles W. Miller (1884), 18th Indiana attorney general (1903–1907)
- Robert E. Minahan (LL.B. 1894), mayor of Green Bay, Wisconsin
- Jeffrey P. Minear (J.D. 1982), counselor to Chief Justice John G. Roberts Jr.
- Mayo Moran (LL.M. 1992), professor of Law, provost and vice-chancellor of Trinity College, Toronto
- Frank Murphy (LL.B. 1914), United States attorney general, 1939; United States Supreme Court associate justice, 1940–1949
- Gordon Myse (LL.B. 1960), judge of the Wisconsin Court of Appeals
- Harry Nelson, author
- Helen W. Nies (L.L.B. 1948), chief judge of the United States Court of Appeals for the Federal Circuit, 1990–1994
- Ronald L. Olson (J.D. 1967), attorney and name partner in the Los Angeles office of the law firm of Munger Tolles & Olson LLP
- Kevyn Orr (J.D. 1983), partner with Jones Day LLP and emergency financial manager of the city of Detroit, Michigan, 2013–2014
- Rob Pelinka (J.D. 1996), general manager of Los Angeles Lakers; former sports agent, known for representing Kobe Bryant
- Frank Plumley (attended 1867–68), United States congressman from Vermont
- Mark F. Pomerantz (J.D. 1975), New York attorney
- Lloyd Welch Pogue (J.D.), pioneering aviation attorney; chairman of the now-defunct Civil Aeronautics Board
- John Porter (J.D. 1961), United States representative from Illinois, 1980–2001
- Rob Portman (J.D. 1984), director of the Office of Management and Budget; United States senator from Ohio

=== R-Z ===
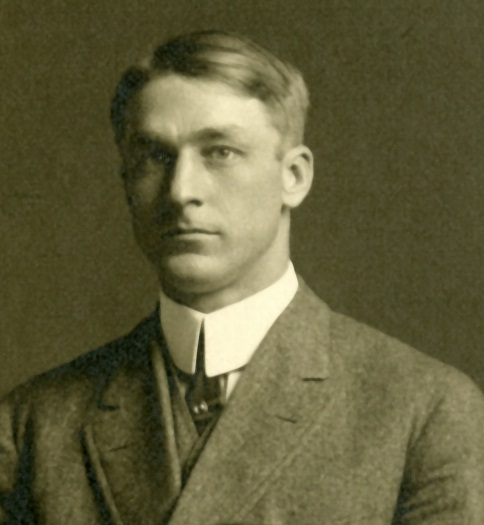
Branch Rickey

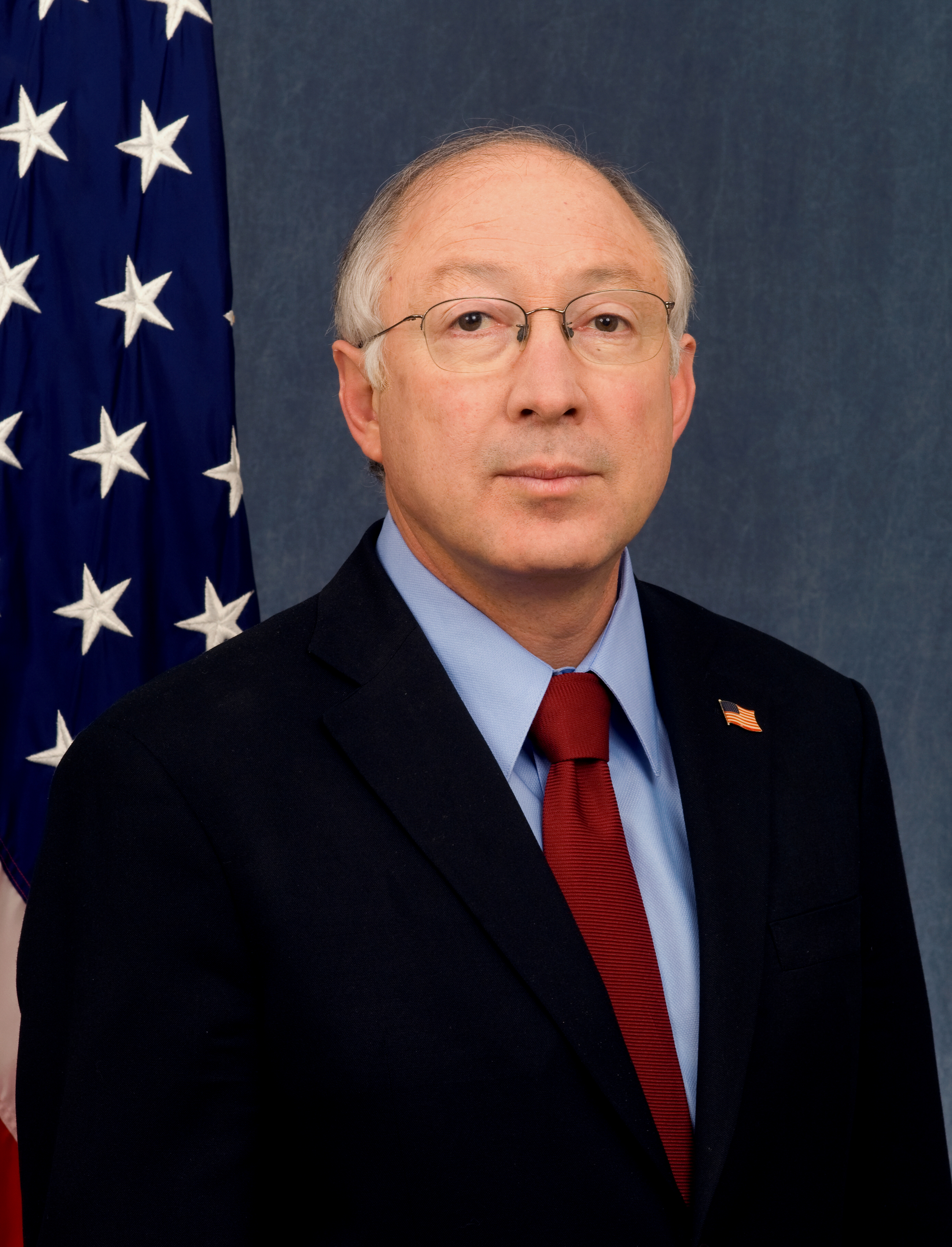
Ken Salazar

- Luis María Ramírez Boettner (J.D. 1944), minister of Foreign Affairs of Paraguay, 1993–1996
- Clark T Randt Jr. (J.D. 1975), United States ambassador to China (2001–2009)
- Nicholas Ranjan (J.D. 2003), district judge for the United States District Court for the Western District of Pennsylvania
- Branch Rickey (LL.B. 1911), Major League Baseball executive and Hall of Famer; created the modern minor league system and signed Jackie Robinson to a contract, breaking the sport's 20th-century color line
- Richard Riordan (J.D. 1956), mayor of Los Angeles, 1993–2001
- John M. Rogers (J.D. 1974), judge, United States Court of Appeals for the Sixth Circuit
- Marvin B. Rosenberry (J.D. 1893), chief justice of the Wisconsin Supreme Court
- Donald Stuart Russell, U.S. senator from South Carolina, 1965–1966; 107th governor of South Carolina, 1963–1965
- Ken Salazar (J.D. 1981), former U.S. senator from Colorado; former United States secretary of the interior
- Miriam Defensor Santiago (LL.M. 1975, S.J.D. 1976), member of the Senate of the Philippines; judge of the International Criminal Court
- Joseph Francis Sartori 1881, founder and president, Security First-National Bank, co-founder, president, Los Angeles Country Club
- Anthony Joseph Scirica (J.D. 1965), chief judge, United States Court of Appeals for the Third Circuit
- Robert E. Scott (S.J.D. 1973), bankruptcy scholar and professor at Columbia Law School
- Carol Sanger (J.D. 1976), reproductive rights expert, professor at Columbia Law School
- Theary Seng, Cambodian-American human-rights activist and lawyer
- Ma. Lourdes Aranal Sereno (LL.M. 1993), Filipino jurist, lawyer and law professor; former chief justice of the Supreme Court of the Philippines
- Myra C. Selby (J.D. 1977), first woman and first African-American justice on the Indiana Supreme Court
- Cynthia Leitich Smith (J.D. 1994), author
- Rick Snyder (J.D. 1982), former CEO of Gateway; former governor of Michigan
- George Alexander Spater (J.D. 1933), chairman of American Airlines, 1968–1973
- Oliver Lyman Spaulding (LL.B., 1896), U.S. Army brigadier general
- Robert Stafford, US congressman and senator; 71st governor of Vermont
- Bert Sugar (J.D. 1961), author of more than 80 books; editor and publisher of The Ring, a magazine devoted to boxing (his daughter Jennifer attended Michigan as an undergrad)
- George Sutherland (attended 1891), United States Supreme Court justice
- Kent D. Syverud (J.D. 1981), dean of the Washington University School of Law
- Masaaki Tanaka (LL.M), president and chief executive officer of UnionBanCal Corporation and its principal subsidiary, Union Bank of California
- Daniel Tarullo (J.D. 1977), member of board of governors of the United States Federal Reserve Board since 2009
- Hobart Taylor Jr., executive vice chairman of the President's Committee on Equal Employment Opportunities, Special Counsel to President Lyndon Johnson, director of the Export–Import Bank of the United States; first African-American editor of the Michigan Law Review
- Arn Tellem (J.D.), sports agent; former columnist for The New York Times
- Larry Dean Thompson (J.D.), lawyer; deputy attorney general of the United States under President George W. Bush until August 2003
- William Wheeler Thornton (LL.B. 1876), judge; author; Indiana deputy attorney feneral; Indiana State Supreme Court librarian
- Norman O. Tietjens (J.D. 1930), judge of the United States Tax Court
- John D. Voelker (JD 1928), justice of the Michigan Supreme Court; author of Anatomy of a Murder
- John M. Walker Jr. (J.D. 1966), former chief judge, United States Court of Appeals for the Second Circuit
- Moses Fleetwood Walker (attended 1881–1882), baseball player and author; first African-American to play major league professional baseball
- Johnnie Mac Walters, former commissioner of Internal Revenue
- Albert D. Walton (LL.B. 1907), former US attorney for the district of Wyoming
- James Franklin Ware, Wisconsin state assemblyman and senator
- Charles W. Waterman (LL.B. 1889), U.S. senator from Colorado
- Walter W. Wensinger (LL.B. 1917), highly decorated lieutenant general in the Marine Corps during World War II
- Sarah Killgore Wertman (LL.B. 1871), née Sarah Killgore, the first woman to be admitted to the bar of any US state
- David Westin (J.D. 1977), president of ABC News
- Mary Collins Whiting (1835–1912), lawyer, businesswoman, teacher
- James J. White (J.D. 1962), Robert A. Sullivan Professor of Law at Michigan Law; expert on the Uniform Commercial Code
- G. Mennen Williams (J.D. 1936), 41st governor of Michigan and assistant secretary of state for African Affairs under President John F. Kennedy
- Ralph Wilson, owner, Buffalo Bills
- Bob Woodruff (J.D. 1987), journalist; ABC News anchor
- Frank Wu, dean of University of California, Hastings College of the Law
- John C.H. Wu (J.D. 1928), principal author of the constitution of the Republic of China
- Sam Zell (LSA B.A. 1963; J.D. 1966), land developer; founder of EQ Office; former National Association of Real Estate Investment Trusts chairman; current chairman and majority owner of the Tribune Company

== See also ==
- University of Michigan Law School
