= Brian Leiter =

American philosopher and legal scholar (born 1963)

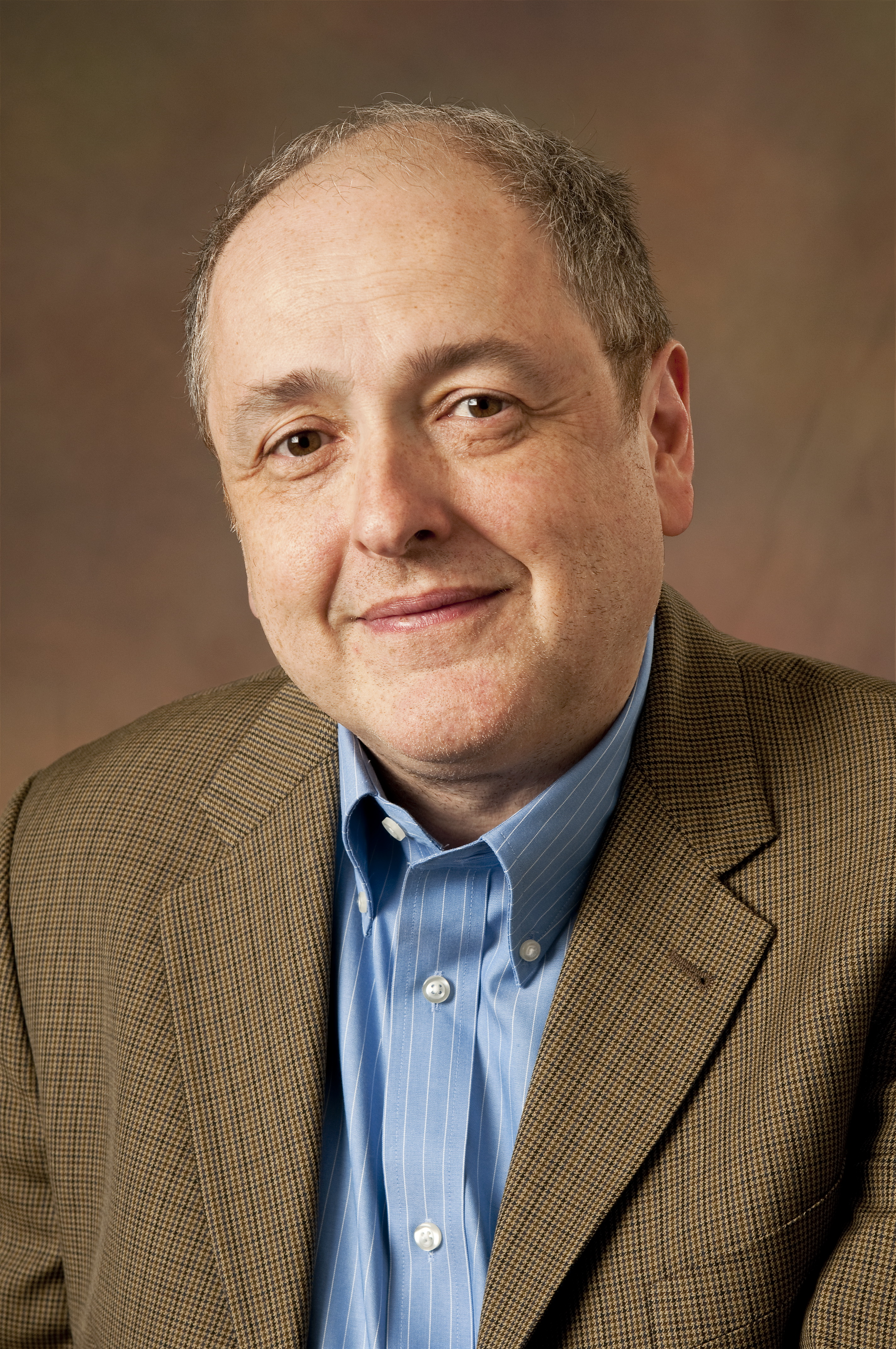
- Born: Brian Russell Leiter; 1963 (age 62–63); New York City, U.S.

Academic background
- Education: Princeton University (BA); University of Michigan (JD, PhD)
- Thesis: Nietzsche and the Critique of Morality: Philosophical Naturalism in Nietzsche's Theory of Value (1995)
- Doctoral advisor: Frithjof Bergmann, Peter Railton, Elizabeth S. Anderson, Don Herzog
- Other advisors: Raymond Geuss, Richard Rorty, Jerrold Seigel, Stephen Darwall
- Influences: Friedrich Nietzsche, Peter Railton, H. L. A. Hart

Academic work
- Era: Contemporary philosophy
- Region: Western philosophy
- School or tradition: Continental philosophy
- Institutions: University of Chicago Law School
- Main interests: Philosophy of law, Nietzsche, Continental philosophy
- Notable ideas: Naturalized jurisprudence

Brian Russell Leiter (/ˈlaɪtər/; born 1963) is an American philosopher and legal scholar who is Karl N. Llewellyn Professor of Jurisprudence in the Law School and affiliated faculty in the Department of Philosophy at the University of Chicago, as well as founder and Director of Chicago's Center for Law, Philosophy & Human Values. A review in Notre Dame Philosophical Reviews described Leiter as "one of the most influential legal philosophers of our time", while a review in The Journal of Nietzsche Studies described Leiter's book Nietzsche on Morality (2002) as "arguably the most important book on Nietzsche's philosophy in the past twenty years."

Leiter taught from 1995 to 2008 at the University of Texas School of Law, where he was the founder and director of the Law and Philosophy Program. He joined the University of Chicago faculty in 2008. His scholarly writings have been primarily in legal philosophy and Continental philosophy, especially Nietzsche and Marx. He has also been a visiting professor at universities in the United States and Europe, including Yale University and Oxford University. He is founding editor of a book series entitled Routledge Philosophers, and (with Leslie Green) of Oxford Studies in Philosophy of Law.

Leiter was also the founder and for 25 years the editor of the Philosophical Gourmet Report ("PGR"), an influential but controversial ranking of philosophy PhD programs in the English-speaking world. After repeated protests, one in 2002 and one in 2014, Leiter retired and turned over editorship of the PGR to Berit Brogaard, a philosopher at the University of Miami, and Christopher Pynes, a philosopher at Western Illinois University.

== Education and career ==
Born to a Jewish family in Manhattan, Leiter earned his Bachelor of Arts in philosophy from Princeton University (1984), and his J.D. (1987) and Ph.D. (in philosophy; 1995) from the University of Michigan, where his dissertation was supervised by Peter Railton.

Leiter taught for two years at the University of San Diego School of Law, and was a visiting assistant professor of philosophy at the University of California, San Diego, before joining the faculty at the University of Texas School of Law in 1995, where he taught until 2008. At Texas, Leiter was the founder and Director of the Law and Philosophy Program. In 2008, Leiter moved to the University of Chicago, where he became Karl N. Llewellyn Professor of Jurisprudence at the University of Chicago Law School, and founder of Chicago's Center for Law, Philosophy & Human Values.

Leiter has been a visiting professor of law or philosophy at Yale Law School, University College London, University of Chicago Law School, University of Paris X-Nanterre, University of California, San Diego, and Oxford University. He edited the journal Legal Theory from 2000 to 2008, and is editor of the Routledge Philosophers, a series of introductions to major philosophers, and (with Leslie Green) of Oxford Studies in the Philosophy of Law.

== Philosophical work ==
Leiter's scholarly writings have been in two main areas—legal philosophy and Continental philosophy—although he has also written about metaethics, religious liberty, and other topics. Philosophical naturalism has been a major theme in many of these contexts.

=== Legal philosophy ===
In legal philosophy, Leiter has offered a reinterpretation of American Legal Realism as embodying a prescient philosophical naturalism and a defense of what he called "naturalized jurisprudence" in his book Naturalizing Jurisprudence: Essays on American Legal Realism and Naturalism in Legal Philosophy (Oxford University Press, 2007). Upon publication, Jeremy Horder wrote that the "book will confirm Brian Leiter's place in the front rank of legal theorists in the world today." Leiter also wrote the entry on "Naturalism in Legal Philosophy" for the Stanford Encyclopedia of Philosophy. On his view, "philosophers generally should aim to unpack the 'concepts that have been vindicated by their role in successful explanation and prediction of empirical phenomena'" and thus should "'take seriously the…social scientific literature on law…to see what concept of law figures in the most powerful explanatory and predictive models of legal phenomena such as judicial behavior.' This methodological view, however, raises questions about why the legal philosopher should study only judicial behavior and not something else. More generally, the naturalist owes an account of what features of law are most in need of explication and why."

=== Continental philosophy ===
Leiter is also a scholar of Continental philosophy, and is co-editor with Michael E. Rosen of The Oxford Handbook of Continental Philosophy. He has written a considerable amount on the philosophical work of Friedrich Nietzsche, including an article for the Stanford Encyclopedia of Philosophy. In particular, Leiter defended a reading of Nietzsche as a philosophical naturalist in his Nietzsche on Morality (London: Routledge, 2002) and in later papers, including one with Joshua Knobe on "The Case for Nietzschean Moral Psychology" in Nietzsche and Morality (Oxford University Press, 2007).

In 2014, when student members of the University College London Union Council informed the "Nietzsche Club" that it could no longer declare an affiliation with the school because the club was promoting "far-right" and "fascist" ideologies, Leiter first defended the club, saying Nietzsche was not a fascist, but later noted that if the club is a front for a fascist group, then it's a shame that Nietzsche was smeared as a fascist in the discussion.

=== Other work ===
Leiter's book, Why Tolerate Religion?, published by Princeton University Press, has proved controversial. The political philosopher John Gray wrote, "A model of clarity and rigour and at points strikingly original, this is a book that anyone who thinks seriously about religion, ethics, and politics will benefit from reading." Christopher L. Eisgruber, the President of Princeton University, said. "Every reader will learn something from this remarkable book, and, beginning now, every serious scholar of religious toleration will have to contend with Leiter's bold claims." By contrast, the website of the conservative Family Research Council said the book was "one of the most troubling and intellectually discreditable books by a serious American scholar in some time." The book was named an "Outstanding Academic Title" by Choice in 2013.

Leiter has also published work on meta-ethics, social epistemology, the law of evidence, and on philosophers Karl Marx, Martin Heidegger, and Ronald Dworkin.

== Philosophical Gourmet Report and other academic rankings ==
In 1989, while he was a graduate student Leiter made a list of what he believed to be the top 25 graduate philosophy programs in the United States. Called the Philosophical Gourmet Report, this list came to be known as "the Leiter Report" and has been internationally recognized. It is now published by Wiley-Blackwell, it is the foremost ranking of graduate programs in philosophy in the English-speaking world.

The PGR was described by David L. Kirp in a 2003 New York Times op-ed as "the bible for prospective [philosophy] graduate students." George Yancy, in Reframing the Practice of Philosophy: Bodies of Color, Bodies of Knowledge (SUNY Press, 2012), opined that Philosophical Gourmet Report ranking: "is, of course, very controversial. However, as is often pointed out, there is no real alternative." Carlin Romano, in America the Philosophical (Knopf Doubleday Publishing Group, 2013), referred to the PGR rankings as "often-criticized" and "biased towards mainstream analytic departments" although it covers Continental philosophy as well.

In 2002, nearly 300 philosophers signed an open letter calling on Leiter to stop producing the PGR. In fall 2014, over 600 philosophers signed a petition to boycott the PGR organized by some philosophers at University of British Columbia to protest what they called a "derogatory and intimidating" e-mail sent by Leiter to one of their colleagues. A majority of the Advisory Board of the PGR (30 of the 54 members) thought it best that he relinquish control over the Report's management.

In response, Leiter appointed a co-editor for the 2014 report Berit Brogaard, a philosophy professor at the University of Miami, and agreed to step down as editor after its publication. Leiter dismissed the criticisms, claiming the criticisms came from people whose organizations had received a poor ranking, or from feminists he characterized as upset with his stance in favor of due process for men accused of sexual harassment. He subsequently retained a lawyer to sue the organizers of the 2014 protest for defamation.

The Australian reported that

Professor Leiter ... said there had never been any impropriety in his administration of the report but "if someone feels editing the PGR means forfeiting certain expressive rights, then I accept that they have a reason not to participate while I remain as one of the editors. And since I value my expressive rights (including my right to express myself in ways some others may find offensive), that gives me an additional reason to dissociate from the PGR so that those philosophers will, I hope, participate in the future."

Leiter has also edited a ranking of U.S. law schools, which The Washington Post describes as "well-known", and was hired by Maclean's magazine in Canada to produce a ranking of Canadian law schools.

== Blogging and other public activities ==
Leiter is a blogger, running three blogs, one on philosophy (and political commentary), one on law, and one on Nietzsche. Leiter's philosophy blog includes both professional news and polemics, for example, critiques of proponents of intelligent design and of the 2003 invasion of Iraq. He has also written critiques of journalists and philosophers, including Carlin Romano, Thomas Nagel, Leon Wieseltier, and Paul Campos. He is known for his "combative tactics on his blogs and social media."

Leiter has spoken in support of academic freedom. He defended Steven Salaita, both online and on television, and Rebecca Tuvel, the philosopher criticized during the Hypatia transracialism controversy. He also wrote in The New York Times in defense of John Yoo against calls for Berkeley to investigate him, concluding, "John Yoo has earned international moral opprobrium for his views. That has no bearing on his job, or his right to it, at Berkeley".

Cato Institute senior fellow Walter K. Olson described Leiter as "left-leaning" in his book Schools for Misrule: Legal Academia and an Overlawyered America (Encounter Books, 2011),

== Books ==
- Objectivity in Law and Morals (editor) (Cambridge University Press, 2001)
- Nietzsche on Morality (Routledge, 2002; 2nd ed., 2014)
- The Future for Philosophy (editor) (Oxford University Press, 2004)
- Naturalizing Jurisprudence: Essays on American Legal Realism and Naturalism in Legal Philosophy (Oxford University Press, 2007)
- Nietzsche and Morality (co-edited with Sinhababu) (Oxford University Press, 2007)
- The Oxford Handbook of Continental Philosophy (co-edited with Rosen) (Oxford University Press, 2007)
- Why Tolerate Religion? (Princeton University Press, 2013)
- Moral Psychology with Nietzsche (Oxford University Press, 2019)
- Marx (Routledge Philosophers, 2025) (with Jaime Edwards)
- From a Realist Point of View. (Oxford University Press, forthcoming 2026).

== Other publications ==
- "Free Speech on the Internet: The Crisis of Epistemic Authority" (Daedalus, 2024)

== See also ==
- List of American philosophers
