= Philosophical Gourmet Report =

Survey-based ranking of philosophy departments

The Philosophical Gourmet Report, also known as the Leiter Report or PGR, is a ranking of graduate programs in philosophy in the English-speaking world. It was founded by philosophy and law professor Brian Leiter and is now edited by philosophy professors Berit Brogaard and Christopher Pynes.

== History ==
=== 20th century ===
The Gourmet Report ranking was created in response to the Gourman Report, and is based on a survey of philosophers who are nominated as evaluators by the report's advisory board. Its purpose is to provide guidance to prospective PhD students, particularly those students who intend to pursue a professional career in academic philosophy. The report first appeared on the web in 1996; it is currently published and distributed by Blackwell.

In 1989, while he was a graduate student, Leiter made a subjective list of what he believed to be the top 25 graduate philosophy programs in the United States, which came to be the PGR.

=== 21st century ===
PGR was described by David L. Kirp in a 2003 New York Times op-ed as "the bible for prospective [philosophy] graduate students." Carlin Romano, in America the Philosophical (Knopf Doubleday Publishing Group, 2013), referred to the PGR rankings as "often-criticized" and "biased towards mainstream analytic departments".

In 2002, 175 philosophers signed an open letter calling on Leiter to stop producing the PGR. In fall 2014, over 600 philosophers signed a petition to boycott the PGR. The petition was organized by some philosophers at the University of British Columbia to protest what they called a "derogatory and intimidating" e-mail sent by Leiter to one of their colleagues. Leiter claimed the recipient had threatened him. Twenty-four of the 56 members of the advisory board of the PGR recommended he relinquish control over the report's management. In response, Leiter appointed Berit Brogaard, a philosophy professor at the University of Miami, as co-editor for the 2014 report and agreed to step down as editor of subsequent editions. Leiter subsequently appointed Christopher Pynes of Western Illinois University as co-editor of future editions.

== 2021-22 global rankings (Top 25) ==
Rank (2021–22)	School	Country
1	New York University	New York City, U.S.
2	Oxford University	Oxford, UK
3	Rutgers University	New Brunswick, New Jersey, U.S.
4	Princeton University	Princeton, New Jersey, U.S.
5	University of Pittsburgh	Pittsburgh, Pennsylvania, U.S.
6	University of Michigan	Ann Arbor, Michigan, U.S.
6	Yale University	New Haven, Connecticut, U.S.
8	University of Toronto	Toronto, Ontario, Canada
9	Harvard University	Cambridge, Massachusetts, U.S.
9	MIT	Cambridge, Massachusetts, U.S.
9	University of California, Berkeley	Berkeley, California, U.S.
9	UCLA	Los Angeles, California, U.S.
9	USC	Los Angeles, California, U.S.
14	Graduate Center, CUNY	New York City, U.S.
14	Columbia University	New York City, U.S.
14	Stanford University	Stanford, California, U.S.
14	University of North Carolina, Chapel Hill	Chapel Hill, North Carolina, U.S.
14	University of Notre Dame	South Bend, Indiana, U.S.
19	University of Texas, Austin	Austin, Texas, U.S.
20	Brown University	Providence, Rhode Island, U.S.
20	University of Cambridge	Cambridge, UK
22	Cornell University	Ithaca, New York, U.S.
22	University of California, San Diego	San Diego, California, U.S.
22	University of Chicago	Chicago, Illinois, U.S.
25	Australian National University	Canberra, Australia
25	University of Arizona	Tucson, Arizona, U.S.
25	University of Wisconsin, Madison	Madison, Wisconsin, U.S.

== See also ==
- College and university rankings
