= Annette Baier =

New Zealand philosopher

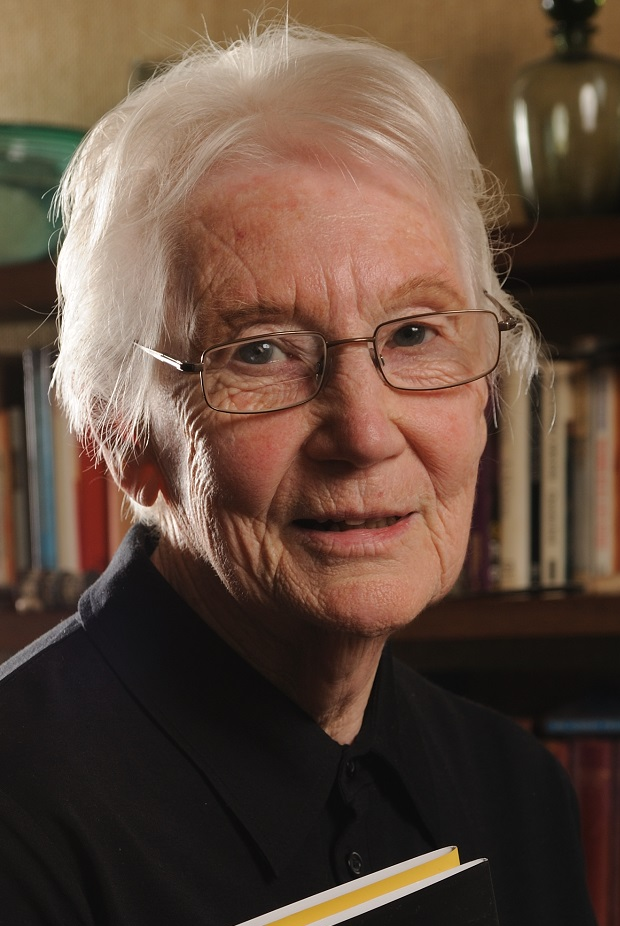
- Baier in 2008
- Born: Annette Claire Stoop; 11 October 1929; New Zealand
- Died: 2 November 2012 (aged 82); Dunedin, New Zealand

Education
- Education: University of Otago; Somerville College, Oxford

Philosophical work
- Era: Contemporary philosophy
- Region: Western philosophy
- School: Analytic philosophy
- Main interests: Ethics, feminist philosophy, philosophy of mind
- Notable ideas: The ethical significance of trust

Annette Claire Baier (née Stoop; 11 October 1929 – 2 November 2012) was a New Zealand philosopher and Hume scholar, focused in particular on Hume's moral psychology. She was well known also for her contributions to feminist philosophy and to the philosophy of mind, where she was strongly influenced by her former colleague, Wilfrid Sellars.

== Biography ==
Baier earned bachelor's and master's degrees at the University of Otago in her native Dunedin, New Zealand. In 1952 she went to Somerville College, Oxford, where she earned her PhD and met fellow philosophers Philippa Foot and G. E. M. Anscombe. For most of her career she taught in the philosophy department at the University of Pittsburgh, having moved there from Carnegie Mellon University. She retired to Dunedin.

She was former President of the Eastern Division of the American Philosophical Association, an office reserved for the elite of her profession. Baier received an honorary Doctor of Literature from the University of Otago in 1999.

Her husband was the philosopher Kurt Baier.

== Ethics ==
Baier's approach to ethics is that women and men make their decisions about right and wrong based on different value systems: men take their moral decisions according to an idea of justice, while women are motivated by a sense of trust or caring. The history of philosophy having been overwhelmingly compiled by men, she suggests, leads to a body of thought which apparently ignores the role of nurture and trust in human philosophy.

== Bibliography ==
=== Books ===
- Baier, Annette (1985). Postures of the Mind: Essays on Mind and Morals.
- Baier, Annette (1991). A Progress of Sentiments: Reflections on Hume's Treatise.
- Baier, Annette (1995). Moral Prejudices. Harvard University Press. ISBN 9780674587151., including especially "What Do Women Want in an Ethical Theory?" and "The Need For More Than Justice".
- Baier, Annette (1997). The Commons of the Mind. Paul Carus lectures.
- Baier, Annette (2008). Death and Character: Further Reflections on Hume. Harvard University Press.
- Baier, Annette (2009). Reflections on How We Live. Oxford University Press.
- Baier, Annette (2011). The Pursuits of Philosophy: An Introduction to the Life and Thought of David Hume. Harvard University Press.

=== Chapters in books ===
- Baier, Annette (1983), "Knowing Our Place in the Animal World", in Miller, Harlan B.; Williams, William H. (eds.), Ethics and Animals, Clifton, New Jersey: Humana Press, pp. 61–77, ISBN 978-0-89603-053-4.
- Baier, Annette (2005), "The Need for More Than Justice", in Cudd, Ann E.; Andreasen, Robin O. (eds.), Feminist theory: a philosophical anthology, Oxford, UK Malden, Massachusetts: Blackwell Publishing, pp. 243–250, ISBN 9781405116619.
