= Henry Nelson =

Henry Nelson may refer to:

- Henry Nelson, 2nd Baron Nelson of Stafford (1917–1995)
- Henry Nelson, 7th Earl Nelson (1894–1972), British peer
- Henry C. Nelson (1836–?), American lawyer and politician
- Henry Clay Nelson (1835–1893), surgeon in the United States Navy
- Henry Addison Nelson (1820–1906), American clergyman

== See also ==
- Harry Nelson (disambiguation)
