= Harry Nelson =

Harry Nelson may refer to:

- Harry Nelson (singer) (1804–?), singer and comedian
- Harry Nelson (author), American author and healthcare lawyer
- Harry Jakamarra Nelson (c. 1946–2021), Aboriginal rights campaigner, on the committee of the Aboriginal Publications Foundation in the 1970s
- Harry L. Nelson (1932–2024), American mathematician
- Harry Nelson, Canadian participant in the Athletics at the 1954 British Empire and Commonwealth Games
- DCI Harry Nelson, a major fictitious character in Elly Griffiths' Ruth Galloway novels

== See also ==
- Harold Nelson (disambiguation)
- Henry Nelson (disambiguation)
- Harry Nilsson (footballer) (1916–1993), Swedish footballer
- Harry Nilsson (1941–1994), American singer-songwriter
