= Harold Nelson =

Harold Nelson may refer to:

- Harold George Nelson (1881–1947), Australian politician
- Harold Nelson (athlete) (1923–2011), New Zealand long-distance runner
- Harold "H" Nelson (1928–2016), English cycling coach
- Harold E. H. Nelson (1871–1948), British book illustrator, artist and designer of bookplates
- Harold G. Nelson (born 1943), American architect, consultant and systems scientist
- Harold S. Nelson (1890-1972), American lawyer and politician

== See also ==
- Harry Nelson (disambiguation)
