= Kurt Baier =

Austrian moral philosopher (1917–2010)

- Born: 26 January 1917; Vienna, Austria-Hungary
- Died: 7 November 2010 (aged 93); Dunedin, New Zealand

Education
- Education: University of Vienna; University of Melbourne (BA, MA); University of Oxford (DPhil)
- Doctoral advisor: Stephen Toulmin

Philosophical work
- Era: Contemporary philosophy
- Region: Western philosophy
- School: Analytic
- Institutions: University of Melbourne; Australian National University; University of Pittsburgh
- Doctoral students: Stephen Darwall
- Main interests: Moral philosophy
- Notable ideas: Rational justification of morality

Kurt Baier (German: [ˈbaɪ̯ɐ]; 26 January 1917 – 7 November 2010) was an Austrian moral philosopher who taught for most of his career in Australia and the United States.

== Life and career ==
Born in Vienna, Baier studied law at the University of Vienna. In 1938, after the Anschluss he had to abandon his studies, and went to the United Kingdom as a refugee, where he was interned as a "friendly enemy alien" and sent to Australia on the Dunera. There he began studying philosophy. Baier received his B.A. from the University of Melbourne in 1944, and his M.A. in 1947. In 1952, he received his D.Phil. at Oxford University.

Baier taught at the University of Melbourne and the Australian National University. He met and married Annette Baier in 1958. He joined the faculty of the University of Pittsburgh in 1961, and became Chair of the Department in 1967, and remained at Pitt until his retirement in 1996. He became president of the Eastern Division and chair of the National Board of Officers of the American Philosophical Association, Both Baiers gave the Paul Carus lectures. He was elected a Fellow of the American Academy of Arts and Sciences in 1974. In 2001, Kurt was awarded an Honorary Doctorate of Jurisprudence from the Karl Franzen University of Graz. He was also honored by the Humanist Society.

Baier died at his home in Dunedin, New Zealand.

== Philosophical work ==
Beginning with his first and best known book, The Moral Point of View (1958), Baier has been attempting to construct a justification of morality that is grounded in rationality. His original strategy was to find certain nonquestion-begging requirements of practical reason that then could be shown to favor morality over egoism. According to Baier, the very raison d'être of a morality is to yield reasons that overrule the reasons of self-interest in those cases when everyone following their own self-interest would be harmful to everyone. If we appeal to self-interested reasons to be moral, it would seem that such reasons cannot support morality over self-interest in cases of conflict. On the other hand, if we appeal to non-self-interested reasons to justify morality, those reasons seem to be implicitly moral, and so this would just be begging the question against egoistic opponents of morality. While making many contributions to the conceptual analysis of basic concepts in moral, political and legal philosophy such as those of obligation, responsibility, reason for action, egoism and the meaning of life, and also to applied ethics, Baier struggled with the fundamental question of how to justify morality throughout his career. He inspired many other philosophers to do so as well.

In The Rational and the Moral Order (1995), Baier attempted to answer the question by interpreting morality as a system of reasons of mutual benefit that are appropriate for contexts in which everyone's following self-interested reasons would have suboptimal results for everyone. So interpreted, moral reasons apply only when there exists an adequate enforcement system that makes acting against those reasons unprofitable. Morality so construed never requires any degree of altruism or self-sacrifice; it only requires that people act upon reasons of mutual benefit. Given this interpretation of morality, it is not possible for the egoist to do better by acting against morality. So construed, morality and egoism do not really conflict. This solution to the problem of the justification of morality bears some resemblance to the one offered by David Gauthier in Morals By Agreement (1986), a philosopher who was also inspired by Baier’s work and who later joined Baier as a colleague at the University of Pittsburgh in 1980.

== Selected books ==
- The Moral Point of View (1958)
- The Rational and the Moral Order: The Social Roots of Reason and Morality (1995)
- Reason, Ethics and Society: Themes from Kurt Baier with his Responses, edited by J.B. Schneewind (1995)
- Problems of Life and Death (1997)
