= Jacob Loewenberg =

American philosopher

Jacob Loewenberg (February 2, 1882 – March 27, 1969) was a Latvian-American philosopher.

== Life and career ==
Loewenberg was born in Tukums, Russian Empire (present-day Latvia) into a Jewish family and moved to Riga at age 13. Fearing conscription by the Russian Army, he made his way to Boston in 1904 by way of Germany and England. Loewenberg was accepted into Harvard College upon arrival and began studying philosophy, earning a bachelor's degree in 1908, a master's degree in 1909, and a doctorate in 1911 (with a thesis under the title The Genesis of Hegel's Dialectical Method). At Harvard, he was influenced by Josiah Royce and George Santayana. He taught German and Philosophy at Wellesley College before taking an appointment in the philosophy department at University of California, Berkeley in 1915. He became a full professor in 1925 and served as department chair from 1935 to 1941. In 1950, he refused to sign a loyalty oath demanded by the University of California Board of Regents and was severed from the University. The California Supreme Court restored his position, and he retired as Professor Emeritus in 1952. In 1962, Loewenberg was awarded a Doctor of Laws degree by the University.

== Selected works ==
- "Problematic Realism" in Contemporary American Philosophy (1930)
- Dialogues from Delphi (1949)
- Carus Lectures: "Reason and the Nature of Things" (1959)
- Hegel's Phenomenology: Dialogues on the Life of the Mind (1965)
- Thrice-born: Selected Memories of an American Immigrant (1968)
