= Claudia Card =

American philosopher

- Born: Claudia Falconer Card; September 30, 1940; Pardeeville, Wisconsin, U.S.
- Died: September 12, 2015 (aged 74); Fitchburg, Wisconsin, U.S.

Education
- Education: Harvard University
- Doctoral advisor: John Rawls

Philosophical work
- Era: Contemporary philosophy
- Region: Western philosophy
- School: Analytic philosophy
- Institutions: University of Wisconsin–Madison
- Main interests: Ethics, social philosophy
- Notable ideas: Atrocity paradigm, genocide as social death, structural evil

Claudia Falconer Card (September 30, 1940 – September 12, 2015) was an American philosopher who was the Emma Goldman (WARF) Professor of Philosophy at the University of Wisconsin–Madison, with teaching affiliations in Women's Studies, Jewish Studies, Environmental Studies, and LGBT Studies.

== Education ==
She earned her B.A. from the University of Wisconsin–Madison (1962) and her M.A. (1964) and Ph.D. (1969) from Harvard University, where she wrote her dissertation under the direction of John Rawls. At the University of Wisconsin, she was mentored by Marcus George Singer, who picked her out as an undergraduate to be his T.A. MGS encouraged her to pursue a PhD at Harvard, and fought for her tenure at UW Madison. (source, MG Singer & C. Card conversations and writings.)

== Career ==
Card joined the faculty in the philosophy department at Wisconsin straight from her Harvard studies. She held visiting professorships at The Goethe Institute (Frankfurt), Dartmouth College (Hanover, New Hampshire), and the University of Pittsburgh. She wrote four treatises, edited or co-edited six books, and published nearly 150 articles and reviews. She delivered nearly 250 papers at conferences, colleges, and universities and was featured in 29 radio broadcasts. She delivered the John Dewey Lecture to the Central Division of the American Philosophical Association (APA) in 2008. In April 2011 Card became the President of the APA's Central Division. Her Presidential Address was "Surviving Long-Term Mass Atrocities: U-Boats, Catchers, and Ravens". In 2013, she was invited to deliver the Paul Carus Lectures, a series of three lectures delivered to the APA; these were to be delivered at the Central Division in 2016.

In 2011, Card was awarded the University of Wisconsin's Hilldale Award for excellence in teaching, research and service. In nominating her for this award, her department chair, Russ Shafer-Landau, said, "Her books and articles have become as essential to feminist thinking as Das Kapital is to labor theory. You simply can't do feminism without reading Card, and even if you don't read Card, today's feminism bears her mark so deeply that you may not even realize that you have in some other way digested her theoretical perspectives."

== Research ==
Card's research primarily focused on ethics and social philosophy, including normative ethical theory; feminist ethics; environmental ethics; and theories of justice, punishment, and evil. She paid special attention to the ethical theories of Kant, Schopenhauer, and Nietzsche, and had read widely in history, sociology, and survivor testimony. In the 1970s, Card was an active early member of the Midwest Society for Women in Philosophy, and was a pioneer in articulating lesbian feminist philosophy. She supported a variety of LGBT research and activism throughout her career. In 1996, the Society for Women in Philosophy (SWIP) elected her Distinguished Philosopher of the Year. Card had previously taken some controversial stances, such as arguing against marriage, on the grounds that it gives each party rights over the person of the other that no one should have, and as being especially dangerous to women within patriarchy. While others were painting rosy pictures of equality in lesbian relationships, Card's realism came through in her articulation of the dangers of lesbian battering. Standing up for the oppressed and for persons at risk had marked her work from the start, in her classic and still oft-cited "On Mercy." Later on in her career, her work turned to understanding the nature of evil. She tackled issues of racism, sexism, oppression, developed a theory of genocide as social death, developed theories of militarism, punishment, and as early as 1996 urged that rape be seen as a weapon of war.

Prior to her death, Card's work developed a secular conception of evil, which appeared in two volumes of an intended trilogy, The Atrocity Paradigm: A Theory of Evil. An issue of Hypatia was dedicated to the book. These two volumes brought together 20 philosophers commenting on Card's work.

The second book in the trilogy is Confronting Evils: Terrorism, Torture, Genocide. In it, Card examined her account of atrocity as a paradigm of evil, refining and expanding the views developed in the first book, with attention to structural evil, the role of harm, and the significance of culpability. She argued that evils are inexcusably wrong and that they need not be extraordinary. She also indicated we must pay attention to evils that occur so commonly that we tend to overlook them. She applied, tested, and extended this revised account in examining the moral wrongs of terrorism, torture, and genocide. While she was writing this second book in the trilogy, Card also co-edited a collection of philosophical papers on Genocide's Aftermath.

Prior to her death on September 12, 2015, Card worked extensively on the third book in the trilogy, on Surviving Atrocity. This book built upon her 2010 APA presidential address, and maintained a focus on mass atrocities. The book also included attention to surviving long-term mass atrocities, poverty, and global and local misogyny.

Card introduced the concept of "social death", originally developed by Orlando Patterson, into the field of genocide studies. Her approach related the harm of genocidal violence to the destruction of a group's “social vitality”. Social vitality refers to a group's social connections and relationships; which provide meaning to individual life. Social death occurs when the social vitality of the group is eroded and damaged. This connects the violence done to the individual to the harm experienced by the collective. Her approach allows for actions advancing genocide to include various means of both fatal and non-fatal harm; including murder, as well as the destruction of cultural heritage or mass sexual violence. Card proposed that the final aim of genocide was to enact social death on a group, which does not always necessarily include the mass murder of its members.

== Illness and death ==
Card was diagnosed with lung cancer in summer 2014, underwent treatment, and seemed to be doing well. However, in early 2015, while attending the Ohio Philosophical Association annual meeting, where she was the invited keynote speaker, at Baldwin Wallace University outside of Cleveland, Ohio, Card collapsed in her hotel room. She was treated at the Cleveland Clinic, where she learned that her cancer had metastasized. After radiation treatment, months of rehabilitation and therapy, Card died, surrounded by her family, on September 12, 2015, at the age of 74, 18 days before her 75th birthday.

== Selected bibliography ==
=== Books ===
- Card, Claudia (1991). Feminist ethics. Lawrence, Kansas: University Press of Kansas. ISBN 9780700604838.
- Card, Claudia (1995). Lesbian choices. New York: Columbia University Press. ISBN 9780231080095.
- Card, Claudia (1996). The unnatural lottery: character and moral luck. Philadelphia, Pennsylvania: Temple University Press. ISBN 9781566394536.
- Trilogy:

Card, Claudia (2002). The Atrocity Paradigm: a theory of evil. New York: Oxford University Press. ISBN 9780195181265.
Card, Claudia (2010). Confronting evils: terrorism, torture, genocide. Cambridge, England: Cambridge University Press. ISBN 9780521899611.
Card, Claudia. Surviving atrocity. (forthcoming)

=== Chapters in books ===
- Card, Claudia (2004), "Torture in ordinary circumstances", in DesAutels, Peggy; Walker, Margaret Urban (eds.), Moral psychology: feminist ethics and social theory, Feminist Constructions, Lanham, Maryland: Rowman & Littlefield Publishers, pp. 141–162, ISBN 9780742534803.
