= Don Herzog =

American philosopher

- Born: April 7, 1956 (age 70)
- Awards: Golden Apple Award

Education
- Education: Cornell University (BA); Harvard University (PhD)

Philosophical work
- Era: 21st-century philosophy
- Region: Western philosophy
- Institutions: University of Michigan
- Main interests: consent theory, sovereignty, constitutional interpretation, torts, the First Amendment

Don Herzog (born April 7, 1956) is an American political scientist and Edson R. Sunderland Professor of Law at the University of Michigan. He is known for his works on consent theory and sovereignty and is a winner of the Golden Apple Award for excellence in teaching at that university.

== Books ==
- Sovereignty, RIP, Yale University Press 2020
- A Little Book of Political Mistakes, 2020
- Defaming the Dead, Yale University Press 2017
- Poisoning the Minds of the Lower Orders, Princeton University Press 1998
- Happy Slaves: A Critique of Consent Theory, University of Chicago Press 1989
