= American Philosophical Association =

Body encompassing professional philosophers in USA

- Established: 1900
- Location: Newark, Delaware
- President: Christia Mercer (Eastern); Julia Driver (Central); Penelope Maddy (Pacific)
- First President: Mary Whiton Calkins
- Affiliations: American Council of Learned Societies, National Humanities Alliance
- Website: www.apaonline.org

The American Philosophical Association (APA) is the main professional organization for philosophers in the United States. Founded in 1900, its mission is to promote the exchange of ideas among philosophers, to encourage creative and scholarly activity in philosophy, to facilitate the professional work and teaching of philosophers, and to represent philosophy as a discipline. The APA's governance has included Robert Audi, Jaegwon Kim and Ruth Barcan Marcus.

== Activities ==
The association has three divisions: Pacific, Central, and Eastern. Each division organizes a large annual conference. The biggest of these is the Eastern Division Meeting, which usually attracts around 2,000 philosophers and takes place in a different East Coast city each December. The Eastern Division Meeting is also the United States' largest recruitment event for philosophy jobs, with numerous universities sending teams to interview candidates for academic posts. The two evening receptions are traditionally referred to as 'smokers,' a carry over from the days in which smoking was common. These events serve the dual purpose of informally continuing interviews and catching up with friends from across the country.

== Presidents ==
The presidency of a division of the American Philosophical Association is considered to be a professional honor.

Recent presidents of the Eastern Division include:

- Louise Antony
- Sally Haslanger
- Miranda Fricker
- Linda Martín Alcoff
- Paul Guyer
- Edward S. Casey
- Daniel Dennett
- Virginia Held
- John Cooper
- T. M. Scanlon
- Stanley Cavell
- Alexander Nehamas
- Ernest Sosa
- Jerry Fodor
- Seyla Benhabib
- Kwame Anthony Appiah
- Christine Korsgaard
- Robert Nozick
- Alasdair MacIntyre
- Lewis White Beck

Recent presidents of the Central Division include:

- Jennifer Lackey
- Russ Shafer-Landau
- Julia Driver
- Jennifer Nagel
- Charles Mills
- Valerie Tiberius
- Linda Zagzebski
- Elizabeth Anderson
- Steven Nadler
- Margaret Atherton
- Peter Railton
- Claudia Card
- Sally Sedgwick
- Peter van Inwagen
- James P. Sterba
- Ted Cohen
- Eleonore Stump
- Karl Ameriks
- Stephen Darwall
- Marcia Baron
- Allan Gibbard
- Lawrence Sklar
- Martha Nussbaum

Recent presidents of the Pacific Division include:

- Terence Parsons
- John Martin Fischer
- Alison Wylie
- Calvin Normore
- Jeffrie Murphy
- Hubert Dreyfus
- Richard Wollheim
- Paul Churchland

== Prizes ==
The American Philosophical Association awards several prizes. A prominent example is the American Philosophical Association Book Prize (formerly known as the Matchette Foundation Book Prize, one of the oldest prizes in philosophy). It is awarded biannually to the best book published in the field over a two-year period by a "younger scholar" (defined as someone age 40 or younger at the time of publication or someone who received his or her Ph.D. 10 or fewer years before the time of publication). Awarded for the first time in 2000, the Book Prize is now awarded in odd years, alternating with the Article Prize awarded in even years. The APA Book Prize has been won by such figures as David Kellogg Lewis, Lawrence Sklar, Bas van Fraassen, Michael Friedman, Loran Lomasky, Paul Guyer, John Cooper, Ted Sider, and Michael Smith. Another of the most distinguished prizes is the Royce Lectures in the philosophy of mind, awarded to a distinguished philosopher every four years. They have been delivered by Robert Stalnaker, Jerry Fodor, Hilary Putnam, Sydney Shoemaker, Saul Kripke, and Elizabeth Anscombe. Another such prize is the Rockefeller Prize. The Rockefeller Prize ($1,000) is awarded every two years for the best unpublished article-length work in philosophy by a non-academically affiliated philosopher. The winning work is then published in the Journal of Value Inquiry at the behest of the winner and the journal.

== Society for German Idealism and Romanticism ==
The Society for German Idealism and Romanticism (SGIR) is affiliated with the American Philosophical Association and deals with investigations on German idealists, German romantics and their immediate influencers. Gerad Gentry is the president of SGIR. The society publishes the online only, open access journal SGIR Review which publishes papers in the fields of philosophy and Germanic studies.

== Other philosophical societies ==
While the APA serves as the main learned society for philosophy professors in North America, many other philosophy societies have sprung up to serve as venues for philosophers to specialize.

Next to the APA, the second largest philosophic society is the Society for Phenomenology and Existential Philosophy, which was created in 1962 by American philosophers who were interested in continental philosophy, some of whom were dissatisfied with the analytic approach of the APA. Since then, however, many members of SPEP have participated extensively in the APA and have also served in leadership positions, including Linda Alcoff and Edward S. Casey.

== See also ==
- Barwise Prize
- Carus Lectures
- Journal of the American Philosophical Association
- Journal of the History of Philosophy
- PLATO (The Philosophy Learning and Teaching Organization)
