= Stephen Yablo =

Canadian-born American philosopher

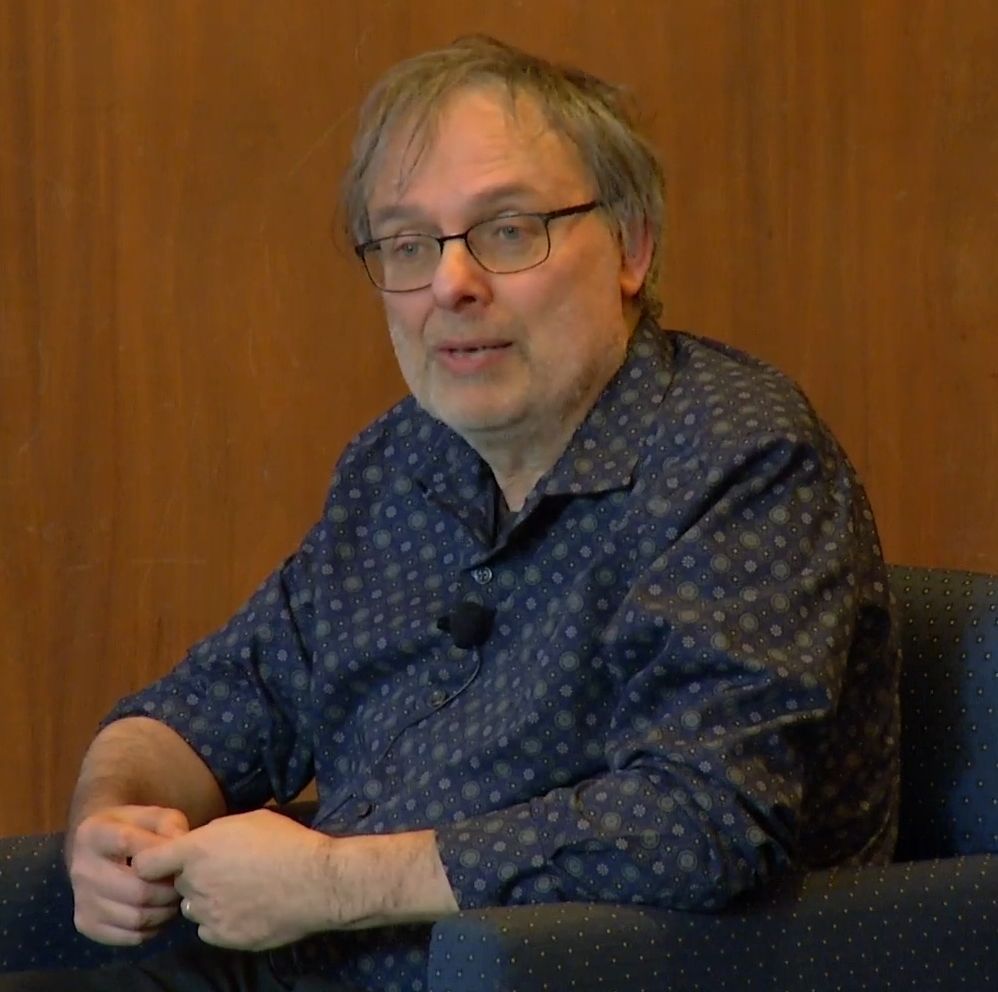
- Yablo in 2022
- Born: 30 September 1957 (age 69); Toronto, Canada
- Spouse: Sally Haslanger

Education
- Education: University of Toronto (B.Sc.); University of California, Berkeley (Ph.D.)
- Doctoral advisor: Donald Davidson

Philosophical work
- Era: Contemporary philosophy
- Region: Western philosophy
- School: Analytic
- Institutions: University of Michigan; University of Toronto; Massachusetts Institute of Technology
- Doctoral students: Carolina Sartorio
- Main interests: Philosophical logic, philosophy of language, philosophy of mathematics, philosophy of mind
- Notable ideas: Yablo's paradox

Stephen Yablo (/ˈjæbloʊ/; born 1957) is a Canadian-born American philosopher. He is the Emeritus David W. Skinner Professor of Philosophy at the Massachusetts Institute of Technology (MIT) and taught previously at the University of Michigan, Ann Arbor. He specializes in the philosophy of logic, philosophy of mind, metaphysics, philosophy of language, and philosophy of mathematics.

== Life and career ==
He was born in Toronto, on 30 September 1957, to a Polish father Saul Yablo and Romanian-Canadian mother Gloria Yablo (née Herman), both Jewish. He is married to fellow MIT philosopher Sally Haslanger.

His Ph.D. is from University of California, Berkeley, where he worked with Donald Davidson and George Myro. In 2012, he was elected a Fellow of the American Academy of Arts and Sciences.

== Philosophical work ==
Yablo has published a number of influential papers in philosophy of mind, philosophy of language, and metaphysics, and gave the John Locke Lectures at Oxford in 2012, which formed the basis for his book Aboutness, which one reviewer described as "an important and far-reaching book that philosophers will be discussing for a long time."

=== Yablo's paradox ===
In papers published in 1985 and 1993, Yablo showed how to create a paradox similar to the liar paradox, but without self-reference. Unlike the liar paradox, which uses a single sentence, Yablo's paradox uses an infinite list of sentences, each referring to sentences occurring later in the list. Analysis of the list shows that there is no consistent way to assign truth values to any of its members. Since everything on the list refers only to later sentences, Yablo claims that his paradox is "not in any way circular". However, Graham Priest disputes this.

==== Statement ====
Consider the following infinite set of sentences:

S_{1}: For each i > 1, S_{i} is not true.
S_{2}: For each i > 2, S_{i} is not true.
S_{3}: For each i > 3, S_{i} is not true.
...

==== Analysis ====
For any n, the proposition S_{n} is of universally quantified form, expressing an unending number of claims (each the negation of a statement with a larger index). As a proposition, any S_{n} also expresses that S_{n + 1} is not true, for example.

For any pair of numbers n and m with n < m, the proposition S_{n} subsumes all the claims also made by the later S_{m}. As this holds for all such pairs of numbers, one finds that all S_{n} imply any S_{m} with n < m. For example, any S_{n} implies S_{n + 1}.

Claims made by any of the propositions ("the next statement is not true") stand in contradiction with an implication we can also logically derive from the lot (the validity of the next statement is implied by the current one). This establishes that assuming any S_{n} leads to a contradiction. And this just means that all S_{n} are proven false.

But all S_{n} being false also exactly validates the very claims made by them. So we have the paradox that each sentence in Yablo's list is both not true and true.

==== First-order logic ====
For any $P$, the negation introduction principle of propositional logic negates $P\leftrightarrow \neg P$. So no consistent theory proves that one of its propositions equivalent to its own negation. Metalogically, it means any axiom of the form of such an equivalence is inconsistent. This is one formal pendant of the liar paradox.

Similarly, for any unary predicate $Q$ and if $R$ is an entire transitive relation, then by a formal analysis as above, predicate logic negates the universal closure of

$$Q(n) \leftrightarrow \forall i. \big(R(i, n)\to \neg Q(i)\big)$$

On the natural numbers, for $R$ taken to be equality "$=$", this also follows from the analysis of the liar paradox. For $R$ taken to be the standard order "$>$", it is still possible to obtain a non-standard model of arithmetic for the omega-inconsistent theory defined by adjoining all the equivalences individually.

== Books ==
- Thoughts (Philosophical Papers, volume 1) (Oxford University Press, 2009)
- Things (Philosophical Papers, volume 2) (Oxford University Press, 2010)
- Aboutness (Princeton University Press, 2014).
