= Gourman Report =

Ranking report published by Princeton Review

The Gourman Report (ISBN 9780679783749) is Dr. Jack Gourman's ranking of undergraduate, professional, and graduate programs in American and International Universities. It has been widely criticized for not disclosing criteria or ranking methods, as well as for reporting statistically impossible data, such as no ties among schools, school rankings in each subcategory (administration, faculty, library, alumni, etc.), which are identical to the overall rankings, narrow gaps in scores with no variation in gap widths, and ranks of nonexistent departments. The Princeton Review, a for-profit publisher of achievement tests and college guidebooks, publishes the Gourman Report. The most recent edition dates to 1997.

== See also ==
- College and university rankings
- Philosophical Gourmet Report
