= Carus Lectures =

Lecture series convened by the American Philosophical Association

The Carus Lectures are a prestigious series of three lectures presented over three consecutive days in plenary sessions at a divisional meeting of the American Philosophical Association. The series was founded in 1925 with John Dewey as the inaugural presenter. The series was scheduled irregularly until 1995, when they were scheduled to occur every two years. The series is named in honor of Paul Carus by Mary Carus and is published by Open Court. In his introduction to the inaugural speech, Hartley Burr Alexander praised the series as an unusual opportunity of presenting ideas "with no institutional atmosphere to further the free play of the mind upon all phases of life."

== Lecturers ==
- 1925 John Dewey "Experience and Nature" Inaugural lecture
- 1925–1939 William Montague "Great Visions of Philosophy"
- 1925–1939 A. O. Lovejoy "The Revolt Against Dualism"
- 1930 George H. Mead "The Philosophy of the Present"
- 1939 E. B. McGilvary "Toward a Perspective Realism"
- 1945 C. I. Lewis "An Analysis of Knowledge"
- 1945 Morris R. Cohen "The Meaning of Human History"
- 1949 C. J. Ducasse "Nature, Mind, and Death"
- 1953 J. Loewenberg "Reason and the Nature of Things"
- 1955 A. E. Murphy "An Inquiry Concerning Moral Understanding"
- 1957 George Boas "The Inquiring Mind"
- 1959 Brand Blanshard "Reason and Analysis"
- 1963 Ernest Nagel "The Dimensions of Critical Philosophy"
- 1964 Stephen Pepper "Concept and Quality"
- 1965 Richard McKeon "Facts, Categories, Experience"
- 1967 Roderick Chisholm "Person and Object: A Metaphysical Study"
- 1970 Carl G. Hempel "Problems and Changes in the Empiricist Conception of Theories"
- 1972 W. V. O. Quine "The Roots of Reference"
- 1974 William Frankena "Three Questions about Morality"
- 1976 Gregory Vlastos "The Status of Persons in Platonic Justice"
- 1977 Wilfrid Sellars "Foundations for a Metaphysics of Pure Process"
- 1980 Donald Davidson "The Grounds of Truth and Value"
- 1983 Paul Grice "The Conception of Value"
- 1985 Hilary Putnam "The Many Faces of Realism"
- 1988 Stanley Cavell "Emersonian Strains: 'The American Scholar and Heidegger on Thinking,' 'Experience and Wittgenstein Skepticism,' and 'Self-Reliance and American Cinema"
- 1990 Kurt Baier "The Rational and the Moral Order"
- 1995 Annette Baier "The Commons of the Mind"
- 1997 Alasdair MacIntyre "Dependent Rational Animals"
- 1999 Ruth Barcan Marcus (Withdrew/Cancelled)
- 2001 Arthur Danto "The Revolt Against Beauty"
- 2003 Judith J. Thomson "Normativity"
- 2005 Tyler Burge "Perceptual Objectivity"
- 2007 Bas van Fraassen "Appearance, Reality, and [the] I"
- 2010 Ernest Sosa
- 2012 Sally Haslanger "Doing Justice to the Social"
- 2013 Kwame Anthony Appiah "Ideals and Idealization"
- 2015 Claudia Card "Surviving Homophobia," "Gratitude to the Decent Rescuer"
- 2017 Nancy Cartwright "Nature, the Artful Modeller: She Reads the New Yorker, Trusts in God, and Takes Short Views"

== See also ==
- Carus Mathematical Monographs
