= Sally Haslanger =

American philosopher

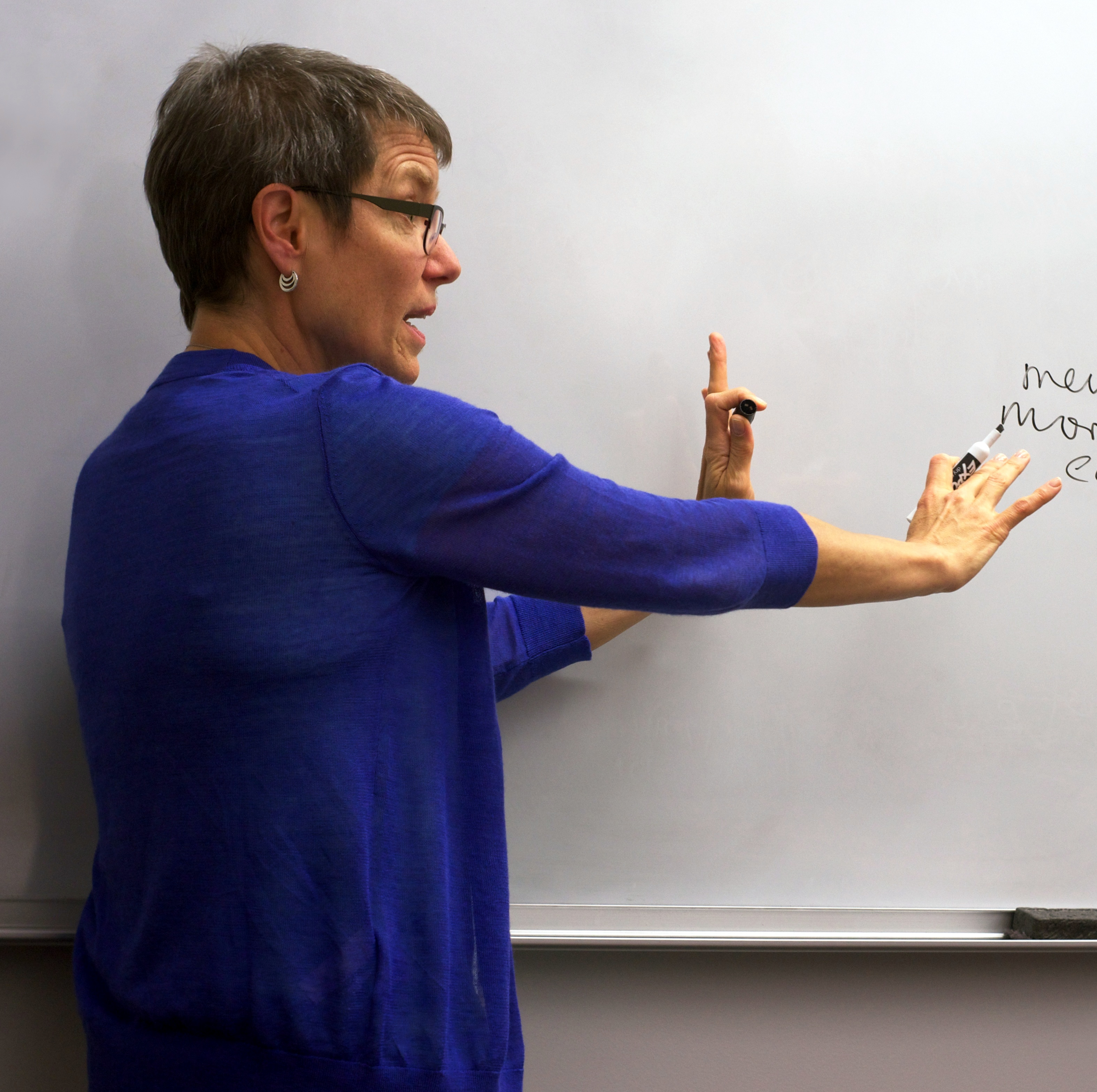
- Haslanger in 2013
- Born: 1955 (age 70–71); Connecticut, U.S.
- Spouse: Stephen Yablo
- Awards: Guggenheim Fellowship (2018); Carus Lecturer (2011); SWIP Distinguished Woman Philosopher Award (2010)

Education
- Education: Reed College (BA); University of Virginia (MA); University of California, Berkeley (PhD)
- Doctoral advisor: Alan Code, A. A. Long, George Myro

Philosophical work
- Era: Contemporary philosophy
- Region: Western philosophy
- School: Analytic philosophy, analytic feminism, critical theory, social constructionism
- Institutions: Massachusetts Institute of Technology
- Main interests: Metaphysics, epistemology, feminist theory, political philosophy, critical race theory
- Notable works: Resisting Reality: Social Construction and Social Critique (2012)
- Notable ideas: Social construction of race and race

Sally Haslanger (/ˈhæsləŋər/; born 1955) is an American philosopher and the Ford Professor of Philosophy in the Department of Linguistics and Philosophy at the Massachusetts Institute of Technology.

Haslanger earned her Ph.D. in philosophy from the University of California, Berkeley in 1985. She has taught at Princeton University, the University of Pennsylvania, and the University of Michigan, Ann Arbor. Haslanger is known for her work on social and political theory, feminism, and philosophy of gender and race.

== Biography ==
Haslanger graduated from Reed College in 1977 with a B.A. in philosophy and earned her Ph.D. in philosophy from the University of California, Berkeley, in 1985.

Haslanger was selected as the 2011 Carus Lecturer by the American Philosophical Association. The Society for Women in Philosophy named her a 2010 Distinguished Woman Philosopher, citing her as one of the "best analytic feminists" in the United States. Haslanger was president of the Eastern Division of the American Philosophical Association and in 2015 was elected to the American Academy of Arts & Sciences. In 2018, she was awarded a Guggenheim Fellowship. She co-edits the online publication Symposia on Gender, Race and Philosophy.

Haslanger held the 2015 Spinoza Chair of Philosophy at the University of Amsterdam. In 2023, she gave the Walter Benjamin lectures hosted by the Humboldt University in Berlin.

She is married to fellow MIT philosopher Stephen Yablo.

== Philosophical work ==
Video about the main contributions by Haslanger. English subtitles.

Haslanger has published in metaphysics, feminist metaphysics, epistemology, feminist theory, ancient philosophy, and social and political philosophy. She writes that much of her work has focused on persistence through change; objectivity and objectification; and Catharine MacKinnon's theory of gender. She has done work on the social construction of categories often considered to be natural kinds, particularly race and gender. A collection of her major papers on these topics appeared as Resisting Reality: Social Construction and Social Critique (Oxford University Press, 2012), which won the American Philosophical Association's Joseph B. Gittler Award in 2014. This prize is given for an outstanding scholarly contribution in the field of the philosophy of one or more of the social sciences.

=== Definition of gender ===
One of Haslanger's most influential notions is her analytic definition of "woman". Her definition is as follows:

S is a woman iff_{df} S is systematically subordinated along some dimension (economic, political, legal, social, etc.), and S is "marked" as a target for this treatment by observed or imagined bodily features presumed to be evidence of a female’s biological role in reproduction.

The definition has been criticized, including by Haslanger herself - who no longer stands by this definition completely, on the grounds that it marginalizes trans women (Katharine Jenkins) and that it excludes the Queen of The United Kingdom (Mari Mikkola).

== Published works ==
- Theorizing Feminisms: A Reader (co-edited with Elizabeth Hackett), Oxford University Press, 2005.
- Adoption Matters: Philosophical and Feminist Essays (co-edited with Charlotte Witt), Cornell University Press, 2005.
- Persistence: Contemporary Readings (co-edited with Roxanne Marie Kurtz), MIT Press, 2006.
- Resisting Reality: Social Construction and Social Critique, Oxford University Press, 2012.
- Critical Theory and Practice, Koninklijke Van Gorcum, 2017.
