= Arthur Edward Murphy =

American philosopher

Arthur Edward Murphy (September 1, 1901 – May 11, 1962) was an American philosopher.

== Life and career ==
Murphy was born in Ithaca, New York. He earned a bachelor's degree in philosophy from University of California, Berkeley in 1923, then went on to earn a doctorate there. He took an appointment at University of Chicago in 1927, then went to Cornell University in 1928 before returning to Chicago in 1929. He took a position as full professor at Brown University in 1931.

In 1939 he became department chair at University of Illinois, and then served in the same position at Cornell University from 1946 to 1953. That year, he took the same position at University of Washington. In 1957, he came to University of Texas as a visiting professor before being appointed chair in 1958. Murphy had a long-term serious cardiac condition, and he died in Austin, Texas at age 60.

== Selected works ==
- The Theory of Practical Reason
- The Uses of Reason (Carus Lecture Series)
- Reason, Reality, and Speculative Philosophy
- Reason and the Common Good
- Philosophy in American Education
