= Carolina Sartorio =

American philosopher

Education
- Education: University of Buenos Aires, Argentina (BA), MIT (PhD)
- Thesis: The causal and the moral (2003)
- Doctoral advisor: Stephen Yablo

Philosophical work
- Era: Contemporary philosophy
- Region: Western philosophy
- School: Analytic philosophy
- Institutions: Rutgers University, University of Arizona
- Main interests: Metaphysics, philosophy of action, ethics

Carolina Sartorio is an American philosopher and professor of philosophy at Rutgers University. Previously she taught at the University of Arizona. She is known for her works on free will.

== Books ==
- Causation and Free Will, Oxford University Press 2016 (Paperback: 2019)
- Do We Have Free Will? A Debate, with Robert Kane, Routledge 2021
