= Sally Sedgwick =

American philosopher

- Born: 1956 (age 69–70)

Education
- Education: University of Chicago (PhD, 1985)
- Thesis: Formalism in Kant's Ethics (1985)
- Doctoral advisor: Manley Thompson

Philosophical work
- Era: Contemporary philosophy
- Region: Western philosophy
- School: Kantianism
- Institutions: University of Illinois at Chicago, Boston University; University of Illinois Chicago
- Main interests: Hegel, Kant, ethics, epistemology
- Website: https://www.sallysedgwick.net/

Sally Sedgwick (born 1956) is an American philosopher who is a professor of philosophy at Boston University and was previously the LAS Distinguished Professor at the Department of Philosophy, University of Illinois at Chicago.

== Education and career ==
Sedgwick earned her BA in philosophy from University of California, Santa Cruz and her Ph.D. in 1985, in philosophy from University of Chicago under the direction of Manley Thompson. She taught philosophy at Dartmouth College from 1985 until 2003, when she moved to the University of Illinois, Chicago. In January 2019, she joined the department at Boston University.

== Philosophical work ==
Sedgwick is best known for her work on Kant, Hegel, and especially the relation between the two philosophers. The result of her analysis of this relation was published in a very well-received monograph, Hegel's Critique of Kant: From Dichotomy to Identity. Sedgwick argues that Hegel criticized Kant for his ambitions to give an account of human cognition in terms of necessary and non-historical categories. She is now working on the details of Hegel's philosophy of history and its relation to his theory of knowledge and ethics.

Sedgwick has been awarded various grants by the NEH, ACLS, DAAD, Fulbright, and the Alexander von Humboldt Foundation. She has been a visiting professor at University of Pennsylvania, Harvard University, University of Bonn, University of Bern, and Universität Luzern. In 2009, Sedgwick was appointed the president of the Central Division of the American Philosophical Association.

== Bibliography ==
=== Books ===
==== Monographs ====
- Hegel's Critique of Kant. Oxford University Press. 2012-03-29. doi:10.1093/acprof:oso/9780199698363.001.0001. ISBN 978-0-19-969836-3.
- Kant's Groundwork of the Metaphysics of Morals: An Introduction. Cambridge Introductions to Key Philosophical Texts. Cambridge: Cambridge University Press. 2008. doi:10.1017/cbo9780511809538. ISBN 978-0-521-84345-4.

==== Editorials ====
- Sedgwick, Sally, ed. (2000). The Reception of Kant's Critical Philosophy: Fichte, Schelling, and Hegel. Cambridge: Cambridge University Press. doi:10.1017/cbo9780511527265. ISBN 978-0-521-77237-2.

=== Articles ===
- "McDowell's Hegelianism". European Journal of Philosophy. 5 (1): 21–38. 1997. doi:10.1111/1468-0378.00025. ISSN 1468-0378.
