= Carlin Romano =

American historian

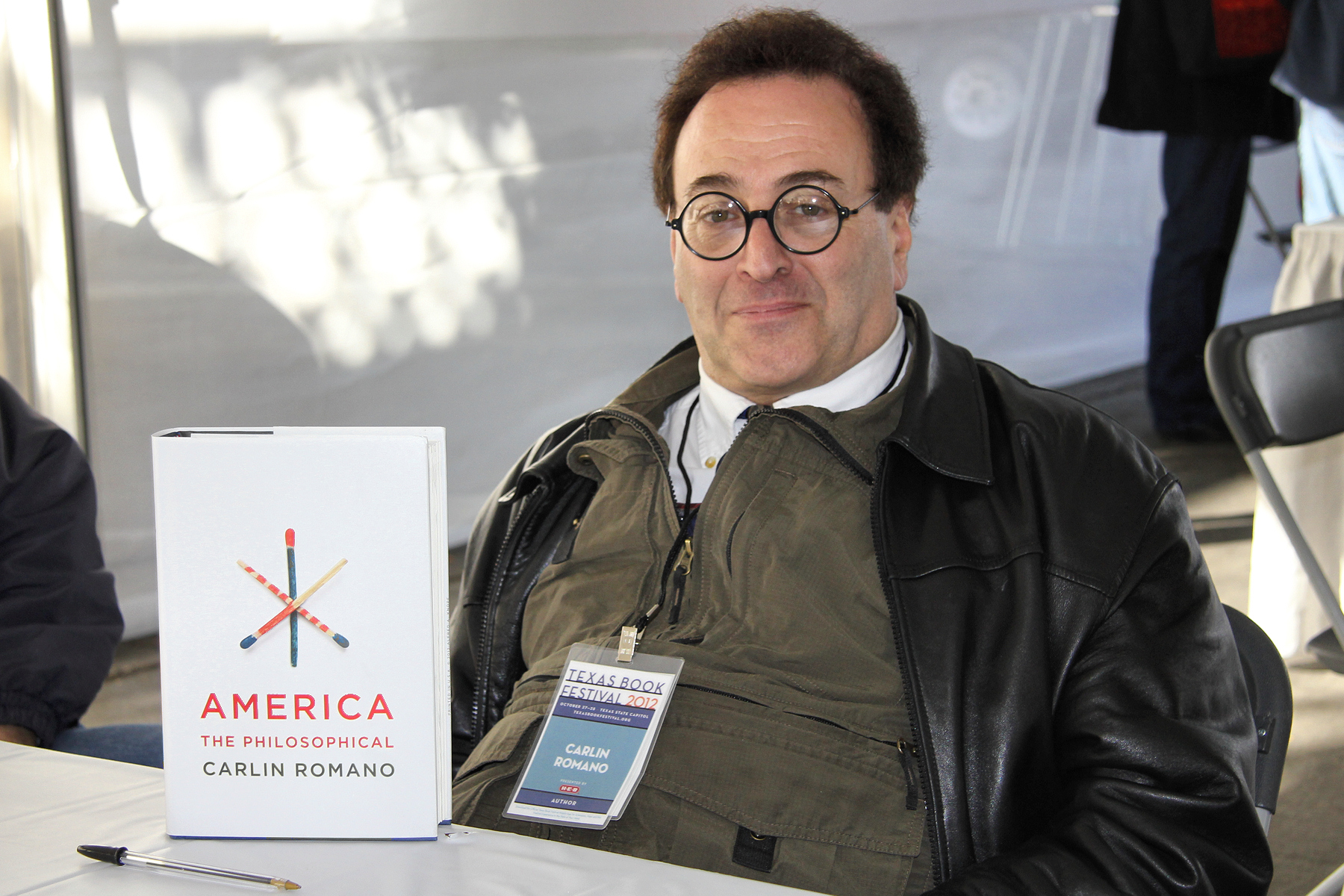
- Born: Brooklyn, New York, U.S.
- Education: Princeton University; Yale University; Columbia University
- Occupation: Writer

Carlin Romano is an American writer and educator. Romano writes for The Chronicle of Higher Education.

== Career ==
Romano was a writer for The Philadelphia Inquirer. He teaches at the University of Pennsylvania's Annenberg School for Communication. He previously taught at Ursinus College and Bennington College.

In 1981, Romano reviewed books about philosophers for The Village Voice Literary Supplement and one book for The New Yorker. His writing has appeared in The Wall Street Journal, The Nation, The Weekly Standard, Times Literary Supplement, and elsewhere.

Romano contributed an article on Umberto Eco to Oxford University Press's Encyclopedia of Aesthetics. In 1993, Romano wrote an essay for Danto and His Critics entitled, "Looking Beyond the Visible: The Case of Arthur C. Danto," about art critic Arthur Danto. In his essay, Romano sets up a dichotomy between "pragmatism" and "Hegelianism" and finds statements in Danto's books that he claims fit into one of these two schools of thought. The Institution of Philosophy: A Discipline in Crisis? (published 1989 by Open Court, edited by Avner Cohen and Marcelo Dascal), includes a proposal by Romano to set up a World Court of Philosophy in which appointed philosophers would stipulate philosophical conclusions.

He wrote America the Philosophical, a book with the main claim that the current United States has the "most philosophical culture in the history of the world."

In 2013 he was awarded a John Simon Guggenheim Memorial Foundation fellowship.

In June 2020 Romano was at the center of a controversy within the board of the National Book Critics Circle (NBCC), on which Romano has served periodically since the 1990s. In private communications between board members that were later leaked on social media, Romano objected to parts of the NBCC board's forthcoming statement in support of the Black Lives Matter movement and characterized the statement's overall message as "absolute nonsense". The fallout from his comments, which some of his fellow NBCC board members viewed as racist, spurred waves of resignations by more than half of the NBCC board members, leaving the future of the institution and its leadership uncertain.

== Life ==
Romano was born in Brooklyn, New York. He received his Bachelor of Arts in philosophy from Princeton University. He took an M.Phil. in philosophy from Yale University and a J.D. from Columbia University. One of the Fulbright Scholars in 2002, he lectured at Smolny State University, St. Petersburg. He was a Joan Shorenstein Center fellow in 1993. and a National Arts Journalism Program Fellow at Columbia University in 1998. In 1989 Romano received an Eisenhower Fellowship; in his case to travel to Israel. He is an ongoing elected Fellow of the New York Institute for the Humanities at New York University.

== Controversial critiques ==
=== Martin Heidegger ===
In the October 18, 2009 issue of The Chronicle, in "Heil Heidegger!", citing Heidegger's well-known past Nazi affiliations, Romano was highly critical of Martin Heidegger's work and its continued acceptance amongst American academics and intellectuals. The article was a review of the publication in English of French philosopher Emmanuel Faye's Heidegger: The Introduction of Nazism into Philosophy in Light of the Unpublished Seminars of 1933–1935 (first published in 2005, in France), highly critical of Heidegger for the same reason. Romano called on librarians to stop stocking the collected works of the German philosopher, which appear under the term Heidegger Gesamtausgabe. This controversial article renewed public dialogue about the relation between a person's politics and the merit of their work.

=== Catharine MacKinnon ===
The publication of "the most controversial by far" Only Words book review, written by Romano, provoked a strong reaction with his imagined description of himself raping the author, Catharine MacKinnon. This performative counterexample to MacKinnon's apparent contention that a rape in words is equivalent to a rape in deeds intensified the debate about legal sanctions against pornography. The philosopher Nancy Bauer in How to Do Things With Pornography described it as "a shockingly clueless and callous review." David Gates wrote, "Free-speech stalwart Nat Hentoff jumped in—on MacKinnon's side, claiming Romano 'set out to debase [her] person, along with her ideas.'" Romano said in defense of this review, "The worst thing that can happen to a flamboyant claim is to be tested by a good example."

=== Philip Roth ===
In a 2007 book review of Philip Roth's Exit Ghost, Romano revived the long-standing controversy over the extent that Roth's fiction is autobiographical. He used Claire Bloom's 1996 memoir Leaving a Doll's House as proof that Roth's books are "more autobiographical than imaginative."

=== Richard Rorty ===
In a 2007 elegy of Richard Rorty, Romano's characterization of his subject's originality and creativity drew an extended refutation from the philosopher Brian Leiter.

== Books ==
He wrote America the Philosophical, a book with the main claim that the current United States has the "most philosophical culture in the history of the world."
