= Berit Brogaard =

Danish–American philosopher (born 1970)

Berit Oskar Brogaard
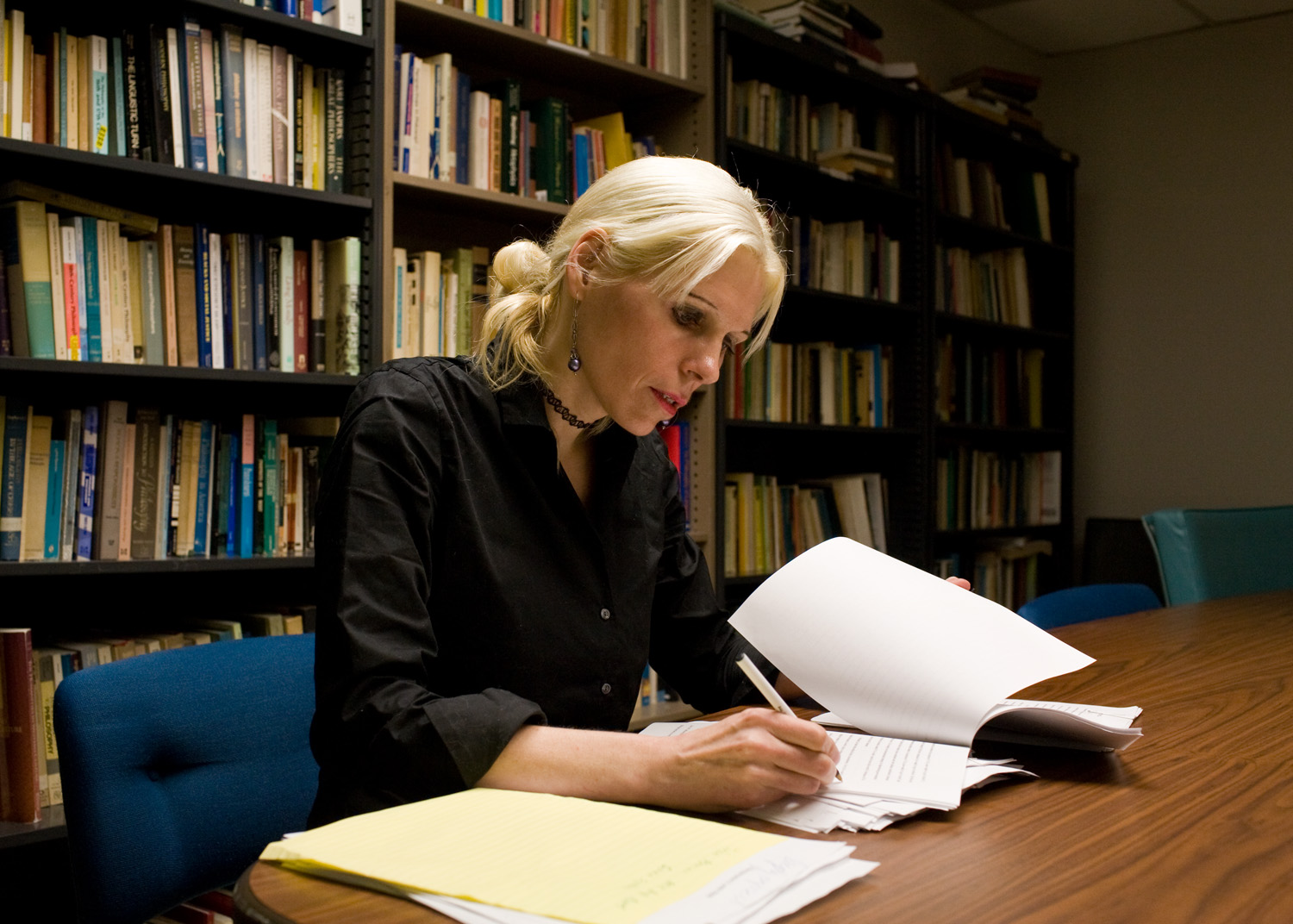
- Brogaard in 2010
- Born: 28 August 1970 (age 55); Copenhagen, Denmark

Education
- Education: University at Buffalo
- Doctoral advisor: Barry Smith

Philosophical work
- Era: Contemporary philosophy
- Region: Western philosophy
- School: Analytic
- Main interests: Philosophy of mind; Cognitive neuroscience; Philosophy of language
- Notable ideas: Synesthesia as a gateway to hidden areas of the brain; left-brain activation during visual memory; perceptual reports; primitive color properties; dynamic two-dimensional semantics

Berit Oskar Brogaard (born August 28, 1970) is a Danish–American philosopher specializing in the areas of cognitive neuroscience, philosophy of mind, and philosophy of language. Her recent work concerns synesthesia, savant syndrome, blindsight and perceptual reports. She is professor of philosophy and runs a perception lab at the University of Miami in Coral Gables, Florida. She was also co-editor of the Philosophical Gourmet Report until 2021.

== Education and career ==
Brogaard was born and raised in Copenhagen. From an early age, she excelled at physics, mathematics, and biology, eventually completing her undergraduate education at the University of Copenhagen with a bachelor's degree in linguistics and philosophy. She then studied neuroscience under the direction of Thue Schwartz at University of Copenhagen and the Danish National Hospital.

Upon completion of her degrees in Copenhagen she studied linguistics and philosophy at the University at Buffalo, where she obtained her PhD with Barry Smith as her supervisor. She was a postdoctoral fellow at the Centre for Consciousness and the Philosophy Program directed by David Chalmers at the Australian National University from 2007 to 2009, and her first tenure-track position was at Southern Illinois University, Edwardsville, from 2001 to 2005. She was subsequently appointed associate professor of philosophy (2008–2012) and Professor of Philosophy (2012–2014) at University of Missouri, St. Louis. She has taught at the University of Miami since 2014.

She has been President of the Southern Society for Philosophy and Psychology and was the first female President of the Central States Philosophical Association. Brogaard is also a Danish-language poet. She is co-editor of the Philosophical Gourmet Report, a ranking of philosophy graduate programs, since 2014.

Since 2009 Brogaard has worked as a freelance writer for many popular media outlets, including Psychology Today, Hello Magazine and the Lance Armstrong Foundation. Since then she has written about 300 popular articles on brain intervention and emotional regulation. She has also co-authored a breakup program with counselor and relationship expert Catherine Behan entitled The Breakup Cleanse. Brogaard's research regarding relationships has been featured in publications like Cosmopolitan where she addresses physiological components to having people one is romantically interested in not responding, or responding apathetically to their text messages. Additionally, she has written about other contemporary social dynamics such as how to handle the consequences of work-place gossip, using reverse psychology to handle undesirable work environments, and common emotional warning signs between relationship partners.

Her academic and popular work has been featured in, among other places, A Report of the President's Council on Bioethics - Washington D.C. 2004, Danish National Radio, The Modesto Bee, UMSL newsroom, MostMost, Attract Your Soul Mate Now, Nightline, NPR, Popular Science, Science Omega, the Huffington Post, and ABC News.

== Philosophical work ==
=== Cognitive neuroscience ===
In the area of cognitive neuroscience Brogaard is best known for her work on synesthesia and savant syndrome. Her team, which consists of colleagues from the Brogaard Lab for Multisensory Research, and the Visual Awareness and Cognition Group, Brain Research Unit, Low Temperature Laboratory, Aalto University School of Science, Finland, has completed a series of studies on Jason Padgett, who has acquired savant syndrome and acquired synesthesia. Padgett was mugged in 2002. He was hit on his head and developed a form of synesthesia and savant syndrome. Certain objects and mathematical formulas trigger synesthetic mathematical fractals in him. He is the first to hand-draw mathematical fractals, an ability he acquired after the incident.

In a series of functional MRI studies in Finland, Brogaard's team found uni-lateral left-side activity in the parietal and frontal areas when Padgett is exposed to well-formed mathematical formulas that give rise to synesthetic fractals in him and bi-lateral activation when he is exposed to nonsense formulas or formulas that don't give rise to synesthetic fractals.

They re-tested the results from the Functional magnetic resonance imaging (fMRI) using transcranial magnetic stimulation (TMS). In the TMS study, Padgett was shown formulas and asked to rate his synesthetic sensation on a scale 1–10, relative to his "baseline" percept (i.e. without TMS). They applied TMS over the brain areas that were activated in the fMRI scan with the formulas that give rise to synesthetic experiences and found the TMS modulated two central areas.

The results establish for the first time that synesthetic imagery may be generated in areas of the brain not normally used for the creation of visual imagery.

Brogaard's lab has also studied the cognitive mechanisms underlying grapheme–color synesthesia, one of the most common forms of synesthesia. Using a novel visual search paradigm to examine whether synesthetic colors guide the subject's attention to the location of the target they found that synesthetic experience requires selective attention to occur. In light of this they propose a new long term potentiation model for grapheme-color projector synesthesia.

Brogaard has also contributed to the topic of whether there are unconscious perceptual processes, arguing that cases of blindsight and visual for action involve unconscious perceptual processes.

=== Philosophy of mind ===
In the area of philosophy of mind, Brogaard is the first to provide a thorough analysis of perceptual words such as 'look', 'sound', 'feel', 'taste', 'smell', 'seem', 'appear', 'see' and 'hear'. She argues that perceptual reports containing these words reflect the content of perception.

Brogaard is also the first researcher to show that consciousness comes in degrees and that there can be borderline cases of consciousness. Imagine a case where we slowly destroy the primary visual cortex of a subject, one neuron at a time in an arbitrary fashion. Plausibly such an individual would proceed slowly from perceiving her surroundings normally to perceiving them unconsciously. In this process, the brightness of the perceived content would gradually decrease until a point at which it would be unclear whether the perception counted as weakly conscious.

Or consider George Sperling's classic experiment in which a 3 x 3 array of letters was briefly flashed to the test subjects. Most subjects said that they were aware of all the letters, even though they could report only about half of them. To test whether the subjects were right, Sperling used a tone after the presentation of the stimulus to signal which row the subjects should report (high tone = top row, medium tone = middle row and low tone = the bottom row). The subjects were able to name the letters in the indicated row but they were unable to report any other numbers. The fact that the subjects were able to report any signaled row indicates that they were phenomenally conscious of all the rows but did not have access consciousness to all of them. But suppose we were to flash a 4 x 4 array of letters, then a 5 x 5 array of letters, then 6 x 6 array of letters, and so on, to subjects in an experiment. In that case, it would naturally become harder and harder for them to report the rows as the array became increasingly more complicated. There would, however, be no precise cut-off at which the subjects would go from being weakly conscious to not being weakly conscious of all the rows.

=== Philosophy of language ===
Brogaard is also a well known contributor to the philosophy of language. Brogaard's book, Transient Truths provides the first book-length exposition and defense of temporalism, the view that contents can change their truth-values along with changes in the world. Brogaard argues that temporal contents are contents and propositions in the full sense. This project involves a thorough analysis of how we talk about and retain mental states over time, an examination of how the phenomenology of mental states bear on the content of mental states, an analysis of how we pass on information in temporally extended conversations, and a revival of a-priorian-tense logic. The view suggests a broader view according to which some types of representation have a determinate truth-value only relative to features about the subject who does the representing. If this view is right, successful semantic representation requires an eye on our own position in the world. Brogaard has also offered well known philosophical accounts of moral permissibility, anti-realism, and knowledge-how.

Brogaard is furthermore the first to develop a dynamic two-dimensional semantics that can account for cognitive significance in a dynamic setting.

== Books ==
=== Transient Truths: An Essay in the Metaphysics of Propositions ===
Transient Truths provides a book-length exposition and defense of temporalism, the philosophical theory that the contents of propositions can change their truth-values along with changes in the world. Brogaard argues that temporal contents are contents and propositions in the full sense. The project involves an analysis of how we talk about and retain mental states over time, an examination of how the phenomenology of mental states bear on the content of mental states, an analysis of how we pass on information in temporally extended conversations, and a revival of a Priorian tense logic. Her view suggests a broader view according to which some types of representation have a determinate truth-value only relative to features about the subject who does the representing. If this view is right, successful semantic representation requires an eye on our own position in the world.

=== On Romantic Love: Simple Truths About a Complex Emotion ===
Brogaard argues that love is an emotion; that it can be, at turns, both rational and irrational; and that it can be manifested in degrees. We can love one person more than another and we can love a person a little or a lot or not at all and love is not always something we consciously feel. However, love—like other emotions, both conscious and unconscious—is subject to rational control, and falling in or out of it can be a deliberate choice.

=== The Superhuman Mind: Free the Genius in Your Brain ===
Brogaard and co-author Kristian Marlow argue that our brains constantly process a huge amount of information below our awareness. They posit that individuals with savant syndrome, despite having a variety origins, have managed to gain a degree of conscious access to the brain's innate potent processing power. Delving into the neurological underpinnings of savant syndrome, the book claims that we can acquire some of these skills ourselves—from perfect pitch and lightning fast math skills to supercharged creativity.

=== Seeing and Saying: The Language of Perception and the Representational View of Experience ===
Brogaard argues that perceptual experiences have representational contents. She bases her argument on a linguistic analysis of what we mean when we say that an object appears or looks a certain way to the perceiver. Brogaard then argues on the basis of her analysis of "looks" and "seemings" that perceptual experiences are representational states rather than perceptual relations of direct acquaintance between the perceiver and some external-world fact.

=== Hatred: Understanding Our Most Dangerous Emotion ===
Brogaard explores the moral psychology of personal and group hatred. She argues that personal hatred that can sometimes serve as a reactive attitude to wrongdoing, in Peter Strawson's sense. In her view, personal hatred is thus akin to paradigm reactive attitudes like blame, resentment, and indignation. Unlike personal hatred, she argues, hatred directed toward groups (e.g., anti-Black hatred, misogyny, and hatred toward members of the LGBTQ+ community) is never morally defensible. Brogaard then examines legal theorist Jeremy Waldron's argument for the view that the harm in hate speech lies in its defamatory nature. She argues that this account is unable to accommodate the harm of hate speech that lacks truth-conditions (e.g., a hateful question). She argues that philosopher Jürgen Habermas's theory of communicative rationality (German: kommunikative Rationalität) can be extended to provide a more comprehensive account of the harm in hate speech.

== Bibliography ==
A partial list of publications by Brogaard:

- Berit Brogaard and Michael Slote. Against and for Ethical Naturalism Or: How Not To "Naturalize" Ethics, Americal Philosophical Quarterly, 59(4), 2022, pp. 327–352
- Hatred: Understanding Our Most Dangerous Emotion, Oxford University Press, 2020
- Seeing and Saying: The Language of Perception and the Representational View of Experience, Oxford University Press, 2018
- The Superhuman Mind: Free the Genius in Your Brain, Hudson Street Press, 2015
- On Romantic Love: Simple Truths about a Complex Emotion, Oxford University Press, 2015
- Transient Truths: An Essay in the Metaphysics of Propositions, Oxford University Press, 2012
- Vision for Action and the Contents of Perception, Journal of Philosophy, 2011
- What do We Say When We Say How or What We Feel? , Philosophers Imprint, 2011
- Brogaard, Berit (2011). "Are there unconscious perceptual processes?" (PDF). Consciousness and Cognition. 20 (2): 449–463. doi:10.1016/j.concog.2010.10.002. PMID 21146426. S2CID 15291606.
- Conscious Vision for Action Vs. Unconscious Vision for Action, Cognitive Science, in press
- Color Experience in Blindsight? Philosophical Psychology, in press
- Stupid People Deserve What They Get': The Effects of Personality Assessment on Judgments of Intentional Action, Behavioral and Brain Sciences 33, 2010, 332–334
- Perceptual Reports, forthcoming in Mohan Matthen, ed. Oxford Handbook of the Philosophy of Perception, Oxford: Oxford University Press, 2010
- Are Conscious States Conscious in Virtue of Representing Themselves?, forthcoming in Philosophical Studies
- Perceptual Content and Monadic Truth: On Cappelen and Hawthorne's Relativism and Monadic Truth, forthcoming in David Sosa, ed. Philosophical Books
- Brogaard, Berit (2009). "Strong representationalism and centered content". Philosophical Studies. 151 (3): 373–392. doi:10.1007/s11098-009-9437-z. S2CID 170374723.
- Context and Content: Pragmatics in Two-Dimensional Semantics, Keith Allan and Kasia Jaszczolt, eds. Cambridge Handbook of Pragmatics, 2010
