= Heidi Li Feldman =

American lawyer

Academic background
- Education: Brown University (BA); University of Michigan (JD, PhD)
- Thesis: Legal judgments, thick concepts, and objectivity (1993)
- Doctoral advisor: Peter Railton

Academic work
- Discipline: Law
- Institutions: University of Michigan Law School; Georgetown Law

Heidi Li Feldman is an American professor of law emerita at Georgetown Law. Her areas of research are torts, ethics, political philosophy, and legal theory. She is an elected member of the American Law Institute.

== Education ==
Feldman attended Brown University where she received a Bachelor of Arts in 1986. In 1990, she earned a Juris Doctor from University of Michigan Law School. While in law school, Feldman worked as an associate editor and article editor of the Michigan Law Review. She was a member of the Order of the Coif. Feldman completed a doctorate in philosophy from University of Michigan in 1993. Her 1993 dissertation was titled Legal judgement, thick concepts, and objectivity. Feldman's doctoral advisor was Peter Railton.

== Career ==
Feldman worked as an assistant professor at the University of Michigan Law School from 1991 to 1998. She taught courses on torts, ethics, and law and objectivity. Her research topics are tort law, political philosophy, ethics, and legal theory. In 1997, she joined the faculty at Georgetown Law, where she is a professor of law. In May 2019, Feldman was a guest on the program To the Point with host Warren Olney IV where she discussed the Mueller Report. She is in the news because of a previous tweet regarding students who are Republicans. Ilya Shapiro has quoted her 2020 tweet in the Wall Street Journal: In 2020, Prof. Heidi Feldman of the Law Center tweeted that "law professors and law school deans" should "not support applications from our students to clerk for" judges appointed by President Trump. "To work for such a judge," Ms. Feldman continued, marks a lawyer as lacking in the character and judgment necessary for the practice of law."

== Awards and honors ==
Feldman is an elected member of the American Law Institute.

== Personal life ==
In 2018, Feldman created a GoFundMe on behalf of Christine Blasey Ford that later received $210,000 in donations. In an interview with CNN, Feldman stated that she was motivated to raise funds after hearing about the death threats against Ford. Feldman started another GoFundMe to raise funds to endow a professorship or scholarship in Blasey Ford's name. As of November 2018, it had raised over $30,000.

== Selected works ==
=== Journal articles ===
- Feldman, Heidi Li (1995). "Science and Uncertainty in Mass Exposure Litigation". Georgetown Law Faculty Publications and Other Works. doi:10.60843/5egy-vc42.
- Feldman, Heidi Li (1996). "Codes and Virtues: Can Good Lawyers be Good Ethical Deliberators?". Georgetown Law Faculty Publications and Other Works. doi:10.60843/sjbf-xw70.
- Feldman, Heidi Li (1997). "Harm and Money: Against the Insurance Theory of Tort Compensation". Georgetown Law Faculty Publications and Other Works.
