= Consent theory =

Philosophical idea on the nature of governance

Consent theory is a term for the idea in social philosophy that individuals primarily make decisions as free agents entering into consensual relationships with other free agents, and that this becomes the basis for political governance. An early elaborator of this idea was John Locke, from whom the expression "all men are created equal" can be traced. Consent theory goes back at least to the 16th century.

== Criticism ==
One criticism is after the original administering of consent by the people, subsequent generations often only give tacit consent to the government. Without the power to refuse consent, true consent cannot be given.

== See also ==
- Consent
- Social contract
- Consent of the governed
