= Peter Railton =

American philosopher

- Born: Peter Albert Railton; 23 May 1950 (age 76)
- Spouse: Rebecca J. Scott (m. 1978)

Education
- Doctoral advisor: David Lewis

Philosophical work
- Era: Contemporary philosophy
- Region: Western philosophy
- School: Analytic
- Doctoral students: Heidi Li Feldman, Brian Leiter
- Main interests: Ethics, philosophy of science
- Notable ideas: Moral realism

Peter Albert Railton (born May 23, 1950) is an American philosopher who is Gregory S. Kavka Distinguished University Professor and John Stephenson Perrin Professor of Philosophy Emeritus at the University of Michigan, Ann Arbor, where he has taught since 1979.

== Education and career ==
He earned his Ph.D. from Princeton in 1980, writing a dissertation under the supervision of David K. Lewis.

He was a visiting professor at the University of California, Berkeley and Princeton University. He was elected a Fellow of the American Academy of Arts & Sciences in 2004 and the Norwegian Academy of Science and Letters in 2016.

A public lecture he gave concerning his own struggles with depression attracted widespread notice and praise in the academic community.

== Philosophical work ==
His dissertation concerned scientific explanation. His main research since centers on contemporary metaethics and normative ethics (especially consequentialism). He is the author of the book Facts, Values and Norms (Cambridge University Press, 2003), a collection of his major papers in ethics, and a co-editor (with Stephen Darwall and Allan Gibbard) of Moral Discourse and Practice: Some Philosophical Approaches (Oxford University Press, 1996).

Railton has playfully described himself as a "stark, raving moral realist". However, unlike some moral realists, he thinks moral facts that make moral statements true are natural facts.

== Bibliography ==
- 1984, "Alienation, Consequentialism, and the Demands of Morality," Philosophy and Public Affairs, Vol. 13, No. 2, pp. 134–171.
- 1986, "Moral Realism," The Philosophical Review, Vol. 95, No. 2, pp. 163–207.
- 1991, "Moral Theory As A Moral Practice," Noûs, Vol. 25, No. 2, pp. 185–190.
- 1992, "Some Questions About the Justification of Morality," Philosophical Perspectives, Vol. 6, pp. 27–53.
- 1992, "Pluralism, Determinacy, and Dilemma," Ethics, Vol. 102, No. 4, pp. 720–742.
- 1993, "Noncognitivism about Rationality: Benefits, Costs, and an Alternative," Philosophical Issues, Vol. 4, pp. 36–51.
- 1994, "Truth, Reason, and the Regulation of Belief," Philosophical Issues, Vol. 5, pp. 71–93.
- 1996, "Moral Realism: Prospects and Problems," in Sinnott-Armstrong and Timmons (eds.), Moral Knowledge?, Oxford University Press.
- 1996, Moral Discourse and Practice (co-edited with Stephen Darwall and Allan Gibbard), Oxford University Press.
- 2003, Facts, Values, and Norms, Cambridge University Press.

== Sources ==
- 4 U-M scholars named AAAS fellows
