= Henry Clay Nelson =

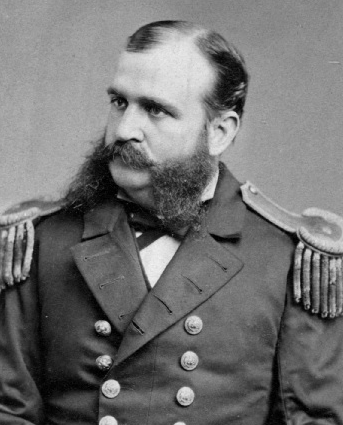
- Born: May 30, 1835; Warfieldsburg, Maryland, US
- Died: March 10, 1893 (aged 57); Concord, New Hampshire, US
- Military career
- Allegiance: United States
- Branch: United States Navy
- Service years: 1861–1884
- Conflicts: American Civil War

Henry Clay Nelson (May 30, 1835 – March 10, 1893) was a surgeon in the United States Navy during and after the American Civil War.

Nelson was born on May 30, 1835, in Frederick County, now Carroll County, Maryland, likely in the vicinity of Warfieldsburg, to Miranda Nelson (née Pearre) and Burgess Nelson. He entered the Navy as an Assistant Surgeon in 1861, in 1864 he was promoted to the rank of Surgeon, and in 1879 to Medical Inspector. In 1877 he served as a Fleet Surgeon of the Pacific Squadron and for several years had been Assistant Surgeon General. On March 22, 1877, he married Adelaide Margaretta Nelson (née Thompson), with whom he had a son Francis.

Nelson retired on April 24, 1884, due to ill health and died at the age of 57 on March 10, 1893, in Concord, New Hampshire.
