= Harold S. Nelson =

American politician (1890–1972)

Harold S. Nelson (March 13, 1890 – October 27, 1972) was an American lawyer and politician.

Nelson was born in Owatonna, Steele County, Minnesota, and went to the Owatonna public schools. He lived in Owatonna, Minnesota with his wife and family. Nelson graduated from Pillsbury Academy in Owatonna. Nelson went to the University of Minnesota and received his law degree from the University of Minnesota Law School. He also went to King's College London.

Nelson served in the Minnesota National Guard during the Mexican Border Conflict, World War I, and World War II, and was commissioned a brigadier general. He served as the Steele County Attorney from 1921 to 1934. Nelson, a Republican, served in the Minnesota Senate from 1955 to 1966. Nelson was buried in the Fort Snelling National Cemetery.
