= Harry Nelson (author) =

American author and healthcare lawyer

- Education: University of Michigan School of Law (AB, JD)
- Occupations: Healthcare lawyer; Author
- Notable work: From ObamaCare to TrumpCare: Why You Should Care (2017); The United States of Opioids: A Prescription for Liberating a Nation in Pain (2019)
- Website: harrynelson.com

Harry Nelson is an American author and healthcare lawyer. He is the founder of Nelson Hardiman.

Nelson specializes in regulatory and healthcare legislation. He is also the author of a notable book on opioids, The United States of Opioids: A Prescription for Liberating a Nation in Pain.

== Early life ==
Born into a Jewish family, Nelson received his education from the University of Michigan School of Law where he received an artium baccalaureus (AB) in 1990. In 1992, he received his JD from the University of Michigan School of Law.

He is also an alumnus of Wexner Graduate Fellowship.

== Career ==
Harry Nelson is the founder of Nelson Hardiman LLP which is based in Los Angeles, the United States. The firm is included in national and regional rankings published by the U.S. News & World Report.

In March 2018, he developed a certification program for addiction treatment facilities in conjunction with American Addiction Treatment Association.

In March 2019, he published his second book The United States of Opioids: A Prescription for Liberating a Nation in Pain. The book was reviewed by Kirkus Reviews. The foreword of the book was written by Lisa Marie Presley in which she talked about her addiction to opioids and drugs such as pain killers. Presley became addicted in 2008 and she explained ill-effects of drug abuse on her and her family.

He is also a member of the board of Project Opioid, based in Florida, the United States.

== Bibliography ==
- Fuller, Rob; Nelson, Harry (2017). From ObamaCare to TrumpCare: Why You Should Care
- Nelson, Harry (2019). The United States of Opioids: A Prescription for Liberating a Nation in Pain

== Awards and recognition ==
- The Best Lawyers in America for work in Health Care Law
- Best Lawyers in America (2010–2018)
- Southern California Super Lawyers (2010–2018)
- Martindale-Hubbell (2010–2018)
