= Stephen Darwall =

American philosopher (born 1946)

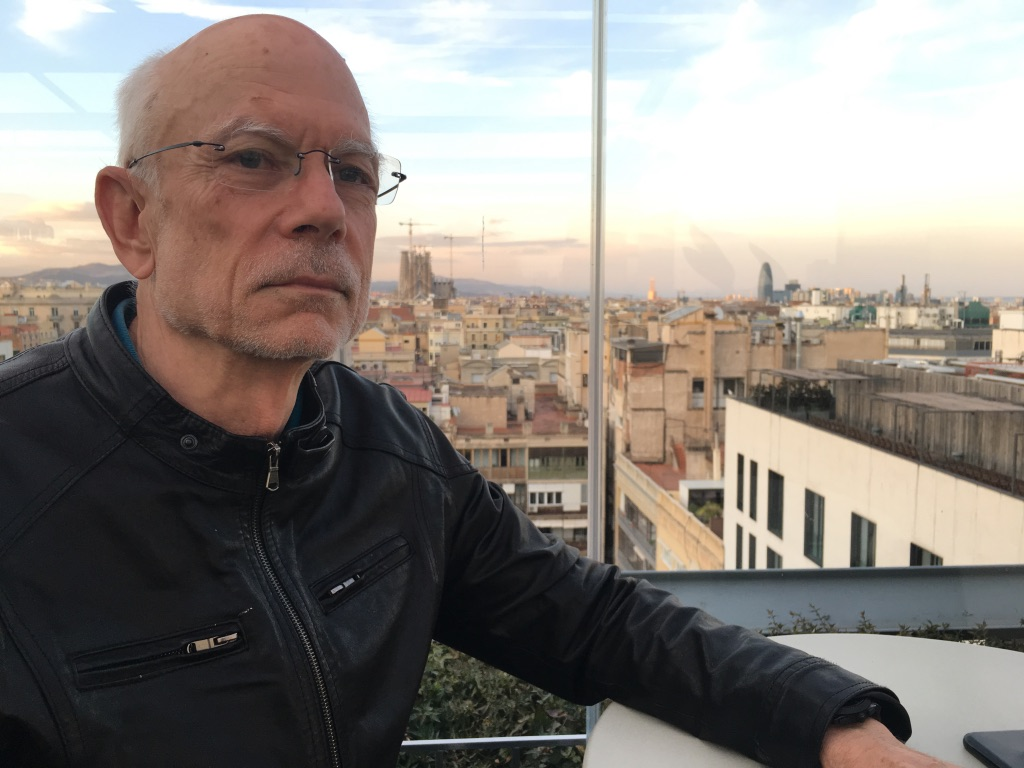
- Born: 1946 (age 79–80)

Education
- Education: Yale University (BA); University of Pittsburgh (PhD)
- Doctoral advisor: Kurt Baier

Philosophical work
- Era: Contemporary philosophy
- Region: Western philosophy
- School: Analytic
- Institutions: Yale University
- Main interests: Moral philosophy
- Notable ideas: Second-person standpoint in ethics

Stephen Darwall (/ˈdɑːrwɔːl/; born 1946) is an American moral philosopher, best known for his work developing Kantian and deontological themes. He was named Andrew Downey Orrick Professor of Philosophy at Yale University in 2008, where he had taught since 2006. He was named a Guggenheim Fellow in 2023.

== Education and career ==
A 1968 graduate of Yale University, he earned his PhD in philosophy at the University of Pittsburgh under Kurt Baier in 1972. He began his teaching career at the University of North Carolina, Chapel Hill in 1972, and then joined the Department of Philosophy at the University of Michigan philosophy department, where he became, in 2006, John Dewey Distinguished University Professor Emeritus and moved to Yale. He has been a fellow of the American Academy of Arts and Sciences since 2001 and was made a Guggenheim Fellow for philosophy in 2023. He and David Velleman are founding co-editors of Philosophers' Imprint. He specializes in the foundations and history of ethics.

== Work and research ==
He is known for his contributions to ethical theory and the history of ethics. His seminal work, The Second-Person Standpoint: Morality, Respect, and Accountability (2006), offers a perspective on the foundations of deontic morality, focusing on moral obligation, rights, and accountability. In this work, Darwall argues that the interpersonal nature of moral claims—what he terms the "second-person standpoint"—provides the basis for moral reasoning.

Darwall expanded on these ideas in two collections of essays, Morality, Authority, Law: Essays in Second-Personal Ethics I and Honor, History, and Relationship: Essays in Second-Personal Ethics II (2013).

In addition to his works on ethical theory, Darwall has worked on the history of ethics with publications like The British Moralists and the Internal ‘Ought’: 1640-1740 (1995) and Modern Moral Philosophy: From Grotius to Kant (2023), the first in a planned series tracing the development of moral philosophy through the twentieth century.

His book The Heart and Its Attitudes (2024) examines the role of second-personal attitudes in fostering personal relationships and emotional connections, building on his earlier work on mutual accountability and morality.

His other publications include Impartial Reason (1983), Philosophical Ethics (1998), and Welfare and Rational Care (2002), alongside seven edited anthologies, such as Moral Discourse and Practice (1997), co-edited with Allan Gibbard and Peter Railton.

== Selected works ==
- Impartial Reason (1983)
- The British Moralists and the Internal 'Ought': 1640–1740 (1995)
- Philosophical Ethics (1997)
- Welfare and Rational Care (2002)
- The Second-Person Standpoint: Morality, Respect, and Accountability (2006)
- Morality, Authority, and Law: Essays in Second-Personal Ethics I (2013)
- Honor, History, and Relationships: Essays in Second-Personal Ethics II (2013)
- Modern Moral Philosophy: From Grotius to Kant (2023).
