= Kantian ethics =

Ethical theory of Immanuel Kant

Kantian ethics refers to a deontological ethical theory developed by German philosopher Immanuel Kant that is based on the notion that "I ought never to act except in such a way that I could also will that my maxim should become a universal law." It is also associated with the idea that "it is impossible to think of anything at all in the world, or indeed even beyond it, that could be considered good without limitation except a good will." The theory was developed in the context of Enlightenment rationalism. It states that an action can only be moral if it is motivated by a sense of duty, and its maxim may be rationally willed a universal, objective law.

Central to Kant's theory of the moral law is the categorical imperative. Kant formulated the categorical imperative in various ways. His principle of universalizability requires that, for an action to be permissible, it must be possible to apply it to all people without a contradiction occurring. Kant's formulation of humanity, the second formulation of the categorical imperative, states that as an end in itself, humans are required never to treat others merely as a means to an end, but always as ends in themselves. The formulation of autonomy concludes that rational agents are bound to the moral law by their own will, while Kant's concept of the Kingdom of Ends requires that people act as if the principles of their actions establish a law for a hypothetical kingdom.

The tremendous influence of Kant's moral thought is evident both in the breadth of appropriations and criticisms it has inspired and in the many real world contexts in which it has found application.

== Outline ==
Although all of Kant's works develop his ethical theory, it is most clearly defined in the Groundwork of the Metaphysics of Morals, the Critique of Practical Reason, and the Metaphysics of Morals. While the Groundwork of the Metaphysics of Morals is important for understanding Kant's ethics, one will get an incomplete understanding of his moral thought if one only reads the Groundwork of the Metaphysics of Morals and the Critique of Practical Reason, or is not at least aware that his other ethical writings discuss other important details about Kant's moral philosophy as a whole since "one is all the more misled if he is not aware that they form only part of the picture."

As part of the Enlightenment tradition, Kant based his ethical theory on the belief that reason should be used to determine how people ought to act. He did not attempt to prescribe specific action, but instructed that reason should be used to determine how to behave.

=== Good will and duty ===
In his combined works, Kant construed as a basis for the ethical law by the concept of duty. Kant began his ethical theory by arguing that the only virtue that can be an unqualified good is a good will. No other virtue, or thing in the broadest sense of the term, has this status because every other virtue, every other thing, can be used to achieve immoral ends. For example, the virtue of loyalty is not good if one is loyal to an evil person. The good will is singularly unique in that it is always good and maintains its moral value regardless of whether or not it achieves its moral intentions. Kant regarded the good will as a single moral principle that freely chooses to use the other virtues for genuinely moral ends.

For Kant, a good will has a broader conception than a will that acts from duty. A will that acts from duty alone is distinguishable as a will that overcomes hindrances in order to keep the moral law. A dutiful will is thus a special case of a good will that becomes visible in adverse conditions. Kant argues that only such acts performed with regard to duty have moral worth. This is not to say that acts performed merely in accordance with duty are worthless (these still merit approval and encouragement), but that distinctively moral esteem is given to acts that are performed out of duty, or from duty, alone.

Kant's conception of duty does not entail that people perform their duties grudgingly. Although duty often constrains people and prompts them to act against their inclinations, it still comes from an agent's volition: they desire to keep the moral law from respect of the moral law. Thus, when an agent performs an action from duty it is because their moral incentives are chosen over and above any opposing inclinations. Kant wished to move beyond the conception of morality as externally imposed duties, and present an ethics of autonomy, when rational agents freely recognize the claims reason makes upon them.

==== Perfect and imperfect duties ====
Applying the categorical imperative, duties arise because failure to fulfill them would either result in a contradiction in conception or in a contradiction in the will. The former are classified as perfect duties, the latter as imperfect. A perfect duty always holds true. Kant eventually argues that there is in fact only one perfect duty—the categorical imperative. An imperfect duty allows flexibility—beneficence is an imperfect duty because we are not obliged to be completely beneficent at all times, but may choose the times and places in which we are. Kant believed that perfect duties are more important than imperfect duties: if a conflict between duties arises, the perfect duty must be followed.

=== Categorical imperative ===
The foundation of Kant's ethics is the categorical imperative, for which he provides four formulations. Kant made a distinction between categorical and hypothetical imperatives. A hypothetical imperative is one that people must obey if they want to satisfy our desires: 'go to the doctor' is a hypothetical imperative because they are only obliged to obey it if they want to get well. A categorical imperative binds them regardless of our desires: everyone has a duty to not lie, regardless of circumstances and even if it is in their interest to do so. These imperatives are morally binding because they are based on reason, rather than contingent facts about an agent. Unlike hypothetical imperatives, which bind them insofar as people are part of a group or society that they owe duties to, they cannot opt out of the categorical imperative because we cannot opt out of being rational agents. The categorical imperative makes people's duty to the moral law a requirement of reason which holds for them as rational agents; therefore, rational moral principles apply to all rational agents at all times.

==== Universalizability ====
Kant's first formulation of the categorical imperative is that of universalizability:

Act only in accordance with that maxim through which you can at the same time will that it become a universal law.

— Groundwork of the Metaphysics of Morals (1785)

Kant defines maxim as a "subjective principle of volition", which is distinguished from an "objective principle or 'practical law'". While "the latter is valid for every rational being and is a 'principle according to which they ought to act[,]' a maxim 'contains the practical rule which reason determines in accordance with the conditions of the subject (often their ignorance or inclinations) and is thus the principle according to which the subject does act.'" A maxim may be a practical law, yet regardless of whether or not that is so, it is always the principle that the person themself acts from.

Maxims lapse into mere subjectivity, and thus become unable to qualify as practical laws, if they produce a contradiction in conception or a contradiction in the will when universalized. A contradiction in conception happens when, if a maxim were to be universalized, it ceases to make coherent sense because the "maxim would necessarily destroy itself as soon as it was made a universal law." For example, if maxims equivalent to 'I will break a promise when doing so secures my advantage' were universalized, no one would trust any promises, so the idea of a promise would become meaningless; the maxim would be self-contradictory because, when universalized, promises cease to be meaningful. The maxim is not moral because it is logically impossible to universalize—we could not conceive of a world where this maxim was universalized.

A maxim can also be immoral if it creates a contradiction in the will when universalized. This does not mean it is logically impossible to universalize, but that doing so leads to a state of affairs that no rational being would desire.

Kant believed that morality is the objective law of reason: just as objective physical laws necessitate physical actions (e.g., apples fall down because of gravity), objective rational laws necessitate rational actions. He thus believed that a perfectly rational being must also be perfectly moral, because a perfectly rational being subjectively finds it necessary to do what is rationally necessary. Because humans are not perfectly rational (they partly act by instinct), Kant believed that humans must conform their subjective will with objective rational laws, which he called conformity obligation. Kant argued that the objective law of reason is a priori, existing externally from rational being. Just as physical laws exist prior to physical beings, rational laws (morality) exist prior to rational beings. Therefore, according to Kant, rational morality is universal and cannot change depending on circumstance.

Some have postulated a similarity between the first formulation of the categorical imperative and the Golden Rule. Kant himself criticized the Golden Rule as neither purely formal nor necessarily universally binding. His criticism can be seen in a footnote stating:

Let it not be thought that the trite quod tibi non vis fieri etc. [what you do not want others to do to you, etc.] can serve as norm of principle here. For it is, though with various limitations, only derived from the latter. It can be no universal law because it contains the ground neither of duties to oneself nor of duties of love to others (for many a man would gladly agree that others should not benefit him if only he might be excused from showing them beneficence), and finally it does not contain the ground of duties owed to others; for a criminal would argue on this ground against the judge punishing him, and so forth

==== Humanity as an end in itself ====
Kant's second formulation of the categorical imperative is to treat humanity as an end in itself:

So act that you use humanity, whether in your own person or in the person of any other, always at the same time as an end, never merely as a means.

— Groundwork of the Metaphysics of Morals (1785)

Kant argued that rational beings can never be treated merely as means to ends; they must always also be treated as ends in themselves, requiring that their own reasoned motives must be equally respected. This derives from Kant's claim that the sense of duty, the rational respect for law, motivates morality: it demands that we respect the rationality of all beings. A rational being cannot rationally consent to be used merely as a means to an end, so they must always be treated as an end. Kant justified this by arguing that moral obligation is a rational necessity: that which is rationally willed is morally right. Because all rational agents rationally will themselves to be an end and never merely a means, it is morally obligatory that they are treated as such. This does not mean that we can never treat a human as a means to an end, but that when we do, we also treat them as an end in themselves.

==== Formula of autonomy ====
Kant's formula of autonomy expresses the idea that an agent is obliged to follow the categorical imperative because of their rational will, rather than any outside influence. Kant believed that any moral law motivated by the desire to fulfill some other interest would deny the categorical imperative, leading him to argue that the moral law must only arise from a rational will. This principle requires people to recognize the right of others to act autonomously and means that, as moral laws must be universalizable, what is required of one person is required of all.

==== Kingdom of Ends ====
Another formulation of Kant's categorical imperative is the Kingdom of Ends:

A rational being belongs as a member to the kingdom of ends when he gives universal laws in it but is also himself subject to these laws. He belongs to it as sovereign when, as lawgiving, he is not subject to the will of any other.

A rational being must always regard himself as lawgiving in a kingdom of ends possible through freedom of the will, whether as a member or as sovereign.

— Groundwork of the Metaphysics of Morals (1785)

This formulation requires that actions be considered as if their maxim is to provide a law for a hypothetical Kingdom of Ends. Accordingly, people have an obligation to act upon principles that a community of rational agents would accept as laws. In such a community, each individual would only accept maxims that can govern every member of the community without treating any member merely as a means to an end. Although the Kingdom of Ends is an ideal—the actions of other people and events of nature ensure that actions with good intentions sometimes result in harm—we are still required to act categorically, as legislators of this ideal kingdom.

=== The Metaphysics of Morals ===
As Kant explains in the Groundwork of the Metaphysics of Morals (and as its title directly indicates), that short 1785 text is "nothing more than the search for and establishment of the supreme principle of morality." Kant further states,

just because moral laws are to hold for every rational being as such, to derive them from the universal concept of a rational being as such, and in this way to set forth completely the whole of morals, [a metaphysics of morals] needs anthropology for its application to human beings.

His promised Metaphysics of Morals, however, was much delayed and did not appear until its two parts, The Doctrine of Right and The Doctrine of Virtue, were published separately in 1797 and 1798. In the twelve years between the Groundwork and The Doctrine of Right, Kant decided that the metaphysics of morals and its application should, after all, be integrated (though still as distinct from practical anthropology). The distinction between its groundwork (or foundation) and the metaphysics of morals itself, however, continues to apply. Moreover, the account provided in the latter Metaphysics of Morals provides "a very different account of ordinary moral reasoning" than the one suggested by the Groundwork.

The Doctrine of Right deals with juridical duties, which are "concerned only with protecting the external freedom of individuals" and indifferent to incentives. (Although we do have a moral duty "to limit ourselves to actions that are right, that duty is not part of [right] itself.") Its basic political idea is that "each person’s entitlement to be his or her own master is only consistent with the entitlements of others if public legal institutions are in place."

The Doctrine of Virtue is concerned with duties of virtue or "ends that are at the same time duties." It is here, in the domain of ethics, that The Metaphysics of Morals's greatest innovation is to be found. According to Kant's account, "ordinary moral reasoning is fundamentally teleological—it is reasoning about what ends we are constrained by morality to pursue, and the priorities among these ends we are required to observe." More specifically,

There are two sorts of ends that it is our duty to have: our own perfection and the happiness of others (MS 6:385). "Perfection" includes both our natural perfection (the development of our talents, skills, and capacities of understanding) and moral perfection (our virtuous disposition) (MS 6:387). A person’s "happiness" is the greatest rational whole of the ends the person set for the sake of her own satisfaction (MS 6:387–8).

Kant's elaboration of this teleological doctrine offers up a very different moral theory than the one typically attributed to him on the basis of his foundational works alone.

== Influences on Kantian ethics ==
Biographer of Kant, Manfred Kuhn, suggested that the values Kant's parents held, of "hard work, honesty, cleanliness, and independence", set him an example and influenced him more than their pietism did. In the Stanford Encyclopedia of Philosophy, Michael Rohlf suggests that Kant was influenced by his teacher, Martin Knutzen, himself influenced by the work of Christian Wolff and John Locke, and who introduced Kant to the work of English physicist Isaac Newton. Eric Entrican Wilson and Lara Denis emphasize David Hume's influence on Kant's ethics. Both of them try to reconcile freedom with a commitment to causal determinism and believe that morality’s foundation is independent of religion.

Louis Pojman has suggested four strong influences on Kant's ethics:

1. Lutheran Pietism, to which Kant's parents subscribed, emphasised honesty and moral living over doctrinal belief, more concerned with feeling than rationality. Kant believed that rationality is required, but that it should be concerned with morality and good will. Kant's description of moral progress as the turning of inclinations towards the fulfilment of duty has been described as a version of the Lutheran doctrine of sanctification.
2. Political philosopher Jean-Jacques Rousseau, whose Social Contract influenced Kant's view on the fundamental worth of human beings. Pojman also cites contemporary ethical debates as influential to the development of Kant's ethics. Kant favoured rationalism over empiricism, which meant he viewed morality as a form of knowledge, rather than something based on human desire.
3. Natural law, the belief that the moral law is determined by nature.
4. Intuitionism, the belief that humans have intuitive awareness of objective moral truths.

== Influenced by Kantian ethics ==
=== Jürgen Habermas ===
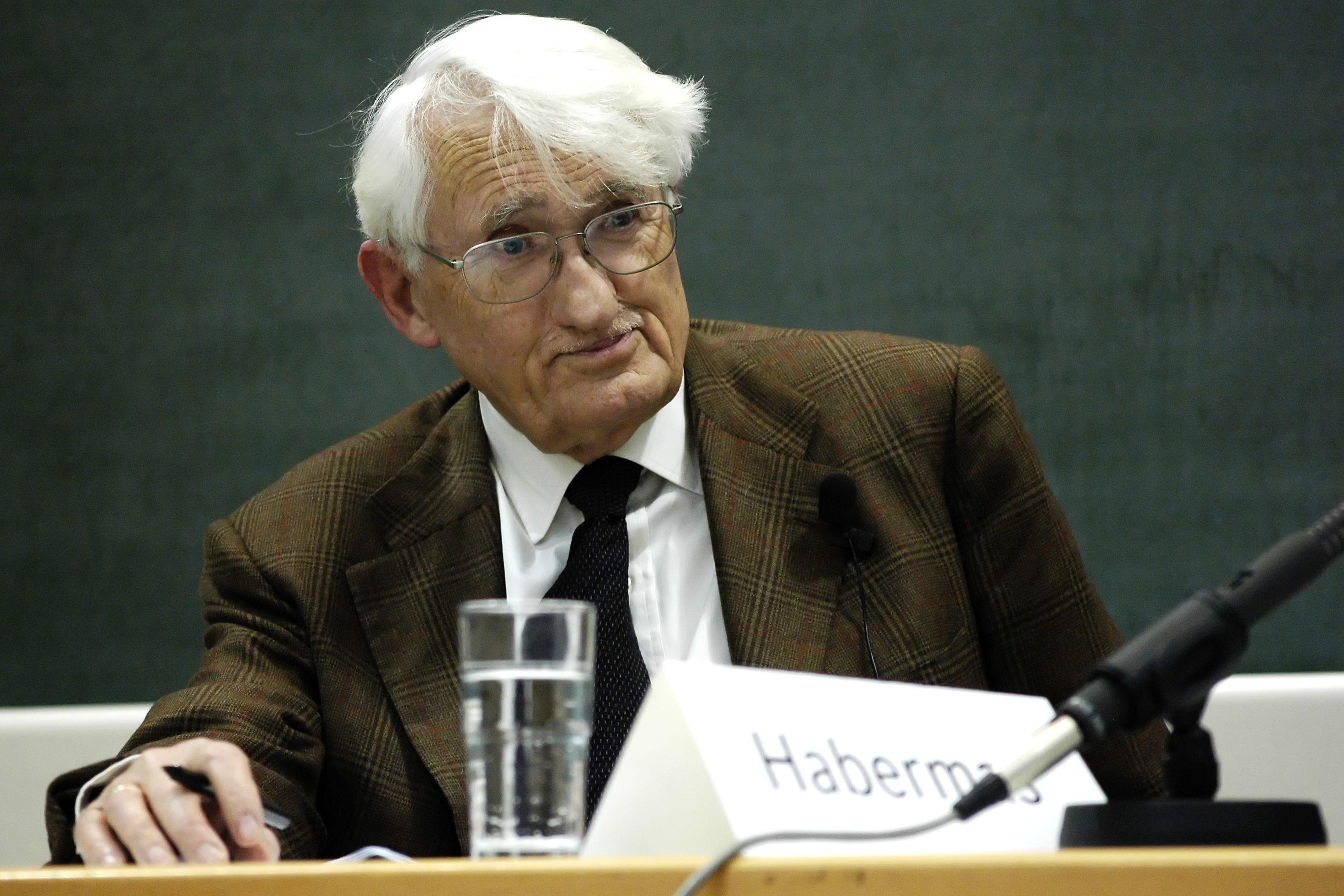
Photograph of Jürgen Habermas, whose theory of discourse ethics was influenced by Kantian ethics

German philosopher Jürgen Habermas proposed a theory of discourse ethics that he claimed was a descendant of Kantian ethics. He proposed that action should be based on communication between those involved, in which their interests and intentions are discussed so they can be understood by all. Rejecting any form of coercion or manipulation, Habermas believed that agreement between the parties is crucial for a moral decision to be reached. Like Kantian ethics, discourse ethics is a cognitive ethical theory, in that it supposes that truth and falsity can be attributed to ethical propositions. It also formulates a rule by which ethical actions can be determined and proposes that ethical actions should be universalizable, in a similar way to Kant's ethics.

Habermas argued that his ethical theory was an improvement on Kant's, and rejects the dualistic framework of Kant's ethics. Kant distinguished between the phenomena world, which can be sensed and experienced by humans, and the noumena, or the world of the things-in-themselves, which is inaccessible to humans. This dichotomy was necessary for Kant because it could explain the autonomy of a human agent: although a human is bound in the phenomenal world, their actions are free in the intelligible world. For Habermas, morality arises from discourse, which is made necessary by their rationality and needs, rather than their freedom.

=== John Rawls ===
The social contract theory of political philosopher John Rawls, developed in his work A Theory of Justice, was influenced by Kant's ethics. Rawls argued that a just society would be fair. To achieve this fairness, he proposed a hypothetical moment prior to the existence of a society, at which the society is ordered: this is the original position. This should take place from behind a veil of ignorance, where no one knows what their own position in society will be, preventing people from being biased by their own interests and ensuring a fair result. Rawls' theory of justice rests on the belief that individuals are free, equal, and moral; he regarded all human beings as possessing some degree of reasonableness and rationality, which he saw as the constituents of morality and entitling their possessors to equal justice. Rawls dismissed much of Kant's dualisms, arguing that the structure of Kantian ethics, once reformulated, is clearer without them—he described this as one of the goals of A Theory of Justice.

=== Thomas Nagel ===
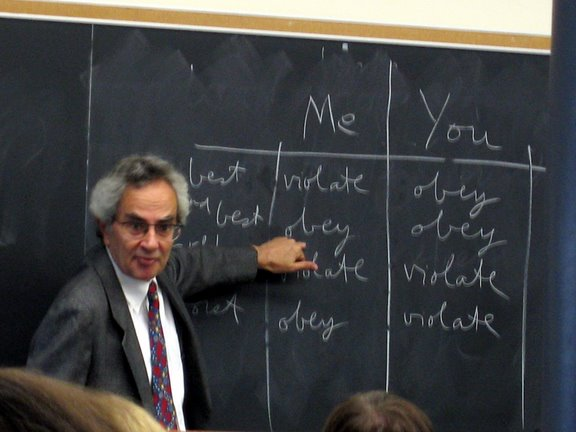
Nagel in 2008, teaching ethics

Thomas Nagel has been highly influential in the related fields of moral and political philosophy. Supervised by John Rawls, Nagel has been a long-standing proponent of a Kantian and rationalist approach to moral philosophy. His distinctive ideas were first presented in the short monograph The Possibility of Altruism, published in 1970. That book seeks by reflection on the nature of practical reasoning to uncover the formal principles that underlie reason in practice and the related general beliefs about the self that are necessary for those principles to be truly applicable to us.

Nagel defends motivated desire theory about the motivation of moral action. According to motivated desire theory, when a person is motivated to moral action it is indeed true that such actions are motivated—like all intentional actions—by a belief and a desire. But it is important to get the justificatory relations right: when a person accepts a moral judgment he or she is necessarily motivated to act. But it is the reason that does the justificatory work of justifying both the action and the desire. Nagel contrasts this view with a rival view which believes that a moral agent can only accept that he or she has a reason to act if the desire to carry out the action has an independent justification. An account based on presupposing sympathy would be of this kind.

There is a very close parallel between prudential reasoning in one's own interests and moral reasons to act to further the interests of another person. When one reasons prudentially, for example about the future reasons that one will have, one allows the reason in the future to justify one's current action without reference to the strength of one's current desires. If a hurricane were to destroy someone's car next year at that point he will want his insurance company to pay him to replace it: that future reason gives him a reason, now, to take out insurance. The strength of the reason ought not to be hostage to the strength of one's current desires. The denial of this view of prudence, Nagel argues, means that one does not really believe that one is one and the same person through time. One is dissolving oneself into distinct person-stages.

=== Lewis White Beck ===
Within the framework of his extensive editorial commentaries on the works of Kant, Lewis White Beck strove to illustrate the manner in which Kantian ethics might prove relevant to several of the moral dilemmas which confronted mankind in the mid 20th century. In his Six Secular Philosophers (1966) Beck argued than a modern secular philosophy which accommodates religious thoughts and values can be successfully formulated through an appeal to mankind's freedom of thought. With this in mind, he illustrated the central role which Kantian ethics might assume within such a formulation. He specifically identifies two "families" of philosophers whose works might be considered relevant to the evolution of such a modern secular philosophy.

In one such family, Beck calls our attention to philosophers who utilized an appeal to mankind's scientific and philosophical endeavors in order to impose various limits upon the scope, validity and content of religious beliefs. Beck included the works of Baruch Spinoza, David Hume and Immanuel Kant within this family. In Beck's view, Kantian ethics paved the way toward a more comprehensive modern secular philosophical paradigm in several ways. By specifically rejecting Spinoza's appeal to a strict monism, Kant parted ways with Spinoza's reliance upon a deity to assume a central role in modern ethical theory. Beck argued further that Kant's ethical theories are in agreement with Hume's assertion that scientific interpretations of nature cannot by themselves serve to confirm religious belief. Yet, as Beck quickly reminds his readers, Kant also distanced himself from Hume by insisting that mankind is not consequently left entirely adrift without a moral compass. According to Beck's reading, Kant clearly asserts that mankind should regard moral law "as if" it were a divine command which unites people "as if" they were in common allegiance to such a "supposed" deity. This is accomplished through Kant's appeal to a different rational basis for religious thoughts and values which can be found in mankind's moral consciousness.

=== Contemporary Kantian ethicists ===
==== Onora O'Neill ====
Philosopher Onora O'Neill, who studied under John Rawls at Harvard University, is a contemporary Kantian ethicist who supports a Kantian approach to issues of social justice. O'Neill argues that a successful Kantian account of social justice must not rely on any unwarranted idealizations or assumption. She notes that philosophers have previously charged Kant with idealizing humans as autonomous beings, without any social context or life goals, though maintains that Kant's ethics can be read without such an idealization. O'Neill prefers Kant's conception of reason as practical and available to be used by humans, rather than as principles attached to every human being. Conceiving of reason as a tool to make decisions with means that the only thing able to restrain the principles we adopt is that they could be adopted by all. If we cannot will that everyone adopts a certain principle, then we cannot give them reasons to adopt it. To use reason, and to reason with other people, we must reject those principles that cannot be universally adopted. In this way, O'Neill reached Kant's formulation of universalisability without adopting an idealistic view of human autonomy. This model of universalisability does not require that we adopt all universalisable principles, but merely prohibits us from adopting those that are not.

From this model of Kantian ethics, O'Neill begins to develop a theory of justice. She argues that the rejection of certain principles, such as deception and coercion, provides a starting point for basic conceptions of justice, which she argues are more determinate for human beings that the more abstract principles of equality or liberty. Nevertheless, she concedes that these principles may seem to be excessively demanding: there are many actions and institutions that do rely on non-universalisable principles, such as injury.

==== Marcia Baron ====
In his paper "The Schizophrenia of Modern Ethical Theories", philosopher Michael Stocker challenges Kantian ethics (and all modern ethical theories) by arguing that actions from duty lack certain moral value. He gives the example of Smith, who visits his friend in hospital out of duty, rather than because of the friendship; he argues that this visit seems morally lacking because it is motivated by the wrong thing.

Marcia Baron has attempted to defend Kantian ethics on this point. After presenting a number of reasons that we might find acting out of duty objectionable, she argues that these problems only arise when people misconstrue what their duty is. Acting out of duty is not intrinsically wrong, but immoral consequences can occur when people misunderstand what they are duty-bound to do. Duty need not be seen as cold and impersonal: one may have a duty to cultivate their character or improve their personal relationships. Baron further argues that duty should be construed as a secondary motive—that is, a motive that regulates and sets conditions on what may be done, rather than prompt specific actions. She argues that, seen this way, duty neither reveals a deficiency in one's natural inclinations to act, nor undermines the motives and feelings that are essential to friendship. For Baron, being governed by duty does not mean that duty is always the primary motivation to act; rather, it entails that considerations of duty are always action-guiding. A responsible moral agent should take an interest in moral questions, such as questions of character. These should guide moral agents to act from duty.

==== Christine Korsgaard ====
In her 1981 doctoral dissertation The Standpoint of Practical Reason, philosopher Christine Korsgaard argues that there are four basic types of interpretation of the formula of universal law:

1. The theoretical contradiction interpretation: there is a logical or physical impossibility in universalizing the maxim.
2. The terrible consequences interpretation: universalizing the maxim would cause terrible consequences.
3. The teleological contradiction interpretation: the universalized maxim could not be willed as a teleological law of nature.
4. The practical contradiction interpretation: were the maxim to be universalized, the agent would be unable to achieve the purpose in their maxim.

Korsgaard argues that the practical contradiction interpretation is the correct interpretation. She further argues that there are two ways a maxim may violate the formula of universal law:

1. The first contradiction test: A maxim fails the first contradiction test if it cannot even be universalized without a contradiction.
2. The second contradiction test: A maxim fails the second contradiction test if it can be universalized, but it cannot be willed without a contradiction.

== Criticisms of Kantian ethics ==
=== Friedrich Schiller ===
While Friedrich Schiller appreciated Kant for basing the source of morality on a person's reason rather than on God, he also criticized Kant for not going far enough in the conception of autonomy, as the internal constraint of reason would also take away a person's autonomy by going against their sensuous self. Schiller introduced the concept of the "beautiful soul", in which the rational and non-rational elements within a person are in such harmony that a person can be led entirely by their sensibility and inclinations. "Grace" is the expression in appearance of this harmony. However, given that humans are not naturally virtuous, it is in exercising control over the inclinations and impulses through moral strength that a person displays "dignity". Schiller's main implied criticism of Kant is that the latter only saw dignity while grace is ignored.

Kant responded to Schiller in a footnote that appears in Religion within the Bounds of Bare Reason. While he admits that the concept of duty can only be associated with dignity, gracefulness is also allowed by the virtuous individual as he attempts to meet the demands of the moral life courageously and joyously.

=== G. W. F. Hegel ===
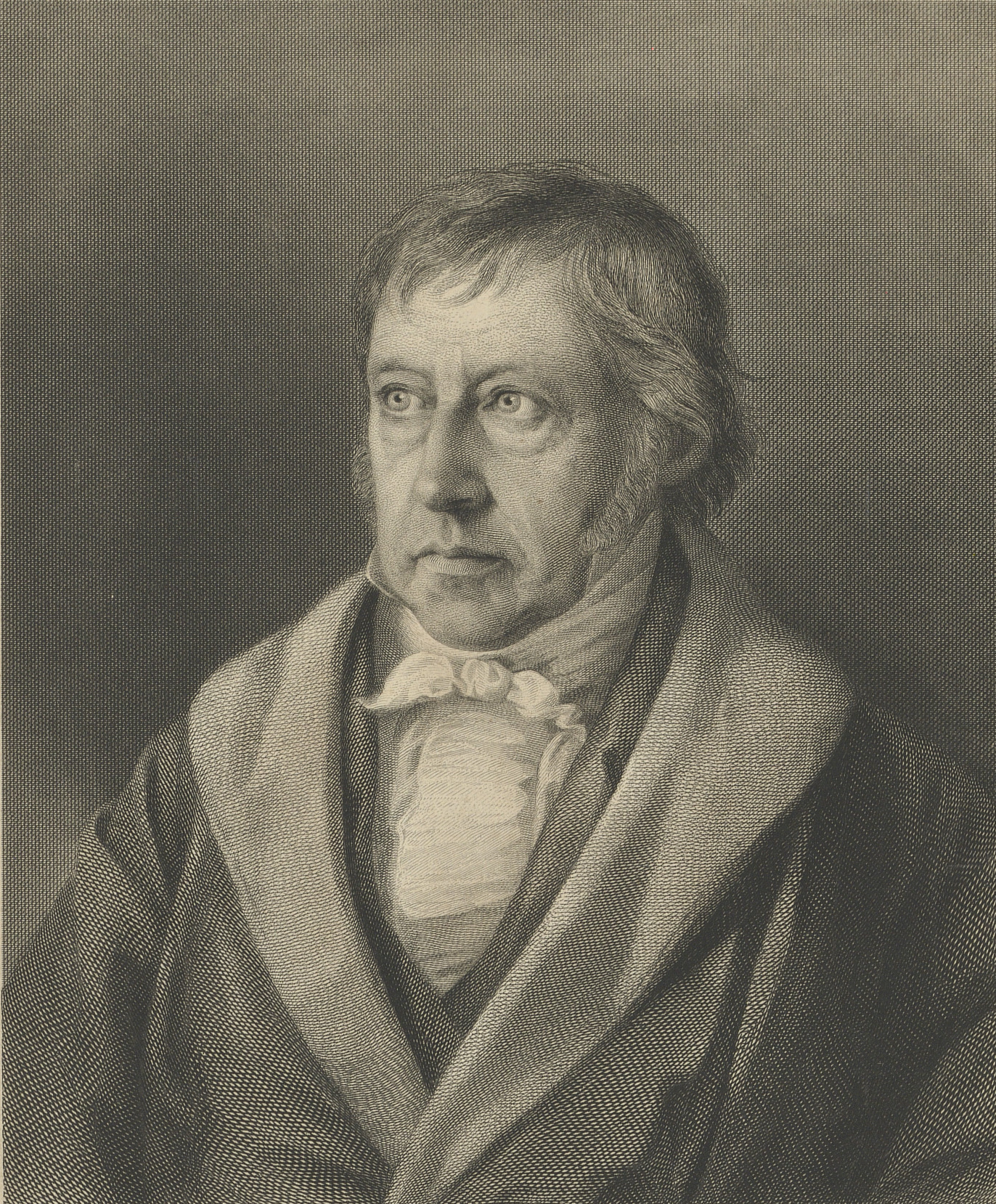
Portrait of G. W. F. Hegel

German philosopher G. W. F. Hegel presented two main criticisms of Kantian ethics. He first argued that Kantian ethics provides no specific information about what people should do because Kant's moral law is solely a principle of non-contradiction. He argued that Kant's ethics lack any content and so cannot constitute a supreme principle of morality. To illustrate this point, Hegel and his followers have presented a number of cases in which the Formula of Universal Law either provides no meaningful answer or gives an obviously wrong answer. Hegel used Kant's example of being trusted with another man's money to argue that Kant's Formula of Universal Law cannot determine whether a social system of property is a morally good thing, because either answer can entail contradictions. He also used the example of helping the poor: if everyone helped the poor, there would be no poor left to help, so beneficence would be impossible if universalized, making it immoral according to Kant's model. Hegel's second criticism was that Kant's ethics forces humans into an internal conflict between reason and desire. Because it does not address the tension between self-interest and morality, Kant's ethics cannot give individuals any reason to be moral.

=== Arthur Schopenhauer ===
German philosopher Arthur Schopenhauer criticised Kant's belief that ethics should concern what ought to be done, insisting that the scope of ethics should be to attempt to explain and interpret what actually happens. Whereas Kant presented an idealized version of what ought to be done in a perfect world, Schopenhauer argued that ethics should instead be practical and arrive at conclusions that could work in the real world, capable of being presented as a solution to the world's problems. Schopenhauer drew a parallel with aesthetics, arguing that in both cases prescriptive rules are not the most important part of the discipline. Because he believed that virtue cannot be taught—a person is either virtuous or is not—he cast the proper place of morality as restraining and guiding people's behavior, rather than presenting unattainable universal laws.

=== Friedrich Nietzsche ===
Philosopher Friedrich Nietzsche criticised all contemporary moral systems, with a special focus on Christian and Kantian ethics. He argued that all modern ethical systems share two problematic characteristics: first, they make a metaphysical claim about the nature of humanity, which must be accepted for the system to have any normative force; and second, the system benefits the interests of certain people, often over those of others. Although Nietzsche's primary objection is not that metaphysical claims about humanity are untenable (he also objected to ethical theories that do not make such claims), his two main targets—Kantianism and Christianity—do make metaphysical claims, which therefore feature prominently in Nietzsche's criticism.

Nietzsche rejected fundamental components of Kant's ethics, particularly his argument that morality, God, and immorality, can be shown through reason. Nietzsche cast suspicion on the use of moral intuition, which Kant used as the foundation of his morality, arguing that it has no normative force in ethics. He further attempted to undermine key concepts in Kant's moral psychology, such as the will and pure reason. Like Kant, Nietzsche developed a concept of autonomy; however, he rejected Kant's idea that valuing our own autonomy requires us to respect the autonomy of others. A naturalist reading of Nietzsche's moral psychology stands contrary to Kant's conception of reason and desire. Under the Kantian model, reason is a fundamentally different motive to desire because it has the capacity to stand back from a situation and make an independent decision. Nietzsche conceives of the self as a social structure of all our different drives and motivations; thus, when it seems that our intellect has made a decision against our drives, it is actually just an alternative drive taking dominance over another. This is in direct contrast with Kant's view of the intellect as opposed to instinct; instead, it is just another instinct. There is thus no self capable of standing back and making a decision; the decision the self makes is simply determined by the strongest drive. Kantian commentators have argued that Nietzsche's practical philosophy requires the existence of a self capable of standing back in the Kantian sense. For an individual to create values of their own, which is a key idea in Nietzsche's philosophy, they must be able to conceive of themselves as a unified agent. Even if the agent is influenced by their drives, he must regard them as his own, which undermines Nietzsche's conception of autonomy.

Nietzsche criticizes Kant even in his autobiography Ecce Homo: "Leibniz and Kant - these two great breaks upon the intellectual honesty of Europe!" Nietzsche argues that virtues should be personally crafted to serve our own needs and protect ourselves. He warns against adopting virtues based solely on abstract notions of "virtue" itself, as advocated by Kant, as they can be harmful to our lives, in his quote:

A virtue must be our invention; it must spring out of our personal need and defence. In every other case it is a source of danger. That which does not belong to our life menaces it; a virtue which has its roots in mere respect for the concept of “virtue,” as Kant would have it, is pernicious.

=== John Stuart Mill ===
The Utilitarian philosopher John Stuart Mill criticizes Kant for not realizing that moral laws are justified by a moral intuition based on utilitarian principles (that the greatest good for the greatest number ought to be sought). Mill argued that Kant's ethics could not explain why certain actions are wrong without appealing to utilitarianism. As basis for morality, Mill believed that his principle of utility has a stronger intuitive grounding than Kant's reliance on reason, and can better explain why certain actions are right or wrong.

=== Virtue ethics ===
Virtue ethics is a form of ethical theory which emphasizes the character of an agent, rather than specific acts; many of its proponents have criticised Kant's deontological approach to ethics. Elizabeth Anscombe criticised modern ethical theories, including Kantian ethics, for their obsession with law and obligation. As well as arguing that theories which rely on a universal moral law are too rigid, Anscombe suggested that, because a moral law implies a moral lawgiver, they are irrelevant in modern secular society.

In his work After Virtue, Alasdair MacIntyre criticises Kant's formulation of universalisability, arguing that various trivial and immoral maxims can pass the test, such as "Keep all your promises throughout your entire life except one." He further challenges Kant's formulation of humanity as an end in itself by arguing that Kant provided no reason to treat others as means: the maxim "Let everyone except me be treated as a means", though seemingly immoral, can be universalized. Bernard Williams argues that, by abstracting persons from character, Kant misrepresents persons and morality and Philippa Foot identified Kant as one of a select group of philosophers responsible for the neglect of virtue by analytic philosophy.

Roman Catholic priest Servais Pinckaers regarded Christian ethics as closer to the virtue ethics of Aristotle than Kant's ethics. He presented virtue ethics as freedom for excellence, which regards freedom as acting in accordance with nature to develop one's virtues.

=== Autonomy ===
A number of philosophers (including Elizabeth Anscombe, Jean Bethke Elshtain, Servais Pinckaers, Iris Murdoch, and Kevin Knight) have all suggested that the Kantian conception of ethics rooted in autonomy is contradictory in its dual contention that humans are co-legislators of morality and that morality is a priori. They argue that if something is universally a priori (i.e., existing unchangingly prior to experience), then it cannot also be in part dependent upon humans, who have not always existed. On the other hand, if humans truly do legislate morality, then they are not bound by it objectively, because they are always free to change it.

This objection seems to rest on a misunderstanding of Kant's views since Kant argued that morality is dependent upon the concept of a rational will (and the related concept of a categorical imperative: an imperative which any rational being must necessarily will for itself). It is not based on contingent features of any being's will, nor upon human wills in particular, so there is no sense in which Kant makes ethics "dependent" upon anything which has not always existed. Furthermore, the sense in which our wills are subject to the law is precisely that if our wills are rational, we must will in a lawlike fashion; that is, we must will according to moral judgments we apply to all rational beings, including ourselves.

This is more easily understood by parsing the term "autonomy" into its Greek roots: auto (self) + nomos (rule or law). That is, an autonomous will, according to Kant, is not merely one which follows its own will, but whose will is lawful—that is, conforming to the principle of universalizability, which Kant also identifies with reason. Ironically, in another passage, willing according to immutable reason is precisely the kind of capacity Elshtain ascribes to God as the basis of his moral authority, and she commands this over an inferior voluntarist version of divine command theory, which would make both morality and God's will contingent. As O'Neill argues, Kant's theory is a version of the first rather than the second view of autonomy, so neither God nor any human authority, including contingent human institutions, play any unique authoritative role in his moral theory. Kant and Elshtain, that is, both agree God has no choice but to conform his will to the immutable facts of reason, including moral truths; humans do have such a choice, but otherwise their relationship to morality is the same as that of God's: they can recognize moral facts, but do not determine their content through contingent acts of will.

== Applications ==
=== Medical ethics ===
Kant believed that the shared ability of humans to reason should be the basis of morality, and that it is the ability to reason that makes humans morally significant. He, therefore, believed that all humans should have the right to common dignity and respect. Margaret L. Eaton argues that, according to Kant's ethics, a medical professional must be happy for their own practices to be used by and on anyone, even if they were the patient themselves. For example, a researcher who wished to perform tests on patients without their knowledge must be happy for all researchers to do so. She also argues that Kant's requirement of autonomy would mean that a patient must be able to make a fully informed decision about treatment, making it immoral to perform tests on unknowing patients. Medical research should be motivated out of respect for the patient, so they must be informed of all facts, even if this would be likely to dissuade the patient.

Jeremy Sugarman has argued that Kant's formulation of autonomy requires that patients are never used merely for the benefit of society, but are always treated as rational people with their own goals. Aaron E. Hinkley notes that a Kantian account of autonomy requires respect for choices that are arrived at rationally, not for choices which are arrived at by idiosyncratic or non-rational means. He argues that there may be some difference between what a purely rational agent would choose and what a patient actually chooses, the difference being the result of non-rational idiosyncrasies. Although a Kantian physician ought not to lie to or coerce a patient, Hinkley suggests that some form of paternalism—such as through withholding information which may prompt a non-rational response—could be acceptable.

==== Abortion ====
In How Kantian Ethics Should Treat Pregnancy and Abortion, Susan Feldman argues that abortion should be defended according to Kantian ethics. She proposes that a woman should be treated as a dignified autonomous person, with control over their body, as Kant suggested. She believes that the free choice of women would be paramount in Kantian ethics, requiring abortion to be the mother's decision.

Dean Harris has noted that, if Kantian ethics is to be used in the discussion of abortion, it must be decided whether a fetus is an autonomous person. Kantian ethicist Carl Cohen argues that the potential to be rational or participation in a generally rational species is the relevant distinction between humans and inanimate objects or irrational animals. Cohen believes that even when humans are not rational because of age (such as babies or fetuses) or mental disability, agents are still morally obligated to treat them as an ends in themselves, equivalent to a rational adult such as a mother seeking an abortion.

=== Sexual ethics ===
Kant viewed humans as being subject to the animalistic desires of self-preservation, species-preservation, and the preservation of enjoyment. He argued that humans have a duty to avoid maxims that harm or degrade themselves, including suicide, sexual degradation, and drunkenness. This led Kant to regard sexual intercourse as degrading because it reduces humans to an object of pleasure. He admitted sex only within marriage, which he regarded as "a merely animal union". He believed that masturbation is worse than suicide, reducing a person's status to below that of an animal; he argued that rape should be punished with castration and that bestiality requires expulsion from society.

==== Commercial sex ====
Feminist philosopher Catharine MacKinnon has argued that many contemporary practices would be deemed immoral by Kant's standards because they dehumanize women. Sexual harassment, prostitution, and pornography, she argues, objectify women and do not meet Kant's standard of human autonomy. Commercial sex has been criticised for turning both parties into objects (and thus using them as a means to an end); mutual consent is problematic because in consenting, people choose to objectify themselves. Alan Soble has noted that more liberal Kantian ethicists believe that, depending on other contextual factors, the consent of women can vindicate their participation in pornography and prostitution.

=== Animal ethics ===
Because Kant viewed rationality as the basis for being a moral patient—one due moral consideration—he believed that animals have no moral rights. Animals, according to Kant, are not rational, thus one cannot behave immorally towards them. Although he did not believe we have any duties towards animals, Kant did believe being cruel to them was wrong because our behaviour might influence our attitudes toward human beings: if we become accustomed to harming animals, then we are more likely to see harming humans as acceptable.

Ethicist Tom Regan rejected Kant's assessment of the moral worth of animals on three main points: First, he rejected Kant's claim that animals are not self-conscious. He then challenged Kant's claim that animals have no intrinsic moral worth because they cannot make a moral judgment. Regan argued that, if a being's moral worth is determined by its ability to make a moral judgment, then we must regard humans who are incapable of moral thought as being equally undue moral consideration. Regan finally argued that Kant's assertion that animals exist merely as a means to an end is unsupported; the fact that animals have a life that can go well or badly suggests that, like humans, they have their own ends.

Christine Korsgaard has reinterpreted Kantian theory to argue that animal rights are implied by his moral principles.

=== Lying ===
Kant believed that the categorical imperative provides us with the maxim that we ought not to lie in any circumstances, even if we are trying to bring about good consequences, such as lying to a murderer to prevent them from finding their intended victim. Kant argued that, because we cannot fully know what the consequences of any action will be, the result might be unexpectedly harmful. Therefore, we ought to act to avoid the known wrong—lying—rather than to avoid a potential wrong. If there are harmful consequences, we are blameless because we acted according to our duty. Julia Driver argues that this might not be a problem if we choose to formulate our maxims differently: the maxim 'I will lie to save an innocent life' can be universalized. However, this new maxim may still treat the murderer as a means to an end, which we have a duty to avoid doing. Thus we may still be required to tell the truth to the murderer in Kant's example.

== See also ==
- History of ethical idealism

== Bibliography ==
- Anscombe, G. E. M. (1958). "Modern Moral Philosophy". Philosophy. 33 (124): 1–19. doi:10.1017/S0031819100037943. ISSN 0031-8191. JSTOR 3749051. S2CID 197875941.
- Athanassoulis, Nafsika (7 July 2010). "Virtue Ethics". Internet Encyclopedia of Philosophy.
- Atwell, John (1986). Ends and principles in Kant's moral thought. Springer. ISBN 978-90-247-3167-1.
- Axinn, Sidney; Kneller, Jane (1998). Autonomy and Community: Readings in Contemporary Kantian Social Philosophy. SUNY Press. ISBN 978-0-7914-3743-8.
- Baron, Marcia (1999). Kantian Ethics Almost Without Apology. Cornell University Press. ISBN 978-0-8014-8604-3.
- Benn, Piers (1998). Ethics. UCL Press. ISBN 1-85728-453-4.
- Blackburn, Simon (2008). "Morality". Oxford Dictionary of Philosophy (Second edition revised ed.).
- Brinton, Crane (1967). "Enlightenment". Encyclopedia of Philosophy. Vol. 2. Macmillan.
- Brooks, Thom (2012). Hegel's Philosophy of Right. John Wiley & Sons. ISBN 978-1-4051-8813-5.
- Brooks, Thom; Freyenhagen, Fabian (2005). The Legacy of John Rawls. Continuum International Publishing Group. ISBN 978-0-8264-7843-6.
- Cohen, Carl (1986). "The Case For the Use of Animals in Biomedical Research". New England Journal of Medicine. 315 (14): 865–69. doi:10.1056/NEJM198610023151405. PMID 3748104. S2CID 20009545.
- Beenfeldt, Christian (2007). Collin, Finn (ed.). "Ungrounded Semantics: Searle's Chinese Room Thought Experiment, the Failure of Meta and Subsystemic Understanding, and Some Thoughts about Thought-Experiments". Danish Yearbook of Philosophy. 42. Museum Tusculanum Press: 75–96. doi:10.1163/24689300_0420104. ISSN 0070-2749.
- Denis, Lara (April 1999). "Kant on the Wrongness of "Unnatural" Sex". History of Philosophy Quarterly. 16 (2). University of Illinois Press: 225–248.
- Driver, Julia (2007). Ethics: The Fundamentals. Blackwell. ISBN 978-1-4051-1154-6.
- Eaton, Margaret (2004). Ethics and the Business of Bioscience. Stanford University Press. ISBN 978-0-8047-4250-4.
- Ellis, Ralph D. (1998). Just Results: Ethical Foundations for Policy Analysis. Georgetown University Press. ISBN 978-0-87840-667-8.
- Elshtain, Jean Bethke (2008). Sovereignty: God, State, and Self. Basic Books. ISBN 978-0-465-03759-9.
- Engelhardt, Hugo Tristram (2011). Bioethics Critically Reconsidered: Having Second Thoughts. Springer. ISBN 978-94-007-2244-6.
- Freeman, Samuel (2019). "Original Position". Stanford Encyclopedia of Philosophy.
- Guyer, Paul (2011). "Chapter 8: Kantian Perfectionism". In Jost, Lawrence; Wuerth, Julian (eds.). Perfecting Virtue: New Essays on Kantian Ethics and Virtue Ethics. Cambridge University Press. ISBN 978-1-139-49435-9.
- Hare, John (2011). "Kant, The Passions, And The Structure Of Moral Motivation". Faith and Philosophy: Journal of the Society of Christian Philosophers. 28 (1): 54–70. doi:10.5840/faithphil201128116.
- Harris, Dean (2011). Ethics in Health Services and Policy: A Global Approach. John Wiley & Sons. ISBN 978-0-470-53106-8.
- Hill, Thomas (2009). The Blackwell Guide to Kant's Ethics. John Wiley & Sons. ISBN 978-1-4051-2581-9.
- Hirst, E. W. (1934). "The Categorical Imperative and the Golden Rule". Philosophy. 9 (35): 328–335. doi:10.1017/S0031819100029442. ISSN 0031-8191. JSTOR 3746418. S2CID 170983087.
- Janaway, Christopher (2002). Schopenhauer: A Very Short Introduction. Oxford University Press. ISBN 0-19-280259-3.
- Janaway, Christopher; Robertson, Simon (2012). Nietzsche, Naturalism, and Normativity. Oxford University Press. ISBN 978-0-19-958367-6.
- Johnson, Robert (2008). "Kant's Moral Philosophy". Stanford Encyclopedia of Philosophy.
- Kant, Immanuel (1785). Groundwork of the Metaphysics of Morals – via Wikisource.
- Kant, Immanuel (1788). Critique of Practical Reason – via Wikisource.
- Kant, Immanuel (1991). The Moral Law: Kant's Groundwork of the Metaphysic of Morals. Translated by Paton, Herbert James. Psychology Press. ISBN 978-0-415-07843-6.
- Knight, Kevin (2009). "Catholic Encyclopedia: Categorical Imperative". Catholic Encyclopedia.
- Korsgaard, Christine (1996). Creating the Kingdom of Ends. Cambridge University Press. ISBN 978-0-52149-962-0.
- Korsgaard, Christine (2004). "Fellow Creatures: Kantian Ethics and Our Duties to Animals". The Tanner Lectures on Human Values.
- Korsgaard, Christine M. (2015). "A Kantian Case for Animal Rights". In Višak, Tatjana; Garner, Robert (eds.). The Ethics of Killing Animals. pp. 154–174. doi:10.1093/acprof:oso/9780199396078.001.0001. ISBN 978-0-19-939607-8.
- Leiter, Briain (2004). "Nietzsche's Moral and Political Philosophy". Stanford Encyclopedia of Philosophy.
- Liu, JeeLoo (May 2012). "Moral Reason, Moral Sentiments and the Realization of Altruism: A Motivational Theory of Altruism" (PDF). Asian Philosophy. 22 (2): 93–119. doi:10.1080/09552367.2012.692534. S2CID 11457496.
- Louden, Robert B. (2011). Kant's Human Being:Essays on His Theory of Human Nature. Oxford University Press. ISBN 978-0-19-991110-3.
- MacIntyre, Alasdair (2013). After Virtue. A&C Black. ISBN 978-1-62356-525-1.
- Manninon, Gerard (2003). Schopenhauer, religion and morality: the humble path to ethics. Ashgate Publishing. ISBN 978-0-7546-0823-3.
- Miller, Dale (2013). John Stuart Mill. John Wiley & Sons. ISBN 978-0-7456-7359-2.
- Murdoch, Iris (1970). The Sovereignty of the Good. Routledge & Kegan Paul. ISBN 978-0-415-25399-4.
- O'Neill, Onora (2000). Bounds of Justice. Cambridge University Press. ISBN 978-0-521-44744-7.
- Palmer, Donald (2005). Looking At Philosophy: The Unbearable Heaviness of Philosophy Made Lighter (Fourth ed.). McGraw-Hill Education. ISBN 978-0-07-803826-6.
- Payrow Shabani, Omid (2003). Democracy, power and legitimacy: the critical theory of Jürgen Habermas. University of Toronto Press. ISBN 978-0-8020-8761-4.
- Pietrzykowski, Tomasz (2015). "Kant, Korsgaard and the Moral Status of Animals". Archihwum Filozofii Prawa I Filozofi Społecznej. 2 (11): 106–119.
- Pinckaers, Servais (2003). Morality: The Catholic View. St. Augustine's Press. ISBN 978-1-58731-515-2.
- Pojman, Louis (2008). Ethics: Discovering Right and Wrong. Cengage Learning. ISBN 978-0-495-50235-7.
- Pyka, Marek (2005). "Thomas Nagel on Mind, Morality, and Political Theory". American Journal of Theology & Philosophy. 26 (1/2): 85–95. ISSN 0194-3448. JSTOR 27944340.
- Rachels, James (1999). The Elements of Moral Philosophy (Third ed.). McGraw-Hill. ISBN 0-07-116754-4.
- Regan, Tom (2004). The case for animal rights. University of California Press. ISBN 978-0-52024-386-6.
- Richardson, Henry (18 November 2005). "John Rawls (1921–2002)". Internet Encyclopedia of Philosophy.
- Rohlf, Michael (20 May 2010). "Immanuel Kant". Stanford Encyclopedia of Philosophy.
- Singer, Peter (1983). Hegel: A Very Short Introduction. Oxford University Press. ISBN 978-0-19-160441-6.
- Soble, Alan (2006). Sex from Plato to Paglia: A Philosophical Encyclopedia. Vol. 1. Greenwood Publishing Group. ISBN 978-0-313-33424-5.
- Stern, Robert (2012). Understanding Moral Obligation. New York: Cambridge University Press.
- Stocker, Michael (12 August 1976). "The Schizophrenia of Modern Ethical Theories". The Journal of Philosophy. 73 (14). Journal of Philosophy: 453–466. doi:10.2307/2025782. JSTOR 2025782. S2CID 169644076.
- Sugarman, Jeremy (2010). Methods in Medical Ethics. Georgetown University Press. ISBN 978-1-58901-701-6.
- Sullivan, Roger (1989). Immanuel Kant's Moral Theory. Cambridge University Press. ISBN 978-0-521-36908-4.
- Walker, Paul; Walker, Ally (2018). "The Golden Rule Revisited". Philosophy Now.
- Wilson, Eric Entrican; Denis, Lara (2018). "Kant and Hume on Morality". The Stanford Encyclopedia of Philosophy. Metaphysics Research Lab, Stanford University.
- Wood, Allen (2008). Kantian Ethics. Cambridge University Press. ISBN 978-0-521-67114-9.
- Wood, Allen (1999). Kant's Ethical Thought. Cambridge University Press. ISBN 978-0-521-64836-3.
- Wood, Allen W. (2006). "Kant's Practical Philosophy". In Karl Ameriks (ed.). The Cambridge Companion to German Idealism. Cambridge University Press. pp. 57–75. doi:10.1017/CCOL0521651786.004. ISBN 978-0-8014-8604-3.
