= Groundwork of the Metaphysics of Morals =

Philosophical tract by Immanuel Kant

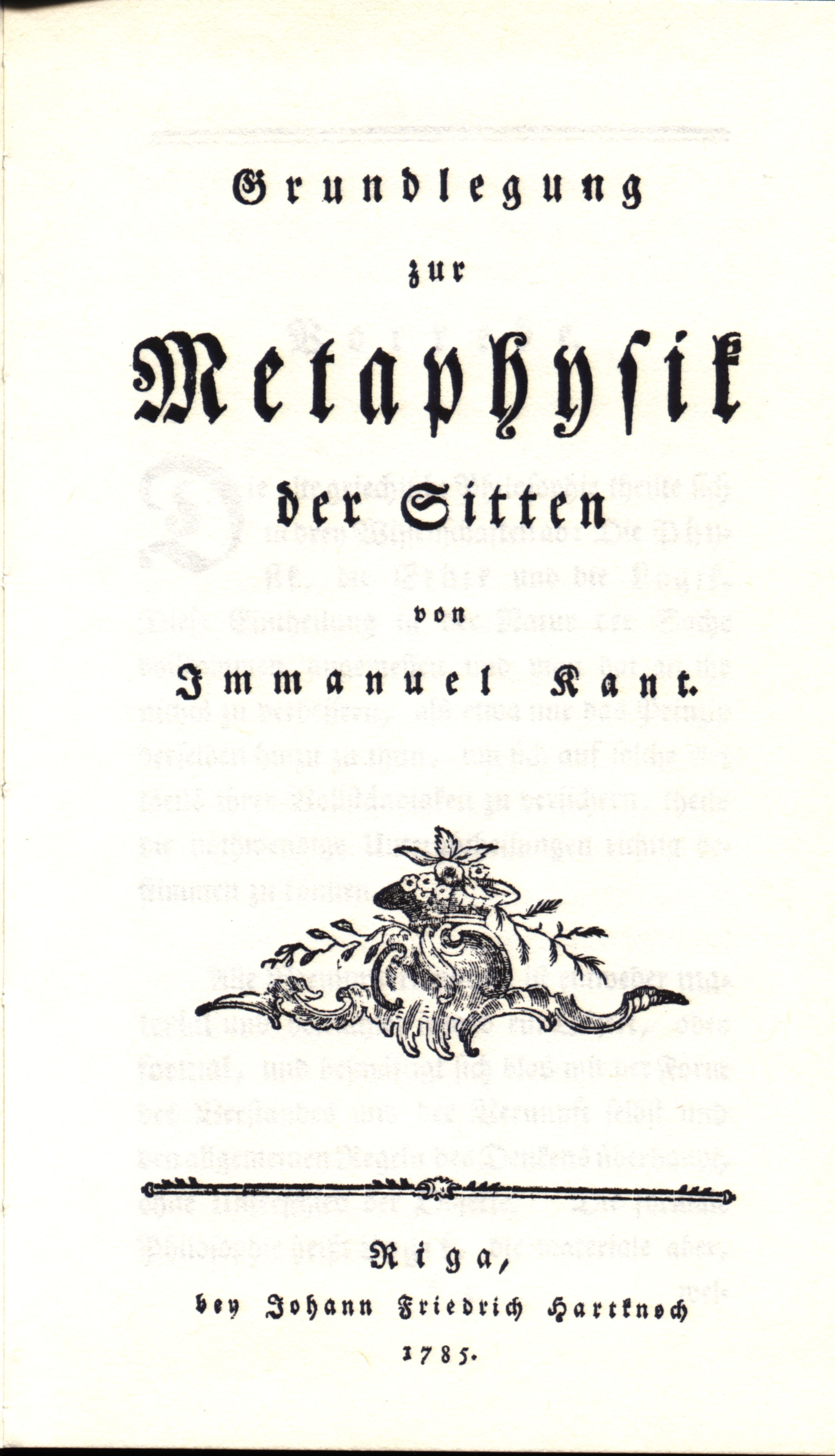
- Author: Immanuel Kant
- Original title: Grundlegung zur Metaphysik der Sitten
- Publication date: 1785

Groundwork of the Metaphysics of Morals (1785; German: Grundlegung zur Metaphysik der Sitten; also known as the Foundations of the Metaphysics of Morals, Grounding of the Metaphysics of Morals, and the Grounding for the Metaphysics of Morals) is the first of Immanuel Kant's mature works on moral philosophy and the first of his trilogy of major works on ethics alongside the Critique of Practical Reason and The Metaphysics of Morals. It remains one of the most influential in the field. Kant conceives his investigation as a work of foundational ethics—one that clears the ground for future research by explaining the core concepts and principles of moral theory, and showing that they are normative for rational agents.

Kant proposes to lay bare the fundamental principle of morality and show that it applies to us. Central to the work is the role of what Kant refers to as the categorical imperative, which states that one must act only according to maxims which one could will to become a universal law. Kant argues that the rightness of an action is determined by the principle that a person chooses to act upon. This stands in stark contrast to the moral sense theories and teleological moral theories that dominated moral philosophy at the time of Kant's career.

The Groundwork is broken into a preface, followed by three sections. Kant begins from common-sense moral reason and shows by analysis the supreme moral law that must be its principle. He then argues that the supreme moral law in fact obligates us. The book is famously difficult, and it is partly because of this that Kant later, in 1788, decided to publish the Critique of Practical Reason.

== Preface ==
In the preface to the Groundwork, motivating the need for pure moral philosophy, Kant makes some preliminary remarks to situate his project and explain his method of investigation.

Kant opens the preface with an affirmation of the Ancient Greek idea of a threefold division of philosophy into logic, physics, and ethics.

Logic is purely formal—it deals only with the form of thought itself, not with any particular objects. Physics and ethics, on the other hand, deal with particular objects: physics is concerned with the laws of nature, ethics with the laws of freedom. Additionally, logic is an a priori discipline, i.e., logical truths do not depend on any particular experience for their justification. By contrast, physics and ethics are mixed disciplines, containing empirical and non-empirical parts. The empirical part of physics deals with contingently true phenomena, like what kind of physical entities there are and the relations in which they stand; the non-empirical part deals with fundamental concepts like space, time, and matter. Similarly, ethics contains an empirical part, which deals with the question of what—given the contingencies of human nature—tends to promote human welfare, and a non-empirical part, which is concerned with an a priori investigation into the nature and substance of morality.

Because it is a priori, Kant calls this latter, non-empirical part of ethics metaphysics of morals. It corresponds to the non-empirical part of physics, which Kant calls metaphysics of nature.

=== Metaphysics of morals ===
Kant proceeds to motivate the need for the special sort of inquiry he calls a metaphysics of morals: “That there must be such a philosophy is evident from the common idea of duty and of moral laws.” The moral law must “carry with it absolute necessity.” (Note: Groundwork 4:389)

The content and the bindingness of the moral law, in other words, do not vary according to the particularities of agents or their circumstances. Given that the moral law, if it exists, is universal and necessary, the only appropriate means to investigate it is through a priori rational reflection. Thus, a correct theoretical understanding of morality requires a metaphysics of morals. Kant believes that, until we have completed this sort of investigation, “morals themselves are liable to all kinds of corruption” because the “guide and supreme norm for correctly estimating them are missing.” A fully specified account of the moral law will guard against the errors and rationalization to which human moral reasoning is prone. (Note: Groundwork 4:390) The search for the supreme principle of morality—the antidote to confusion in the moral sphere—will occupy Kant for the first two chapters of the Groundwork.

=== Pure ethics ===
In essence, Kant's remarks in the preface prepare the reader for the thrust of the ideas he goes on to develop in the Groundwork. The purpose of the Groundwork is to prepare a foundation for moral theory. Because Kant believes that any fact that is grounded in empirical knowledge must be contingent, he can only derive the necessity that the moral law requires from a priori reasoning. It is with this significance of necessity in mind that the Groundwork attempts to establish a pure (a priori) ethics. Such an ethics explains the possibility of a moral law and locates what Kant calls the supreme principle of morality. The aim of the following sections of the Groundwork is to explain what the moral law would have to be like if it existed and to show that, in fact, it exists and is authoritative for us.

== Section One ==
In section one, Kant argues from common-sense morality to the supreme principle of morality, which he calls the categorical imperative. Kant thinks that uncontroversial premises from our shared common-sense morality, and analysis of common sense concepts such as ‘the good’, ‘duty’, and ‘moral worth’, will yield the supreme principle of morality (i.e., the categorical imperative). Kant's discussion in section one can be roughly divided into four parts:

1. the good will;
2. the teleological argument;
3. the three propositions regarding duty; and
4. the categorical imperative.

=== The Good Will ===
Kant thinks that, with the exception of the good will, all goods are qualified. By qualified, Kant means that those goods are good insofar as they presuppose or derive their goodness from something else. For example, wealth can be extremely good if it is used for human welfare, but it can be disastrous if a corrupt mind is behind it. In a similar vein, we often desire intelligence and take it to be good, but we certainly would not take the intelligence of an evil genius to be good. The good will, by contrast, is good in itself. Kant writes, “A good will is not good because of what it effects or accomplishes, because of its fitness to attain some proposed end, but only because of its volition, that is, it is good in itself.” (Note: Groundwork 4:394) The precise nature of the good will is subject to scholarly debate.

=== The Teleological Argument ===
Kant believes that a teleological argument may be given to demonstrate that the “true vocation of reason must be to produce a will that is good.” (Note: Groundwork 4:396) As with other teleological arguments, such as the case with that for the existence of God, Kant's teleological argument is motivated by an appeal to a belief or sense that the whole universe, or parts of it, serve some greater telos, or end/purpose. If nature's creatures are so purposed, Kant thinks their capacity to reason would certainly not serve a purpose of self-preservation or achievement of happiness, which are better served by their natural inclinations. What guides the will in those matters is inclination.

By the method of elimination, Kant argues that the capacity to reason must serve another purpose, namely, to produce good will, or, in Kant's own words, to “produce a will that is...good in itself.” Kant's argument from teleology is widely taken to be problematic: it is based on the assumption that our faculties have distinct natural purposes for which they are most suitable, and it is questionable whether Kant's critical philosophy could be consistent with this sort of argument.

=== The Three Propositions Regarding Duty ===
The teleological argument, if flawed, still offers that critical distinction between a will guided by inclination and a will guided by reason. That will which is guided by reason, Kant will argue, is the will that acts from duty. Kant's argument proceeds by way of three propositions, the last of which is derived from the first two.

==== First proposition ====
Although Kant never explicitly states what the first proposition is, it is clear that its content is suggested by the following common-sense observation. Common sense distinguishes among:

1. the case in which a person clearly acts contrary to duty;
2. the case in which a person's actions coincide with duty, but are not motivated by duty; and
3. the case in which a person's actions coincide with duty because he or she is motivated by duty.

Kant thinks our actions only have moral worth and deserve esteem when they are motivated by duty. Kant illustrates the distinction between (b) and (c) with the example of a shopkeeper who chooses not to overcharge an inexperienced customer. (Note: Groundwork 4:397) The shopkeeper treats his customer fairly, but because it is in his prudent self-interest to do so, in order to preserve his reputation, we cannot assume that he is motivated by duty, and thus the shopkeeper's action cannot be said to have moral worth. Kant contrasts the shopkeeper with the case of a person who, faced with “adversity and hopeless grief”, and having entirely lost his will to live, yet obeys his duty to preserve his life. (Note: Groundwork 4:398) Because this person acts from duty, his actions have moral worth. Kant also notes that many individuals possess an inclination to do good; but however commendable such actions may be, they do not have moral worth when they are done out of pleasure. If, however, a philanthropist had lost all capacity to feel pleasure in good works but still did pursue them out of duty, only then would we say they were morally worthy.

Scholars disagree about the precise formulation of the first proposition. One interpretation asserts that the missing proposition is that an act has moral worth only when its agent is motivated by respect for the law, as in the case of the man who preserves his life only from duty. Another interpretation asserts that the proposition is that an act has moral worth only if the principle acted upon generates moral action non-contingently. If the shopkeeper in the above example had made his choice contingent upon what would serve the interests of his business, then his act has no moral worth.

Kant states that this is how we should understand the Scriptural command to love even one's enemy: love as inclination or sentiment cannot be commanded, only rational love as duty can be.

==== Second proposition ====
Kant's second proposition states: (Note: Groundwork 4:400)

[A]n action from duty has its moral worth not in the purpose to be attained by it but in the maxim in accordance with which it is decided upon, and therefore does not depend upon the realization of the object of the action but merely upon the principle of volition in accordance with which the action is done without regard for any object of the faculty of desire.”

A maxim of an action is its principle of volition. By this, Kant means that the moral worth of an act depends not on its consequences, intended or real, but on the principle acted upon.

==== Third proposition ====
Kant combines these two propositions into a third proposition, a complete statement of our common sense notions of duty. This proposition is that ‘duty is necessity of action from respect for law.’ This final proposition serves as the basis of Kant's argument for the supreme principle of morality, the categorical imperative.

=== Categorical Imperative: Universality ===
Kant believes that all of our actions, whether motivated by inclination or morality, must follow some law. For example, if a person wants to qualify for nationals in ultimate frisbee, he will have to follow a law that tells him to practice his backhand pass, among other things. Notice, however, that this law is only binding on the person who wants to qualify for nationals in ultimate frisbee. In this way, it is contingent upon the ends that he sets and the circumstances that he is in. We know from the third proposition, however, that the moral law must bind universally and necessarily, that is, regardless of ends and circumstances.

At this point, Kant asks, "what kind of law can that be, the representation of which must determine the will, even without regard for the effect expected from it...?" (Note: Groundwork 4:402) He concludes that the only remaining alternative is a law that reflects only the form of law itself, namely that of universality. Thus, Kant arrives at his well-known categorical imperative, the moral law referenced in the above discussion of duty. Kant defines the categorical imperative as the following:

I ought never to act except in such a way that I could also will that my maxim should become a universal law.

Later, at the beginning of Section Two, Kant admits that it is in fact impossible to give a single example of an action that could be certainly said to have been done from duty alone, or ever to know one's own mind well enough to be sure of one's own motives. The important thing, then, is not whether such pure virtue ever actually exists in the world; the important thing is that that reason dictates duty and that we recognize it as such.

== Section Two ==
In Section II, Kant starts from scratch and attempts to move from popular moral philosophy to a metaphysics of morals. Kant begins Section II of the Groundwork by criticizing attempts to begin moral evaluation with empirical observation. He states that even when we take ourselves to be behaving morally, we cannot be at all certain that we are purely motivated by duty and not by inclinations. Kant observes that humans are quite good at deceiving themselves when it comes to evaluating their motivations for acting, and therefore even in circumstances where individuals believe themselves to be acting from duty, it is possible they are acting merely in accordance with duty and are motivated by some contingent desire. However, the fact that we see ourselves as often falling short of what morality demands of us indicates we have some functional concept of the moral law.

Kant begins his new argument in Section II with some observations about rational willing. All things in nature must act according to laws, but only rational beings act in accordance with the representation of a law. In other words, only rational beings have the capacity to recognize and consult laws and principles in order to guide their actions. Thus, only rational creatures have practical reason. The laws and principles that rational agents consult yield imperatives, or rules that necessitate the will. For example, if a person wants to qualify for nationals in ultimate frisbee, he will recognize and consult the rules that tell him how to achieve this goal. These rules will provide him with imperatives that he must follow as long as he wants to qualify for nationals.

=== Imperatives ===
Imperatives are either hypothetical or categorical. Hypothetical imperatives provide the rules an agent must follow when he or she adopts a contingent end (an end based on desire or inclination). So, for example, if I want ice cream, I should go to the ice cream shop or make myself some ice cream. However, notice that this imperative only applies if I want ice cream. If I have no interest in ice cream, the imperative does not apply to me.

Kant posits that there are two types of hypothetical imperative—rules of skill and counsels of prudence. Rules of skill are determined by the particular ends we set and tell us what is necessary to achieve those particular ends. However, Kant observes that there is one end that we all share, namely our own happiness. Unfortunately, it is difficult, if not impossible, to know exactly what will make us happy or how to achieve the things that will make us happy. We can only know through experience what certain things will please us and even then, that could change over time. Therefore, Kant argues, we can at best have counsels of prudence, as opposed to outright rules.

=== Categorical Imperative: Laws of nature ===
Recall that the moral law, if it exists, must apply universally and necessarily. Therefore, a moral law could never rest on hypothetical imperatives, which only apply if one adopts some particular end. Rather, the imperative associated with the moral law must be a categorical imperative. The categorical imperative holds for all rational agents, regardless of whatever varying ends a person may have. If we could find it, the categorical imperative would provide us with the moral law.

What would the categorical imperative look like? We know that it could never be based on the particular ends that people adopt to give themselves rules of action. Kant believes that this leaves us with one remaining alternative, namely that the categorical imperative must be based on the notion of a law itself. Laws (or commands), by definition, apply universally. From this observation, Kant derives the categorical imperative, which requires that moral agents act only in a way that the principle of their will could become a universal law. (Note: Groundwork 4:421) The categorical imperative is a test of proposed maxims; it does not generate a list of duties on its own. The categorical imperative is Kant's general statement of the supreme principle of morality, but Kant goes on to provide three different formulations of this general statement.

=== The Formula of the Universal Law of Nature ===
The first formulation states that an action is only morally permissible if every agent could adopt the same principle of action without generating one of two kinds of contradiction. This is called the Formula for the Universal Law of Nature, which states that one should, “act as if the maxim of your action were to become by your will a universal law of nature.” A proposed maxim can fail to meet such requirement in one of two ways.

==== Contradiction in conception ====
First, one might encounter a scenario in which one's proposed maxim would become impossible in a world in which it is universalized. For example, suppose a person in need of money makes it his or her maxim to attain a loan by making a false promise to pay it back. If everyone followed this principle, nobody would trust another person when he or she made a promise, and the institution of promise-making would be destroyed. However, the maxim of making a false promise in order to attain a loan relies on the very institution of promise-making that universalizing this maxim destroys. Kant calls this a "contradiction in conception" because it is impossible to conceive of the maxim being universalized. (Note: Groundwork 4:424)

==== Contradiction in willing ====
Second, a maxim might fail by generating what Kant calls a "contradiction in willing." This sort of contradiction comes about when the universalized maxim contradicts something that rational agents necessarily will. For example, a person might have a maxim never to help others when they are in need. However, Kant thinks that all agents necessarily wish for the help of others from time to time. Therefore, it is impossible for the agent to will that his or her maxim be universally adopted. If an attempt to universalize a maxim results in a contradiction in conception, it violates what Kant calls a perfect duty. If it results in a contradiction in willing, it violates what Kant calls an imperfect duty. Perfect duties are negative duties, that is duties not to commit or engage in certain actions or activities (for example theft). Imperfect duties are positive duties, duties to commit or engage in certain actions or activities (for example, giving to charity).

In the Groundwork, Kant says that perfect duties never admit of exception for the sake of inclination, (Note: Groundwork 4:421n) which is sometimes taken to imply that imperfect duties do admit of exception for the sake of inclination. However, in a later work (The Metaphysics of Morals), Kant suggests that imperfect duties only allow for flexibility in how one chooses to fulfill them. Kant believes that we have perfect and imperfect duties both to ourselves and to others.

=== The Formula of Humanity ===
The second formulation of the categorical imperative is the Formula of Humanity, which Kant arrives at by considering the motivating ground of the categorical imperative. Because the moral law is necessary and universal, its motivating ground must have absolute worth. (Note: Groundwork 4:428) Were we to find something with such absolute worth, an end in itself, that would be the only possible ground of a categorical imperative. Kant asserts that, “a human being and generally every rational being exists as an end in itself.” The corresponding imperative, the Formula of Humanity, commands that “you use humanity, whether in your own persona or in the person of any other, always at the same time as an end, never merely as a means.” (Note: Groundwork 4:429) When we treat others merely as means to our discretionary ends, we violate a perfect duty. However, Kant thinks that we also have an imperfect duty to advance the end of humanity. For example, making a false promise to another person in order to achieve the end of getting some money treats their rational nature as a mere means to one's selfish end. This is, therefore, a violation of a perfect duty. By contrast, it is possible to fail to donate to charity without treating some other person as a mere means to an end, but in doing so we fail to advance the end of humanity, thereby violating an imperfect duty.

=== The Formula of Autonomy and the Kingdom of Ends ===
The Formula of Autonomy takes something important from both the Formula for the Universal Law of Nature and the Formula of Humanity. The Formula for the Universal Law of Nature involves thinking about your maxim as if it were an objective law, while the Formula of Humanity is more subjective and is concerned with how you are treating the person with whom you are interacting. The Formula of Autonomy combines the objectivity of the former with the subjectivity of the latter and suggests that the agent ask what he or she would accept as a universal law. To do this, he or she would test his or her maxims against the moral law that he or she has legislated. The Principle of Autonomy is, “the principle of every human will as a will universally legislating through all its maxims.” (Note: Groundwork 4:432)

==== Kingdom of ends ====
Kant believes that the Formula of Autonomy yields another “fruitful concept,” the kingdom of ends. The kingdom of ends is the “systematic union” of all ends in themselves (rational agents) and the ends that they set. All ends that rational agents set have a price and can be exchanged for one another. Ends in themselves, however, have dignity and have no equivalent. In addition to being the basis for the Formula of Autonomy and the kingdom of ends, autonomy itself plays an important role in Kant's moral philosophy. Autonomy is the capacity to be the legislator of the moral law, in other words, to give the moral law to oneself. Autonomy is opposed to heteronomy, which consists of having one's will determined by forces alien to it. Because alien forces could only determine our actions contingently, Kant believes that autonomy is the only basis for a non-contingent moral law. It is in failing to see this distinction that Kant believes his predecessors have failed: their theories have all been heteronomous. At this point Kant has given us a picture of what a universal and necessary law would look like should it exist. However, he has yet to prove that it does exist, or, in other words, that it applies to us. That is the task of Section III.

== Section Three ==
In section three, Kant argues that we have a free will and are thus morally self-legislating. The fact of freedom means that we are bound by the moral law. In the course of his discussion, Kant establishes two viewpoints from which we can consider ourselves; we can view ourselves:

1. as members of the world of appearances, which operates according to the laws of nature; or
2. as members of the intellectual world, which is how we view ourselves when we think of ourselves as having free wills and when we think about how to act.

These two different viewpoints allow Kant to make sense of how we can have free wills, despite the fact that the world of appearances follows laws of nature deterministically. Finally, Kant remarks that whilst he would like to be able to explain how morality ends up motivating us, his theory is unable to do so. This is because the intellectual world—in which morality is grounded—is something that we cannot make positive claims about.

=== Freedom and Willing ===
Kant opens section III by defining the will as the cause of our actions. According to Kant, having a will is the same thing as being rational, and having a free will means having a will that is not influenced by external forces. This is a negative definition of freedom—it tells us that freedom is freedom from determination by alien forces. (Note: Groundwork 4:446)

However, Kant also provides a positive definition of freedom: a free will, Kant argues, gives itself a law—it sets its own ends, and has a special causal power to bring them about. A free will is one that has the power to bring about its own actions in a way that is distinct from the way that normal laws of nature cause things to happen. According to Kant, we need laws to be able to act. An action not based on some sort of law would be arbitrary and not the sort of thing that we could call the result of willing.

Because a free will is not merely pushed around by external forces, external forces do not provide laws for a free will. The only source of law for a free will is that will itself. This is Kant's notion of autonomy. Thus, Kant's notion of freedom of the will requires that we are morally self-legislating; that we impose the moral law on ourselves. Kant thinks that the positive understanding of freedom amounts to the same thing as the categorical imperative, and that “a free will and a will under moral laws are one and the same.” (Note: Groundwork 4:447) This is the key notion that later scholars call the reciprocity thesis, which states that a will is bound by the moral law if and only if it is free. That means that if you know that someone is free, then you know that the moral law applies to them, and vice versa. Kant then asks why we have to follow the principle of morality. Although we all may feel the force of our consciences, Kant, examining phenomena with a philosophical eye, is forced to “admit that no interest impels me to do so.” (Note: Groundwork 4:449) He says that we clearly do “regard ourselves as free in acting and so to hold ourselves yet subject to certain laws,” (Note: Groundwork 4:450) but wonders how this is possible. He then explains just how it is possible, by appealing to the two perspectives that we can consider ourselves under.

==== Gods-eye and human perspective ====
According to Kant, human beings cannot know the ultimate structure of reality. Whilst humans experience the world as having three spatial dimensions and as being extended in time, we cannot say anything about how reality ultimately is, from a God's-eye perspective. From this perspective, the world may be nothing like the way it appears to human beings. We cannot get out of our heads and leave our human perspective on the world to know what it is like independently of our own viewpoint; we can only know about how the world appears to us, not about how the world is in itself. Kant calls the world as it appears to us from our point of view the world of sense or of appearances. The world from a God's-eye perspective is the world of things in themselves or the “world of understanding.”

It is the distinction between these two perspectives that Kant appeals to in explaining how freedom is possible. Insofar as we take ourselves to be exercising our free will, Kant argues, we have to consider ourselves from the perspective of the world of understanding. It is only in the world of understanding that it makes sense to talk of free wills. In the world of appearances, everything is determined by physical laws, and there is no room for a free will to change the course of events. If you consider yourself as part of the world of appearances, then you cannot think of yourself as having a will that brings things about.

=== Occupying Two Worlds ===
On Kant's view, the categorical imperative is possible because, although we as rational agents can be thought of as members of both the intelligible and the phenomenal world (understanding and appearance), it is the intelligible world of understanding that “contains the ground of the world of sense [appearance] and so too of its laws.” (Note: Groundwork 4:453) In this sense, the world of understanding is more fundamental than, or ‘grounds’, the world of sense. Because of this, the moral law, which clearly applies to the world of understanding, also applies to the world of sense as well, because the world of understanding has priority. As a result, and because the world of understanding is more fundamental and primary, its laws hold for the world of sense too. The categorical imperative, and therefore the moral law, binds us in the intelligible world and in the phenomenal world of appearances.

Kant argues that autonomous rational agents, like ourselves, think of themselves as having free will. This permits such beings to make judgments such as “you ought to have done that thing that you did not do.” Kant claims, in both this work and in the first Critique, that this notion of freedom cannot be derived from our phenomenal experience. We can be sure that this concept of freedom doesn't come from experience because experience itself contradicts it. Our experience is of everything in the sensible world and in the sensible world, everything that happens does so in accord with the laws of nature and there is no room for a free will to influence events.

So, Kant argues, we are committed to two incompatible positions. From the perspective of practical reason, which is involved when we consider how to act, we have to take ourselves as free. But from the perspective of speculative reason, which is concerned with investigating the nature of the world of appearance, freedom is impossible. So we are committed to freedom on the one hand, and yet on the other hand we are also committed to a world of appearances that is run by laws of nature and has no room for freedom. We cannot give up on either. We cannot avoid taking ourselves as free when we act, and we cannot give up our picture of the world as determined by laws of nature. As Kant puts it, there is a contradiction between freedom and natural necessity. He calls this a dialectic of reason.

The way Kant suggests that we should deal with this dialectic is through an appeal to the two perspectives we can take on ourselves. This is the same sort of move he made earlier in this section. On one perspective, the perspective of the world of understanding, we are free, whereas from the other, the perspective of the world of the senses or appearances, natural laws determine everything that happens. There is no contradiction because the claim to freedom applies to one world, and the claim of the laws of nature determining everything applies to the other. The claims do not conflict because they have different targets.

Kant cautions that we cannot feel or intuit this world of the understanding. He also stresses that we are unable to make interesting positive claims about it because we are not able to experience the world of the understanding. Kant argues that we cannot use the notion of the world of the understanding to explain how freedom is possible or how pure reason could have anything to say about practical matters because we simply do not and cannot have a clear enough grasp of the world of the understanding. The notion of an intelligible world does point us towards the idea of a kingdom of ends, which is a useful and important idea. We just have to be careful not to get carried away and make claims that we are not entitled to.

== Critical reaction ==
In his book On the Basis of Morality (1840), Arthur Schopenhauer presents a careful analysis of the Groundwork. His criticism is an attempt to prove, among other things, that actions are not moral when they are performed solely from duty. Schopenhauer called Kant's ethical philosophy the weakest point in Kant's philosophical system and specifically targeted the Categorical Imperative, labeling it cold and egoistic. While he publicly called himself a Kantian, and made clear and bold criticisms of Hegelian philosophy, he was quick and unrelenting in his analysis of the inconsistencies throughout Kant's long body of work.

Schopenhauer's early admirer, Friedrich Nietzsche, also criticized the Categorical Imperative as "dangerous to life", in that, among other things:

A nation goes to pieces when it confounds its duty with the general concept of duty. Nothing works a more complete and penetrating disaster than every "impersonal" duty, every sacrifice before the Moloch of abstraction.

He takes it to be a peculiar expression of "slavish" egalitarianism, de facto always already prioritizing the sick, the weakly over the healthy and strong – those capable of valid self-legislation to begin with –, thereby undermining the very possibility of human greatness at its root. However, other critics claim that deeper similarities have been overlooked by adherents of unqualified liberalism biased against Nietzsche.

In the 20th century, Lewis White Beck observed that in the course of evaluating Kant's moral philosophy, some modern scholars have neglected his "second critique" (The Critique of Practical Reason) in the course of placing their primary emphasis on the Groundwork of the Metaphysic of Morals. In his Commentary on Kant's Critique of Practical Reason Beck argues that a more comprehensive understanding of Kant's moral philosophy emerges in the "second critique" as a result of the analysis which Kant puts forth in reference to the concept of "freedom", the postulates of "pure practical reason" and the notion of "practical reason". Beck concludes that in the "second critique" Kant weaves these diverse strands into single unified theory of practical moral authority more successfully than in the Groundwork of the Metaphysic of Morals.

== English editions and translations ==
- 1895. Fundamental principles of the metaphysics of ethics, translated by Thomas Kingsmill Abbott. London: Longmans, Green and Co.
  - 1949. Fundamental Principles of the Metaphysic of Morals, tr. T. K. Abbott, introduction by Marvin Fox. Indianapolis, NY: Bobbs-Merrill.
  - 2005. Fundamental principles of the metaphysics of ethics, tr. T. K. Abbott. Mineola, NY: Dover Publications. ISBN 0-486-44309-4 (pbk.)
  - 2005. Groundwork for the metaphysics of morals, tr. T. K. Abbott, edited with revisions by Lara Denis. Peterborough, ON: Broadview Press. ISBN 1-55111-539-5
- 1938. The fundamental principles of the metaphysic of ethics, translated by Otto Manthey-Zorn. New York: D. Appleton-Century.
- 1948. The Moral Law, translated by Herbert James Paton. London: Hutchinson's University Library.
  - 1967. The Moral Law; Kant's Groundwork of the Metaphysic of Morals, translated by H. J. Paton. New York: Barnes & Noble Books.
  - 1991 The Moral Law: Kant's Groundwork of the Metaphysic of Morals, tr. H. J. Paton. London: Routledge. ISBN 0-415-07843-1.
- 1949. "Metaphysical Foundations of Morals," tr. Carl J. Friedrich in The philosophy of Kant; Immanuel Kant's moral and political writings, edited by Carl J. Friedrich. New York: Modern Library.
- 1959 Foundations of the Metaphysics of Morals, and What is Enlightenment?, translated with an introduction by Lewis White Beck. New York: Liberal Arts Press.
  - 1969. Foundations of the Metaphysics of Morals, tr. L. W. Beck, with critical essays edited by Robert Paul Wolff. Indianapolis: Bobbs-Merrill.
  - 1990. Foundations of the Metaphysics of Morals and What is Enlightenment (2nd ed., revised), translated with an introduction by L. W. Beck. New York: Macmillan; London: Collier Macmillan. ISBN 0-02-307825-1.
- 1970. Kant on the foundation of morality; a modern version of the Grundlegung, translated with commentary by Brendan E. A. Liddell. Bloomington: Indiana University Press. ISBN 0253331714 (pbk).
- 1981 Grounding for the metaphysics of morals, translated by James Wesley Ellington. Indianapolis: Hackett Pub. Co. ISBN 0-915145-01-4, 0-915145-00-6 (pbk.).
  - 1983. Ethical philosophy: the complete texts of Grounding for the metaphysics of morals, and Metaphysical principles of virtue, part II of The metaphysics of morals, tr. J. W. Ellington, with an introduction by Warner A. Wick. Indianapolis: Hackett Pub. Co. ISBN 0-915145-43-X, 0-915145-44-8.
  - 1993. Grounding for the metaphysics of morals; with, On a supposed right to lie because of philanthropic concerns (3rd ed.), tr. J. W. Ellington. Indianapolis: Hackett Pub. Co. ISBN 0-87220-167-8, 0-87220-166-X.
  - 1994. Ethical philosophy : the complete texts of grounding for the metaphysics of morals and metaphysical principles of virtue, tr. J. W. Ellington. Indianapolis: Hackett Pub. ISBN 0-87220-321-2, 0-87220-320-4.
- 1998. Groundwork of the metaphysics of morals, translated by Mary J. Gregor, with an introduction by Christine Korsgaard. Cambridge: Cambridge University Press. ISBN 0-521-62235-2, 0-521-62695-1.
- 2002. Groundwork for the metaphysics of morals, translated Arnulf Zweig, edited by Thomas E. Hill, Jr. and Arnulf Zweig. Oxford: Oxford University Press. ISBN 0-19-875180-X.
- 2002. Groundwork for the metaphysics of morals, translated Allen W. Wood, with essays by J. B. Schneewind, et al. New Haven: Yale University Press. ISBN 0-300-09486-8, 0-300-09487-6.
- 2005. Groundwork for the Metaphysic of Morals, edited for easier reading by Jonathan F. Bennett.
- 2011. Groundwork of the Metaphysics of Morals: A German-English Edition, edited and translated by Mary Gregor and Jens Timmermann. Cambridge: Cambridge University Press. ISBN 978-0-521-51457-6.
- 2013. Groundlaying toward the Metaphysics of Morals, two translations (one for scholars, one for students) in multiple formats, by Stephen Orr.
- 2019. 'Groundwork for the Metaphysics of Morals', edited and translated by Christopher Bennett, Joe Saunders and Robert Stern. Oxford: Oxford University Press. ISBN 978-0198786191.

== See also ==
- Immanuel Kant bibliography
- Kantianism
- Pure practical reason
