= Critique of Practical Reason =

1788 book by Immanuel Kant

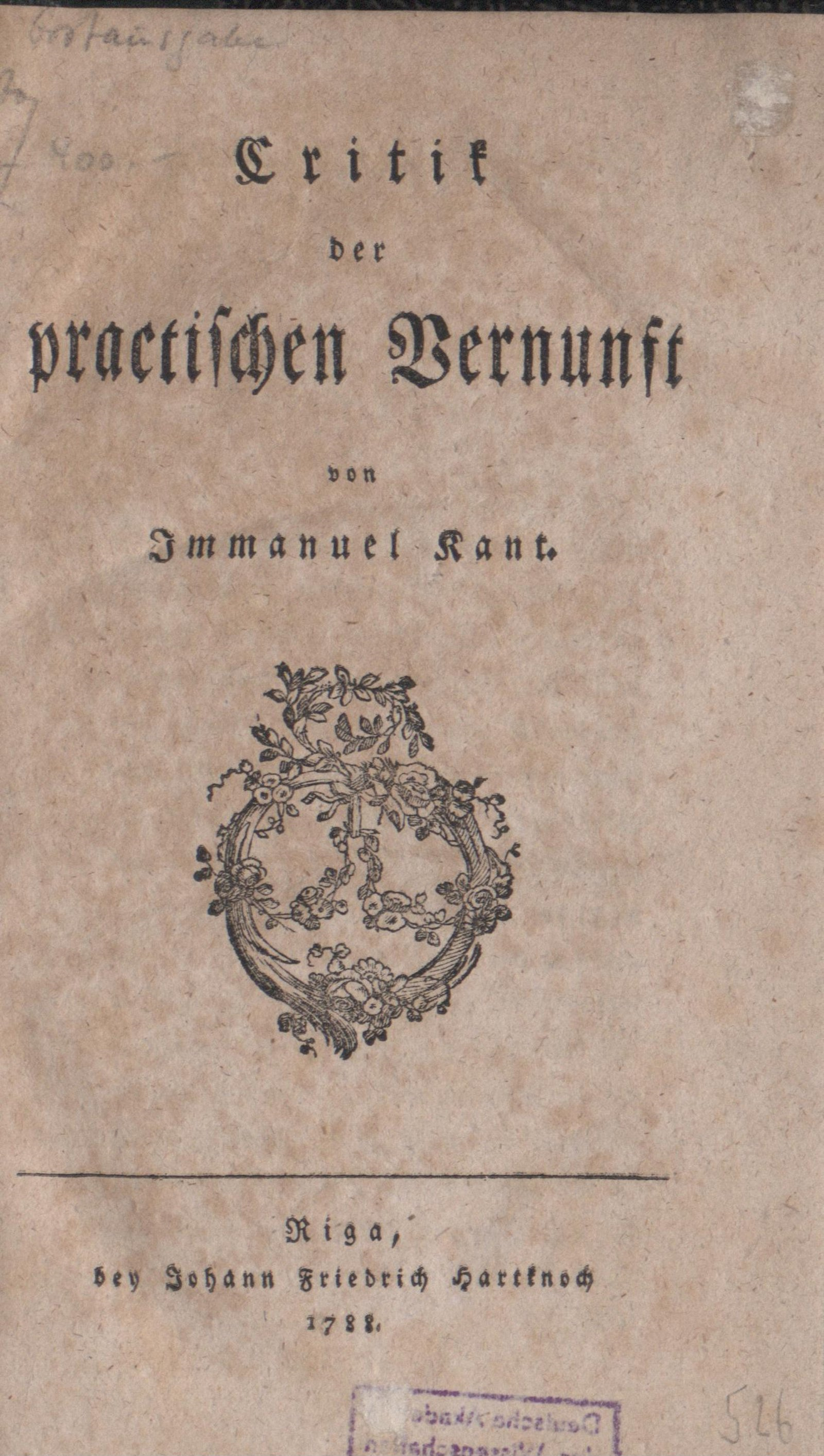
- 1788 German edition
- Author: Immanuel Kant
- Original title: Critik der practischen Vernunft ^{a}
- Translator: Thomas Kingsmill Abbott
- Language: German
- Subject: Moral philosophy
- Published: 1788
- Media type: Print
- Preceded by: Critique of Pure Reason
- Followed by: Critique of Judgment
- ^{a} Kritik in contemporary German.

The Critique of Practical Reason (German: Kritik der praktischen Vernunft) is the second of Immanuel Kant's three critiques, published in 1788. Hence, it is sometimes referred to as the "second critique". It follows on from Kant's first critique, the Critique of Pure Reason, and is one of his major works on moral philosophy. While Kant had already published one significant work in moral philosophy, the Groundwork of the Metaphysics of Morals (1785), the Critique of Practical Reason was intended to develop his account of the will as determinable by (or able to act from) the moral law alone, place his ethical views within the larger framework of his system of critical philosophy, and expand on certain themes in his moral philosophy such as the feeling of respect for the moral law and the concept of the highest good.

== Context ==
Kant did not initially plan to publish a separate critique of practical reason. He published the first edition of the Critique of Pure Reason in May 1781 as a "critique of the entire faculty of reason in general" (viz., of both theoretical and practical reason) and a "propaedeutic" or preparation investigating "the faculty of reason in regard to all pure a priori cognition" to set up for a metaphysics of nature and a metaphysics of morals.

Next, Kant began work on a metaphysics of morals by writing the Groundwork of the Metaphysics of Morals, published in 1785. Certain remarks in that work show that Kant had changed his mind about the idea of a critique of practical reason. In the Preface, Kant distinguished between a "critique of pure practical reason" and a "critique of pure speculative reason". He also came to think that a metaphysics of morals could only really be founded on the former critique just as a metaphysics of nature needed the latter critique. A critique of pure practical reason, Kant thought, was less necessary than a critique of pure speculative reason since "in moral matters human reason can easily be brought to a high degree of correctness and accomplishment, even in the most common understanding". The third section titled "Transition from metaphysics of morals to the critique of pure practical reason" was written to accomplish what he originally thought was at least partially needed in a critique of pure practical reason to properly set up a metaphysics of morals.

However, Kant then changed his mind again and planned the Critique of Practical Reason as an appendix to the second edition of the Critique of Pure Reason to respond to some of the criticisms made by reviewers and commenters against the latter work. He declared his plan in an announcement he published in the Allgemeine Literatur-Zeitung in November 1786, but shortly abandoned it and completed the second edition of the Critique of Pure Reason, published in April 1787, without an appended critique of practical reason.

Finally, in June 1787, Kant sent the completed manuscript of his new Critique of Practical Reason to printers in Halle where it was finally published in December 1787 but listed as published in 1788.

== Structure of the work ==
The work's structure is based on his earlier text, the Critique of Pure Reason. After a preface and an introduction, the second Critique is split into a Doctrine of Elements and a Doctrine of Method. The former part is further separated into an Analytic and a Dialectic of pure practical reason.

- The Analytic establishes Kant's theory of practical rationality. There he outlines and analyzes the principles of morality, shows that pure reason is practical (viz. that reason can drive or motivate our actions independently of any empirical conditions lying in the senses and feeling), discusses the object or aim of pure practical reason (the good), and deals with the non-empirical/pure incentives or "motivating springs" (Triebfeder) of morals.
- The Dialectic is "the exposition and resolution of illusion in the judgments of practical reason", about topics like the highest good and the errors previous philosophers made by putting it as the basis and motivation of morality. It also discusses how the existence of God and the soul's immortality as "postulates of practical reason" fit into the idea of the highest good.

The Doctrine of Method discusses moral education and how "one can provide the laws of pure practical reason with access to the human mind and influence on its maxims".

=== Divisions of the Critique of Practical Reason ===
Preface
Introduction

Part I. Doctrine of the Elements of Pure Practical Reason

Book I. Analytic of Pure Practical Reason

Chapter I. On the Principles of Pure Practical Reason

§1. Explication (of practical principles)
§2–4. Theorems I-III
§5–6. Problems I & II
§7. Basic Law of Pure Practical Reason (Categorical imperative)
§8. Theorem IV

a. Practical Material Determining Bases (Rejection of previous philosophical bases of morality)

I. On the Deduction of the Principles of Pure Practical Reason
II. On the Authority of Pure Reason in Its Practical Use to an Expansion That Is Not Possible for It in Its Speculative Use

Chapter II. On the Concept of an Object of Pure Practical Reason

a. Table of the Categories of Freedom in Regard to the Concepts of Good and Evil
b. Typic of the Pure Practical Power of Judgment

Chapter III. On the Incentives of Pure Practical Reason

a. Critical Examination of the Analytic of Pure Practical Reason (Comparison with the Critique of Pure Reason's structure and refutations of other theories on freedom of the will)

Book II. Dialectic of Pure Practical Reason

Chapter I. On a Dialectic of Pure Practical Reason as Such
Chapter II. On a Dialectic of Pure Reason in Determining the Concept of the Highest Good

I–II. Antinomy of Practical Reason & its Critical Annulment
III. On the Primacy of Pure Practical Reason in Its Linkage with Speculative Reason
IV-V. The Immortality of the Soul & God's Existence, as Postulates of Pure Practical Reason
VI. On the Postulates of Pure Practical Reason as Such
VII. How It Is Possible to Think an Expansion of Pure Reason for a Practical Aim without Thereby Also Expanding Its Cognition as Speculative
VIII. On Assent from a Need of Pure Reason
IX. On the Wisely Commensurate Proportion of the Human Being's Cognitive Powers to His Practical Vocation

Part II. Doctrine of the Method of Pure Practical Reason

Conclusion

== Preface and Introduction ==
Kant sketches out here what is to follow. Most of these two chapters focus on comparing the situation of theoretical and of practical reason and therefore discusses how the Critique of Practical Reason compares to the Critique of Pure Reason.

The first Critique, "of Pure Reason", was a criticism of the pretensions of those who use pure theoretical reason, who claim to attain metaphysical truths beyond the ken of applied reasoning. The conclusion was that pure theoretical reason must be restrained, because it produces confused arguments when applied outside of its appropriate sphere. However, the Critique of Practical Reason is not a critique of pure practical reason, but rather a defense of it as being capable of grounding behavior superior to that grounded by desire-based practical reasoning. It is actually a critique, then, of the pretensions of applied or empirical practical reason.

Kant informs us that while the first Critique concluded that God, freedom, and immortality are unknowable on theoretic grounds, the second Critique will mitigate the force this claim on practical grounds. Freedom is revealed by the actuality of practical life because it is revealed by the moral law. God and immortality are also knowable (only on practical grounds), but practical reason now requires belief in these postulates of reason. Kant once again invites his dissatisfied critics to actually provide a proof of God's existence and shows that this is impossible because the various arguments (ontological, cosmological and teleological) for God's existence all depend essentially on the idea that existence is a predicate inherent to the concepts to which it is applied.

Kant insists that the Critique can stand alone from the earlier Groundwork of the Metaphysics of Morals, although it addresses some criticisms leveled at that work (e.g., Pistorius' objection that Kant established the moral principle before the concept of the good). This work will proceed at a higher level of abstraction.

While valid criticisms of the Groundwork are to be addressed, Kant dismisses many criticisms that he finds unhelpful. He suggests that many of the defects that reviewers have found in his arguments are in fact only in their brains, which are too lazy to grasp his ethical system as a whole. As to those who accuse him of writing incomprehensible jargon, he challenges them to find more suitable language for his ideas or to prove that they are really meaningless. He reassures the reader that the second Critique will be more accessible than the first.

Last, a sketch of the second Critique is then presented in the Introduction. It is modeled on the first Critique: the Analytic will investigate the operations of the faculty in question; the Dialectic will investigate how this faculty can be led astray; and the Doctrine of Method will discuss the questions of moral education.

== Analytic: Chapter One ==
Practical reason is the faculty for determining the will, which operates by applying a general principle of action to one's particular situation. For Kant, a practical principle can be either a mere maxim if it is based on the agent's desires or a law if it applies universally. Any principle that presupposes a previous desire for some object in the agent always presupposes that the agent is the sort of person who would be interested in that particular object. Anything that an agent is interested in can only be contingent, however, and never necessary since it is only valid for that agent alone. Therefore, it cannot be a law, but only a maxim.

To say that the law is to seek the greatest happiness of the greatest number or the greatest good, always presupposes some interest in the greatest happiness, the greatest number, the greatest good, and so on. This cannot be the basis for any universal moral law. Kant concludes that the source of the nomological character of the moral law derives not from its content but from its form alone. The content of the universal moral law, the categorical imperative, must be nothing over and above the law's form, otherwise it will be dependent and based on the desires that the law's possessor has. The only law whose content consists in its form (viz., the form of universality), according to Kant, is the statement:

Act in such a way that the maxim of your will could always hold at the same time as a principle of a universal legislation.

Kant then argues that a will which acts on the practical law is a will which is acting on the idea of the form of law, an idea of reason which has nothing to do with the senses. Hence the moral will is independent of the world of the senses, the world where it might be constrained by one's contingent desires. The will is therefore fundamentally free. The converse also applies: if the will is free, then it must be governed by a rule, but a rule whose content does not restrict the freedom of the will. The only appropriate rule is the rule whose content is equivalent to its form, the categorical imperative. To follow the practical law is to be autonomous, whereas to follow any of the other types of contingent laws (or hypothetical imperatives) is to be heteronomous and therefore unfree. The moral law expresses the positive content of freedom, while being free from influence expresses its negative content.

Kant then lists and examines six classical moral principles as practical "material" determinants of morality:

I. Subjective

A. External

1. Education (Montaigne)
2. Civil government (Mandeville)

B. Internal

3. Physical feeling (Epicurus)
4. Moral feeling (Hutcheson)

II. Objective

A. Internal

5. Perfection (Wolff and the Stoics)

B. External

6. Will of God (Crusius and other theological moralists)

He concludes that all of these doctrines fail precisely because deducing or basing morality from various ultimate objects, such as happiness or perfection, is impossible. This makes these principles heteronomous and therefore fundamentally inadequate to reason.

Kant next argues that we are conscious of the operation of the moral law on us and it is through this consciousness that we are conscious of our freedom and not through any kind of special faculty. Though our actions are normally determined by the calculations of "self-love", we realize that we can ignore such contingencies when moral duty is at stake. Consciousness of the moral law as such is a priori and unanalysable.

He ends this chapter by discussing Hume's denial of the claim that the concept of causation possesses any objective validity. Hume argues that we can never see one event cause another, only the constant conjunction of events. It is subjective necessity (habit), according to Hume, that makes us view events that occur repeatedly alongside or after one another as being causally connected. Kant suggests that if Hume's view were universally accepted, then Kant could not have distinguished causality as being both conditioned and objectively valid. Thus he would lack the necessary empty conception of unconditioned causation necessary to prevent the conflating of the phenomenal and noumenal worlds. Since we are autonomous, Kant subsequently claims that we can know something about the noumenal world as unconditioned, namely that we are in it and play a causal role as unconditioned moral agents. This standpoint, however, remains exclusively practical. Consequently, his views advanced do not challenge our limited theoretical knowledge of the things in themselves; theoretical speculation on the noumenal world is avoided.

== Analytic: Chapter Two ==
Kant begins by explaining how, for practical reason, every motive one has intends some effect on the world, whose realization is the production of its object. In contrast, the concept of an object of pure practical reason is one whose possibility is distinguished from impossibility in virtue of its capacity to be brought about by a willing of the necessary action independently of one's material conditions for doing so. When it is desire that is driving us, we first examine the possibilities that the world leaves open to us, selecting some effect at which we wish to aim. Acting on the practical moral law does not work in this way. The only possible object of the practical law is the Good, since the Good is always an appropriate object for the practical law.

It is necessary to avoid the danger of understanding the practical law simply as the law that tells us to pursue the good, and try to understand the Good as that at which the practical law aims. If we do not understand the good in terms of the practical law, then we need some other analysis by which to understand it. The only alternative is to mistakenly understand the Good as the pursuit of pleasure and evil as the production of pain to oneself.

This sort of confusion between the Good and pleasure also arises when we confuse the concepts of good versus evil with the concepts of well-being versus bad. Well-being, when contrasted with the bad, is merely pleasure. But this is not the case with the good, in the sense of morally good. A morally good person may suffer from a painful disease (bad), but he does not therefore become a bad (evil) person. If a morally bad person is punished for his crimes, it may be bad (painful) for him, but good and just in the moral sense.

Past philosophical investigations into morality have erred in that they have attempted to define the moral in terms of the good rather than the other way around. As a result, they have all fallen victim to the same error of confusing pleasure under one guise or another with morality. If one desires the good, one will act to satisfy that desire, that is in order to produce pleasure.

The moral law, in Kant's view, is equivalent to the idea of freedom. Since the noumenal cannot be perceived, we can only know that something is morally right by intellectually considering whether a certain action that we wish to commit could be universally performed. Kant calls the idea that we can know what is right or wrong only through abstract reflection moral rationalism. This is to be contrasted with two alternative, mistaken approaches to moral epistemology: moral empiricism, which takes moral good and evil to be something we can apprehend from the world and moral mysticism, which takes morality to be a matter of sensing some supernatural property, such as the approbation of God. Although both positions are mistaken and harmful, according to Kant, moral empiricism is much more so because it is equivalent to the theory that the morally right is nothing more than the pursuit of pleasure.

In this chapter, Kant makes his clearest and most explicit formulation of the position he adopts with respect to the question of the fundamental nature of morality. Kant's position is that moral goodness, which consists in following the rule of the categorical imperative, is more fundamental to ethics than good consequences, and that it is the right motivations—an obligation to duty—which is criterial for defining a person as good. Hence, Kant is a deontologist, in the terminology of contemporary philosophy, particularly that of analytic philosophy. Hence, he concludes that we can never have sure insight into whether one has witnessed a genuinely moral act, since the moral rightness, or lack thereof, consists in the will's having been determined to action in the right way from the noumenal world, which is by definition unknowable. For this reason among others, he is categorized as a moral rationalist.

== Analytic: Chapter Three ==
Acting morally requires being directly motivated by the moral law. If the person complies with what the moral law requires, but only because of a presupposed feeling rather than for the sake of the moral law alone, then their action has legality but not morality. For Kant, moral actions must also be done out of the incentive of the moral law. An incentive or motivating spring (Triebfeder) is defined as the "subjective determining ground of the will of a being whose reason does not by its nature necessarily conform with the objective law", viz., the basis of action for the subject's will whose reason does not always conform to acting from the moral law.

As a free will, the will must act solely from the law and even push aside any inclinations and desires that might go against the moral law. We have a natural propensity to follow self-love and strive to please ourselves by satisfying our desires. We are also inclined to self-conceit and to think that we are the center of everything and deserve to do whatever we wish. The moral law restricts the "influence of self-love on the supreme practical principle" and shoots down our self-conceit insofar as it has us make ourselves an unconditional practical rule for action over and above the moral law. Thus, the moral law humiliates us and produces in us respect for the moral law, which is a feeling that does not arise in us from sensual (empirical) impulses, but rather from pure reason through the awareness and recognition of the moral law's validity.

Kant ends this chapter by comparing the structure of the second critique with the Critique of Pure Reason. In comparing the former with the latter critique, Kant refers to the different structures of the analytical parts between the two works. Kant states that the Analytic of the Critique of Pure Reason begins by analyzing the a priori elements of sensibility (space and time), then examines the most fundamental and essential concepts of the human mind with regard to theoretical knowledge (the categories), and lastly ends with principles. The train of thought in the second critique is reversed. Since the Critique of Practical Reason deals with a will which acts according to certain principles (the moral law), it had to search for a principle that gives instructions for moral action and thus start from the possibility a priori principles for moral action or conduct. From there, it proceeded to concepts (the purely rational concepts of absolutely good and evil), and lastly ended with how pure practical reason related to sensibility with regard to moral feeling (respect for the moral law). Additionally, Kant also discusses his solution to the compatibility of natural determinism and human freedom against philosophers such as Leibniz (whose solution Kant calls "the freedom of a turnspit") and Hume.

== Dialectic: Chapter One ==
Pure reason, in both its theoretical and practical forms, faces the fundamental problem that things in the phenomenal realm of experience are conditional (i.e. they depend on something else) but pure reason always seeks for the unconditional. The solution to this is that the unconditional, according to Kant, is only to be found in the noumenal world. Pure theoretic reason, when it attempts to reach beyond its limits into the unconditional is bound to fail and the result is the creation of antinomies of reason.

Antinomies are conflicting statements both of which appear to be validated by reason. Kant exposed several such antinomies of speculative reason in the first Critique. In the second Critique, he finds an antinomy of pure practical reason whose resolution is necessary in order to further our knowledge.

In this case, the antinomy consists in the fact that the object of pure practical reason must be the highest good (Summum bonum). Good actions depend on the highest good to make them worthwhile. However, assuming the existence of a highest good leads to paradox and assuming the non-existence of a highest good also leads to paradox.

== Dialectic: Chapter Two ==
Kant posits two different senses of "the highest good." On one sense (the supreme), it refers to that which is always good and which is required for all other goods. This sense is equivalent to "dutifulness". In another sense (the perfect), it refers to the best of good states, even if part of that state is only contingently good. In this latter sense, the highest good combines virtuousness with happiness.

The highest good is the object of pure practical reason, so we cannot use the latter unless we believe that the former is achievable. However, virtue obviously does not necessarily lead to happiness in this world and vice versa. To aim at one is not to aim at the other and it seems to be a matter of chance whether the rest of the world will fill in the gap by rewarding us for our virtuous behavior.

But Kant's solution is to point out that we do not only exist phenomenally but also noumenally. Though we may not be rewarded with happiness in the phenomenal world, we may still be rewarded in an afterlife which can be posited as existing in the noumenal world. Since it is pure practical reason, and not just the maxims of impure desire-based practical reason, which demands the existence of such an afterlife, immortality, union with God and so on, then these things must be necessary for the faculty of reason as a whole and therefore they command assent.

The highest good requires the highest level of virtue as the supreme moral condition for being worthy of happiness. We can know by self-examination that such virtue does not exist in us now, nor is it likely to exist in the foreseeable future. In fact, the only way in which the fallible human will can become similar to the holy will is for it to take an eternity to achieve perfection. Therefore, we can postulate the existence of immortality. This postulate allows us to conceive how it is possible for us in some way to achieve a will that is completely adequate to the moral law, viz., a will similar to the holy will. If we do not postulate it, we will be led to either soften the demands of morality in order to make them achievable here and now or we will make the absurd demand on ourselves that we must achieve the holy will now.

The highest good also requires the highest level of happiness, in order to reward the highest level of virtue. We therefore need to postulate that there is an omniscient and omnipotent God who can order the world justly and reward us for our virtue. However, this does not mean that God is to be the basis for our moral action. Rather, this postulate of God's existence gives us a way to understand for a practical aim how the highest level of happiness proportionate to the highest level of virtue could be possible.

== Doctrine of method ==
In the first Critique, the Doctrine of Method plans out the scientific study of the principles of pure theoretical reason. Here, however, the Doctrine of Method will instead be a discussion of how the principles of practical reason can be brought to bear on the mind. In other words, the Doctrine of Method in the second Critique is fundamentally concerned with moral education: the question of how we can make people live and act morally.

Kant has shown that truly moral behavior requires more than just the outward show of good behavior; it also requires the right inner motivations. The cynic or skeptic might be doubtful as to whether it is truly possible for human beings to act out of an "obligation to duty." In his view, even if we could produce a simulacrum of a moral society, it would all be an enormous theater of hypocrisy, since everyone would inwardly, privately continue to pursue his or her own advantage. Moreover, this outward show of morality would not be stable, but dependent on its continuing to be to the advantage of each individual. Fortunately, Kant believes, such doubts are misguided.

Almost any time there is a social gathering of some sort, the conversation will include gossip and argumentation which entails moral judgments and evaluations about the rightness or wrongness of the actions of others. Even people who normally do not enjoy intricate arguments tend to reason acutely and precisely when they are caught about in the justification or condemnation of the moral worth of the actions of their next-door neighbor or the deceased.

Although moral education will first begin with "preparatory guidance" to bring the child onto the path of morals by attracting them through gain and scaring them with harm, it should soon abandon this practice altogether and make use of this natural human tendency for moral evaluation. This is done by a moral catechism and presenting the students with historical examples of good and evil actions. Through debating and discussing the worth of these examples on a case-by-case basis, the students will be given the opportunity to experience for themselves the admiration we feel for moral goodness and the disapproval that we feel for moral evil.

However, it is necessary to select the right sorts of examples in order to demonstrate genuine moral goodness. And here, Kant says, we are liable to error in two ways. The first type of error consists in trying to attract students into being moral by providing them examples in which morality and self-love coincide. The second type of error consists in trying to emotionally arouse the students about morality by providing examples of extraordinary moral heroism, above what morality normally requires. The examples we choose should stress dutifulness and purity of intention.

The first of these methods, argues Kant, is destined to fail because students will not come to understand the unconditional nature of duty. The examples will also not be very inspiring. When we see extraordinary self-sacrifice in the name of following a principle independently of any advantage or gain, we are inspired and moved. But when we see someone following a principle with hardly any sacrifice or cost to himself, we are not equally impressed.

The second method will also fail because it appeals to the emotions rather than to reason. Only reason can produce firm long-lasting changes in a person's character. This method also leads students to associate morality with the impossible theatrics of melodrama, and therefore to disdain the everyday obligations they should be fulfilling as beneath them.

Kant ends the second Critique on a hopeful note about the future of ethics, stating that "[t]wo things fill the mind with ever new and increasing admiration and reverence, the more often and more steadily one reflects on them: the starry heavens above me and the moral law within me". The wonders of both the physical and the ethical worlds are not far for us to find: to feel awe, we should only look upward to the stars or inward to the moral law which we carry within us. The study of the physical world was dormant for centuries and wrapped in superstition before the physical sciences actually came into existence. We are allowed to hope that soon the moral sciences will replace superstition with knowledge about ethics.

== Influence ==
The second Critique exercised a decisive influence over the subsequent development of the field of ethics and moral philosophy beginning with Johann Gottlieb Fichte's Doctrine of Science. Fichte felt that studying Kant's critical philosophy in 1790 helped him overcome his crisis of metaphysical determinism. He wrote a letter in late 1790 to Friedrich August Weisshuhn about his excitement after reading the second Critique and says that "[p]ropositions which I thought could never be overturned have been overturned for me. Things have been proven to me which I thought could never be proven—for example, the concept of absolute freedom, the concept of duty, etc.— and I feel all the happier for it". Later, during the 20th century, it became the principal reference point for deontological moral philosophy and Kantian ethics.

In his A Commentary on Kant's Critique of Practical Reason (1961) The American philosopher Lewis White Beck asserted that Kant's Critique of Practical Reason has unfortunately been neglected by some modern scholars and sometimes even supplanted in their minds by Kant's Foundations of the Metaphysics of Morals. He further argued that students can also acquire a complete understanding of Kant's moral philosophy by reviewing Kant's analysis of the concepts of both freedom and practical reason as presented in the "second critique". Beck asserts that Kant's "second critique" serves to weave each of these diverse strands into a unified pattern for a comprehensive theory on moral authority in general.

== English translations ==
- Kant's Critique of Practical Reason and Other Works on the Theory of Ethics. Translated by Thomas Kingsmill Abbott (6th ed.). London: Longmans, Green, and Co. 1909.
- Critique of Practical Reason and Other Writings in Moral Philosophy. Translated by Lewis White Beck. Chicago: University of Chicago Press. 1949.
- Kant, Immanuel. Critique of practical reason. In Practical Philosophy. Edited and translated by Mary J. Gregor. Cambridge University Press, 1996. ISBN 9780521654081.
- Kant, Immanuel (1998). King, G. Heath; Weitzman, Ronald (eds.). Critique of Practical Reason. Translated by Cassirer, Heinrich W. Wisconsin: Marquette University Press. ISBN 9780874626162.
- Kant, Immanuel (2002). Critique of Practical Reason. Translated by Pluhar, Werner S. Indianapolis: Hackett Publishing Company, Inc. ISBN 9780872206175.
- Kant, Immanuel (2015). Gregor, Mary J. (ed.). Critique of Practical Reason. Translated by Mary J. Gregor (2nd ed.). Cambridge University Press. ISBN 9781107467057.

== Referencing ==
The A numbers used as standard references refer to the page numbers of the original (1788) German edition.
