= Allen W. Wood =

American philosopher (born 1942)

- Born: Allen William Wood; October 26, 1942 (age 83); Seattle, Washington, U.S.

Education
- Education: Reed College (BA); Yale University (MA); Yale University (PhD)
- Thesis: Kant's Moral Religion (1968)
- Doctoral advisor: George Schrader

Philosophical work
- Era: Contemporary philosophy
- Region: Western philosophy
- School: Kantian ethics
- Doctoral students: Robert M. Wallace
- Main interests: Kant, ethics, German idealism, social philosophy

Allen William Wood (born October 26, 1942) is an American philosopher specializing in the work of Immanuel Kant and German idealism, with particular interests in ethics and social philosophy. One of the world's foremost Kant scholars, he is the Ruth Norman Halls professor of philosophy at Indiana University, Ward W. and Priscilla B. Woods Professor, emeritus, at Stanford University, and before that a professor at Cornell University across parts of four decades. He has also held professorships and visiting appointments at several other universities in the United States and Europe. In addition to popularising and clarifying the ethical thought of Kant, Wood has also mounted arguments against the validity of trolley problems in moral philosophy.

== Life and career ==
Born in Seattle, Washington, at Reed College Wood obtained a B.A. degree in 1964 which was followed at Yale University by an M.A. in 1966 and a Ph.D. in 1968.

Wood held a lengthy professorship at Cornell University, one that began as an assistant professor in 1968 and then moved to the associate level in 1973 and then gained the full level in 1980. At Cornell, he was known for teaching courses on Kant, but some of the other courses he taught included "Modern Philosophy", "Religion and Reason", "Kant and Hegel", and "Philosophy of Marx". He was elected as a faculty delegate to the University Senate in 1970. Wood departed Cornell in 1996.

He subsequently has held professorships at Yale University, Stanford University, and at Indiana University since 2008. Additionally, he has held visiting appointments at the University of Michigan, University of California at San Diego and Oxford University, where he was Isaiah Berlin Visiting professor in 2005, and has been affiliated with the Freie Universität Berlin in 1983-84 and the University of Bonn in 1991–1992.

== Philosophical work ==
Wood has written prolifically on many subjects in moral and social philosophy, and publications he has authored include: Kant's Moral Religion (1970), Kant's Rational Theology (1978), Karl Marx (1981), Hegel's Ethical Thought (1990), Kant's Ethical Thought (1999), Unsettling Obligations (2002), Kant (2004), Kantian Ethics (2007) and The Free Development of Each: Studies in Freedom, Right and Ethics in Classical German Philosophy (2014). He continued his 'Ethical Thought' series with a book entitled Fichte's Ethical Thought (2016), fulfilling his earlier suggestion that "having written a book on Hegel's Ethical Thought and a book on Kant's Ethical Thought, I should... write a book... on Fichte's Ethical Thought."

Along with Paul Guyer, Wood is general editor of the Cambridge Edition of Kant's Writings in English Translation, having contributed to six volumes, in particular the one of Critique of Pure Reason. He has also edited Self and Nature in Kant's Philosophy (1984), Hegel: Elements of the Philosophy of Right (1991), Kant: Groundwork for the Metaphysics of Morals (2002), Fichte: Attempt at a Critique of All Revelation (2010), and the Cambridge History of Philosophy in the Nineteenth Century (1790-1870), with Songsuk Susan Hahn (2012).

=== Kantian ethics ===
Wood is a leading scholar of Kant's moral philosophy. He has worked extensively to revise public and professional perspectives of Kant's moral philosophy, and to elucidate the "proper aims and structure of a moral theory and the way moral theories relate to ordinary moral decisions." He has suggested that John Rawls and Onora O'Neill have "made people pay more serious attention to Kantian ethical theory." He suggests that many of the problems reported in respect of Kantian ethics are shared by all ethical theories, and that in the context of the problems concerning free will "no rival theory has a satisfactory solution to it."

=== Groundwork to the Metaphysics of Morals ===
Wood edited and produced his own translation to Kant's Groundwork to the Metaphysics of Morals, which is the book he always uses to introduce Kantian ethics to students, and the only text by Kant he teaches in general course on ethical theory. He has suggested that "the first fifty times I read the Groundwork I did not understand it at all, but accepted many of the common errors, because they were easy to commit and had become hallowed by generations of misreading by others."

=== Other ethical theories ===
Although critical of consequentialist moral theories, he has nonetheless engaged with representatives of this tradition and has mentioned that he and renowned consequentialist Shelly Kagan were "always very friendly colleagues at Yale". He has claimed that contemporary virtue ethics has "added another valuable perspective", and traced this to G.E.M. Anscombe's "rather incendiary article" Modern Moral Philosophy.

He has raised doubts over whether moral intuitions are credible data in moral epistemology, and raised especial objections to the use of "trolley problems" in ethical theory. Furthermore, Wood's objections can be understood as equally indicting the work of moral psychologists such as Joshua Greene and Jonathan Haidt whenever their work depends upon such trolley problems.

Wood has suggested that "all ethical theories are uncertain, questionable, and not apt for justified belief", suggesting that foundational principles for ethics (such as those developed by Kant) remain useful because they allow people with different viewpoints to frame their arguments cogently. He has suggested that basic ethical values, such as human flourishing and the dignity of human persons, "have a role to play in helping people to think better about the terribly problematic situations that face us."

In his keynote address to the Cape Town University Law School in 2007, Wood compared Kant's realm of ends to the African ideal of ubuntu, suggesting that although the two ideas were not the same "I do think they represent very much the same response to the human condition, as manifested in different cultural and historical conditions."

== Selected writings ==
=== Translations ===
- Hegel, Georg Wilhelm Fredrich (1991). Wood, Allen W. (ed.). Hegel: Elements of the Philosophy of Right. doi:10.1017/CBO9780511808012. ISBN 978-0-521-34438-8.

=== Authored books ===
- Kant's Moral Religion, Ithaca, NY: Cornell University Press, 1970.
- Kant's Rational Theology, Ithaca, NY: Cornell University Press, 1978.
- Karl Marx, London: Routledge and Kegan Paul, 1981.
- Hegel's Ethical Thought, Cambridge: Cambridge University Press, 1990.
- Kant's Ethical Thought, Cambridge: Cambridge University Press, 1999.
- Unsettling Obligations: Essays on Reason, Reality and the Ethics of Belief, Stanford, CA: CSLI Publications, 2002.
- Immanuel Kant: Grundlegung zur Metaphysik der Sitten: Ein einführender Kommentar (with Dieter Schönecker), Paderborn, Germany: Schöningh-Verlag (UTB Wissenschaft), 2002
- Kant (Blackwell Great Minds), Hoboken, NJ: Wiley Blackwell, 2004
- Karl Marx (expanded second edition), London: Taylor and Francis, 2004.
- Kantian Ethics, Cambridge: Cambridge University Press, 2007.
- The Free Development of Each: Studies in Freedom, Right and Ethics in Classical German Philosophy, Oxford: Oxford University Press, 2014.
- Kant's Groundwork for the Metaphysics of Morals: A Commentary (with Dieter Schönecker), Cambridge, MA: Harvard University Press, 2014.
- Fichte's Ethical Thought, Oxford: Oxford University Press, 2016.
- Kant and Religion, Cambridge: Cambridge University Press, 2020.

=== Edited books ===
- Self and Nature in Kant's Philosophy, Ithaca, NY: Cornell University Press, 1984
- Hegel, G.W.F. Elements of the Philosophy of Right, ed. Allen W. Wood, trans. H.B. Nisbet, Cambridge: Cambridge University Press, 1991
- Kant, Immanuel. Groundwork for the metaphysics of morals, trans. Allen W. Wood, with essays by J.B. Schneewind (1930-), et al. New Haven: Yale University Press, 2002.
- Fichte, Johann Gottlieb, Attempt at a Critique of All Revelation, ed. Allen W. Wood, trans. Garrett Green, Cambridge: Cambridge University Press, 2010
- Cambridge History of Philosophy in the Nineteenth Century (1790-1870) (with Songsuk Susan Hahn), Cambridge: Cambridge University Press, 2012
- Cambridge Edition of Kant's Writings in English Translation, eds. Robert B. Louden, Allen W. Wood, Robert R. Clewis, G. Felicitas Munzel, 2013

=== Journal articles ===
- Wood, Allen W. (June 1998). "Kant on duties regarding nonrational nature". Proceedings of the Aristotelian Society, Supplementary Volumes. 72 (1): 189–210. doi:10.1111/1467-8349.00042. JSTOR 4107017.
- Wood, Allen W. (Spring 1991). "Unsociable Sociability: The Anthropological Basis of Kantian Ethics". Philosophical Topics. 19 (1): 325–351. doi:10.5840/philtopics199119122. JSTOR 43154098.
