= Metaphysics of Morals =

1797 work on morals and politics by Immanuel Kant

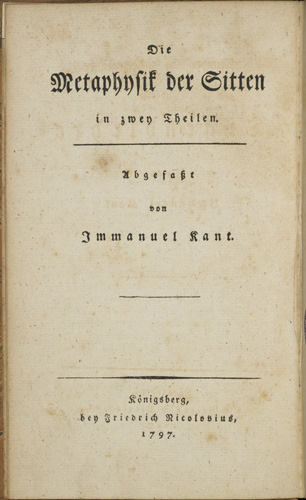
- Cover of the first edition
- Author: Immanuel Kant
- Original title: Die Metaphysik der Sitten
- Translator: Mary J. Gregor
- Language: German
- Subject: Ethics, Political philosophy
- Published: 1797
- Publisher: F. Nicolovius
- Publication place: Germany
- Media type: Print

The Metaphysics of Morals (German: Die Metaphysik der Sitten) is a 1797 work of political and moral philosophy by Immanuel Kant. It is also Kant's last major work in moral philosophy. The work is divided into two sections: the Doctrine of Right dealing with political rights, and the Doctrine of Virtue dealing with ethical virtues.

In this work, Kant develops the political and ethical philosophy for which the Groundwork and the Critique of Practical Reason provide the foundation.

The Doctrine of Right was first published separately around January 1797, and the Doctrine of Virtue in August of that year. Kant made a second edition with slight revisions in 1798, which include adding an appendix responding to a review of the Doctrine of Right by Friedrich Bouterwek.

== General Structure of the Work ==
The work is divided into two main parts, the Rechtslehre and the Tugendlehre. Mary J. Gregor's translation (1991) explains these German terms as, respectively, the Doctrine of Right, which deals with the rights that people have, and the Doctrine of Virtue, which deals with the virtues they ought to acquire. The Doctrine of Right also deals with required actions concerning the external relationships between people and the Doctrine of Virtue also deals with the internal requirements that characterize moral action and duty.

== Summary ==
The Doctrine of Right is grounded in republican interpretation of origins of political community as civil society and establishment of positive law. Published separately in 1797, the Doctrine of Right is one of the last examples of classical republicanism in political philosophy. It contains the most mature of Kant's statements on the peace project and a system of law to ensure individual and public rights. It expounds fundamental and coercively enforceable principles of external conduct between people, foremost among them being the universal principle of right which states:

Any action is right if it can coexist with everyone's freedom in accordance with a universal law, or if on its maxim the freedom of choice of each can coexist with everyone's freedom in accordance with a universal law.

Thus, according to Kant, the task of right is to bring the exercise of individual freedom into harmony with the freedom of everyone according to a universal law. The Doctrine of Right also discusses property rights (or rights to things), punitive justice, right of a state, well as right of nations and cosmopolitan right.

The right of a state concerns establishing a state and a rightful condition (viz., a condition or order in which the citizens can take part in and be secured their rights) in which the people guarantees the freedom and equality of all of the citizens. Kant explains that an indispensable prerequisite for the state to function in accordance with laws of freedom is the separation of powers or authorities into the sovereign, executive, and legislative.

Cosmopolitan right concerns the communal coexistence of people and nations for the prevention of wars.

The Doctrine of Virtue further develops Kant's ethical theory, which he had already laid the foundation in the Groundwork of the Metaphysics of Morals (1785) and the Critique of Practical Reason. It develops Kant’s conception of virtue and expositions of particular ethical duties we have as rational human beings. Kant particularly emphasizes treating humanity as an end in itself. The duties are analytically treated by Kant, who distinguishes duties towards ourselves from duties towards others. The duties are further classified as perfect duties and imperfect duties. Kant thinks imperfect duties allow a latitudo (or playroom), i.e., the possibility of choosing maxims. The perfect duties instead do not allow any latitudo. Kant uses this distinction in discussing some of the duties that were shown as examples in the Groundwork in more detail (viz., not lying, not committing suicide, cultivating one's talents, and being beneficent toward others). He also discusses particular duties that were not mentioned in the Groundwork such as the duties of gratitude, of beneficence and not being servile (falsely humble).

Thus, Kant distinguishes "Virtue" and "Right": the "Doctrine of Right" contains rights as perfect duties towards others only.

== Influence ==
In the English-speaking world, the Metaphysics of Morals (1797) is not as well known as Kant's earlier works, the Groundwork of the Metaphysics of Morals (1785) and the Critique of Practical Reason (1788), but it has experienced a renaissance through the pioneering work of Mary J. Gregor.

== English translations ==
Translations of the entire book:

- Kant, Immanuel (1991). The Metaphysics of Morals. Translated by Mary J. Gregor. Cambridge University Press. ISBN 0-521-30372-9 – via Internet Archive..
- Kant, Immanuel. The Metaphysics of Morals. Translated by Mary J. Gregor. Cambridge University Press, 1996. ISBN 0-521-56673-8.
- Kant, Immanuel. The Metaphysics of Morals. In Practical Philosophy. Edited by Mary J. Gregor. Cambridge University Press, 1996.
- Translated by Anonymous (John Richardson), "Metaphysic of Morals divided into Metaphysical Elements of Law and of Ethics." 2 vols. (London [Hamburg]: William Richardson, 1799).

Translations of Part I:

- Kant, Immanuel. The Philosophy of Law: An Exposition of the Fundamental Principles of Jurisprudence as the Science of Right. Translated by W. Hastie. Edinburgh: T. & T. Clark, 1887; reprinted by Augustus M. Kelly Publishers, Clifton, NJ, 1974. [introduction and all of part I]
- Kant, Immanuel. The Metaphysical Elements of Justice; Part I of the Metaphysics of Morals. 1st ed. Translated by John Ladd. Indianapolis: Bobbs-Merrill, 1965. [introduction and most of part I]
- Kant, Immanuel. The Metaphysics of Morals. In Kant: Political Writings. 2nd enl. ed. Edited by Hans Reiss. Translated by H. B. Nisbet. Cambridge: Cambridge University Press, 1991. [selections from part I]
- Kant, Immanuel. The Metaphysical Elements of Justice; Part I of the Metaphysics of Morals. 2nd ed. Translated by John Ladd. Indianapolis: Bobbs-Merrill, 1999. [introduction and all of part I]
- Kant, Immanuel. Metaphysics of Morals, Doctrine of Rights, Section 43-section 62. In Toward Perpetual Peace and Other Writings on Politics, Peace, and History. Edited by Pauline Kleingeld. Translated by David L. Colclasure. New Haven: Yale University Press, 2006. [selections from part I, concerning public right]

Translations of Part II:

- Kant, Immanuel, The Doctrine of Virtue. Translated by Mary J. Gregor. New York: Harper & Row Torchbooks, 1964; reprinted by the University of Pennsylvania Press, 1971.
- Translated by James Wesley Ellington, in Ethical Philosophy. Indianapolis: Hackett, 1983 [1964]. [Part II]
- Translated by John William Semple, "The Metaphysic of Ethics." Edinburgh: Thomas Clark, 1836; Reprint editions include 1871, ed. Henry Calderwood (Edinburgh: T. & T. Clark). [Introduction and portions of part II]

== See also ==
- 1797 in literature
- Anthropology
- Ethics
- Immanuel Kant bibliography
  - The Critique of Practical Reason
  - The Groundwork of the Metaphysics of Morals
  - Religion Within the Boundaries of Mere Reason
- Kantianism
- Philosophy of life
