= Inclination (ethics) =

Concept in ethics

Aristotle

Aristotle defined inclination in the first paragraph of Metaphysics with the statement "all men by their nature, desire to know." Thomas Aquinas proposed that humans have four natural inclinations - a natural inclination to preservation (life), an inclination to sexual reproduction (procreation), sociability, and knowledge. Inclination in the modern philosophy of ethics is viewed in the context of morality, or moral worth.

== History ==
The definition of inclination has varying definitions in philosophy. Aristotle "holds it to be the mark of a good person to take pleasure in moral action," or what one wants to do. Immanuel Kant made a study of whether inclination is of the highest moral worth, and objected to Aristotle's analysis, reasoning that "it is the person who acts from the motive of duty in the teeth of contrary inclination who shows an especially high degree of moral worth."

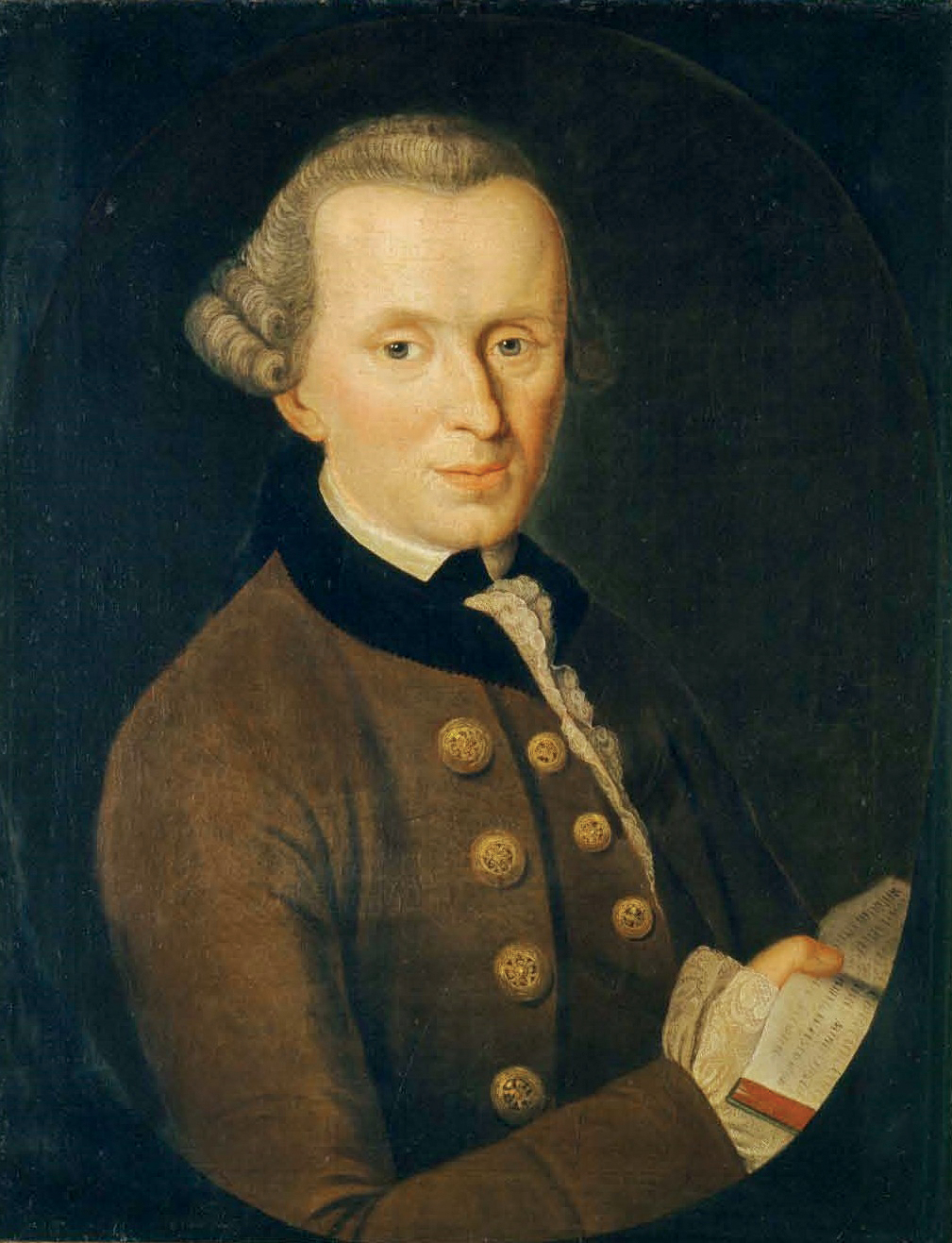
Immanuel Kant

=== The Shopkeeper ===
Kant posits the example of a shopkeeper who continually charges fair prices to customers in order to build good will and repeat business. If the shopkeeper continued that practice due to a mere inclination (to obtain repeat business) rather than sense of duty (higher principles of fairness and justice), though the shopkeeper's keeping the prices fair may conform with duty it has "no true moral worth." If instead the shopkeeper kept the prices fair solely out a duty to justice then he is acting simply from that duty. And in that case, in so doing Kant argues that the act now has "genuine moral worth."

But changing the facts of the example might lead to an altogether different conclusion. If instead the shopkeeper is nearly bankrupt and desperately needs money to feed his family, and still the shopkeeper keeps the prices fair less out of a sense of duty but rather a sense of pride (an inclination), then some may argue that it is more impressive to stay fair under those circumstances.

== Criticism ==
Kant argues that acting out of pure duty has the highest value, in that the visitor is doing the right thing for the right reason, because it is the right thing to do. It is not always clear whether inclination is morally more worthy than duty, or vice versa. For example, if following one's moral duty to always tell the truth has the highest value, then telling the truth (the location of a person) where it results in the murder of that person may show that following pure duty may not have the highest moral value.

But many criticisms of Kant do not take into account that he did not preclude other acts from having moral worth, instead Kant is said to have only valued acting from pure duty as having "true" or "authentic" moral worth. Philosophers tend to disagree on whether operating solely out of duty is always the most morally worthy thing to do, rather than operating via inclination.

=== The Hospital Visitor ===
One famous example illustrates the difference between inclination and duty while illustrating a criticism of it, as given by Michael Stocker in his paper The Schizophrenia of Modern Ethical Theories (1976).

[S]uppose you are in a hospital, recovering from a long illness. You are very bored and restless and at loose ends when Smith comes in once again. You are now convinced more than ever that he is a fine fellow and a real friend - taking so much time to cheer you up, traveling all the way across town, and so on. You are so effusive with your praise and thanks that he protests that he always tries to do what he thinks is his duty. . . . You at first think he is engaging in a polite form of self-deprecation, relieving the moral burden. But the more you two speak, the more clear it becomes that he was telling you the literal truth: that it is not essentially because of you that he came to see you, not because you are friends, but because he thought it his duty.

The visitor could be seen as lacking in moral merit. In other words, which scenario has more moral worth: one in which the friend goes to the hospital out of a cold sense of duty (what one should do) instead of wanting to do it (inclination)? Kant might argue that the former has the "true" or "authentic" moral worthiness where Stocker argues acting purely out of duty in his example is morally inauthentic.
