= Theoretical philosophy =

Branch of philosophy

The modern division of philosophy into theoretical philosophy and practical philosophy has its origin in Aristotle's categories of natural philosophy and moral philosophy. The one has theory for its object, and the other practice.

== Overview ==
In Denmark, Finland, Germany, the Netherlands, Sweden, and the United States, courses in theoretical and practical philosophy are taught separately, and are separate degrees. Other countries may use a similar scheme—some Scottish universities, for example, divide philosophy into logic, metaphysics, and ethics—but in most universities around the world philosophy is taught as a single subject. There is also a unified philosophy subject in some Swedish universities, such as Södertörns Högskola.

Theoretical philosophy is sometimes confused with analytic philosophy, but the latter is a philosophical movement, embracing certain ideas and methods but dealing with all philosophical subject matters, while the former is a way of sorting philosophical questions into two different categories in the context of a curriculum.

== Subjects of theoretical philosophy ==
- Epistemology
- Logic
- Philosophy of mathematics
- Philosophy of science
- Philosophy of language
- Philosophy of mind
- Metaphysics
  - Ontology
