= Pure practical reason =

Philosophical concept popularized by Immanuel Kant

Pure practical reason (German: reine praktische Vernunft) is reasoning that deals with what ought to be; namely, what actions we ought to do, appearing in Immanuel Kant's Critique of Practical Reason and Groundwork of the Metaphysics of Morals.

Being the opposite of impure (or sensibly-determined) practical reason, it is the reason that drives actions without any sense-dependent incentives. Human reasoning chooses such actions simply because those actions are good in themselves; this is the nature of good will, which Kant argues is the only concept that is good without any justification, it is good in itself and is a derivative of a transcendental law which affects the way humans practically reason (see practical philosophy). The possibility of pure practical reason is explored in the Critique of Practical Reason where he tackles the question of whether reason by itself, independently of empirical conditions, can be a source of knowledge about what we ought to do, or whether the knowledge about what we ought to do that is given by reason can only be empirically conditioned.

== External Links/Resources ==
- Kant’s Account of Reason, Stanford Encyclopedia of Philosophy
