= Manfred Kuehn =

American philosopher

- Born: August 19, 1947

Academic background
- Education: McGill University (PhD)

Academic work
- Discipline: Philosophy
- Institutions: Boston University

Manfred Kuehn (born August 19, 1947) is an American philosopher and Professor of Philosophy Emeritus at Boston University. He is known for his works on German philosophy. A festschrift in his honor titled Kant and the Scottish Enlightenment was published in 2018.

== Books ==
- Scottish Common Sense in Germany (McGill-Queen's University Press, 1988)
- Immanuel Kant, An International Anthology of Essays on Kant, 2 vols., edited with Heiner F. Klemme (Ashgate, 2000)
- Immanuel Kant, A Biography (Cambridge University Press, 2001, with translations into German, Spanish, Italian, Korean, Chinese, Russian and Bulgarian.)
- Kant-Biographien (Thoemmes, 2002)
