= Lara Denis =

American philosopher

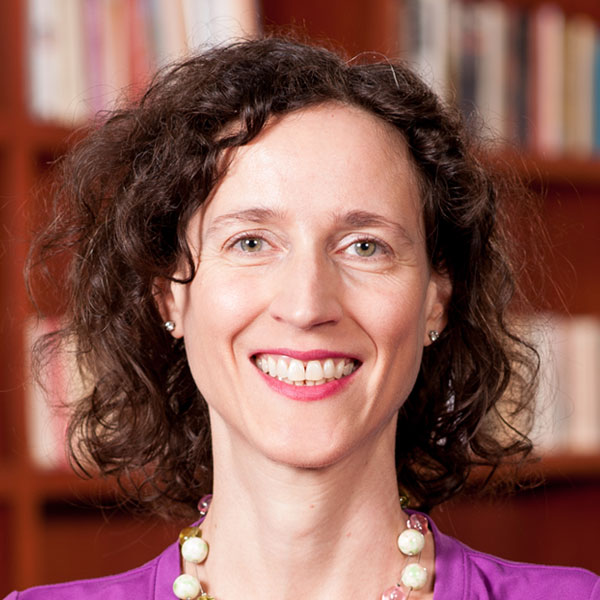
- Born: April 17, 1969 (age 57)

Education
- Education: Cornell University (PhD)
- Thesis: Moral Self-Regard: Duties to Oneself in Kant's Moral Theory (1996)

Philosophical work
- Era: 21st-century philosophy
- Region: Western philosophy
- Institutions: Agnes Scott College

Lara Denis (born April 17, 1969) is an American philosopher and Professor of Philosophy and Director of Ethics Program at Agnes Scott College. She is known for her works on Kantian ethics. Denis is a former President of Phi Beta Kappa (2007-2008).

== Books ==
- Kant’s Lectures on Ethics: A Critical Guide (Cambridge University Press, 2015), co-editor with Oliver Sensen
- Kant’s ‘Metaphysics of Morals’: A Critical Guide (Cambridge University Press, 2010) [editor]
- Kant’s Groundwork for the Metaphysics of Morals (Peterborough, Ontario: Broadview Press, 2005) [editor]
- Moral Self-Regard: Duties to Oneself in Kant’s Moral Theory (New York: Garland 2001), part of the Studies in Ethics series, edited by Robert Nozick
