= Mary J. Gregor =

American author, translator, and professor

Mary J. Gregor (January 1, 1928 – October 31, 1994) was an American author, translator, and professor.

She was a Kant scholar and professor emeritus of Philosophy at San Diego State University, best known for translating the works of the German philosopher Immanuel Kant.

Allen W. Wood has recognized her translations as characterized "not only by meticulous linguistic accuracy and scholarly erudition but also by an unfailing sense of style and an uncanny ability to render Kant's meaning into readable and even elegant English".

== Publications ==
- Gregor, Mary J. (1963). Laws of Freedom: A Study of Kant's Method of Applying the Categorical Imperative in the Metaphysik der Sitten. Oxford: Basil Blackwell – via Internet Archive.

=== Translations of Kant's work ===
- (1964) The Doctrine of Virtue.
- (1974) Anthropology from a Pragmatic Standpoint. ISBN 978-9024715855.
- (1979) The Conflict of the Faculties. ISBN 978-0803277755
- (1985) On the Philosopher's Medicine of the Body.
- Metaphysics of Morals. Cambridge: Cambridge University Press. 1991. ISBN 978-0521566735.
- Groundwork of the Metaphysics of Morals. Cambridge: Cambridge University Press. 1997. ISBN 978-0521626958.
