= Kingdom of Ends =

Part of the categorical imperative theory of Immanuel Kant

The Kingdom of Ends (German: Reich der Zwecke) is a part of the categorical imperative theory of Immanuel Kant. It is regularly discussed in relation to Kant's moral theory and its application to ethics and philosophy in general.

The kingdom of ends centers on the second and third formulations of the categorical imperative. These help form the basis for Kant's universalizing ethical theory for society. Kant introduced the concept in his Groundwork of the Metaphysics of Morals (4:439), considering a world in which all human beings are treated as ends (meaning treated as if they and their well-being are the goal), not as mere means to an end for other people.

== Overview ==
The Kingdom of Ends is a hypothetical state of existence that is derived from Kant's categorical imperative. A Kingdom of Ends is composed entirely of rational beings, whom Kant defines as those capable of moral deliberation (though his definition expands in other areas) who must choose to act by laws that imply an absolute necessity. It is from this point of view that they must judge themselves and their actions.

Though the term is usually translated as "Kingdom of Ends", the German word Reich is perhaps more appropriately translated as "realm". Kant uses it to mean the "systematic union of different rational beings under common laws." These common laws, established by the categorical imperative, are the gauge used to evaluate the worthiness of an individual's actions. When the kingdom's individuals live together by the categorical imperative—particularly Kant's second formulation of it—each one will treat all others as being ends in themselves, instead of mere means to achieving one's own pursuits. This systematic whole is the Kingdom of Ends.

People can only belong to the Kingdom of Ends when they become subject to these universal laws. Such rational beings must regard themselves simultaneously as sovereign when making laws, and as subject when obeying them. Morality, therefore, is acting out of reverence for all universal laws which make the Kingdom of Ends possible. In a true Kingdom of Ends, acting virtuously will be rewarded with happiness.

In his writings on religion, Kant interprets the Kingdom of God as a religious symbol for the moral reality of the Kingdom of Ends. As such, it is the ultimate goal of both religious and political organization of human society.

== See also ==
- Utopia
