= Hypothetical imperative =

Philosophical concept introduced by Immanuel Kant

A hypothetical imperative (German: hypothetischer Imperativ) is originally introduced in the philosophical writings of Immanuel Kant. This sort of imperative is contrasted with a categorical imperative.

== Overview ==
It is first mentioned in Section II of Groundworks of the Metaphysics of Morals. Kant defined it as the formula of the command of reason that represents an objective principle "in so far as it is necessitating for a will", in other words, imperatives act as the empirical formulas for knowing and enacting with reason. Hypothetical imperatives tell us how to act in order to achieve a specific goal and the commandment of reason applies only conditionally, e.g. "I must study to get a degree." To put it simply, a hypothetical imperative is the blueprint for the use of reason in the interest of achieving a goal.

These sorts of actions are capable of producing good, but they are primarily motivated by a desire to meet specific purposes. Actions done via Hypothetical Imperatives are done very often. Whenever one commits to perform an action in order to achieve something they desire, they have used this imperative to act with reason to their advantage.

In Groundworks of the Metaphysics of Morals, Kant divides hypothetical imperatives into two subcategories: the rules of skill and the counsels of prudence.

=== Rules of skill ===
The rules of skill are conditional and are specific to each and every person to which the skill is mandated by. These are particular ends that we assign ourselves, and they provide a framework to understand how our ends can be achieved. Kant summarizes it as, "Whoever wills the end also wills (in so far as reason has decisive influence on his actions) the indispensably necessary means to it that is in his control." Kant's definition provides that there are a countless number of personal ends that can exist, because each human being has their unique perspectives, desires, personal circumstances, and intended methods to reach their ends.

=== Counsels of prudence ===
The counsels of prudence (or rules of prudence) are attained a priori (unlike the rules of skill which are attained via experience, or a posteriori) and have universal goals such as happiness. Counsels of prudence are actions committed for the overall sake of good will for the individual, and with the best intentions. This assumes, then, that actions done with the best intentions are using the hypothetical imperative to discern and make decisions that are "most moral good". Thus, almost any moral "rule" about how to act is hypothetical, because it assumes that your goal is to be moral, or to be happy, or to please God, etc.

=== Limitations ===
The general limitation of the hypothetical imperative is ambiguity in its definition and how its scope should be viewed. There is a lack of clarity amongst interpreters of Kant as to what best captures the 'nature' of the hypothetical imperative. Generally speaking, this relates to a divide between a more narrow interpretation or a wider interpretation of the hypothetical imperative; with a wider scope detailing that we take necessary means to a given end, and a narrower scope instead stating we ought to take the necessary means to an end.

== See also ==
- Akrasia
