= Selfishness =

Concern for self above that of others

Selfishness is being concerned excessively or exclusively for oneself or one's own advantage, pleasure, or welfare, regardless of others. Selfishness is the opposite of altruism or selflessness, and has also been contrasted (as by C. S. Lewis) with self-centeredness.

== Divergent views ==
The implications of selfishness have inspired divergent views within religious, philosophical, psychological, economic, and evolutionary contexts. Some early examples of "selfist" thinking are the egoistic philosophies of Yangism in ancient China and of Cyrenaic hedonism in ancient Greece. Yangists followed the teachings of Yang Zhu and might have been influenced by Taoism. Cyrenaics, founded by Aristippus of Cyrene, were skeptics and materialists (but perhaps nominally Greek pagans). Thomas Hobbes, who could also be viewed as selfist, was a materialist but also advocated loyalty to a strong government and state church. The views of Friedrich Nietzsche and Max Stirner provide a more proximate link to the modern selfists.

=== Classical ===
Aristotle joined a perceived majority of his countrymen in condemning those who sought only to profit themselves; but he approved the man of reason who sought to gain for himself the greatest share of that which deserved social praise.

Seneca proposed a cultivation of the self within a wider community—a care for the self which he opposed to mere selfishness in a theme that would later be taken up by Foucault.

=== Medieval/Renaissance ===
Selfishness was viewed in the Western Christian tradition as a central vice—as standing at the roots of the seven deadly sins in the form of pride.

Francis Bacon carried forward this tradition when he characterized “Wisdom for a man's self...[a]s the wisdom of rats”.

=== Modern ===
With the emergence of a commercial society, Bernard Mandeville proposed the paradox that social and economic advance depended on private vices—on what he called the sordidness of selfishness.

Adam Smith with the concept of the invisible hand saw the economic system as usefully channelling selfish self-interest to wider ends. John Locke, along with Adam Smith, was a key figure in early classical liberalism: an ideology that champions notions of individualism and negative liberty. These core themes inevitably relate to the concept of selfishness. Locke, for example, sought for people to exercise "self-government"—the idea that an individual should make his/her own decisions. This inherent right would allow individuals to pursue self-interests, rather than suffer the burdens of any altruistic obligations. Thus, unlike political ideologies such as socialism, Locke and other classical liberals believe that selfishness is engrained in human nature. Locke arguably opened the door for later thinkers like Ayn Rand to argue for selfishness as a social virtue and the root of social progress. Ayn Rand held that selfishness is a virtue.

Roman Catholic philosopher Jacques Maritain opposed the latter view by way of the Aristotelian argument that framing the fundamental question of politics as a choice between altruism and selfishness is a basic and harmful mistake of modern states. Rather, cooperation ought to be the norm: human beings are by nature social animals, and so individual persons can only find their full good in and through pursuing the good of the community.

=== Ecology ===
In ecology, species sometimes would cooperate each other, which could be considered as a mutualistic behavior. But species choose to have mutualistic behaviors, because the mutualistic behaviors could provide them more benefits to fit in the environment, which ultimately is a selfishness behavior. For example, animal cooperation exists in wild dogs community. They hunt together for large mammals easier. During the hunting, each individuals would have specific roles, like chase the prey toward a cliff and make other individuals easy to hunt.

In Charles Darwin's theory of biological evolution, species understand the intensity of competition in nature, which requires a degree of selfishness in order to gain limited resources and survive to reproduce.

== Psychology ==
Lack of empathy has been seen as one of the roots of selfishness, extending as far as the cold manipulation of the psychopath.

The contrast between self-affirmation and selfishness has become a conflictual arena in which the respective claims of individual/community are often played out between parents and children or men and women, for example.

Psychoanalysts favor the development of a genuine sense of self, and may even speak of a healthy selfishness, as opposed to the self-occlusion of what Anna Freud called "emotional surrender".

== Criminology ==
Self-centeredness was marked as a key feature in a phenomenological theory of criminality named "The Criminal Spin" model. Accordingly, in most criminal behaviors there is a heightened state of self-centeredness, that differently manifests itself in different situations and in different forms of criminality.

== See also ==
- Ethical egoism
- Egotism
- Enlightened self-interest
- Ethic of reciprocity (the "Golden Rule")
- Game theory (selfish and cooperative strategies)
- Generosity
- Hedonism
- Human Potential Movement
- Individualism
- Individualist anarchism
- Narcissism
- Nietzsche
- Objectivism
- Philosophy of Friedrich Nietzsche
- Philosophy of Max Stirner
- Psychological egoism
- Rational egoism
- Secular humanism
- Self-serving bias
- The Selfish Gene
- Thelema
