= Paradox of hedonism =

Philosophical paradox about pleasure-seeking

The paradox of hedonism, also called the pleasure paradox, refers to the practical difficulties encountered in the pursuit of pleasure. For the hedonist, constant pleasure-seeking may not yield the most actual pleasure or happiness in the long term when consciously pursuing pleasure interferes with experiencing it.

The term "paradox of hedonism" was coined by utilitarian philosopher Henry Sidgwick in The Methods of Ethics. Variations appear in the realms of philosophy, psychology, and economics.

== Quotations ==
Failing to attain pleasures while deliberately seeking them has been variously described:

But I now thought that this end [one's happiness] was only to be attained by not making it the direct end. Those only are happy (I thought) who have their minds fixed on some object other than their own happiness[...] Aiming thus at something else, they find happiness along the way[...] Ask yourself whether you are happy, and you cease to be so.

— John Stuart Mill, Autobiography (1909)

Happiness cannot be pursued; it must ensue, and it only does so as the unintended side effect of one's personal dedication to a cause greater than oneself or as the by-product of one's surrender to a person other than oneself. The more a man tries to demonstrate his sexual potency or a woman her ability to experience orgasm, the less they are able to succeed. Pleasure is, and must remain, a side-effect or by-product, and is destroyed and spoiled to the degree to which it is made a goal in itself.

— Viktor Frankl, Man's Search for Meaning

Happiness is like a cat, if you try to coax it or call it, it will avoid you; it will never come. But if you pay no attention to it and go about your business, you'll find it rubbing against your legs and jumping into your lap.

— William Bennett

== Suggested explanations ==
When one aims solely towards pleasure itself, one's aim may be frustrated. Henry Sidgwick comments on such frustration after a discussion of self-love in the above-mentioned work:

I should not, however, infer from this that the pursuit of pleasure is necessarily self-defeating and futile; but merely that the principle of Egoistic Hedonism, when applied with a due knowledge of the laws of human nature, is practically self-limiting; i.e., that a rational method of attaining the end at which it aims requires that we should to some extent put it out of sight and not directly aim at it.

While not addressing the paradox directly, Aristotle commented on the futility of pursuing pleasure.

Additionally one may argue that this paradox only effectively counters hedonists like the Cyrenaics, who put the highest value on present and sensual pleasures, rather than others like Epicurus who put more value on the absence of pain, mental pleasures and pains over bodily ones, limiting of desires, and more concern with past and future pleasures and pains throughout one’s life.

Sooner or later, finite beings will be unable to acquire and expend the resources necessary to maintain their sole goal of pleasure; thus, they find themselves in the company of misery. Evolutionary theory explains that humans evolved through natural selection and follow genetic imperatives that seek to maximize reproduction, not happiness. According to David Pearce, the extent of human happiness is limited biologically by a genetically determined baseline level of well-being that cannot be permanently altered through environmental improvements alone. He argues in his treatise The Hedonistic Imperative that humans might be able to use genetic engineering, nanotechnology, and neuroscience to eliminate suffering in all human life and allow for peak levels of happiness and pleasure that are currently unimaginable.

Competing philosophies seek to balance hedonism with good acts and intentions, thus "earning" the pleasure.

== See also ==
- Altruism
- Anti-consumerism
- Cognitive dissonance
- Crab mentality
- Dukkha
- Easterlin paradox
- False pleasure
- Hedonic treadmill
- Intrinsic value
- Negative hedonism
- Leisure satisfaction
- Psychological egoism
- Rat race
- Tantalus
- Taṇhā
- Willpower paradox
- Wireheading
