= Bart Schultz =

American philosopher (born 1951)

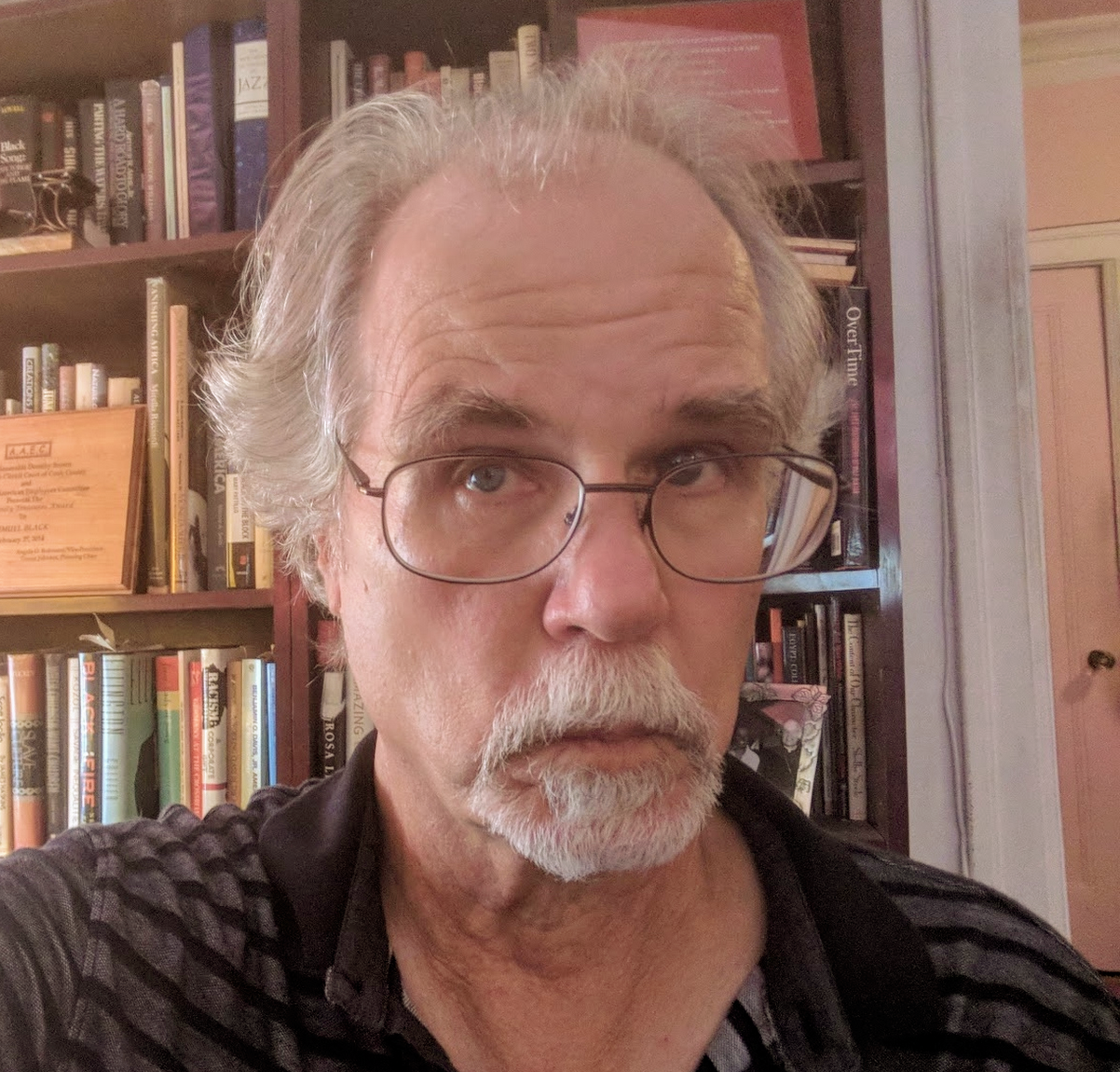
- Bart Schultz, Chicago, August 2018
- Born: Reynolds Barton Schultz; August 9, 1951 (age 75)

Education
- Education: University of Chicago

Philosophical work
- Era: Contemporary philosophy
- Region: Western philosophy
- School: Analytic philosophy · Utilitarianism
- Main interests: Ethics
- Website: https://www.bartschultz.com/

Bart Schultz (born August 9, 1951) is an American philosopher who was Senior Lecturer in Humanities (Philosophy), a faculty affiliate of the Center for the Study of Race, Politics, and Culture, and a Director of the Civic Knowledge Project at the University of Chicago.

== Career ==
Schultz taught in the college at the University of Chicago from 1987 until his retirement in 2025, having designed a wide range of core courses as well as courses on Teaching Precollegiate Philosophy, Consequentialism from Bentham to Singer, Philosophy and Public Education, The Philosophy of Poverty, John Dewey, The Chicago School of Philosophy, Political Philosophy, Philosophy of Education, Philosophies of Environmentalism and Sustainability, Philosophy of Happiness, and Ecocentrism and Environmental Racism.

He has published widely in Philosophy. He is a contributing editor to Essays on Henry Sidgwick (Cambridge, 1992), Utilitarianism and Empire (Lexington, 2005), with G. Varouxakis, Proceedings of the World Congress--University of Catania on H. Sidgwick: Happiness and Religion (Catania: Universita degli Studi di Catania, 2007), with P. Bucolo and R. Crisp, Proceedings of the World Congress--University of Catania on H. Sidgwick II: Ethics, Psychics, and Politics (Catania: Universita degli Studi di Catania, 2011), with P. Bucolo and R. Crisp, and various journal symposia, including the Book Symposium on Katarzyna de Lazari-Radek and Peter Singer, The Point of View of the Universe: Sidgwick and Contemporary Ethics (Etica & Politica, Vol. XVIII, No. 1 (Trieste: University of Trieste, April 2016)), with original contributions by Roger Crisp, Brad Hooker, Derek Parfit, and Mariko Nakano, and replies by Katarzyna de Lazari-Radek and Peter Singer. Schultz's major books are Henry Sidgwick, Eye of the Universe (Cambridge, 2004),The Happiness Philosophers: The Lives and Works of the Great Utilitarians (Princeton, 2017) and Utilitarianism as a Way of Life: Re-envisioning Planetary Happiness (Polity Books, 2024).

In 2004 Henry Sidgwick: Eye of the Universe won the American Philosophical Society's Jacques Barzun Prize in Cultural History, and in 2024 Schultz delivered "The Methods of Ethics as Prolegomenon: The Long, Strange Trip of Henry Sidgwick,” the opening Plenary Address to the Conference of the International Society for Utilitarian Studies, ISUS 2024, University College London, a conference celebrating the 150th anniversary of the publication of Sidgwick's The Methods of Ethics.

He has also written and lectured on the philosophies of Barack Obama, Martin Luther King Jr., and Timuel D. Black, and on the politics of race.

Through the Civic Knowledge Project (CKP), Schultz has developed a number of public ethics/humanities programs to provide opportunities for University of Chicago students, staff, and faculty to get involved with the larger South Side community in Chicago. For a select history of his work with the CKP, see his "The New Chicago School of Philosophy" (Rounded Globe, November 15, 2015). He developed the CKP's Winning Words precollegiate philosophy program, which won the 2012 American Philosophical Association's PDC Prize for Excellence and Innovation in Philosophy Programs In 2013, he was honored with the PUSH Excel Outstanding Educator Award by the Rainbow PUSH Coalition, and he subsequently developed, with the Rainbow PUSH Coalition, an educational program called the Dr. Martin Luther King Jr. Initiative, along with other collaborative programs, such as the "Chicago as Sacred Ground" pedagogical package.

Schultz is on the editorial board of Utilitas, the leading professional journal of utilitarian studies, and served as a founding member of the Board of Directors of PLATO (Philosophy Learning and Teaching Organization), the main professional group in the U.S. devoted to precollegiate philosophy.

Schultz's philosophical work spans utilitarian ethics, the history of philosophy, environmentalism, and race politics. He has been deeply influenced by such figures as John Rawls, J.B. Schneewind, Martha Nussbaum, Alan Donagan, Richard Rorty, Derek Parfit, Peter Singer, Edward Said, Roger Crisp, Dale Jamieson, Elizabeth S. Anderson, Danielle Allen, Robin Wall Kimmerer and Timuel Black, as well as by the scholarly work of the Bentham Project at University College London. Best known for his work on the 19th-century philosopher Henry Sidgwick, Schultz aims to expand the range of interpretive questions philosophers should consider; his work on the history of philosophy seeks both a deeper historical/critical understanding through the examination of both the lives and the works of such philosophers as Sidgwick, and a candid confrontation with the racism, sexism, and patterns of exclusion that have characterized philosophy both past and present. He claims that this type of historical approach can help unmask the limitations of some popular current forms of academic philosophy. His blog post "On Not Seeing in Philosophy" (September 29, 2016) is suggestive of the critical perspective characteristic of his work Partly for such reasons, and because of his work in environmental philosophy, he has over the last three decades moved steadily away from the more Rawlsian and neo-Kantian frameworks that he was initially drawn to, in the direction of certain forms of consequentialism more characteristic of a Sidgwickian perspective, but with a greater emphasis on environmental issues and matters of anti-racism, decolonization, and ecological justice.

== Books ==
- Henry Sidgwick, Eye of the Universe, Cambridge University Press, 2004
- The Happiness Philosophers: The Lives and Works of the Great Utilitarians, Princeton University Press, 2017
- Utilitarianism as a Way of Life: Re-envisioning Planetary Happiness, Polity Books, 2024

== See also ==
- Utilitarianism
