= Rational egoism =

Principle that an action is rational if it maximizes one's self-interest

Rational egoism (also called rational selfishness) is the principle that an action is rational if and only if it maximizes one's self-interest. As such, it is considered a normative form of egoism, though historically it has been associated with both positive and normative forms. In its strong form, rational egoism holds that to not pursue one's own interest is unequivocally irrational. Its weaker form, however, holds that while it is rational to pursue self-interest, failing to pursue self-interest is not always irrational.

Originally an element of nihilist philosophy in Russia, it was later popularised in English-speaking countries by Russian-American author Ayn Rand.

== Origins ==
Rational egoism (Russian: разумный эгоизм) emerged as the dominant social philosophy of the Russian nihilist movement, having developed in the works of nihilist philosophers Nikolay Chernyshevsky and Dmitry Pisarev. However, their terminology was largely obfuscated to avoid government censorship and the name rational egoism explicitly is unmentioned in the writings of both philosophers. Rational egoism was further embodied in Chernyshevsky's 1863 novel What Is to Be Done?, and was criticised in response by Fyodor Dostoyevsky in his 1864 work Notes from Underground. For Chernyshevsky, rational egoism served as the basis for the socialist development of human society.

English philosopher Henry Sidgwick discussed rational egoism in his book The Methods of Ethics, first published in 1872. A method of ethics is "any rational procedure by which we determine what individual human beings 'ought'—or what it is 'right' for them—to do, or seek to realize by voluntary action". Sidgwick considers three such procedures, namely, rational egoism, dogmatic intuitionism, and utilitarianism. Rational egoism is the view that, if rational, "an agent regards quantity of consequent pleasure and pain to himself alone important in choosing between alternatives of action; and seeks always the greatest attainable surplus of pleasure over pain".

Sidgwick found it difficult to find any persuasive reason for preferring rational egoism over utilitarianism. Although utilitarianism can be provided with a rational basis and reconciled with the morality of common sense, rational egoism appears to be an equally plausible doctrine regarding what we have most reason to do. Thus we must "admit an ultimate and fundamental contradiction in our apparent intuitions of what is Reasonable in conduct; and from this admission it would seem to follow that the apparently intuitive operation of Practical Reason, manifested in these contradictory judgments, is after all illusory".

== Ayn Rand ==
The author and philosopher Ayn Rand also discusses a theory that she called rational egoism. She holds that it is both irrational and immoral to act against one's self-interest. Thus, her view is a conjunction of both rational egoism (in the standard sense) and ethical egoism, because according to Objectivist philosophy, egoism cannot be properly justified without an epistemology based on reason.

Her book The Virtue of Selfishness (1964) explains the concept of rational egoism in depth. According to Rand, a rational man holds his own life as his highest value, rationality as his highest virtue, and his happiness as the final purpose of his life.

Conversely, Rand was sharply critical of the ethical doctrine of altruism:

Do not confuse altruism with kindness, good will or respect for the rights of others. These are not primaries, but consequences, which, in fact, altruism makes impossible. The irreducible primary of altruism, the basic absolute is self-sacrifice—which means self-immolation, self-abnegation, self-denial self-destruction—which means the self as a standard of evil, the selfless as a standard of the good. Do not hide behind such superficialities as whether you should or should not give a dime to a beggar. This is not the issue. The issue is whether you do or do not have the right to exist without giving him that dime. The issue is whether you must keep buying your life, dime by dime, from any beggar who might choose to approach you. The issue is whether the need of others is the first mortgage on your life and the moral purpose of your existence. The issue is whether man is to be regarded as a sacrificial animal. Any man of self-esteem will answer: No. Altruism says: Yes.

== Criticism ==
Two objections to rational egoism are given by the English philosopher Derek Parfit, who discusses the theory at length in Reasons and Persons (1984). First, from the rational egoist point of view, it is rational to contribute to a pension scheme now, even though this is detrimental to one's present interests (which are to spend the money now). But it seems equally reasonable to maximize one's interests now, given that one's reasons are not only relative to him, but to him as he is now (and not his future self, who is argued to be a "different" person). Parfit also argues that since the connections between the present mental state and the mental state of one's future self may decrease, it is not plausible to claim that one should be indifferent between one's present and future self.

== See also ==
- Cārvāka – Ancient school of Indian materialism
- Egoist anarchism – School of anarchist thought
- Enlightened self-interest – Ethical philosophy
- Hedonism – Family of views prioritizing pleasure
- Homo economicus – Model of humans as rational, self-interested agents
- Instrumental rationality – Philosophical terms
- Invisible hand – Concept in economics
- Practical reason – Use of reason to decide how to act
- Praxeology – Theory of human action
- Preference (economics) – Order by which an agent ranks alternatives based on their utility
- Prisoner's dilemma – Standard example in game theory
- Rational choice theory – Class of models in the behavioral sciences

== References and further reading ==
- Baier, Kurt (1990). "Egoism" in A Companion to Ethics. Peter Singer (ed.), Blackwell: Oxford.
- Brink, D. 1992, "Sidgwick and the Rationale for Rational Egoism," in Essays on Henry Sidgwick, ed. B. Schultz, Cambridge: Cambridge University Press.
- Gauthier, David (1986). Morals by Agreement. Oxford: Oxford University Press.
- Gert, Bernard (1998). Morality: Its Nature and Justification. Oxford University Press.
- Kagan, S., 1986, "The Present-Aim Theory of Rationality," Ethics 96: 746–59. JSTOR 2381097
- McKenzie, Alexander J. (2003). "Evolutionary Game Theory". The Stanford Encyclopedia of Philosophy (Summer Edition), Edward N. Zalta (ed.). link
- Moseley, Alexander (2006). "Egoism". The Internet Encyclopedia of Philosophy. J. Fieser & B. Dowden (eds.). link
- Mueller, D. (1989). Public Choice II. Cambridge, UK: Cambridge University Press.
- Parfit, D., 1984, Reasons and Persons, Oxford: Oxford University Press.
- Parfit, D., 1986, Reply to Kagan, Ethics, 96: 843–46, 868–69.
- Paul, E. & F. Miller & J. Paul (1997). Self-Interest. Cambridge University Press
- Shaver, Robert (1998). Rational Egoism: A Selective and Critical History. Cambridge University Press.
- Shaver, Robert (2002). "Egoism". The Stanford Encyclopedia of Philosophy (Winter Edition), Edward N. Zalta (ed.). link
- Sigwick, H., The Methods of Ethics. London, 1874, 7th ed. 1907.
- Smith, Tara (2006). Ayn Rand's Normative Ethics. Cambridge University Press.
- Sober, E. & D.S. Wilson (1998). Unto Others: The Evolution and Psychology of Unselfish Behavior. Harvard University Press.
