= Willpower paradox =

Idea of receiving better results through less direct focus

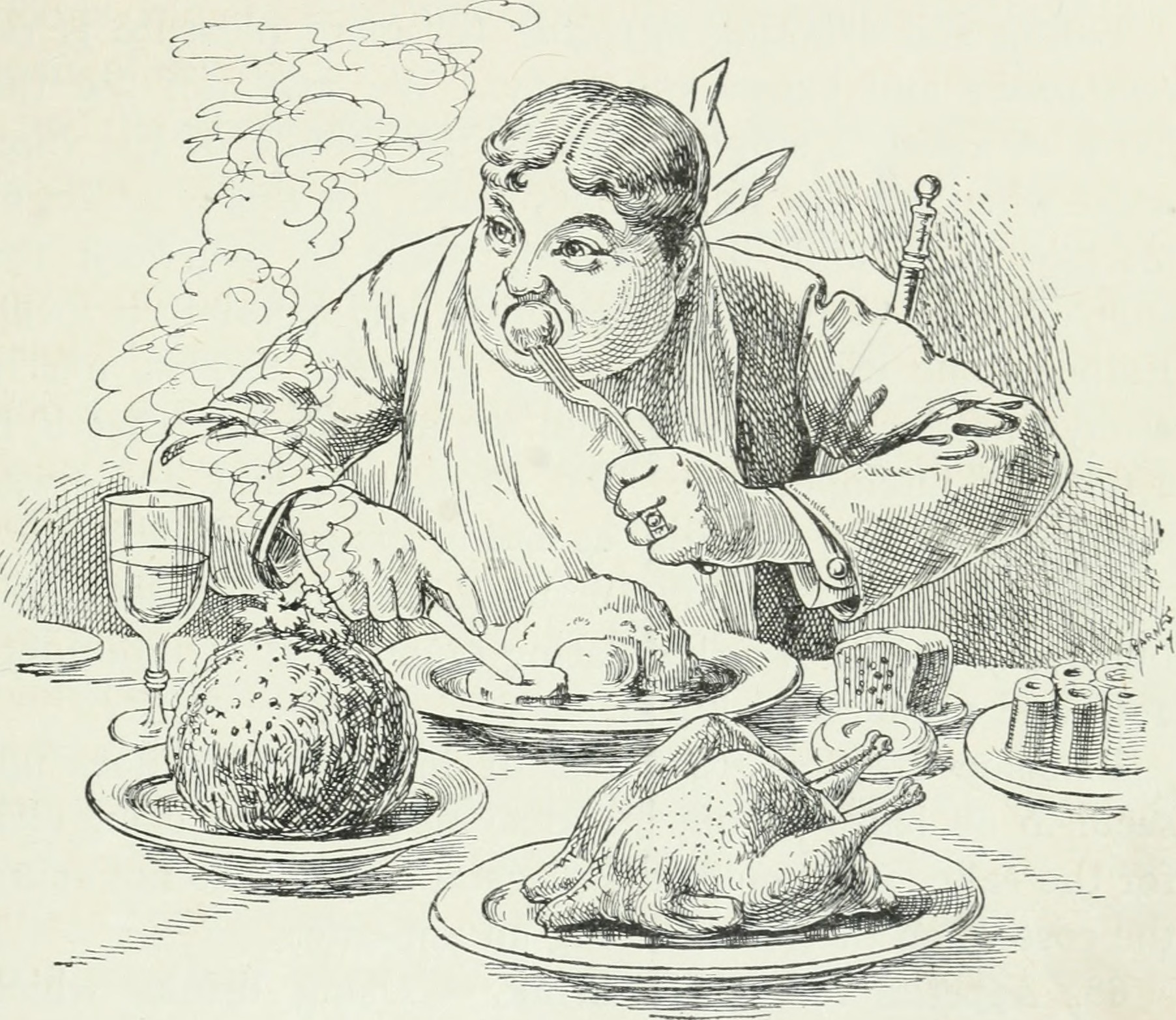
An 1897 illustration appears to depict a person struggling with a lack of willpower over food and drink consumption.

The willpower paradox is the idea that people may do things better by focusing less directly on doing them, implying that the direct exertion of volition may not always be the most powerful way to accomplish a goal. Research suggests that intrapersonal communication (talking to oneself) and maintaining a questioning mind are more likely to bring change.

== Experimental data ==
One 2010 experiment compared the performance of two groups of people doing anagrams. One group thought about their impending anagram task; the other thought about whether or not they would perform anagrams. The second group performed better than those who knew for sure that they would be working on anagrams. The same researcher, Ibrahim Senay (at University of Illinois in Urbana), found similarly that repeatedly writing the question "Will I?" was more powerful than writing the traditional affirmation "I will".

== Willpower and addiction ==
Michael J. Taleff writes, "Willpower in our field (psychology) is a paradox". Addiction-affected patients are told that willfulness is less effective than willingness.

== See also ==
- Paradox of hedonism
- Wu wei
