= Timuel Black =

American educator, civil rights activist, historian, and author (1918–2021)

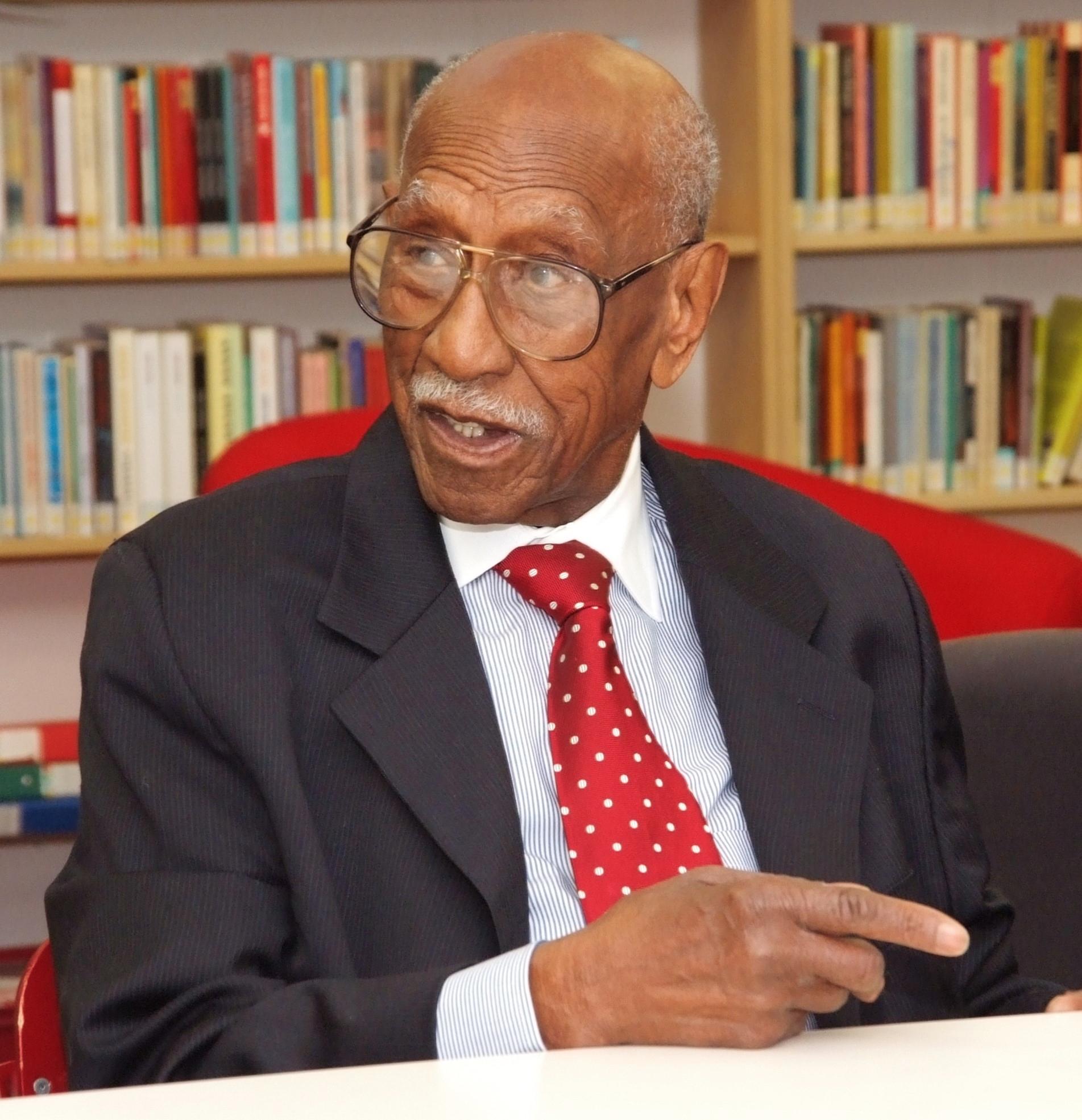
- Born: Timuel Dixon Black Jr. December 7, 1918; Birmingham, Alabama, U.S.
- Died: October 13, 2021 (aged 102); Chicago, Illinois, U.S.
- Education: Roosevelt University (BA); University of Chicago (MA)
- Spouses: Norisea Cummings (m. 1946; div. 1958) Ruby Battle (m. 1959; div. 1968) Zenobia Johnson (m. 1981)
- Children: 2

Timuel Dixon Black Jr. (December 7, 1918 – October 13, 2021) was an American educator, civil rights activist, historian and author. A native of Alabama, Black was raised in Chicago, Illinois, and studied the city's African-American history. He was active in the Civil Rights movement of the 1960s, most notably participating in Dr. Martin Luther King Jr.'s Chicago Freedom Movement during 1965 and 1966. Black was part of a coalition of Black Chicagoans that worked to elect Chicago's first African-American mayor, Harold Washington, in 1983, and he mentored a young Barack Obama, the future U.S. president, on building a political base on Chicago's South Side.

== Biography ==
=== Early life and family ===
Timuel Dixon Black Jr. was born on December 7, 1918, in Birmingham, Alabama. His great-grandparents were slaves and his grandparents were born as slaves and freed by the Emancipation Proclamation; his parents were sharecroppers. Black described his father, Timuel Dixon Black Sr., and mother, Mattie (née McConner), as having taken part in the Great Migration. In his memoir, Sacred Ground, Black writes that his parents "migrated twice". Their first move was "from tenant farms where they chopped cotton to the market town of Florence, Alabama, and then on from there to the city of Birmingham", where his "daddy worked for Bessemer Steel". His parents' second migration was to Chicago in order "to be able fight back against white attackers, to get better jobs and be able to vote, and to get a better education for their children."

=== Education and military service ===
Black grew up in Chicago's Bronzeville neighborhood. He attended Burke Elementary School, Englewood High School, Wendell Phillips Academy High School and later graduated from DuSable High School in June 1937. After high school, Black worked for Robert Cole’s Chicago Metropolitan Assurance Company; later leaving Chicago to work at Greenbaum Tannery in Milwaukee, Wisconsin. In 1952, Black graduated from Roosevelt University, where he earned a bachelor's degree, and he later earned a master's degree from the University of Chicago. Black served in World War II, and he received four Battle Stars, the Croix de Guerre, and the Legion of Honour.

=== Career ===
Black began his career as a teacher. After receiving his bachelor's degree, Black began working at Roosevelt High School in Gary, Indiana, in 1954. Black relocated back to Chicago in 1957 and began teaching at his alma mater, DuSable High School until 1959. Black also worked as a social worker.

During the 1960s, Black was president of the Negro American Labor Council (Chicago Chapter) and an organizer of Chicago participation in the 1963 March on Washington. During the 1963 Chicago municipal elections, Black unsuccessfully challenged Claude Holman, Chicago's 4th ward aldermen who was aligned with Mayor Richard J. Daley and with Chicago Public Schools superintendent Benjamin Willis.

In 1975, Black took a position to teach history, sociology and anthropology at Loop College, now Harold Washington College. In 1982, he approached Harold Washington, then a congressman, to run for mayor of Chicago. Black's organizing of support and likely voters helped convince Washington to make his successful mayoral bid.

Black was the named plaintiff in the lawsuit Black v. McGuffage. The suit claimed that the Illinois voting system discriminated against minorities in its use of faulty punch card ballots. Deployed in black and Hispanic neighborhoods in Chicago, the faulty ballots prevented residents from casting valid votes in the 2000 presidential election. After Black v. McGuffage, punch card ballots were eliminated and a uniform voting system was put in place. Black served on the board of Defending Rights & Dissent.

=== Tributes and legacy ===
In 2017, Senator Dick Durbin introduced a tribute to Black in the Congressional Record on the occasion of Black's receipt of Citizen Action Illinois' ninth annual Pauls Award, named for Paul Simon and Paul Wellstone, describing Black as "a decorated World War II veteran, an educator, author, labor leader, civil rights activist, and historian—and a bender of the moral arc of the universe. He is a visionary and—for me and so many others—a personal hero."

Sacred Ground is a memoir of interviews with Black about the African-American history of the South side of Chicago conducted by Susan Klonsky and edited by Bart Schultz was published in 2019. Black explained, "I'm here to personalize and transfer that history to younger people across all lines--race and gender."

=== Personal life and death ===
Black married three times and had two children. From 1946 until 1958, he was married to Norisea J. Cummings and together they had two children, Ermetra and Timuel Kerrigan Black. Black's second marriage was to Ruby P. Battle from 1959 to 1968. From 1981 until his death, Black was married to Zenobia Johnson. In 1954 he joined the First Unitarian Church of Chicago and was a member there until his death.

In October 2021, it was reported that Black was in hospice care at his Kenwood home in Chicago. Black died at his home in Chicago on October 13, 2021, from prostate cancer, at the age of 102.

Black's biography, 2019.

== Works ==
- Black, Timuel D. (2003). Bridges of Memory: Chicago's First Wave of Great Migration. Evanston, Illinois: Northwestern University Press. ISBN 9780810123151. OCLC 567296988.
- Black, Timuel D. (2007). Bridges of Memory: Chicago's Second Generation of Great Migration. Evanston, Illinois: Northwestern University Press. ISBN 9780810122956. OCLC 608033460.
- Black, Timuel D.; Klonsky, Susan (2019). Schultz, Eduard (ed.). Sacred Grounds: The Chicago Streets of Timuel Black as Told to Susan Klonsky. Evanston, Illinois: Northwestern University Press. ISBN 9780810139244. OCLC 1088790146.

== Sources ==
1. "Timuel D. Black, Jr. Papers," Chicago Public Library (link); OCLC 773740819
2. "Timuel Black papers, 1956–1973," Chicago History Museum; OCLC 718738158
