= Enlightened self-interest =

Ethical philosophy

Enlightened self-interest is a philosophy in ethics which states that persons who act to further the interests of others (or the interests of the group or groups to which they belong) ultimately serve their own self-interest.

It has often been simply expressed by the belief that an individual, group, or even a commercial entity will "do well by doing good".

The term enlightened self-interest has been criticized as a mere ideological or semantic device of neoclassical economic theory to justify this type of behavior. It has been considered at best a variant of self-interest that is unsuitable for the establishment of personal and public relations because - like the definition of self-interest in the standard rational-choice model - it fails to characterise human behaviour ethically, psychologically, and cognitively.

== Related and contrasting concepts ==
=== Unenlightened self-interest ===
In contrast to enlightened self-interest is simple greed, or the concept of "unenlightened self-interest", in which it is argued that when most or all persons act according to their own myopic selfishness, the group suffers loss as a result of conflict, decreased efficiency and productivity because of lack of cooperation, and the increased expense each individual pays for the protection of their own interests. If a typical individual in such a group is selected at random, it is not likely that this person will profit from such a group ethic.

Some individuals might profit, in a material sense, from a philosophy of greed, but it is believed by proponents of enlightened self-interest that these individuals constitute a small minority and that the large majority of persons can expect to experience a net personal loss from a philosophy of simple unenlightened selfishness.

Unenlightened self-interest can result in the tragedy of the commons.

=== Golden rule ===
Enlightened self-interest is related to the Golden Rule: simply acting toward all others the way one wants them to act toward oneself. The reasoning, for example, is "I will not steal because if I steal then others may steal from me and the creation of a thieving society will likely hurt me". It is also related to the second part of the Great Commandment, "Love your neighbor as yourself".

=== Deferred gratification ===
Enlightened self-interest also has implications for long-term benefits as opposed to short-term benefits to oneself. When an individual pursues enlightened self-interest that person may sacrifice short-term interests to maximize long-term interests. This is a form of deferred gratification.

An individual may choose to forsake pursuing immediate gratification by supporting and not interfering with others' pursuit of self-interest. An individual may have to sacrifice his immediate self-interest for the purpose of a positive relationship to a group of individuals to which he relates. For example, a merchant likely will maximize profit over the long term if they choose to be generous to their customers in a manner beyond the requirement of policy, say, in accepting returns and refunding the purchase price when not required to by explicit policy. By doing so, they may lose short-term gain but likely will eventually profit from increased business volume as they gain a reputation for being reasonable, honest, and generous.

=== Altruism ===
Enlightened self-interest is also different from altruism, which calls for people to act in the interest of others often at the expense of their own interests and with no expectation of material benefit for themselves in the future. Some advocates of enlightened self-interest might argue that pure altruism promotes inefficiency as well.

=== Rational selfishness ===
Rational selfishness is a term generally related to Ayn Rand's Objectivist philosophy, which refers to a person's efforts to look after their own well-being, to cultivate the self, and achieve goals for the good of the self. The focus in rational selfishness might be considered to be more self-directed (where the benefit to the group or society is a possible by-product) than the focus of enlightened self-interest which is more group-directed (and the benefit to oneself might be more of the by-product). Some authors say that this concept elevates egoism to the level of a moral principle.

== See also ==
- Adam Smith and the "invisible hand"
- Alexis de Tocqueville
- Aristotle and virtue ethics
- Behavioral economics
- Ethical egoism
- Friedrich Nietzsche and the "will to power"
- Helping behavior
- Give and take
- Identity politics
- Psychological egoism
- Reciprocal altruism
- The Selfish Gene (book)
- Thomas Hobbes
