= False pleasure =

False pleasure may be a pleasure based on a false belief, or a pleasure compared with more real, or greater pleasures. Lacan maintained that philosophers should seek to "discern not true pleasures from false, for such a distinction is impossible to make, but the true and false goods that pleasure points to".

When one is said to have experienced a false pleasure, it is distinct from feeling actual pleasure. Pleasure can be described as being false or true based on the content of where the pleasure comes from. When being faced with a situation where one holds a false belief that in turn makes them feel pleasure, this would be categorized as false pleasure. An example of this could be if someone gets pleasure from being in a happy relationship, yet they are unaware that the other person is cheating. Their pleasure then comes from a false belief—namely, the belief that the other person is faithful.

== Classical philosophy ==
Plato devoted much attention to the belief that "no pleasure save that of the wise is quite true and pure - all others are shadows only" - both in The Republic and in his late dialogue Philebus.

Augustine saw false pleasure as focused on the body, as well as pervading the dramatic and rhetorical entertainments of his time.

Plato describes false pleasure in two different ways. The first way is sometimes called the propositional sense of falsity. In this way of looking at falsity of pleasure, the truth value of the statement does not affect the fact that the statement is still a statement. The other way Plato uses falsity when looking at pleasure is in the alienans sense. When looking at falsity in this way we are explaining something as being "fake". In this use of the term falsity, the thing we are talking about is in question of existence.

== Asceticism ==
Buddhaghosa considered that "sense-pleasures are impermanent, deceptive, trivial...unstable, unreal, hollow, and uncertain" - a view echoed in most of what Max Weber termed "world-rejecting asceticism".

== Vain pleasure ==
A specific false pleasure often denounced in Western thought is the pleasure of vanity - Voltaire for example pillorying the character "corrupted by vanity...He breathed in nothing but false glory and false pleasures".

Similarly John Ruskin contrasted the adult's pursuit of the false pleasure of vanity with the way the child does not seek false pleasures; its pleasures are true, simple, and instinctive".

False pleasure is not to be confused with vain pleasure. The difference is that vain pleasure is when someone feels pleasure from something that others would find morally wrong for them to get pleasure from. Meanwhile, false pleasure is just based on false beliefs regardless of the moral outlook on the source of pleasure. An example of vain pleasure would be if a person found pleasure in finding out that someone they hate was tortured. This would only count as a false pleasure if the person was not indeed tortured.

== Sex ==
Sexual intercourse is sometimes seen as a true pleasure (or false one), contrasted with the less real pleasures of the past, as with Donne's "countrey pleasures, childishly".

In the wake of Reich, a distinction was sometimes made between reactive and genuine sexuality - analysis supposedly allowing people to "realize the enormous difference between what they once believed sexual pleasure to be and what they now experience".

== Mass media ==
Popular culture has been a central arena for latter-day disputes over true and false pleasures. Modernism saw attacks on the false pleasures of consumerism from the right, as well as from the left, with Herbert Marcuse denouncing the false pleasures of happy consciousness of "those whose life is the hell of the affluent society".

From another angle, Richard Hoggart contrasted the immediate, real pleasures of the working-class from the increasingly ersatz diet fed them by the media.

As the 20th Century wore on, however - while concern for the contrast of false and authentic pleasures, fragmented or integrated experiences, certainly remained - the mass media increasingly became less of a scapegoat for the prevalence of false pleasure, figures like Frederic Jameson for example insisting instead on "the false problem of value" in a world where "reification or materialization is a key structural feature of both modernism and mass culture".

== Žižek ==
Slavoj Žižek had added a further twist to the debate for the 21st century, arguing that in a postmodern age dominated by what he calls "the superego injunction to enjoy that permeates our discourse", the quest for pleasure has become more of a duty than a pleasure: for Žižek, "psychoanalysis is the only discipline in which you are allowed not to enjoy" !

== See also ==
- Acedia
- Cultural studies
- Hedonic treadmill
- Paradox of hedonism
