= Hedonism =

Family of views prioritizing pleasure

Different forms of hedonism address the role of pleasure in motivation, value, and morality.

Hedonism is a family of philosophical views that prioritize pleasure. Psychological hedonism is the theory that all human behavior is motivated by the desire to maximize pleasure and minimize pain. As a form of egoism, it suggests that people only help others if they expect a personal benefit. Axiological hedonism is the view that pleasure is the sole source of intrinsic value. It asserts that other things, like knowledge and money, only have value insofar as they produce pleasure and reduce pain. This view divides into quantitative hedonism, which only considers the intensity and duration of pleasures, and qualitative hedonism, which identifies quality as another relevant factor. The closely related position of prudential hedonism states that pleasure and pain are the only factors of well-being. Ethical hedonism applies axiological hedonism to morality, arguing that people have a moral duty to pursue pleasure and avoid pain. Utilitarian versions assert that the goal is to increase overall happiness for everyone, whereas egoistic versions state that each person should only pursue their own pleasure. Outside the academic context, hedonism is sometimes used as a pejorative term for an egoistic lifestyle seeking short-term gratification.

Hedonists typically understand pleasure and pain broadly to include any positive or negative experience. While traditionally seen as bodily sensations, some contemporary philosophers view them as attitudes of attraction or aversion toward objects or contents. Hedonists often use the term "happiness" for the balance of pleasure over pain. The subjective nature of these phenomena makes it difficult to measure this balance and compare it between different people. The paradox of hedonism and the hedonic treadmill are proposed psychological barriers to the hedonist goal of long-term happiness.

As one of the oldest philosophical theories, hedonism was discussed by the Cyrenaics and Epicureans in ancient Greece, the Charvaka school in ancient India, and Yangism in ancient China. It attracted less attention in the medieval period but became a central topic in the modern era with the rise of utilitarianism. Various criticisms of hedonism emerged in the 20th century, prompting its proponents to develop new versions to address these challenges. The concept of hedonism remains relevant to many fields, ranging from psychology and economics to animal ethics.

== Types ==
The term hedonism refers to a family of views about the role of pleasure. These views are often categorized into psychological, axiological, and ethical hedonism depending on whether they study the relation between pleasure and motivation, value, or right action, respectively. While these distinctions are common in contemporary philosophy, earlier philosophers did not always clearly differentiate between them and sometimes combined several views in their theories. The word hedonism derives from the Ancient Greek word ἡδονή (hēdonē), meaning 'pleasure'. Its earliest known use in the English language is from the 1850s.

=== Psychological hedonism ===
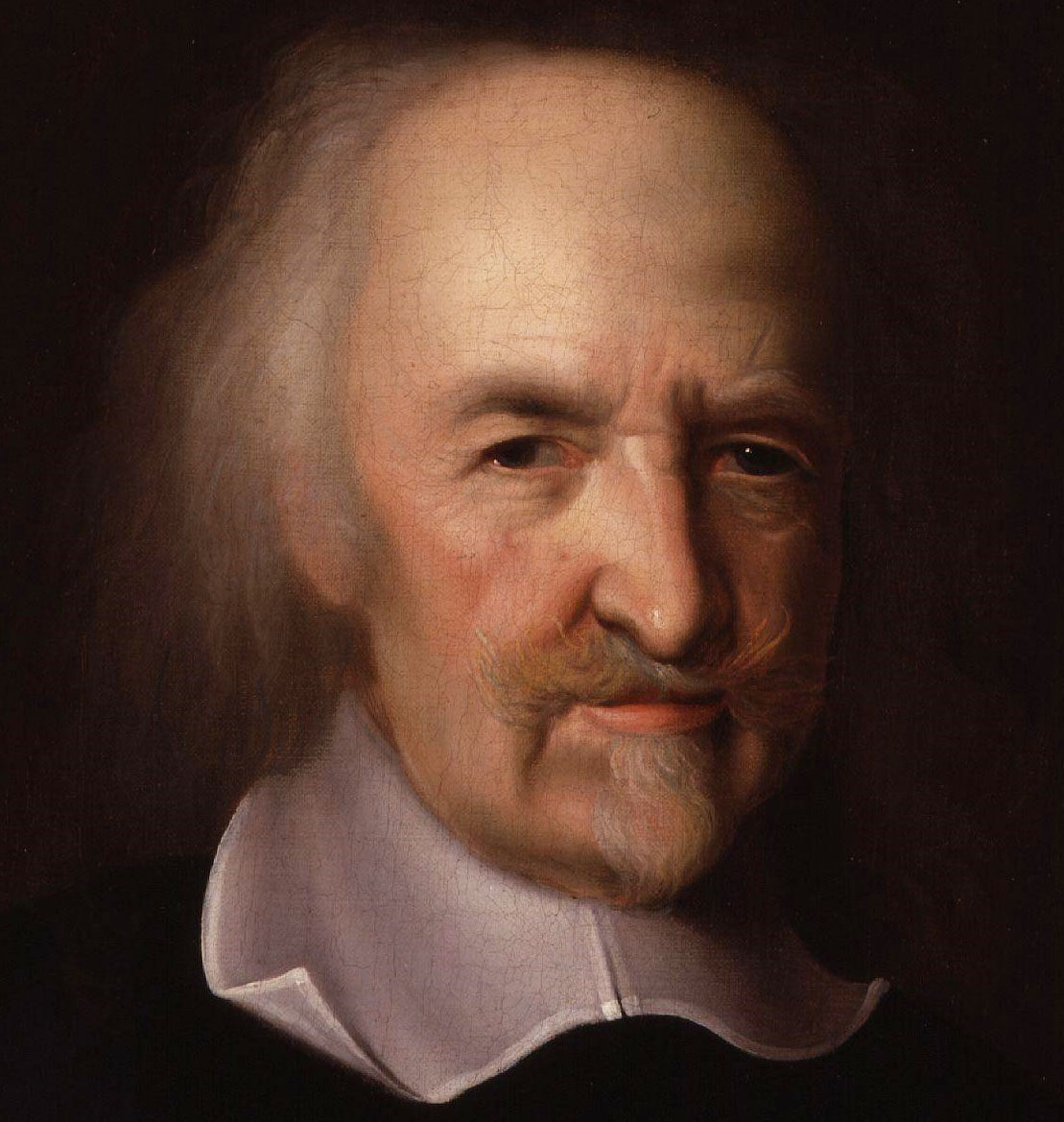
Thomas Hobbes was a key advocate of psychological hedonism.

Psychological or motivational hedonism is the view that all human actions aim at increasing pleasure and avoiding pain. It is an empirical view about what motivates people, both on the conscious and the unconscious levels. Psychological hedonism is usually understood as a form of egoism, meaning that people strive to increase their own happiness. This implies that a person is only motivated to help others if it is in their own interest because they expect a personal benefit from it. As a theory of human motivation, psychological hedonism does not claim that all behavior leads to pleasure. For example, if a person holds mistaken beliefs or lacks necessary skills, they may attempt to produce pleasure but fail to attain the intended outcome.

The standard form of psychological hedonism asserts that the pursuit of pleasure and the avoidance of pain are the only sources of all motivation. Some psychological hedonists propose less wide-reaching formulations, suggesting that considerations of pleasure and pain are not the only source of motivation, do not influence all actions, or are otherwise limited by certain conditions. For example, reflective or rationalizing hedonism says that human motivation is only driven by pleasure and pain when people actively reflect on the overall consequences. Another version is genetic hedonism, which accepts that people desire various things besides pleasure but asserts that each desire has its origin in a desire for pleasure. Darwinian hedonism explains the pleasure-seeking tendency from an evolutionary perspective, arguing that hedonistic impulses evolved as adaptive strategies to promote survival and reproductive success.

Proponents of psychological hedonism often highlight its intuitive appeal and explanatory power. They argue that many desires focus on pleasure directly, while others aim at pleasure indirectly by promoting its causes. A similar argument from behavioral psychology proposes that altruistic conduct is learned through conditioning, which reinforces behavior that leads to positive rewards. This view asserts that all primary motivation comes from selfish drives on which all secondary motivation, including altruism, depends. Critics of psychological hedonism often cite apparent counterexamples in which people act for reasons other than their personal pleasure. Proposed examples include acts of genuine altruism, such as a soldier sacrificing themselves on the battlefield to save their comrades or a parent wanting their children to be happy. Critics also mention non-altruistic cases, like a desire for posthumous fame. It is an open question to what extent these cases can be explained as types of pleasure-seeking behavior. Another criticism from evolutionary biology argues that altruistic motivation is conducive to survival and reproduction. It suggests that altruistic motivation produces some necessary behavior, like parental care, more reliably since it does not depend on additional mechanisms, such as the individual's belief that parental care leads to personal pleasure.

=== Axiological hedonism ===
According to quantitative hedonism, the value of an episode of pleasure only depends on its intensity and duration.

Axiological or evaluative hedonism is the view that pleasure is the ultimate source of all value. It states that things other than pleasure only have value insofar as they produce pleasure or reduce pain. This is typically explained through the distinction between intrinsic and instrumental value. An entity has intrinsic value if it is good in itself or if its worth does not depend on external factors; conversely, an entity has instrumental value if it leads to other good things. According to axiological hedonism, only pleasure is intrinsically valuable because it is good even when it produces no external benefit. Money, by contrast, is only instrumentally valuable because it can be used to acquire other good things but lacks value apart from these uses. The overall value of something depends on both its intrinsic and instrumental value. In some cases, even unpleasant experiences, like a painful surgery, can be good overall if their positive consequences, like preventing future pain, outweigh the present discomfort.

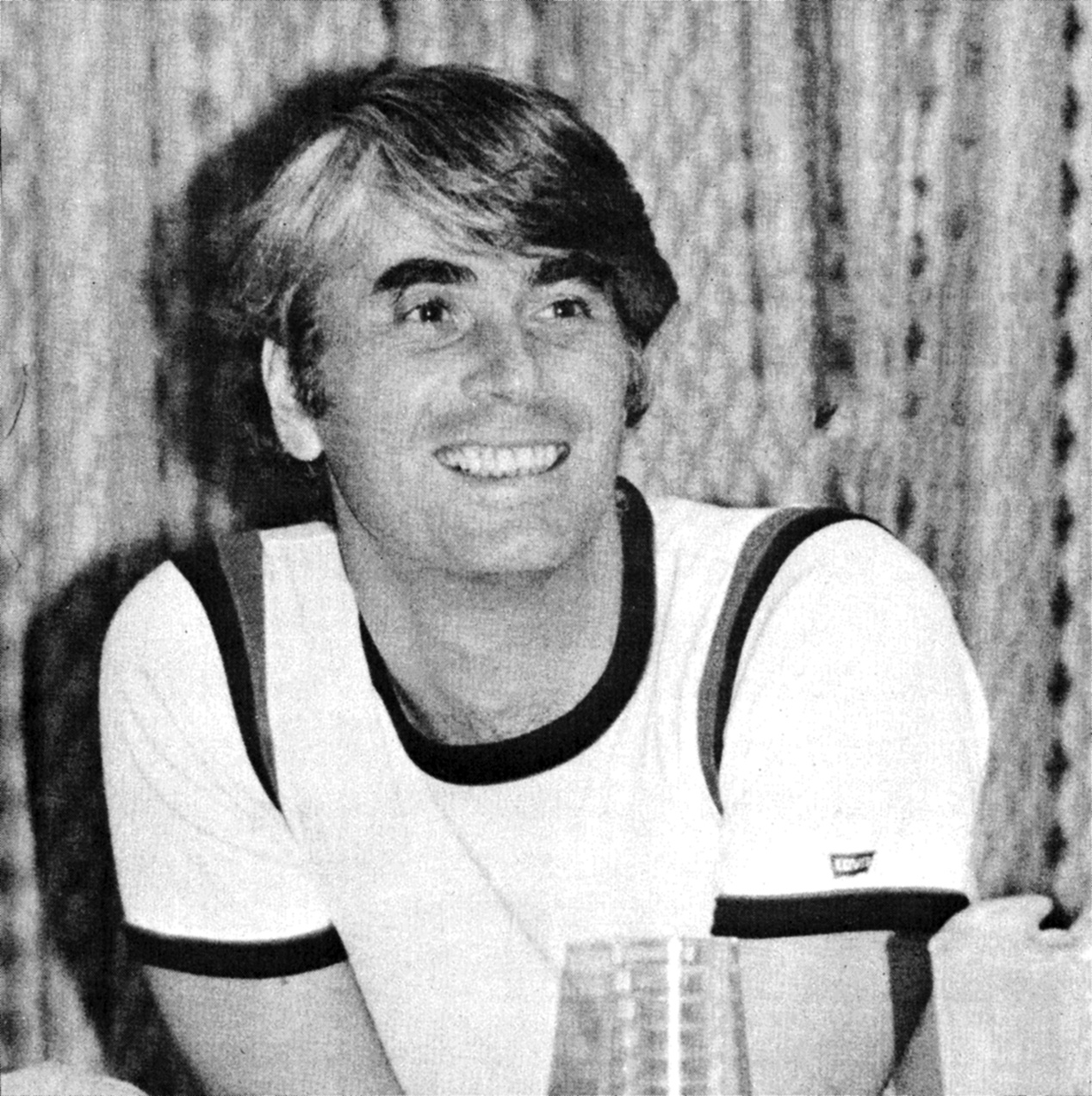
Robert Nozick criticized hedonism for not distinguishing between authentic and inauthentic pleasures.

According to quantitative hedonism, the intrinsic value of pleasure depends solely on its intensity and duration. Qualitative hedonists hold that the quality of pleasure is an additional factor. They argue, for instance, that subtle pleasures of the mind, like the enjoyment of fine art and philosophy, can be more valuable than simple bodily pleasures, like enjoying food and drink, even if their intensity is lower.

Prudential hedonism is closely related to axiological hedonism, focusing specifically on well-being or what is good for an individual. It states that pleasure and pain are the sole factors of well-being, meaning that how good a life is for a person only depends on its balance of pleasure over pain. Prudential hedonism allows for the possibility that things other than well-being have intrinsic value, such as beauty or freedom.

Diverse arguments for and against axiological hedonism have been proposed. Proponents often focus on the intuition that pleasure is valuable and the observation that people naturally desire pleasure for its own sake. A related approach acknowledges that people value things beyond pleasure, such as truth and beauty. It seeks to show that all other values have their source in the value of pleasure. Another argument assumes that the words good and pleasurable have the same meaning, implying that the pursuit of pleasure is inherently the pursuit of goodness.

The idea that most pleasures are valuable in some form is relatively uncontroversial. Critics usually focus on the stronger claim that all pleasures are valuable or that pleasure is the only source of intrinsic value. Some assert that certain pleasures are worthless or even bad, like disgraceful and sadistic pleasures. (Note: A more controversial objection asserts that all pleasures are bad.) A different criticism comes from value pluralists, who contend that other things besides pleasure have value. To support the idea that beauty is an additional source of value, G. E. Moore used a thought experiment involving two worlds: one exceedingly beautiful and the other a heap of filth. He argued that the beautiful world is better even if there is no one to enjoy it. Another influential thought experiment, proposed by Robert Nozick, involves an experience machine able to create artificial pleasures. Based on his contention that most people would not want to spend the rest of their lives in this type of pleasant illusion, he argued that hedonism cannot account for the values of authenticity and genuine experience. (Note: Another historically influential argument, first formulated by Socrates, suggests that a pleasurable life void of any higher cognitive processes, like the life of a happy oyster, is not the best form of life.)

=== Ethical hedonism ===
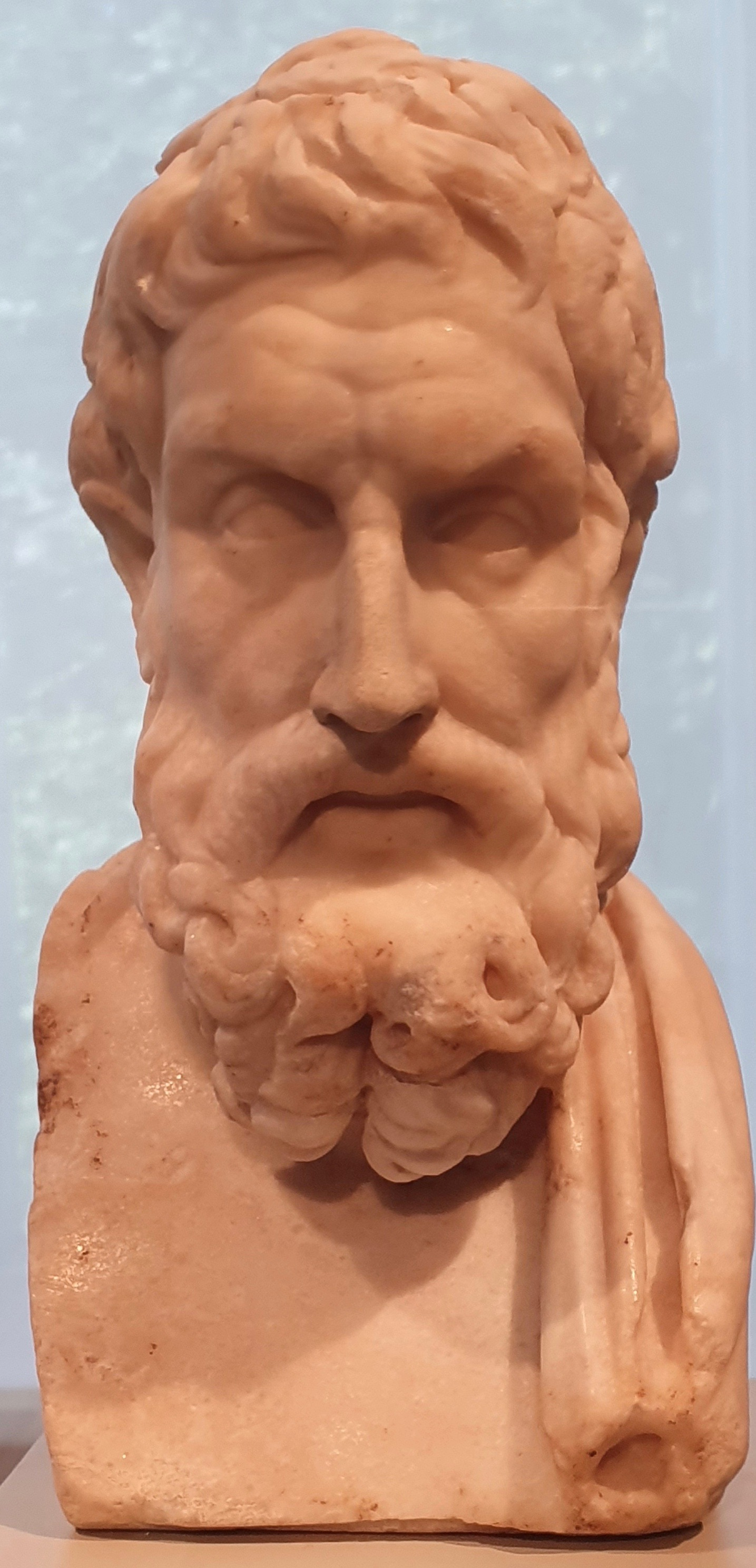
Epicurus developed a nuanced form of ethical hedonism, arguing that a tranquil state of mind cultivated through moderation leads to the greatest overall happiness.

Ethical or normative hedonism is the thesis that the pursuit of pleasure and the avoidance of pain are the highest moral principles of human behavior. (Note: Some definitions do not distinguish between ethical and axiological hedonism, and define ethical hedonism in terms of intrinsic values rather than right action.) It implies that other moral considerations, like duty, justice, or virtue, are relevant only to the extent that they influence pleasure and pain.

Theories of ethical hedonism can be divided into utilitarian and egoistic versions. Utilitarian hedonism, also called classical utilitarianism, asserts that everyone's happiness matters. It says that a person should maximize the sum total of happiness of everybody affected by their actions. This sum total includes the person's own happiness, but it is only one factor among many without any special preference compared to the happiness of others. As a result, utilitarian hedonism sometimes requires people to forego their own enjoyment to benefit others. For example, philosopher Peter Singer argues that good earners should donate a significant portion of their income to charities since this money can produce more happiness for people in need.

Egoistic hedonism says that each person should only pursue their own pleasure. According to this controversial view, a person only has a moral reason to care about the happiness of others if it impacts their own well-being. For example, if someone experiences unpleasant feelings, such as guilt, when harming others, then they have a reason to avoid causing harm. However, under this view, a person would be morally permitted—or even obliged—to harm others if doing so increases their own overall pleasure.

Ethical hedonism is often combined with consequentialism, which asserts that an act is right if it has the best consequences. It is typically paired with axiological hedonism, which links the intrinsic value of consequences to pleasure and pain. As a result, many arguments for and against axiological hedonism also apply to ethical hedonism. Additionally, proponents of utilitarian hedonism often emphasize its impartial nature, its simple and objective method for evaluating moral judgments, and its flexibility to apply to any situation. Critics frequently argue that utilitarian hedonism places too high demands on conduct and leads to injustice in some cases by sacrificing individual rights for the greater good. They also point to practical difficulties in assessing all pleasure-related consequences of actions.

=== Others ===
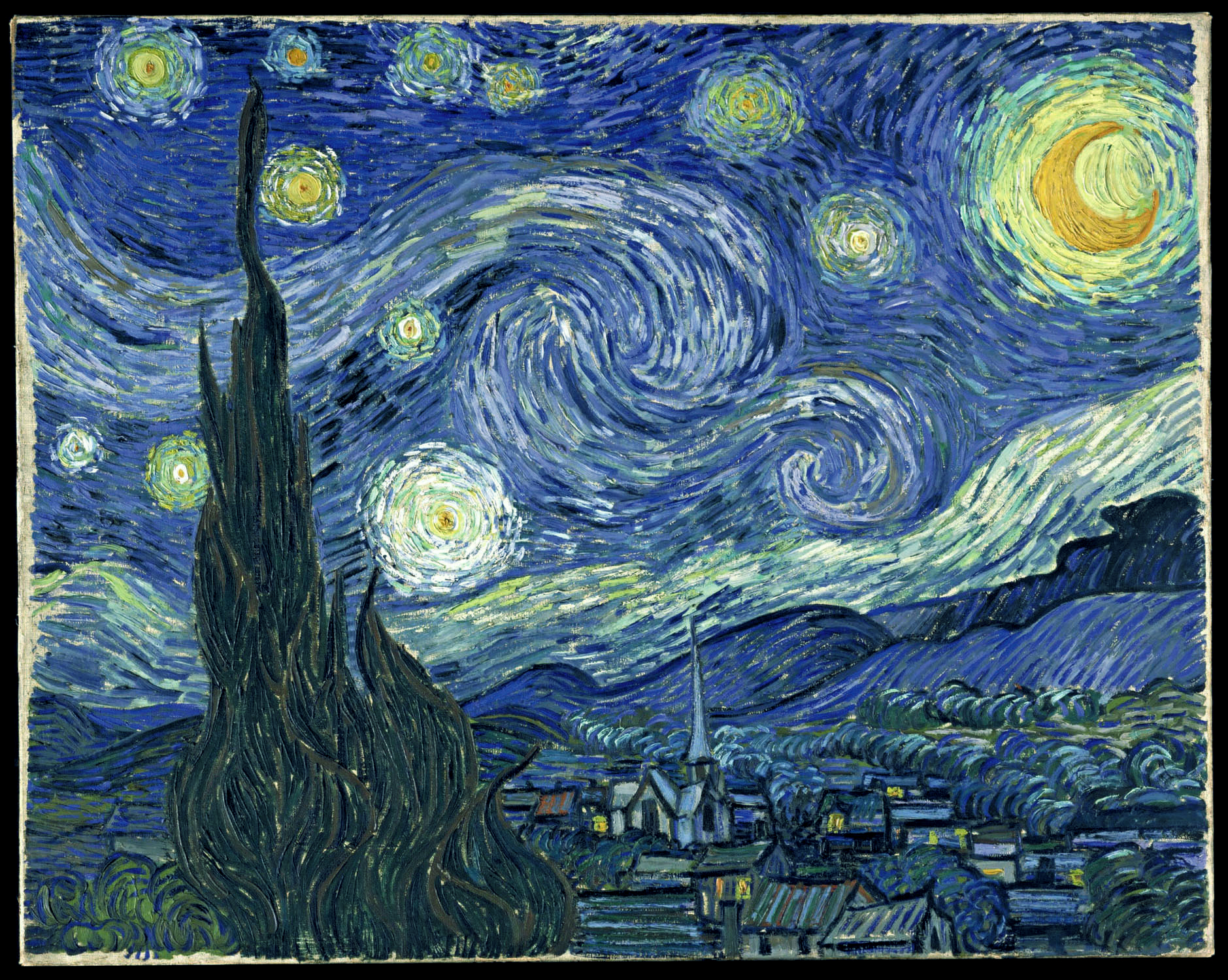
Aesthetic hedonism states that any entity, such as Vincent van Gogh's painting The Starry Night, is beautiful if it causes aesthetic pleasure.

Aesthetic hedonism is a theory about the nature of aesthetic value or beauty. It states that a thing, like a landscape, a painting, or a song, has aesthetic value if people are pleased by it or get aesthetic pleasure from it. It is a subjective theory because it focuses on how people respond to aesthetically engaging things. This view contrasts with objective theories, which assert that aesthetic value only depends on objective or mind-independent features of things, like symmetry or harmonic composition. Some aesthetic hedonists believe that any type of pleasure is relevant to the aesthetic value of a thing. Others offer a more nuanced characterization, saying that aesthetic value is only based on how people with a well-developed taste respond to it.

Outside the academic context of philosophy and psychology, the word hedonism is often used in a narrower sense as a pejorative term. Sometimes called folk hedonism, it describes a lifestyle dedicated to the egoistic pursuit of short-term gratification. For example, a person who indulges in sex and drugs without concern for the long-term consequences of their behavior is acting hedonistically in this sense. The negative connotation of the term is associated with a lack of interest or foresight regarding the potential harm or ethical implications of such actions. Negative consequences can impact both the individual and the people around them, affecting areas such as health, financial stability, relationships, and societal responsibilities. Most philosophical hedonists reject the idea that a lifestyle characterized by folk hedonism leads to long-term happiness.

== Central concepts ==
=== Pleasure and pain ===
Pleasure and pain are fundamental experiences about what is attractive and what is repulsive, shaping how people feel, think, and act. They play a central role in all forms of hedonism. Both pleasure and pain come in degrees corresponding to their intensity. They are typically understood as a continuum ranging from positive degrees through a neutral point to negative degrees. However, some hedonists reject the idea that pleasure and pain form a symmetric pair and suggest instead that avoiding pain is more important than producing pleasure.

The nature of pleasure and pain is disputed and affects the plausibility of various versions of hedonism. In everyday language, these concepts are often understood in a narrow sense associated with specific phenomena, like the pleasure of food and sex or the pain of an injury. However, hedonists usually adopt a broader view in which pleasure and pain cover any positive or negative experience. In this broad sense, anything that feels good is a pleasure, including the joy of watching a sunset, whereas anything that feels bad is a pain, including the sorrow of losing a loved one. A traditionally influential position says that pleasure and pain are specific bodily sensations, similar to those of hot and cold. A more common view in contemporary philosophy holds that pleasure and pain are attitudes of attraction or aversion, respectively, toward objects or contents. (Note: In this context the term "pro-attitude" is also used.) This view implies that they do not have a specific location in the body and do not arise in isolation since they are always directed at an object that people enjoy or suffer.

==== Measurement ====
Both philosophers and psychologists are interested in methods of measuring pleasure and pain to understand their causes and role in decision-making. A common approach is to use self-report questionnaires in which people are asked to quantify how pleasant or unpleasant an experience is. For example, some questionnaires use a nine-point scale from -4 for the most unpleasant experiences, to +4 for the most pleasant ones. Some methods rely on memory and ask individuals to retrospectively assess their experiences. A different approach is for individuals to evaluate their experiences while they are happening to avoid biases and inaccuracies introduced by memory.

In either form, the measurement of pleasure and pain poses various challenges. As a highly subjective phenomenon, it is difficult to establish a standardized metric. Moreover, asking people to rate their experiences using an artificially constructed scale may not accurately reflect their subjective experiences. A closely related problem concerns comparisons between individuals, since distinct people may use the scales differently and thus arrive at varying values even if they had similar experiences. Neuroscientists avoid some of these challenges by using neuroimaging techniques such as PET scans and fMRI. However, this approach comes with new difficulties of its own since the neurological basis of happiness is not yet fully understood.

Based on the idea that individual experiences of pleasure and pain can be quantified, Jeremy Bentham proposed the hedonistic calculus as a method to combine various episodes to arrive at their total contribution to happiness. He suggested that one can find the best course of action by quantitatively comparing the experiences produced by each action. Bentham considered several factors for each pleasurable experience: its intensity and duration, the likelihood that it occurs, its temporal distance, the likelihood that it causes further experiences of pleasure and pain, and the number of people affected. Some simplified versions of the hedonic calculus focus primarily on what is intrinsically valuable to a person and only consider two factors: intensity and duration.

=== Happiness, well-being, and eudaimonia ===
Some theorists formulate hedonism in terms of happiness rather than pleasure and pain. According to a common interpretation, happiness is the balance of pleasure over pain. This means that a person is happy if they have more pleasure than pain and unhappy if the balance is overall negative. There are also other ways to understand happiness that do not fully align with the traditional account of hedonism. One view defines happiness as life satisfaction. This means that a person is happy if they have a favorable attitude toward their life; for example, by being satisfied with their life as a whole or by judging it to be good overall. This attitude may be influenced by the balance of pleasure over pain but can also be shaped by other factors.

Well-being is closely related to happiness as a measure of what is ultimately good for a person. According to a common view, pleasure is one component of well-being. It is controversial whether it is the only factor and what other factors there are; such as health, knowledge, and friendship. Another approach focuses on desires, saying that well-being consists in the satisfaction of desires. The view that the balance of pleasure over pain is the only source of well-being is called prudential hedonism.

Eudaimonia is a form of well-being rooted in ancient Greek thought, serving as a foundation of many forms of moral philosophy during this period. Aristotle understood eudaimonia as a type of flourishing in which a person is happy by leading a fulfilling life and manifesting their inborn capacities. Ethical theories based on eudaimonia often share parallels with hedonism, like an interest in long-term happiness, but are distinguished from it by their emphasis of virtues, advocating an active lifestyle focused on self-realization.

=== Paradox of hedonism and hedonic treadmill ===
Study of the long-term effects of positive and negative events on life satisfaction, indicating a weak form of the hedonic treadmill as life satisfaction slowly normalizes in the years after the event

The paradox of hedonism is the thesis that the direct pursuit of pleasure is counterproductive. It says that conscious attempts to become happy usually backfire, acting as obstacles to one's personal happiness. According to one interpretation, the best way to produce pleasure is to follow other endeavors, with pleasure being a by-product rather than the goal itself. For example, this view suggests that a tennis player who tries to win a game may enjoy the activity more than a tennis player who tries to maximize their enjoyment. It is controversial to what extent the paradox of hedonism is true since, at least in some cases, the pursuit of pleasure is successful.

A related phenomenon, the hedonic treadmill is the theory that people return to a stable level of happiness after significant positive or negative changes to their life circumstances. This suggests that good or bad events affect a person's happiness temporarily but not in the long term—their overall level of happiness tends to revert to a baseline as they get used to the changed situation. For instance, studies on lottery winners indicate that their happiness initially increases as the newly acquired wealth augments their living standards but returns to its original level after about one year. If true, this effect would undermine efforts to increase happiness in the long term, including personal efforts to lead a healthy lifestyle and social efforts to create a free, just, and prosperous society. While there is some empirical support for this effect, it is controversial how strong this tendency is and whether it applies to all fields or only to certain aspects of life.

=== Non-hedonism and asceticism ===
Non-hedonist theories reject certain aspects of hedonism. One form of non-hedonism says that pleasure is one thing in life that matters but not the only thing. Another form argues that some pleasures are good while others are bad. The strongest rejection of hedonism, sometimes termed anti-hedonism, claims that all pleasures are bad. Motivations to adopt this view include the idea that pleasure is an irrational emotion and that the pursuit of pleasure is an obstacle that prevents people from leading a good life.

Asceticism is a lifestyle dedicated to a program of self-discipline that renounces worldly pleasures. It can take various forms, including abstinence from sex and drugs, fasting, withdrawal from society, and practices like prayer and meditation. This lifestyle is often motivated by religious aspirations to become close to the divine, reach a heightened spiritual state, or purify oneself. Most forms of asceticism are opposed to hedonism and its pursuit of pleasure. However, there are forms of ascetic hedonism that combine the two views; for example, by asserting that the right form of ascetic practice leads to higher overall happiness by replacing simple sensory pleasures with deeper and more meaningful spiritual pleasures.

== History ==
=== Ancient ===
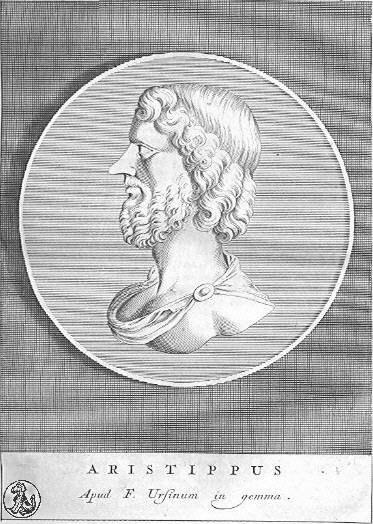
Aristippus of Cyrene is often seen as the first proponent of philosophical hedonism.

Hedonism is one of the oldest philosophical theories. Some interpreters trace it back to the Epic of Gilgamesh, written around 2100–2000 BCE. It was a central topic in ancient Greek thought, where Aristippus of Cyrene (435–356 BCE) is usually identified as its earliest philosophical proponent. He formulated an egoistic hedonism, arguing that personal pleasure is the highest good. Aristippus and the school of Cyrenaics he inspired focused on the gratification of immediate sensory pleasures with little concern for long-term consequences. Plato (c. 428–347 BCE) critiqued this view and proposed a balanced pursuit of pleasure that aligns with virtue and rationality. Following a similar approach, Aristotle (384–322 BCE) associated pleasure with eudaimonia or the realization of natural human capacities, like reason.

Epicurus (341–271 BCE) developed a nuanced form of hedonism that contrasts with the indulgence in immediate gratification proposed by the Cyrenaics. The philosophical movement he founded argues that excessive desires result in anxiety and suffering, suggesting instead that people practice moderation, cultivate a tranquil state of mind, and avoid pain. Following Antisthenes (c. 446—366 BCE), the Cynics warned against the pursuit of pleasure, viewing it as an obstacle to freedom. The Stoics also dismissed a hedonistic lifestyle, focusing on virtue and integrity instead of seeking pleasure and avoiding pain. Lucretius (c. 99–55 BCE) further expanded on Epicureanism, highlighting the importance of overcoming obstacles to personal happiness, such as the fear of death.

In ancient India, starting between the 6th and 5th centuries BCE, the Charvaka school developed an egoistic hedonism. Motivated by the belief in the non-existence of God or an afterlife, this school advocates enjoying life in the present to the fullest. Many other Indian traditions rejected this view and recommended a more ascetic lifestyle, a tendency common among Hindu, Buddhist, and Jain schools of thought. In ancient China, Yang Zhu (c. 440–360 BCE) (Note: Some interpreters question whether Yang Zhu is a historical or a mythical figure.) argued that it is human nature to follow self-interest and satisfy personal desires. His egoistic hedonism inspired the subsequent school of Yangism.

=== Medieval ===
Hedonist philosophy received less attention in medieval thought. The early Christian philosopher Augustine of Hippo (354–430 CE), was critical of the hedonism found in ancient Greek philosophy, warning of the dangers of earthly pleasures as obstacles to a spiritual life dedicated to God. Thomas Aquinas (1225–1274 CE) developed a nuanced perspective on hedonism, characterized by some interpreters as spiritual hedonism. He held that humans are naturally inclined to seek happiness, arguing that the only way to truly satisfy this inclination is through a beatific vision of God. In Islamic philosophy, the problem of pleasure played a central role in the philosophy of al-Razi (c. 864—925 or 932 CE). Similar to Epicureanism, he recommended a life of moderation avoiding excess and asceticism. (Note: It is controversial whether al-Razi's position is a form of hedonism.) Both al-Farabi (c. 878–950 CE) and Avicenna (980–1037 CE) asserted that a form of intellectual happiness, reachable only in the afterlife, is the highest human good.

=== Modern and contemporary ===
At the transition to the early modern period, Lorenzo Valla (c. 1406–1457) synthesized Epicurean hedonism with Christian ethics, suggesting that earthly pleasures associated with the senses are stepping stones to heavenly pleasures associated with Christian virtues. Hedonism gained prominence during the Age of Enlightenment. According to Thomas Hobbes's (1588–1679) psychological hedonism, self-interest in what is pleasant is the root of all human motivation. John Locke (1632–1704) stated that pleasure and pain are the only sources of good and evil. Joseph Butler (1692–1752) formulated an objection to psychological hedonism, arguing that most desires, like wanting food or ambition, are not directed at pleasure itself but at external objects. According to David Hume (1711–1776), pleasure and pain are both the measure of ethical value and the main factors of emotional life. The libertine novels of Marquis de Sade (1740–1814) depicted an extreme form of hedonism, emphasizing full indulgence in pleasurable activities without moral or sexual restraint.

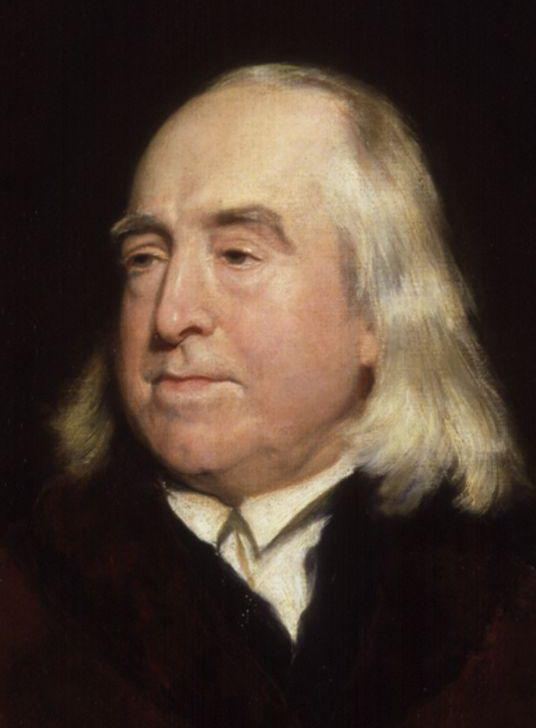
Jeremy Bentham formulated a universal form of hedonism that takes everyone's pleasure into account.

Jeremy Bentham (1748–1832) developed an influential form of hedonism known as classical utilitarianism. One of his key innovations was the rejection of egoistic hedonism, instead advocating that individuals should promote the greatest good for the greatest number of people. He introduced the idea of the hedonic calculus to assess the value of an action based on the pleasurable and painful experiences it causes, relying on factors such as intensity and duration. His student John Stuart Mill (1806–1873) feared that Bentham's quantitative focus on the intensity and duration would lead to an overemphasis on simple sensory pleasures. In response, he included the quality of pleasures as an additional factor, arguing that higher pleasures of the mind are more valuable than lower pleasures of the body. Henry Sidgwick (1838–1900) further refined utilitarianism and clarified many of its core distinctions, such as the contrast between ethical and psychological hedonism and between egoistic and utilitarian hedonism.

Friedrich Nietzsche (1844–1900) rejected ethical hedonism and emphasized the importance of excellence and self-overcoming instead, stating that suffering is necessary to achieve greatness rather than something to be avoided. An influential view about the nature of pleasure was developed by Franz Brentano (1838–1917), who dismissed the idea that pleasure is a sensation located in a specific area of the body, proposing instead that pleasure is a positive attitude that people can have toward various objects (Note: According to this view, for instance, the pleasure of reading a novel is a positive attitude toward the novel.)—a position also later defended by Roderick Chisholm (1916–1999). Sigmund Freud (1856–1939) developed a form of psychological hedonism in his early psychoanalytic theory. He stated that the pleasure principle describes how individuals seek immediate pleasure while avoiding pain whereas the reality principle represents the ability to postpone immediate gratification to avoid unpleasant long-term consequences.

The 20th century saw various criticisms of hedonism. G. E. Moore (1873–1958) rejected the hedonistic idea that pleasure is the only source of intrinsic value. According to his axiological pluralism, there are other sources, such as beauty and knowledge, a criticism also shared by W. D. Ross (1877–1971). Both C. D. Broad (1887–1971) and Richard Brandt (1910–1997) held that malicious pleasures, like enjoying the suffering of others, do not have inherent value. Robert Nozick (1938–2002) used his thought experiment involving an experience machine capable of simulated pleasure to argue against traditional hedonism, which ignores whether there is an authentic connection between pleasure and reality.

In response to these and similar criticisms, Fred Feldman (1941–present) has developed a modified form of hedonism. Drawing on Brentano's attitudinal theory of pleasure, he has defended the idea that even though pleasure is the only source of intrinsic goodness, its value must be adjusted based on whether it is appropriate or deserved. Peter Singer (1946–present) has expanded classical hedonism to include concerns about animal welfare. (Note: Singer was initially a proponent of preference utilitarianism but has shifted his position in favor of hedonistic utilitarianism.) He has advocated effective altruism, relying on empirical evidence and reason to prioritize actions that have the most significant positive impact. Inspired by the philosophy of Albert Camus (1913–1960), Michel Onfray (born 1959) has aimed to rehabilitate Epicurean hedonism in a modern form. David Pearce (1959–present) has developed a transhumanist version of hedonism, arguing for the use of modern technology, ranging from genetic engineering to nanotechnology, to reduce suffering and possibly eliminate it in the future. The emergence of positive psychology at the turn of the 21st century has led to an increased interest in the empirical exploration of various topics of hedonism.

== In various fields ==
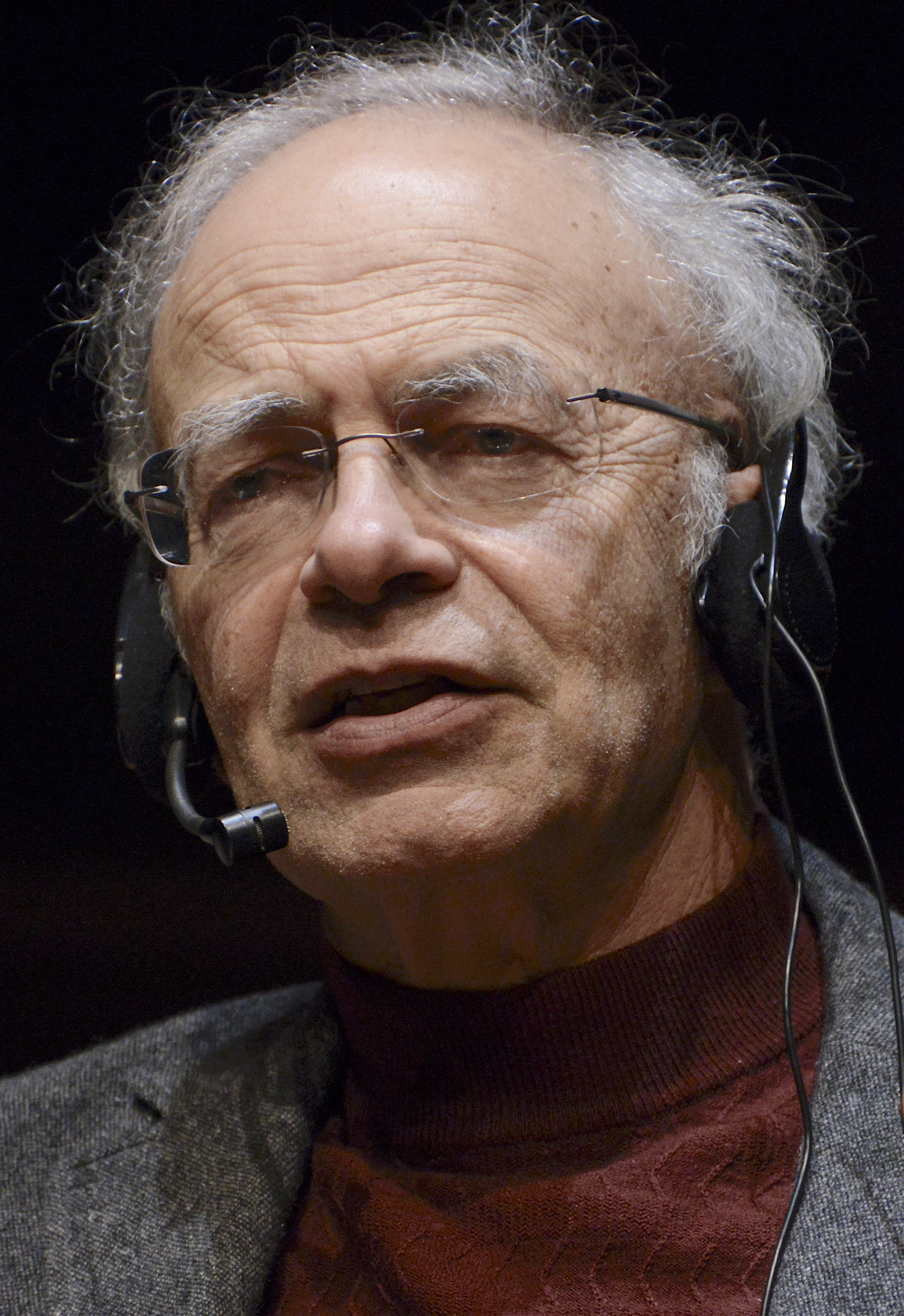
Peter Singer has applied utilitarianism to problems of animal ethics.

Positive psychology studies how to cultivate happiness and promote optimal human functioning. Unlike traditional psychology, which often focuses on psychopathology, positive psychology emphasizes that optimal functioning is more than the absence of mental illness. At the individual level, it investigates experiences of pleasure and pain and the role of character traits, and at the societal level, it examines how social institutions impact human well-being.

Hedonic psychology or hedonics (Note: In a different sense, the term hedonics is also used in ethics for the study of the relation between pleasure and duty.) is one of the main pillars of positive psychology, studying pleasant and unpleasant experiences. It investigates and compares different states of consciousness associated with pleasure and pain, ranging from joy and satisfaction to boredom and sorrow. Hedonic psychology also examines the biological function of these states. This includes their role as signals for what to approach or avoid, and as mechanisms of reward and punishment to reinforce or discourage behavioral patterns, respectively. Additionally, hedonic psychology explores the circumstances that evoke these experiences, on both the biological and social levels. It addresses psychological obstacles to pleasure, such as anhedonia, a reduced ability to experience pleasure, and hedonophobia, a fear or aversion to pleasure. Positive psychology in general and hedonic psychology in particular are relevant to hedonism by providing a scientific understanding of the experiences of pleasure and pain and the processes impacting them.

In the field of economics, welfare economics examines how economic activities affect social well-being. It is often understood as a form of normative economics, which evaluates economic processes and policies rather than just describing them. Hedonist approaches to welfare economics state that pleasure is the main criterion of this evaluation, meaning that economic activities should aim to promote societal happiness. The economics of happiness is a closely related field studying the relation between economic phenomena, such as wealth, and individual happiness. Economists also employ hedonic regression, a method used to estimate the value of commodities based on their utility or effect on the owner's pleasure.

Animal ethics is the branch of ethics studying human behavior towards other animals. Hedonism is an influential position in this field as a theory of animal welfare. It emphasizes that humans have the responsibility to consider the impact of their actions on how animals feel to minimize harm done to them. Some quantitative hedonists suggest that there is no qualitative difference between the pleasure and pain experienced by humans and other animals. As a result of this view, moral considerations about promoting the happiness of others apply to all sentient animals. This position is modified by some qualitative hedonists, who argue that human experiences carry more weight because they include higher forms of pleasure and pain.

While many religious traditions are critical of hedonism, some have embraced it or certain aspects of it, such as Christian hedonism. Elements of hedonism are also found in various forms of popular culture, such as consumerism, the entertainment industry, and the enduring influences of the sexual revolution.
