= Henry Sidgwick =

British philosopher and economist (1838–1900)

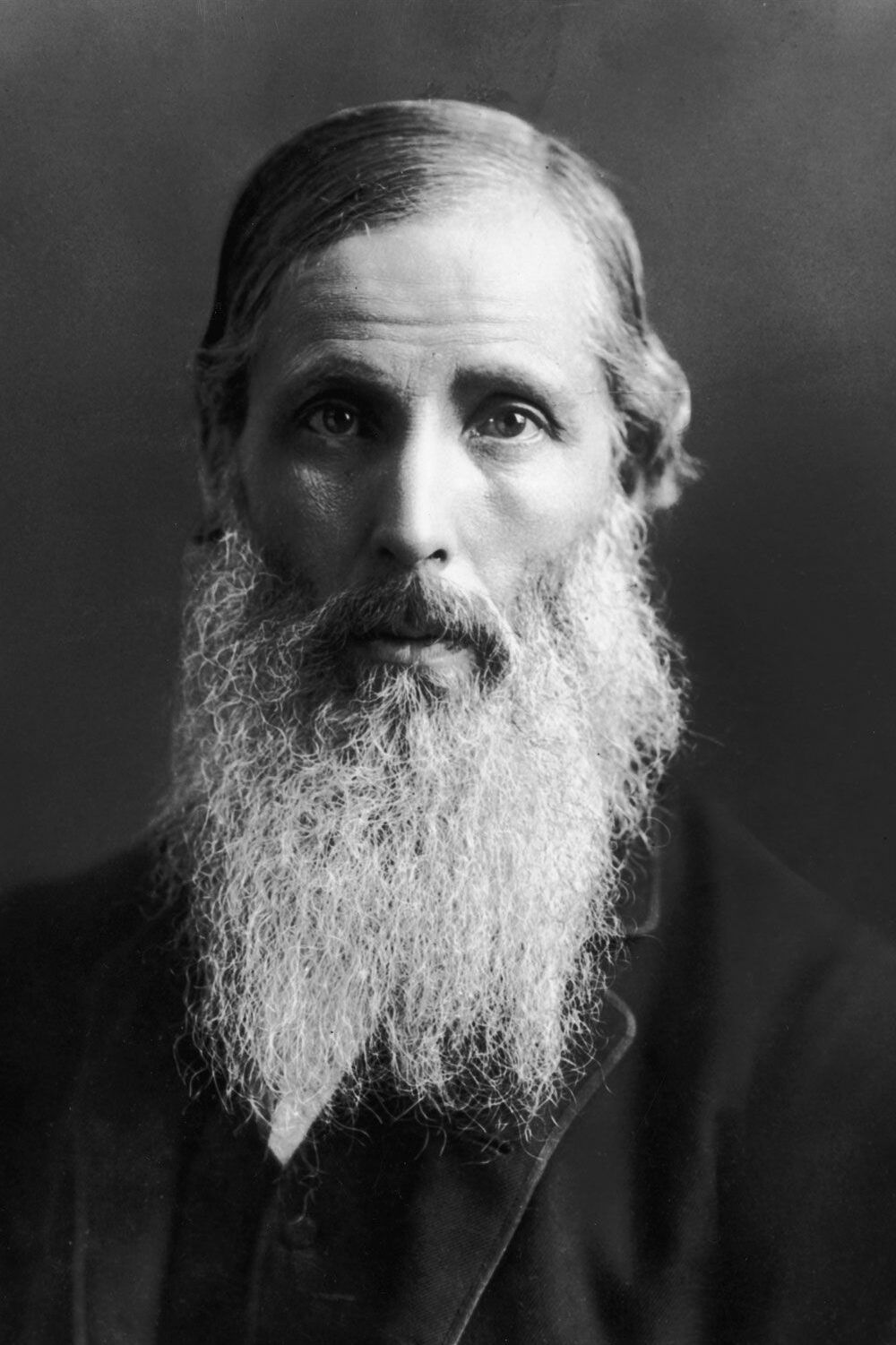
- Born: 31 May 1838; Skipton, Yorkshire, England
- Died: 28 August 1900 (aged 62); Cambridge, Cambridgeshire, England
- Political party: Liberal Unionist Party
- Spouse: Eleanor Mildred Balfour (m. 1876)
- Relatives: Mary Benson (sister)

Education
- Education: Trinity College, Cambridge

Philosophical work
- Era: 19th-century philosophy
- Region: Western philosophy
- School: Utilitarianism
- Institutions: Trinity College, Cambridge
- Notable students: William Ernest Johnson; Constance Jones
- Main interests: Economics, ethics, political philosophy
- Notable ideas: Average and total utilitarianism, ethical hedonism, ethical intuitionism, paradox of hedonism

Henry Sidgwick (/ˈsɪdʒwɪk/; 31 May 1838 – 28 August 1900) was an English utilitarian philosopher and economist and is best known in philosophy for his utilitarian treatise The Methods of Ethics. His work in economics has also had a lasting influence.

He was the Knightbridge Professor of Moral Philosophy at the University of Cambridge from 1883 until his death. He was one of the founders and first president of the Society for Psychical Research and a member of the Metaphysical Society and promoted the higher education of women.

In 1875, with Millicent Garrett Fawcett, he co-founded Newnham College, a women-only constituent college of the University of Cambridge. It was the second Cambridge college to admit women, after Girton College.

In 1856 Sidgwick joined the Cambridge Apostles intellectual secret society.

== Biography ==
Henry Sidgwick was born at Skipton in Yorkshire, where his father, the Reverend W. Sidgwick (died 1841), was headmaster of the local grammar school, Ermysted's Grammar School. Henry's mother was Mary Sidgwick, née Crofts (1807–79).

Henry Sidgwick was educated at Rugby (where his cousin, subsequently his brother-in-law, Edward White Benson, later Archbishop of Canterbury, was a master), and at Trinity College, Cambridge. While at Trinity, Sidgwick became a member of the Cambridge Apostles. In 1859, he was senior classic, 33rd wrangler, chancellor's medallist and Craven scholar. In the same year, he was elected to a fellowship at Trinity and soon afterwards he became a lecturer in classics there, a post he held for ten years. The Sidgwick Site, home to several of the university's arts and humanities faculties, is named after him.

In 1869, he exchanged his lectureship in classics for one in moral philosophy, a subject to which he had been turning his attention. In the same year, deciding that he could no longer in good conscience declare himself a member of the Church of England, he resigned his fellowship. He retained his lectureship and in 1881 he was elected an honorary fellow. In 1874 he published The Methods of Ethics (6th ed. 1901, containing emendations written just before his death), by common consent a major work, which made his reputation outside the university. John Rawls called it the "first truly academic work in moral theory, modern in both method and spirit".

In 1875, he was appointed praelector on moral and political philosophy at Trinity, and in 1883 he was elected Knightbridge Professor of Philosophy. In 1885, the religious test having been removed, his college once more elected him to a fellowship on the foundation.

Besides his lecturing and literary labours, Sidgwick took an active part in the business of the university and in many forms of social and philanthropic work. He was a member of the General Board of Studies from its foundation in 1882 to 1899; he was also a member of the Council of the Senate of the Indian Civil Service Board and the Local Examinations and Lectures Syndicate and chairman of the Special Board for Moral Science. While at Cambridge Sidgwick taught a young Bertrand Russell.

A 2004 biography of Sidgwick by Bart Schultz sought to establish that Sidgwick was a lifelong homosexual, but it is unknown whether he ever consummated his inclinations. According to the biographer, Sidgwick struggled internally throughout his life with issues of hypocrisy and openness in connection with his own forbidden desires.

He was one of the founders and first president of the Society for Psychical Research, and was a member of the Metaphysical Society.

He also promoted the higher education of women. He helped to start the higher local examinations for women, and the lectures held at Cambridge in preparation for these. It was at his suggestion and with his help that Anne Clough opened a house of residence for students, which developed into Newnham College, Cambridge. When, in 1880, the North Hall was added, Sidgwick lived there for two years. His wife became principal of the college after Clough's death in 1892, and they lived there for the rest of his life. During this whole period, Sidgwick took the deepest interest in the welfare of the college. In politics, he was a liberal and became a Liberal Unionist (a party that later effectively merged with the Conservative party) in 1886.

In 1892 Sidgwick was the president of the second International Congress of Experimental Psychology and delivered the opening address. From the first twelve such international congresses, the International Union of Psychological Science eventually emerged.

Early in 1900 he was forced by ill-health to resign his professorship, and died a few months later. Sidgwick, who died an agnostic, is buried in Terling All Saints Churchyard, Terling, Essex, with his wife.

== Ethics ==
Sidgwick summarizes his position in ethics as utilitarianism "on an Intuitional basis". This reflects, and disputes, the rivalry then felt among British philosophers between the philosophies of utilitarianism and ethical intuitionism, which is illustrated, for example, by John Stuart Mill's criticism of ethical intuitionism in the first chapter of his book Utilitarianism.

Sidgwick developed this position due to his dissatisfaction with an inconsistency in Jeremy Bentham and John Stuart Mill's utilitarianism, between what he labels "psychological hedonism" and "ethical hedonism". Psychological hedonism states that everyone always will do what is in their self-interest, whereas ethical hedonism states that everyone ought to do what is in the general interest. Sidgwick believed neither Bentham nor Mill had an adequate answer as to how the prescription that someone ought to sacrifice their own interest to the general interest could have any force, given they combined that prescription with the claim that everyone will in fact always pursue their own individual interest. Ethical intuitions, such as those argued for by philosophers such as William Whewell, could, according to Sidgwick, provide the missing force for such normative claims.

For Sidgwick, ethics is about which actions are objectively right. Our knowledge of right and wrong arises from common-sense morality, which lacks a coherent principle at its core. The task of philosophy in general and ethics in particular is not so much to create new knowledge but to systematize existing knowledge. Sidgwick tries to achieve this by formulating methods of ethics, which he defines as rational procedures "for determining right conduct in any particular case". He identifies three methods: intuitionism, which involves various independently valid moral principles to determine what ought to be done, and two forms of hedonism, in which rightness only depends on the pleasure and pain following from the action. Hedonism is subdivided into egoistic hedonism, which only takes the agent's own well-being into account, and universal hedonism or utilitarianism, which is concerned with everyone's well-being.

As Sidgwick sees it, one of the central issues of ethics is whether these three methods can be harmonized with each other. Sidgwick argues that this is possible for intuitionism and utilitarianism. But a full success of this project is impossible since egoism, which he considers as equally rational, cannot be reconciled with utilitarianism unless religious assumptions are introduced. Such assumptions, for example, the existence of a personal God who rewards and punishes the agent in the afterlife, could reconcile egoism and utilitarianism. But without them, we have to admit a "dualism of practical reason" that constitutes a "fundamental contradiction" in our moral consciousness.

=== Metaethics ===
Sidgwick's metaethics involve an explicit defence of a non-naturalist form of moral realism. He is committed to moral cognitivism: that moral language is robustly truth-apt, and that moral properties are not reducible to any natural properties. This non-naturalist realism is combined with an ethical intuitionist epistemology to account for the possibility of knowing moral truths.

=== Esoteric morality ===
Sidgwick is closely, and controversially, associated with esoteric morality: the position that a moral system (such as utilitarianism) may be acceptable, but that it is not acceptable for that moral system to be widely taught or accepted.

Bernard Williams would refer to Sidgwickian esoteric utilitarianism as "Government House Utilitarianism" and claim that it reflects the elite British colonialist setting of Sidgwick's thought.

=== Philosophical legacy ===
According to John Rawls, Sidgwick's importance to modern ethics rests with two contributions: providing the most sophisticated defence available of utilitarianism in its classical form, and providing in his comparative methodology an exemplar for how ethics is to be researched as an academic subject. Allen Wood describes Sidgwick-inspired comparative methodology as the "standard model" of research methodology among contemporary ethicists.

Despite his importance to contemporary ethicists, Sidgwick's reputation as a philosopher fell precipitously in the decades following his death, and he would be regarded as a minor figure in philosophy for a large part of the first half of the 20th century. Bart Schultz argues that this negative assessment is explained by the tastes of groups which would be influential at Cambridge in the years following Sidgwick's death: Wittgensteinian ordinary language philosophers, the remnants of British idealism, and, most importantly, the Bloomsbury Group. John Deigh, however, disputes Schultz's explanation, and instead attributes this fall in interest in Sidgwick to changing philosophical understandings of axioms in mathematics, which would throw into question whether axiomatization provided an appropriate model for a foundationalist epistemology of the sort Sidgwick tried to build for ethics.

== Economics ==
Sidgwick worked in economics at a time when the British economics mainstream was undergoing the transition from the classical economics of Adam Smith, David Ricardo, and John Stuart Mill to the neo-classical economics of William Stanley Jevons and Alfred Marshall. Sidgwick responded to these changes by preferring to emphasize the similarities between the old economics and the new, choosing to base his work on J.S. Mill's Principles of Political Economy, incorporating the insights of Jevons.

Sidgwick believed self-interest to be a centrepiece of human motivation. He believed that this self-interest had immense utility in the economic world, and that people should not be blamed for wanting to sell a good for the highest possible price or buy a good for the lowest possible price. He distinguished, though, a difference between the ability of an individual to properly judge their own interests and the ability of a group of people to properly come to a point of maximum group happiness. He found two divergences in the outcomes of the decisions of the individual and of the group. One instance of this is the idea that there is more to life than the accumulation of wealth, so it is not always in the best interest of society to simply aim for wealth-maximizing results. This effect may be due to limitations of the individual, from attributes such as ignorance, immaturity, and disability. This can be a moral judgement, such as the decision to limit the sale of alcohol to an individual out of concern for their well-being. The second instance is the fact that wealth-maximizing outcomes for society are simply not always a possibility when individuals within that society are all attempting to maximize their individual wealth. Contradictions are likely to emerge that cause one individual to a lower maximum wealth due to another individual's actions, therefore disallowing the possibility of a society-wide wealth maximization. Problems also are possible to occur due to monopoly.

Sidgwick would have a major influence on the development of welfare economics, due to his own work on the subject inspiring Arthur Cecil Pigou's work The Economics of Welfare.

Alfred Marshall, founder of the Cambridge School of Economics, would describe Sidgwick as his "spiritual mother and father".

== Parapsychology ==
Sidgwick had a lifelong interest in the paranormal. This interest, combined with his personal struggles with religious belief, motivated his gathering of young colleagues interested in assessing the empirical evidence for paranormal or miraculous phenomena. This gathering would be known as the "Sidgwick Group", and would be a predecessor of the Society for Psychical Research, which would count Sidgwick as founder and first president.

Sidgwick would connect his concerns with parapsychology to his research in ethics. He believed the dualism of practical reason might be solved outside of philosophical ethics if it were shown, empirically, that the recommendations of rational egoism and utilitarianism coincided due to the reward of moral behaviour after death.

According to Bart Schultz, despite Sidgwick's prominent role in institutionalizing parapsychology as a discipline, he had upon it an "overwhelmingly negative, destructive effect, akin to that of recent debunkers of parapsychology"; he and his Sidgwick Group associates became notable for exposing fraud mediums. One such incident was the exposure of the fraud of Eusapia Palladino.

== Religion ==
Brought up in the Church of England, Sidgwick drifted away from orthodox Christianity, and as early as 1862, he described himself as a theist, independent from established religion. By 1888, he had rejected theism as a belief, when he co-founded the Cambridge Ethical Society (an early humanist organisation and part of the Union of Ethical Societies), for whom he served as president until 1896. The group's motto was ‘Gedenke zu leben’: remember to live. For the rest of his life, although he regarded Christianity as "indispensable and irreplaceable... from a sociological point of view", he found himself unable to return to it as a religion.

== Family ==
In 1876, Sidgwick married physics researcher Eleanor Mildred Balfour in London. A member of the Cambridge Ladies Dining Society, and later Principal of Newnham College, Cambridge, she was the sister of Arthur Balfour, a future Prime Minister of the United Kingdom. They had no children and remained married until his death.

== Works ==
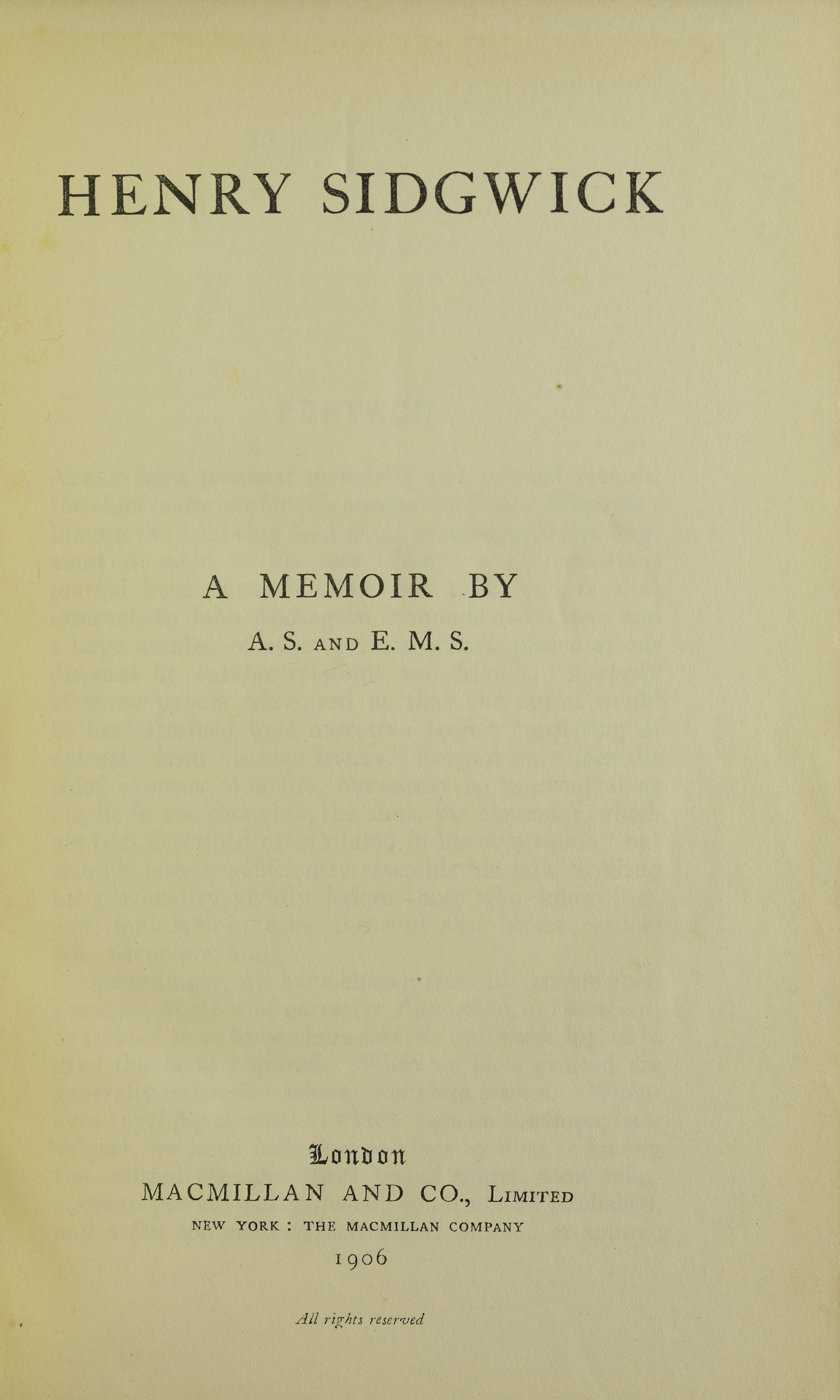
Arthur & Eleanor Mildred Sidgwick, Henry Sidgwick, 1906

- The Ethics of Conformity and Subscription. 1870.
- The Methods of Ethics. London, 1874, 7th edition 1907.
- The Theory of Evolution in its application to Practice, in Mind, Volume I, Number 1 January 1876, 52–67,
- Principles of Political Economy. London, 1883, 3rd edition 1901.
- The Scope and Method of Economic Science. 1885.
- Outlines of the History of Ethics for English Readers. 1886 5th edition 1902 (enlarged from his article Ethics in the Encyclopædia Britannica Eleventh Edition).
- The Elements of Politics. London, 1891, 4th edition 1919.
- "The Philosophy of Common Sense", in Mind, New Series, Volume IV, Number 14, April 1895, 145–158.
- Economic science and economics, Palgrave's Dictionary of Political Economy, 1896, v. 1, (reprinted in The New Palgrave: A Dictionary of Economics, 1987, v. 2, 58–59.)
- Practical Ethics. London, 1898, 2nd edition 1909.
- Philosophy; its Scope and Relations. London, 1902.
- Lectures on the Ethics of T. H. Green, Mr Herbert Spencer and J. Martineau. 1902.
- The Development of European Polity. 1903, 3rd edition 1920
- Miscellaneous Essays and Addresses. 1904.
- Lectures on the Philosophy of Kant and other philosophical lectures and essays. 1905.

== See also ==
- Arthur Sidgwick
- Cross-correspondences (Palm Sunday Case)

== Sources ==
- Anonymous (9 November 1895). "Exit Eusapia!". The British Medical Journal. 2 (1819). British Medical Association: 1182.
- Brooke, Christopher Nugent Lawrence; Leader, Damian Riehl (1988). "1: Prologue". A History of the University of Cambridge: 1870–1990. Cambridge University Press. p. 1. ISBN 9780521343503. "In 1869 Henry Sidgwick, who had become a devout agnostic, made protest against the survival of religious tests in Cambridge by resigning his Trinity fellowship."
- Bryce, James (2016) [1903]. "Henry Sidgwick". Studies in Contemporary Biography. New York: Macmillan. ISBN 9780790544946.
- Collini, Stefan (1992). "The ordinary experience of civilized life: Sidgwick's politics and the method of reflective analysis". In Schultz, Bart (ed.). Essays on Henry Sidgwick. Cambridge University Press. pp. 333–368. ISBN 0-521-39151-2.
- Deane, Phyllis (1987). "Sidgwick, Henry". The New Palgrave: A Dictionary of Economics. Vol. 4. pp. 328–329.
- de Lazari-Radek, Katarzyna; Singer, Peter (4 January 2010). "Secrecy in consequentialism: A defence of esoteric morality". Ratio. 23 (1). Wiley: 34–58. doi:10.1111/j.1467-9329.2009.00449.x.
- Deigh, John (12 November 2007). "Sidgwick's Epistemology". Utilitas. 19 (4). Cambridge University Press: 435–446. doi:10.1017/S0953820807002737. S2CID 144210231.
- Medema, Steven G. (1 December 2008). ""Losing My Religion": Sidgwick, Theism, and the Struggle for Utilitarian Ethics in Economic Analysis". History of Political Economy. 40 (5): 189–211. doi:10.1215/00182702-2007-066.
- Nussbaum, Martha (6 June 2005). "The Epistemology of the Closet". The Nation. United States: Nation Company, L.P. Archived from the original on 19 August 2015.
- Phillips, David (2011). Sidgwickian Ethics. New York: Oxford University Press.
- Rawls, John (September 1980). "Kantian Constructivism in Moral Theory". The Journal of Philosophy. 77 (9). The Journal of Philosophy, Inc.: 515–572.
- Rawls, John (1981). "Foreword to The Methods of Ethics". The Methods of Ethics (7th ed.). Indianapolis: Hackett Publishing Company. p. v-vi. ISBN 978-0915145287.
- Schultz, Bart (2009) [2004]. Henry Sidgwick - Eye of the Universe: An Intellectual Biography. Cambridge University Press. doi:10.1017/CBO9780511498336. ISBN 9780511498336.
- Schultz, Barton (2019). "Henry Sidgwick". The Stanford Encyclopedia of Philosophy. Metaphysics Research Lab, Stanford University.
- Sidgwick, Henry (16 November 1895). "Exit Eusapia". The British Medical Journal. 2 (1820). British Medical Association: 1263. doi:10.1136/bmj.2.1820.1263-e. S2CID 220131916.
- Sidgwick, Henry (1981) [1907]. The Methods of Ethics (7th ed.). Indianapolis: Hackett Publishing Company. ISBN 978-0915145287.
- Smart, J.J.C.; Williams, Bernard (1973). Smart, J.J.C. (ed.). Utilitarianism: For and Against. New York: Cambridge University Press. ISBN 978-0-521-09822-9.
- Williams, Bernard (2009) [1982]. "The Point of View of the Universe: Sidgwick and the Ambitions of Ethics". The Sense of the Past: Essays in the History of Philosophy. Princeton University Press. pp. 277–296. doi:10.1515/9781400827107.277. ISBN 978-0-691-13408-6.
- Wood, Allen (2008). Kantian Ethics. New York: Cambridge University Press. ISBN 978-0521671149.
