= Yang Zhu =

Chinese founder of Yangist philosophy (440–c.360 BC)

Yang Zhu (/ˈjɑːŋ ˈdʒuː/; simplified Chinese: 杨朱; traditional Chinese: 楊朱; pinyin: Yáng Zhū; Wade–Giles: Yang Chu; 440–c.360 BC), also known as Yangzi (Master Yang), was a Chinese philosopher during the Warring States period. An early ethical egoist alternative to Mohist and Confucian thought, Yang Zhu's surviving ideas appear primarily in the Chinese texts Huainanzi, Lüshi Chunqiu, Mengzi, and possibly the Liezi and Zhuangzi. He founded the philosophical school of Yangism.

The philosophies attributed to Yang Zhu, as presented in the Liezi, clash with the primarily Daoist influence of the rest of the work. Of particular note is his recognition of self-preservation (weiwo 為我), which has led him to be credited with "the discovery of the body". In comparison with other Chinese philosophical giants, Yang Zhu has recently faded into relative obscurity, but his influence in his own time was so widespread that Mencius described his philosophies along with the antithetical ideas of Mozi as "floods and wild animals that ravage the land".

== Views ==
=== Mencius's view of Yang Zhu ===
According to Mencius, "Yang's principle is, 'Each for himself'—which does not acknowledge the claims of the sovereign. Mo's principle is, 'To love all equally'—which does not acknowledge the peculiar affection due to a father. To acknowledge neither king nor father is to be in the state of the beast. If their principles are not stopped, and the principles of Confucius set forth, their perverse speaking will delude the people, and stop up the path of benevolence and righteousness."

Mencius criticized Yang Zhu as one "who would not pluck a hair from his body to benefit the world." However, Yang Zhu emphasized that self-impairment, symbolized by the plucking of one's hair, would in no way lead to others' benefit. Although he would not toil for others, he would not harm them for personal gain or advantage, which should be avoided as external to one's nature.

Yang Zhu taught, "If everyone does not harm a single hair, and if everyone does not benefit the world, the world will be well governed of itself." In other words, everyone should mind their own business, neither giving nor taking from others, and be content with what he has, and in that way one will be happy and also contribute to the welfare of the world. When personal interests conflict with collective interests or national interests, more respect and protection of personal interests should be taken. On the surface, this seems to be unfavorable to society and the collective, and it is also the most vulnerable to questioning and criticism. In fact, on the contrary, this has safeguarded both personal interests and social interests. Because the foundation of society exists for people, not people to exist for society.

=== Philosophy of nature ===
Although his detractors present him solely as a hedonist and egoist, Yang Zhu was, according to contemporary sources, an early Daoist teacher identified with a new philosophical trend toward naturalism as the best means of preserving life in a decadent and turbulent world.

All beings, thought Yang Zhu, have the survival instinct, but man, the highest of creatures, lacking the strength of animals, must rely on intelligence to survive rather than strength. He felt that strength was despicable when used against others.

=== Philosophy of life ===
Yang Zhu directed his thought to attainment of the spiritual self through self-expression and finding contentment. Henri Maspero described Yang's philosophy as "a mixture of pessimism and fatalism". The Yang Zhu chapter of Liezi says:

One hundred years is the limit of a long life. Not one in a thousand ever attains it. Suppose there is one such person. Infancy and feeble old age take almost half of his time. Rest during sleep at night and what is wasted during the waking hours in the daytime take almost half of that. Pain and sickness, sorrow and suffering, death (of relatives) and worry and fear take almost half of the rest. In the ten and some years that is left, I reckon, there is not one moment in which we can be happy, at ease without worry. This being the case, what is life for? What pleasure is there? For beauty and abundance, that is all. For music and sex, that is all. But the desire for beauty and abundance cannot always be satisfied, and music and sex cannot always be enjoyed. Besides, we are prohibited by punishment and exhorted by rewards, pushed by fame and checked by law. We busily strive for the empty praise which is only temporary, and seek extra glory that would come after death. Being alone ourselves, we pay great care to what our ears hear and what our eyes see, and are much concerned with what is right or wrong for our bodies and minds. Thus we lose the great happiness of the present and cannot give ourselves free rein for a single moment. What is the difference between that and many chains and double prisons?

=== Philosophy of death ===
Yang Zhu agreed with the search for happiness, but he felt one should not strive for life beyond one's allotted span, nor should one unnecessarily shorten one's life. Death is as natural as life, Yang Zhu felt, and therefore should be viewed with neither fear nor awe. Funeral ceremonies are of no worth to the deceased. "Dead people are not concerned whether their bodies are buried in coffins, cremated, dumped in water or in a ditch; nor whether the body is dressed in fine clothes. What matters most is that before death strikes one lives life to the fullest."

== See also ==
- Egoism
- Hedonism
- Yangism
