= The Methods of Ethics =

1874 book by Henry Sidgwick

- Author: Henry Sidgwick
- Language: English
- Subject: Ethics
- Publication date: 1874
- Publication place: United Kingdom
- Media type: Print

The Methods of Ethics is a book on ethics first published in 1874 by the English philosopher Henry Sidgwick. The Stanford Encyclopedia of Philosophy indicates that The Methods of Ethics "in many ways marked the culmination of the classical utilitarian tradition." Noted moral and political philosopher John Rawls, writing in the Forward to the Hackett reprint of the 7th edition, says Methods of Ethics "is the clearest and most accessible formulation of... 'the classical utilitarian doctrine'". Contemporary utilitarian philosopher Peter Singer has said that the Methods "is simply the best book on ethics ever written."

The main aim of the book is to provide a systematic account of the principles of commonsense morality. The three general methods of making ethical choices commonly used in ordinary morality are intuitionism (following general principles), egoism (promoting one's own well-being) and utilitarianism (promoting everyone's well-being). According to Sidgwick, intuitionism and utilitarianism are in harmony with each other but egoism cannot be reconciled with utilitarianism, resulting in a "dualism of practical reason".

== Commonsense and three methods of ethics ==
Like Aristotle, Sidgwick believed that systematic reflection on ethics should begin with the way ordinary people think about moral behavior—what he calls “commonsense morality.” His main goal in the Methods is to offer a systematic and precise “examination, at once expository and critical, of the different methods of obtaining reasoned convictions as to what ought to be done which are found—either explicit or implicit—in the moral consciousness of mankind generally” (Methods, p. vii). His focus is primarily on detailed exposition of commonsense morality; he does not attempt to defend any particular theory of ethics, including utilitarianism, which he explicitly endorses in other works and speaks positively of in many passages in the Methods. However, Sidgwick's goal is not simply exposition; he also wants to clarify, systematize, and improve ordinary morality by noting points where it is vague, undeveloped, or inharmonious, and then suggesting ways that these problems can be fixed.

Sidgwick defines methods of ethics as rational procedures "for determining right conduct in any particular case". He claims that there are three general methods of making value choices that are commonly used in ordinary morality: intuitionism, egoism, and utilitarianism. Intuitionism is the view that we can see straight off that some acts are right or wrong, and can grasp self-evident and unconditionally binding moral rules. Egoism, or “Egoistic Hedonism,” claims that each individual should seek his or her own greatest happiness. Utilitarianism, or “Universalistic Hedonism,” is the view that each person should promote the greatest amount of happiness on the whole.

== Harmony and conflict between the methods ==
Most of Sidgwick's 500-page book is devoted to a careful and systematic examination of these three methods. In the process, he identifies numerous problems with each method and often suggests clarifications and refinements in order to cast them in the best possible light. His hope is that these three methods (duly clarified and systematized) will be mutually consistent, so that practical reason will be coherent and speak to us in one clear, unified voice. This hope, he argues, can only partially be satisfied.

He claims that two methods—intuitionism and utilitarianism—can be fully harmonized. Intuitionism holds that we have intuitive, i.e. non-inferential, knowledge of moral principles, which are self-evident to the knower. The criteria for this type of knowledge include that they are expressed in clear terms, that the different principles are mutually consistent with each other and that there is expert consensus on them. According to Sidgwick, commonsense moral principles fail to pass this test, but there are some more abstract principles that pass it, like that "what is right for me must be right for all persons in precisely similar circumstances" or that "one should be equally concerned with all temporal parts of one’s life". These abstract principles, Sidgwick claims, turn out to be fully compatible with utilitarianism, and in fact are necessary to provide a rational basis for utilitarian theory. Moreover, Sidgwick argues, intuitionism in its most defensible form is saturated with latent utilitarian presuppositions. Thus, contrary to what most ethicists have believed, there is no fundamental clash between intuitionism and utilitarianism.

The problem lies with squaring utilitarianism with egoism. Sidgwick believes that the basic principles of egoism (“Pursue your own greatest happiness”) and utilitarianism (“Promote the general happiness”) are both self-evident. Like many previous moralists, he argues that self-interest and morality coincide in the great majority of cases. But can it be demonstrated that they always coincide? Sidgwick argues that it cannot. There are times, for example, when the general good might require the sacrifice of self-interest (e.g., giving up one's life to save a fellow soldier). The only way duty and self-interest necessarily overlap is if God exists, and He makes sure through appropriate punishments and rewards that it is always in a person's long-term self-interest to do what is ethical. But appeals to religion, Sidgwick argues, are inappropriate in philosophical ethics, which should aspire to be “scientific” in its exclusion of theological or supernatural assumptions. The rather depressing upshot, Sidgwick claims, is that there is a “fundamental contradiction” in our moral consciousness, a “dualism of practical reason.” Our ethical intuitions speak to us in two conflicting voices, and there is no apparent way to resolve the discord.

== Influence ==
Sidgwick's Methods of Ethics was—and is—important for many reasons. Though earlier utilitarians like William Paley, Jeremy Bentham, and John Stuart Mill had sketched versions of utilitarian ethics, Sidgwick was the first theorist to develop the theory in detail and to investigate how it relates both to other popular ethical theories and to conventional morality. His efforts to show that utilitarianism is substantially compatible with common moral values helped to popularize utilitarian ethics in the late-nineteenth and early-twentieth centuries. The careful, painstaking, and detailed way Sidgwick discusses moral problems was an important influence on G. E. Moore, Bertrand Russell, and other founders of Anglo-American analytic philosophy. Contemporary ethicists Derek Parfit and Peter Singer have acknowledged Sidgwick as a major influence on their thought. As Sidgwick scholar J. B. Schneewind has noted, the Methods “is widely viewed as one of the best works of moral philosophy ever written. His account of classical utilitarianism is unsurpassed. His discussions of the general status of morality and of particular moral concepts are models of clarity and acumen. His insights about the relations between egoism and utilitarianism have stimulated much valuable research. And his way of framing moral problems, by asking about the relations between commonsense beliefs and the best available theories, has set much of the agenda for twentieth-century ethics.”

== See also ==
- Ethical intuitionism
- Rational egoism
