= History of ethics =

Ethics is the branch of philosophy that examines right and wrong moral behavior, moral concepts (such as justice, virtue, duty) and moral language. Ethics or moral philosophy is a branch of philosophy that "involves systematizing, defending, and recommending concepts of right and wrong behavior". The field of ethics, along with aesthetics, concerns matters of value, and thus comprises the branch of philosophy called axiology.

Various ethical theories pose various answers to the question "What is the greatest good?" and elaborate a complete set of proper behaviors for individuals and groups. Ethical theories are closely related to forms of life in various social orders.

== Origins ==
The epic poems that stand at the beginning of many world literatures, such as the Mesopotamian Epic of Gilgamesh, Homer's Iliad and the Icelandic Eddas, portray a set of values that suit the strong leader of a small tribe. Valour and success are the principal qualities of a hero and are generally not constrained by moral considerations. Revenge and vendetta are appropriate activities for heroes. The gods that appear in such epics are not defenders of moral values but are capricious forces of nature and are to be feared and propitiated.

More strictly ethical claims are found occasionally in the literature of ancient civilizations that is aimed at lower classes of society. The Sumerian Farmer's Almanac and the Egyptian Instruction of Amenemope both advise farmers to leave some grain for poor gleaners, and promise favours from the gods for doing so. A number of ancient religions and ethical thinkers also put forward some version of the Golden Rule, at least in its negative version: do not do to others what you do not want done to yourself.

== Ancient Greek ethics ==
While Greek moral thought was originally based on mythology, which provided moral meaning but no comprehensive framework, from the 600s BC a new moral approach emerged which used rational arguments instead, leading to the rise of philosophy as a distinct mode of thought. This has been especially attributed to Socrates. The Socratic method aimed to establish moral truths by questioning the beliefs of others, rather than by explaining them directly. He opposed the moral relativism of the Sophists, insisting on the formulation of moral principles from beginning. As portrayed in Plato's Republic, he articulates the greatest good as the transcendent "form of good itself". In his personal life, Socrates lived extremely morally. He was chaste, disciplined, pious, responsible, and cared for his friends. In the so-called Euthyphro dilemma, he raised the problem of whether divine action was motivated by it being good, or whether it was good because it was divine. In Gorgias he defends the notion that it is better to suffer injustice than to do it.

The key work of Plato's ethics was the Republic, which was focused on conceiving justice, a concept which for Plato was inclusive of wider morality as well. In a dialogue, Thrasymachus argued that conventional morality was a ruse invented to keep the elite in power, which should be discarded in favour of self-interest. Plato responded by planning a utopia and giving a metaphysical theory of what is good. He argued there were five regimes into which different societies could be divided, with the best one being aristocracy, in which "the desires of the inferior many are controlled by the wisdom and desires of the superior few". In contrast, democracy would lead to the degradation of culture and morality, with him arguing that "extreme freedom can't be expected to lead to anything but a change to extreme slavery". Whereas ordinary people were living in an illusion, demonstrated by the allegory of the cave, the theory of forms suggested that objective definitions, as looked for by Socrates, did actually exist. The highest form was that of the Good, which gave purpose for everything in the world and could only be understood by the philosophers.

Aristotle's ethics builds upon Plato's with important variations. Aristotle defined the good as "that at which all things aim". While many different goods were being pursued by different people and activities, that good which is being pursued for its own sake was the supreme good, or what he called eudaimonia, which has been translated as 'happiness' but may be more broadly described as 'flourishing', and involves "living well and doing well", not mere pleasure (which will itself follow). A "great-souled" citizen who lives a life of virtue can expect to achieve eudaimonia, which Aristotle argues is the highest good for man. Following Plato, Aristotle gives a significant role in moral life to the virtues, fixed habits of behaviour that lead to good outcomes; the main virtues are courage, justice, prudence and temperance. The highest form of life is, however, purely intellectual activity. However, the virtues for him are merely the means to an end. Furthermore, he disagreed with Plato on there being a universal transcendental good, instead seeing ethics as practical and particular. Rather, the virtues should be based on finding the golden mean between extremes.

Later Greek schools of philosophy, such as the Epicureans and Stoics, debated the conditions of the good life. Both of these schools argued that tranquility should be the aim of life but disagreed on the means of getting there despite both claiming the Socratic tradition. Epicurus taught that the greatest good was pleasure and freedom from pain. However, the latter was more important, as indulgences should be avoided so they did not lead to want and therefore suffering. Instead, the Epicureans emphasized the quiet enjoyment of pleasures, especially mental pleasure, free of fear and anxiety. Founded by Zeno of Citium, the Stoics thought the greatest good not pleasure but reason and everything in accord with reason, even if painful. Hence, they praised the life of reason lived in accordance with nature. They had been influenced by the Cynics' and Socrates' ascetism and indifference to adversity. The acceptance of the inevitable subsequently became a key aspect of their thinking, based also on their belief in determinism. Whereas the Epicureans believed the universe was essentially meaningless, the Stoics believed that God (understood to be one with the universe) gave meaning to the world. In response to the problem of evil, the Stoics developed the concept of theodicy. The Stoic philosopher Hierocles also developed the concept of morality being based on concentric circles of proximity to the individual, such as family, community and humanity, with the process of bringing the self and the other together called Oikeiôsis.

== Indian ethics ==
The foundation of Hinduism is in the epic of Mahabharata, which contains the concept of dharma, a conception of natural law and the duties required for the upholding of the natural order. Hinduism itself is viewed by its followers as Sanātana Dharma, or the 'Eternal Law', which binds everyone. The four aims of Hinduism are moksha (enlightenment), artha (wealth), kama (pleasure), and dharma. The significance of moksha is that only it can break through maya, the illusion hiding reality, which requires both understanding the impermanence of material reality as well as the attainment of an understanding of the unity of the Self (atman) and the foundation of being (brahman). Moksha also means breaking free from the cycle of reincarnation which is governed by karma, the accumulated balance of good and bad actions by an individual. This was in turn used as a justification for the caste system. During the Axial Age, asceticism and becoming a hermit increased in popularity, sometimes being a reaction to the prevailing social structures. Two significant belief systems emerged from this reaction. Jainism, formalised by the ascetic philosopher Mahavira, according to which enlightenment came through a perfectly ethical life that necessitated a complete renunciation of the killing of any living beings, including the smallest of insects. The other one was Buddhism, founded by the Buddha. Other responses to the era included materialist schools such as Charvaka, which embraced hedonism and rejected spirituality.

The most important of the Buddha's teaching was the Dhammacakkappavattana Sutta, at the core of which were the Four Noble Truths. The first of these was duḥkha, the suffering that is part of life. This is also one of the three marks of existence which define life, the others being anitya, the impermanence of everything, and anatman, or the non-existence of the self across time. The second Noble Truth was that all human suffering is caused by desire that cannot be satisfied, and that only by renouncing the desire could the suffering be ended, which was the Third Noble Truth. The final Noble Truth was that desire could only be relinquished by following the Noble Eightfold Path. The Eightfold Path consists of eight practices: right view, right resolve, right speech, right conduct, right livelihood, right effort, right mindfulness, and right samadhi ('meditative absorption or union'; alternatively, equanimous meditative awareness). The Middle Way refers to major aspects of the teaching of the Buddha, either to the spiritual practice that steers clear of both extreme asceticism and sensual indulgence, which is defined as the Noble Eightfold Path, or the Buddha's avoiding of eternalism (or absolutism) and annihilationism (and nihilism). In Mahāyāna Buddhism, śūnyatā ('emptiness') refers to the tenet that "all things are empty of intrinsic existence and nature (svabhava)".

== Chinese ethics ==
Confucius, who lived around the same time as the Buddha, was focused mostly on ethical philosophy. He was especially interested in how to create a harmonious society, which he believed was based on two human qualities: ren and li. Ren, the highest principle, describes humaneness, encompassing all the qualities required for ideal behaviour between people. Confucious argued that a form of the Golden Rule should be the guiding principle of all actions. However, he also believed that different forms of behaviour were appropriate in different relationships. The second principle of li embodied this by establishing the need to follow tradition, rituals and other conventional norms.

== Natural law ethics ==
In the Middle Ages, Thomas Aquinas developed a synthesis of Biblical and Aristotelian ethics called natural law theory, according to which the nature of humans determines what is right and wrong. For example, murder is wrong because life is essential to humans so depriving someone of it is inherently an evil. Education is needed for humans, and is their right, because their intellectual nature requires developing. Natural law theory remains at the heart of Catholic moral teaching, for example in its positions on contraception and other controversial moral issues.

The Catholic practice of compulsory confession led to the development of manuals of casuistry, the application of ethical principles to detailed cases of conscience, such as the conditions of a just war.

== Kantian ethics ==
Immanuel Kant, in the 18th century, argued that right and wrong are founded on duty, which issues a Categorical Imperative to us, a command that, of its nature, ought to be obeyed. An action is only truly moral if done from a sense of duty, and the most valuable thing is a human will that has decided to act rightly. To decide what duty requires, Kant proposes the principle of universalizability: correct moral rules are those everyone could adopt.

Kant's philosophy marks a number of important conceptual shifts in philosophical thinking about ethics. Kant argues that questions about happiness should not be a focus in ethical thought, because ethics should be universal while happiness may involve very different modes of life for different individuals. He also believed this approach was necessary if an ethical theory was to avoid becoming 'heteronomous'; that is, locating the source of proper moral motivation outside of properly moral concerns.

== Utilitarianism ==
In 19th century Britain, Jeremy Bentham and John Stuart Mill advocated utilitarianism, the view that right actions are those that are likely to result in the greatest happiness and well-being of the greatest number. Utilitarianism remains popular in the twenty-first century.

Both Kantianism and Utilitarianism provide ethical theories that can support contemporary liberal political developments, and associated enlightenment ways of conceiving of the individual. Various variants of utilitarianism have developed this ethical system further, such as two-level utilitarianism, which combines considerations of the outcomes of principles and rules alongside those of individual acts or decisions, and negative utilitarianism, which is focused on minimizing the total amount of suffering rather than maximizing well-being.

== Twentieth century ==
The early twentieth century saw many debates on metaethics, that is, philosophical theory on the nature of ethics. Views ranged from moral realism, which holds that moral truths are about mind-independent realities, to evolutionary ethics, which believes ethical practices are merely evolved ways of behavior that led to evolutionary success, to the error theory of J. L. Mackie, which held that the entire notion of ethical obligation is a mistake.

Reflections on the Holocaust, such as those of Hannah Arendt, led to a deepening appreciation of the reality of extreme evil. The Holocaust impacted other Jewish philosophers immensely, for instance, the post-war period saw Emmanuel Levinas develop his 'ethics of the other' and situate ethics as 'first philosophy'. This philosophy showed a focus on the relation to the other in distress as central to the development of ethics and placed ethical theories center-stage in philosophy. Also, in reaction to the Holocaust, rights theories, as expressed for example in the 1948 Universal Declaration of Human Rights, asserted the inalienable moral rights of humans to life, education, and other basic goods. Another response to the atrocities of World War II included existential reflections on the meaning of life, leading to approaches of ethics based on "the situation" and personal interaction.

In the late 20th century, there was a so-called 'aretaic turn' and renewed interest in virtue ethics. This turn is often traced to a paper by G.E.M. Anscombe entitled "Modern Moral Philosophy". This approach was then furthered and popularized by figures such as Philippa Foot, Alasdair MacIntyre, Rosalind Hursthouse as well as Paul Ricoeur. The revival of this ethical position congruently saw a return to engagement with earlier philosophers associated with moral philosophy such as Thomas Aquinas and Aristotle.

== Professional and applied ethics ==
While mid-twentieth century ethics mostly dealt with theoretical issues, medical ethics continued to deal with issues of practice. The 1970s saw a revival of other fields of applied ethics, the consideration of detailed practical cases in bioethics, animal ethics, business ethics, environmental ethics, computer ethics and other speciality fields. The development of new technologies produced many new issues requiring ethical debate.

== See also ==
- Ethics in religion
- List of years in philosophy

== Sources ==
- MacIntyre, Alasdair (1998). A Short History of Ethics. London: Macmillan. ISBN 0-415-04027-2.
- Irwin, Terence (2007). The Development of Ethics. New York: Oxford University Press. ISBN 978-0-415-96824-9.
- Malik, Kenan (2014-05-01). The Quest for a Moral Compass: A Global History of Ethics. Atlantic Books. ISBN 978-1-78239-030-5.
- Vetter, Tilmann (1988). The Ideas and Meditative Practices of Early Buddhism. BRILL. ISBN 90-04-08959-4.
