= May Sim =

American philosopher (born 1962)

- Born: 1962 (age 63–64); Singapore

Education
- Education: Vanderbilt University (PhD, 1989)
- Thesis: Aristotle's Understanding of Form and Universals (1989)
- Doctoral advisor: Alasdair MacIntyre

Philosophical work
- Era: Contemporary philosophy
- School: Aristotelianism; Confucianism; Virtue ethics
- Institutions: Oklahoma State University; College of the Holy Cross
- Main interests: Ancient Greek philosophy; Chinese philosophy; Comparative philosophy; Ethics; Metaphysics; Human rights

May Sim (Chinese: 沈美华; born 1962) is a Singaporean-born American philosopher who is a professor of philosophy at the College of the Holy Cross. She served as the president of the Metaphysical Society of America in 2013. She is known for her comparative studies of Confucian and Aristotelian ethics as well as her account of human rights, which draw on Confucian and Aristotelian thought, philosophies not traditionally linked to talk of rights.

== Education ==
Sim received her Ph.D. in 1989 from Vanderbilt University, where she was influenced by Alasdair MacIntyre, her doctoral advisor. Sim's dissertation was titled, "Aristotle’s Understanding of Form and Universals".

== Publications ==
- Sim, May, ed. (1995). The Crossroads of Norm and Nature: Essays on Aristotle's Ethics and Metaphysics. Rowman & Littlefield. ISBN 0-8476-7939-X. OCLC 31328463.
- Sim, May (2007). Remastering Morals with Aristotle and Confucius. Cambridge University Press. doi:10.1017/CBO9780511497841. ISBN 978-0-511-29065-7. OCLC 213380426.
- Sim, May (December 6, 2017). "The Phronimos and the Sage". In Snow, Nancy E. (ed.). The Oxford Handbook of Virtue. Oxford University Press. doi:10.1093/oxfordhb/9780199385195.013.33. ISBN 9780199385195.
