= Whose Justice? Which Rationality? =

1988 book by Alasdair MacIntyre

- Author: Alasdair MacIntyre
- Language: English
- Subject: Ethics
- Publisher: University of Notre Dame Press
- Publication date: 1988
- ISBN: 978-0-268-01942-6

Whose Justice? Which Rationality? is a 1988 book of moral philosophy by the Scottish philosopher Alasdair MacIntyre. In the book, MacIntyre argues that there are a number of different and incompatible accounts of practical reasoning or rationality: those of Aristotle, Augustine, David Hume (and more broadly the "Scottish school"), and Thomas Aquinas. The differing accounts of justice that are presented by Aristotle and Hume, MacIntyre argues, are caused by the underlying differences in their conceptual schemes.

== See also ==
- After Virtue
- Virtue ethics
