= Modern Moral Philosophy =

1958 philosophy article by G. E. M. Anscombe

"Modern Moral Philosophy" is an article on moral philosophy by G. E. M. Anscombe, originally published in the journal Philosophy, vol. 33, no. 124 (January 1958).

The article has influenced the emergence of contemporary virtue ethics, especially through the work of Alasdair MacIntyre. Notably, the term "consequentialism" was coined in this paper, although in a different sense from the one in which it is now used.

== Theses ==
The beginning of the paper summarizes its main points:

I will begin by stating three theses which I present in this paper. The first is that it is not profitable for us at present to do moral philosophy; that should be laid aside at any rate until we have an adequate philosophy of psychology, in which we are conspicuously lacking. The second is that the concepts of obligation, and duty—moral obligation and moral duty, that is to say—and of what is morally right and wrong, and of the moral sense of 'ought', ought to be jettisoned if this is psychologically possible; because they are survivals, or derivatives from survivals, from an earlier conception of ethics which no longer generally survives, and are only harmful without it. My third thesis is that the differences between the well-known English writers on moral philosophy from Sidgwick to the present day are of little importance.

Onora O'Neill said that "the connections between these three thoughts are not immediately obvious, but their influence is not in doubt", and that "many exponents of virtue ethics take Anscombe's essay as a founding text and have endorsed all three thoughts", whereas "many contemporary consequentialists and theorists of justice, who may reasonably be thought the heirs of the 'modern moral philosophy' that Anscombe criticized, have disputed or disregarded all three".

== Coinage of "consequentialism" ==
In "Modern Moral Philosophy", Anscombe coined the term "consequentialism" to mark a distinction between theories of English moral philosophers from Sidgwick onward ("consequentialists") and theories of earlier philosophers. According to Anscombe, the modern "consequentialist" moral philosophers were distinguished from the earlier ones by that their theories allow actions, once they fall under a moral principle or (secondary) rule, to be treated, in practical deliberation, as if they were consequences—objects of maximization and weighing—, such that an unjust act, in spite of being generally prohibited and, prima facie, wrong under one aspect, might, nevertheless, be, all things considered, right, if it produces the greatest balance of happiness, or balance of prima facie rightness over prima facie wrongness. In consequentialism, so construed, there are no actions which are absolutely ruled out in advance of deliberation; everything might, in principle, be outweighed in some circumstances. Anscombe's goal was to advance an objection against all theories with this property.

As a result of this conception of consequentialism, Anscombe explicitly classified J.S. Mill as a nonconsequentialist and W.D. Ross as a consequentialist, since she thought that Mill's theories did not allow for this, whereas Ross's did. However, from a contemporary perspective, Mill and Ross would be classified the other way round—Mill as a consequentialist, and Ross as a nonconsequentialist. This is not because people have come to think that J.S. Mill satisfies the property that Anscombe thought was distinctive of modern consequentialists, and that W.D. Ross does not; rather, it is because the meaning of the word "consequentialism" has changed over time.

== Reception ==
According to M.J. Richter, "Kurt Baier describes the paper as 'widely discussed and much admired' and Peter Winch has called one of its three theses 'enormously influential' within moral philosophy."

John Wardle argued that Anscombe misrepresented Henry Sidgwick's understanding of the concept of humility when she concludes that it is "a species of untruthfulness".

Michael Thompson said that a theory of "natural normativity", or "natural goodness", was "sketched in the concluding paragraphs of" Anscombe's essay, and later "developed in the last part of" Rosalind Hursthouse's book On Virtue Ethics, and then in Philippa Foot's book Natural Goodness.

Roger Crisp argued that "historical and philosophical analysis throw some doubt" on Anscombe's "main thesis, which concerns the moral concepts", but that her "strategy of examining the moral concepts before using them in moral theory is helpful", and that "the application of that strategy to the very notion of morality itself supports something closer to the 'consequentialist' position she attacks in her paper than to her own."

Sabina Lovibond said that "Elizabeth Anscombe's 'Modern Moral Philosophy' is read and remembered principally as a critique of the state of ethical theory at the time when she was writing—an account of certain faulty assumptions underlying that theory in its different variants, and rendering trivial the points on which they ostensibly disagree."

Thomas Pink criticized Anscombe's idea that the concept of a distinctively moral obligation only makes sense in the context of belief in a divine law-giver.

== See also ==
- "The Schizophrenia of Modern Ethical Theories"

== Sources ==
- "Virtue Ethics" – Internet Encyclopedia of Philosophy
