= Aristotelianism =

Philosophical tradition inspired by the work of Aristotle

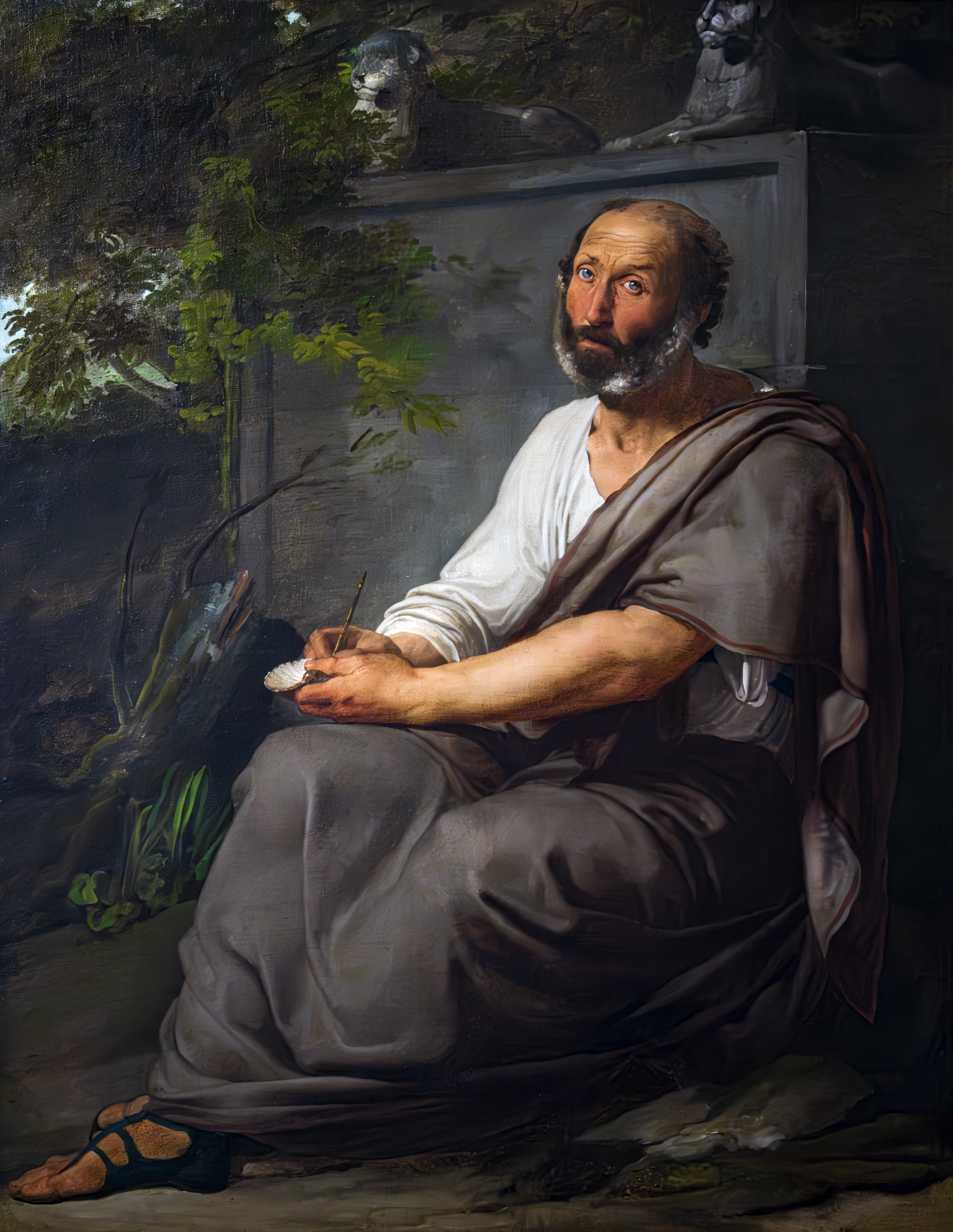
Aristotle by Francesco Hayez, 1811

Aristotelianism (/ˌærɪstəˈtiːliənɪzəm/ ARR-i-stə-TEE-lee-ə-niz-əm) is a philosophical tradition inspired by the work of Aristotle, usually characterized by deductive logic and an analytic inductive method in the study of natural philosophy and metaphysics. It covers the treatment of the social sciences under a system of natural law. It answers why-questions by a scheme of four causes, including purpose or telos, and emphasizes virtue ethics. Aristotle and his school wrote tractates on physics, biology, metaphysics, logic, ethics, aesthetics, poetry, theatre, music, rhetoric, psychology, linguistics, economics, politics, and government. Any school of thought that takes one of Aristotle's distinctive positions as its starting point can be considered "Aristotelian" in the widest sense. This means that different Aristotelian theories (e.g. in ethics or in ontology) may not have much in common as far as their actual content is concerned besides their shared reference to Aristotle.

In Aristotle's time, philosophy included natural philosophy, which preceded the advent of modern science during the Scientific Revolution. The works of Aristotle were initially defended by the members of the Peripatetic school and later on by the Neoplatonists, who produced many commentaries on Aristotle's writings. In the Islamic Golden Age, Avicenna and Averroes translated the works of Aristotle into Arabic and under them, along with philosophers such as Al-Kindi and Al-Farabi, Aristotelianism became a major part of early Islamic philosophy.

Moses Maimonides adopted Aristotelianism from the Islamic scholars and based his Guide for the Perplexed on it and that became the basis of Jewish scholastic philosophy. Although some of Aristotle's logical works were known to western Europe, it was not until the Latin translations of the 12th century and the rise of scholasticism that the works of Aristotle and his Arabic commentators became widely available. Scholars such as Albertus Magnus and Thomas Aquinas interpreted and systematized Aristotle's works in accordance with Catholic theology.

After retreating under criticism from modern natural philosophers, the distinctively Aristotelian idea of teleology was transmitted through Wolff and Kant to Hegel, who applied it to history conceived as a whole. However, this project was criticized by Trendelenburg and Brentano as non-Aristotelian; yet Hegel's influence is often regarded as a major source of Aristotelian themes in Marx.

Recent Aristotelian ethical and "practical" philosophy, such as that of Gadamer and McDowell, is often premised upon a rejection of Aristotelianism's traditional metaphysical or theoretical philosophy. From this viewpoint, the early modern tradition of political republicanism, which views the res publica, public sphere or state as constituted by its citizens' virtuous activity, can appear thoroughly Aristotelian.

Alasdair MacIntyre was a notable modern Aristotelian philosopher who helped to revive virtue ethics in his book After Virtue. MacIntyre revises Aristotelianism with the argument that the highest temporal goods, which are internal to human beings, are actualized through participation in social practices.

== History ==
=== Ancient Greek ===
The original followers of Aristotle were the members of the Peripatetic school. The most prominent members of the school after Aristotle were Theophrastus and Strato of Lampsacus, who both continued Aristotle's researches. During the Roman era, the school concentrated on preserving and defending his work. The most important figure in this regard was Alexander of Aphrodisias who commentated on Aristotle's writings. With the rise of Neoplatonism in the 3rd century, Peripateticism as an independent philosophy came to an end. Still, the Neoplatonists sought to incorporate Aristotle's philosophy within their own system and produced many commentaries on Aristotle.

=== Byzantine Empire ===
Byzantine Aristotelianism emerged in the Byzantine Empire in the two decades after 1118 through the initiative of the princess Anna Comnena, who commissioned a number of scholars to write commentaries on previously neglected works of Aristotle. Michael of Ephesus wrote commentaries on the works of Aristotle's animal biology, on the Sophistical Refutations, the only work of the Organon not to have a commentary, and the Politics, completing the series of commentaries on Aristotle's extant works. Byzantine philosophers also filled in the gaps in the commentaries that had survived down to their time; Alexander of Aphrodisias' commentary on the Metaphysics, of which only the first five books survived, was completed by Michael of Ephesus, who, along with Eustratius, compiled a number of fragmentary commentaries on the Nicomachean Ethics which they supplemented with their own interpretations.

=== Islamic world ===
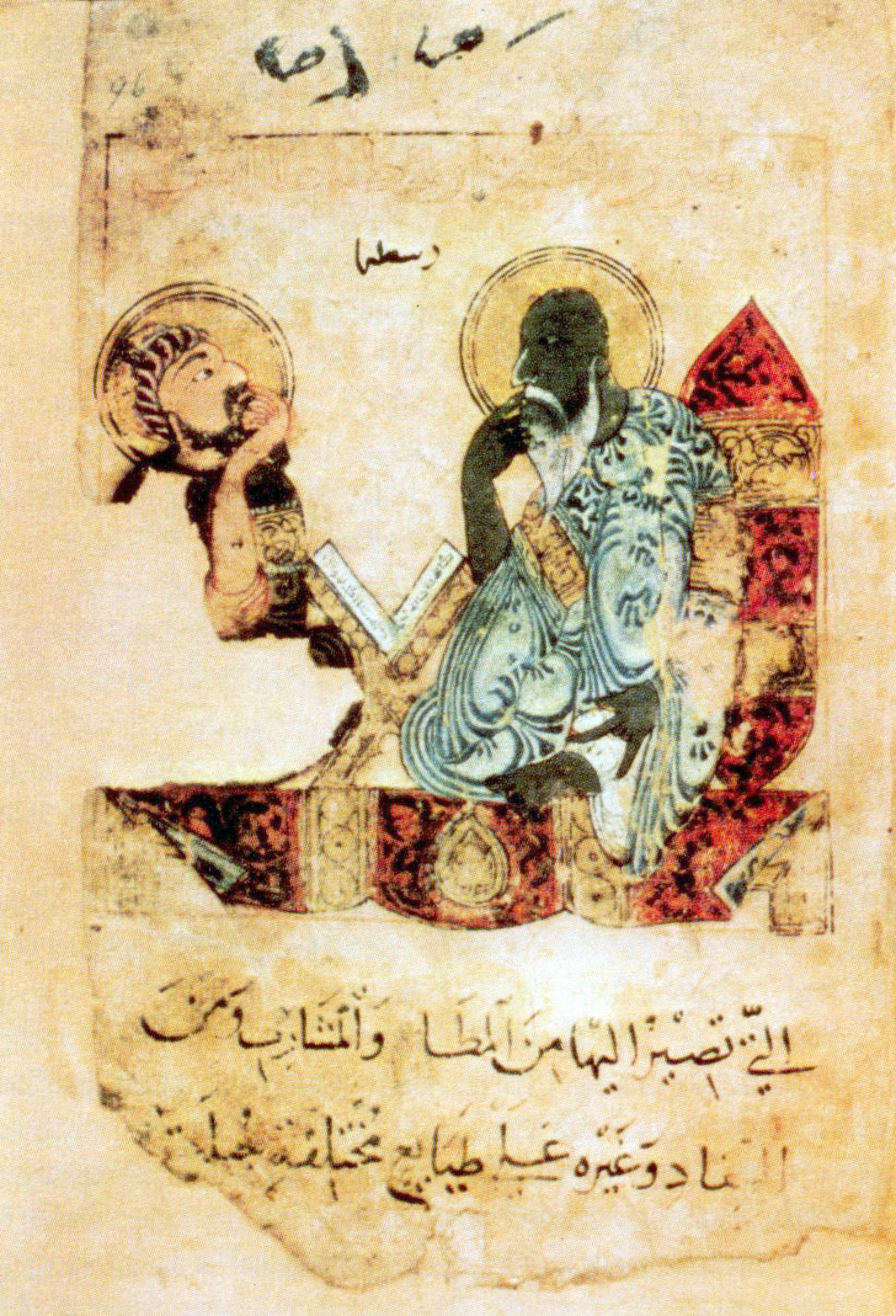
A medieval Arabic representation of Aristotle teaching a student.

In the Abbasid Empire, many foreign works were translated into Arabic, large libraries were constructed, and scholars were welcomed. Under the caliphs Harun al-Rashid and his son Al-Ma'mun, the House of Wisdom in Baghdad flourished. Christian scholar Hunayn ibn Ishaq (809–873) was placed in charge of the translation work by the caliph. In his lifetime, Ishaq translated 116 writings, including works by Plato and Aristotle, into Syriac and Arabic.

With the founding of House of Wisdom, the entire corpus of Aristotelian works that had been preserved (excluding the Eudemian Ethics, Magna Moralia and Politics) became available, along with its Greek commentators; this corpus laid a uniform foundation for Islamic Aristotelianism.

Al-Kindi (801–873) was the first of the Muslim Peripatetic philosophers and is known for his efforts to introduce Greek and Hellenistic philosophy to the Arab world. He incorporated Aristotelian and Neoplatonist thought into an Islamic philosophical framework. This was an important factor in the introduction and popularization of Greek philosophy in the Muslim intellectual world. In the 9th century, Persian astrologer Albumasarl's Introductorium in Astronomiam was one of the most important sources for the recovery of Aristotle for medieval European scholars.

The philosopher Al-Farabi (872–950) had great influence on science and philosophy for several centuries, and in his time was widely thought second only to Aristotle in knowledge (alluded to by his title of "the Second Teacher"). His work, aimed at synthesis of philosophy and Sufism, paved the way for the work of Avicenna (980–1037). Avicenna was one of the main interpreters of Aristotle. The school of thought he founded became known as Avicennism, which was built on ingredients and conceptual building blocks that are largely Aristotelian and Neoplatonist.

At the western end of the Mediterranean Sea, during the reign of Al-Hakam II (961 to 976) in Córdoba, a massive translation effort was undertaken, and many books were translated into Arabic. Averroes (1126–1198), who spent much of his life in Cordoba and Seville, was especially distinguished as a commentator of Aristotle. He often wrote two or three different commentaries on the same work, and some 38 commentaries by Averroes on the works of Aristotle have been identified. Although his writings had an only marginal impact in Islamic countries, his works would eventually have a huge impact in the Latin West, and would lead to the school of thought known as Averroism.

=== Western Europe ===
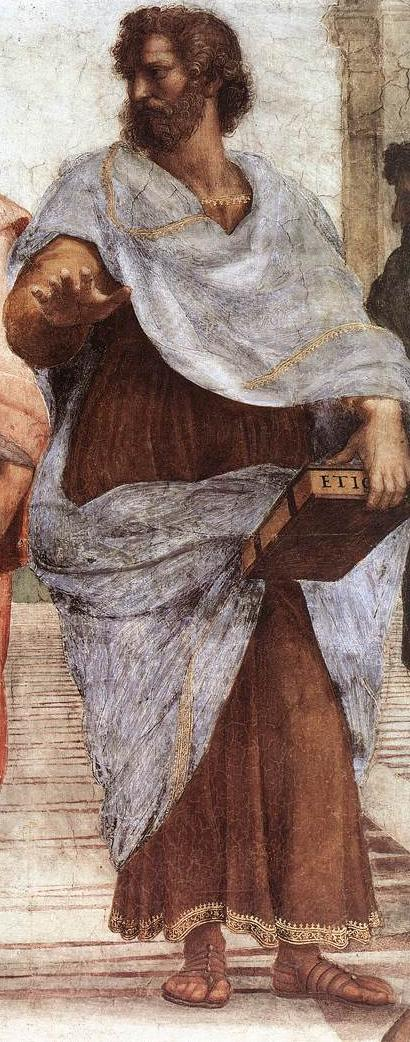
Aristotle, holding his Ethics (detail from The School of Athens)

Although some knowledge of Aristotle seems to have lingered on in the ecclesiastical centres of western Europe after the fall of the Roman empire, by the ninth century, nearly all that was known of Aristotle consisted of Boethius's commentaries on the Organon, and a few abridgments made by Latin authors of the declining empire, Isidore of Seville and Martianus Capella. From that time until the end of the eleventh century, little progress is apparent in Aristotelian knowledge.

The renaissance of the 12th century saw a major search by European scholars for new learning. James of Venice, who probably spent some years in Constantinople, translated Aristotle's Posterior Analytics from Greek into Latin in the mid-twelfth century, thus making the complete Aristotelian logical corpus, the Organon, available in Latin for the first time. Scholars travelled to areas of Europe that once had been under Muslim rule and still had substantial Arabic-speaking populations. From central Spain, which had returned to Christian rule in the eleventh century, scholars produced many of the Latin translations of the 12th century. The most productive of these translators was Gerard of Cremona, (c. 1114–1187), who translated 87 books, which included many of the works of Aristotle such as his Posterior Analytics, Physics, On the Heavens, On Generation and Corruption, and Meteorology. Michael Scot (c. 1175–1232) translated Averroes' commentaries on the scientific works of Aristotle.

Aristotle's physical writings began to be discussed openly. At a time when Aristotle's method was permeating all theology, these treatises were sufficient to cause his prohibition for heterodoxy in the Condemnations of 1210–1277. In the first of these, in Paris in 1210, it was stated that "neither the books of Aristotle on natural philosophy or their commentaries are to be read at Paris in public or secret, and this we forbid under penalty of ex-communication." However, despite further attempts to restrict the teaching of Aristotle, by 1270, the ban on Aristotle's natural philosophy was ineffective.

William of Moerbeke (c. 1215–1286) undertook a complete translation of the works of Aristotle or, for some portions, a revision of existing translations. He was the first translator of the Politics (c. 1260) from Greek into Latin. Many copies of Aristotle in Latin then in circulation were assumed to have been influenced by Averroes, who was suspected of being a source of philosophical and theological errors found in the earlier translations of Aristotle. Such claims were without merit, however, as the Alexandrian Aristotelianism of Averroes followed "the strict study of the text of Aristotle, which was introduced by Avicenna, [because] a large amount of traditional Neoplatonism was incorporated with the body of traditional Aristotelianism".

Albertus Magnus (c. 1200–1280) was among the first medieval scholars to apply Aristotle's philosophy to Christian thought. He produced paraphrases of most of the works of Aristotle available to him. He digested, interpreted and systematized the whole of Aristotle's works, gleaned from the Latin translations and notes of the Arabian commentators, in accordance with Church doctrine. His efforts resulted in the formation of a Christian reception of Aristotle in the Western Europe. Albertus did not repudiate Plato. In that, he belonged to the dominant tradition of philosophy that preceded him, namely the "concordist tradition", which sought to harmonize Aristotle with Plato through interpretation (see for example Porphyry's On Plato and Aristotle Being Adherents of the Same School). Albertus famously wrote:

"Scias quod non perficitur homo in philosophia nisi ex scientia duarum philosophiarum: Aristotelis et Platonis." (Metaphysics, I, tr. 5, c. 5) (Know that a man is not perfected in philosophy if it weren't for the knowledge of the two philosophers, Aristotle and Plato)

Thomas Aquinas (1225–1274), the pupil of Albertus Magnus, wrote a dozen commentaries on the works of Aristotle. Thomas was emphatically Aristotelian, he adopted Aristotle's analysis of physical objects, his view of place, time and motion, his proof of the prime mover, his cosmology, his account of sense perception and intellectual knowledge, and even parts of his moral philosophy. The philosophical school that arose as a legacy of the work of Thomas Aquinas was known as Thomism, and was especially influential among the Dominicans, and later, the Jesuits.

Using Albert's and Thomas's commentaries, as well as Marsilius of Padua's Defensor pacis, 14th-century scholar Nicole Oresme translated Aristotle's moral works into French and wrote extensively comments on them.

=== Modern era ===
After retreating under criticism from modern natural philosophers, the distinctively Aristotelian idea of teleology was transmitted through Wolff and Kant to Hegel, who applied it to history as a totality. Although this project was criticized by Trendelenburg and Brentano as un-Aristotelian, Hegel had an exceptional admiration for Aristotle who often served as an exemplar in key passages of Hegel's work.

Hegel's influence is now often said to be responsible for an important Aristotelian influence upon Marx. Postmodernists, in contrast, reject Aristotelianism's claim to reveal important theoretical truths. In this, they follow Heidegger's critique of Aristotle as the greatest source of the entire tradition of Western philosophy.

== Contemporary ==
=== Ethics ===
Aristotelianism is understood by its proponents as critically developing Plato's theories. Some recent Aristotelian ethical and 'practical' philosophy, such as that of Gadamer and McDowell, is often premised upon a rejection of Aristotelianism's traditional metaphysical or theoretical philosophy. From this viewpoint, the early modern tradition of political republicanism, which views the res publica, public sphere or state as constituted by its citizens' virtuous activity, can appear thoroughly Aristotelian.

Mortimer J. Adler described Aristotle's Nicomachean Ethics as a "unique book in the Western tradition of moral philosophy, the only ethics that is sound, practical, and undogmatic."

The contemporary Aristotelian philosopher Alasdair MacIntyre helped to revive virtue ethics in his book After Virtue. MacIntyre revises Aristotelianism with the argument that the highest temporal goods, which are internal to human beings, are actualized through participation in social practices. He opposes Aristotelianism to the managerial institutions of capitalism and its state, and to rival traditions—including the philosophies of Hume, Kant, Kierkegaard, and Nietzsche—that reject its idea of essentially human goods and virtues and instead legitimize capitalism. Therefore, on MacIntyre's account, Aristotelianism is not identical with Western philosophy as a whole; rather, it is "the best theory so far, [including] the best theory so far about what makes a particular theory the best one." Politically and socially, it has been characterized as a newly 'revolutionary Aristotelianism'. This may be contrasted with the more conventional, apolitical, and effectively conservative uses of Aristotle by, for example, Gadamer and McDowell. Other important contemporary Aristotelian theorists include Fred D. Miller, Jr. in politics and Rosalind Hursthouse in ethics.

=== Meta-ontology ===
Neo-Aristotelianism in meta-ontology holds that the goal of ontology is to determine which entities are fundamental and how the non-fundamental entities depend on them. The concept of fundamentality is usually defined in terms of metaphysical grounding. Fundamental entities are different from non-fundamental entities because they are not grounded in other entities. For example, it is sometimes held that elementary particles are more fundamental than the macroscopic objects (like chairs and tables) they compose. This is a claim about the grounding-relation between microscopic and macroscopic objects.

These ideas go back to Aristotle's thesis that entities from different ontological categories have different degrees of fundamentality. For example, substances have the highest degree of fundamentality because they exist in themselves. Properties, on the other hand, are less fundamental because they depend on substances for their existence.

Jonathan Schaffer's priority monism is a recent form of neo-Aristotelian ontology. He holds that there exists only one thing on the most fundamental level: the world as a whole. This thesis does not deny our common-sense intuition that the distinct objects we encounter in our everyday affairs like cars or other people exist. It only denies that these objects have the most fundamental form of existence.

=== Problem of universals ===
The problem of universals is the question of whether and in what way universals exist. Aristotelians and Platonists agree that universals have actual, mind-independent existence; thus they oppose the nominalist standpoint. Aristotelians disagree with Platonists, however, about the mode of existence of universals. Platonists hold that universals exist in some form of "Platonic heaven" and thus exist independently of their instances in the concrete, spatiotemporal world. Aristotelians, on the other hand, deny the existence of universals outside the spatiotemporal world. This view is known as immanent realism. For example, the universal "red" exists only insofar as there are red objects in the concrete world. Were there no red objects there would be no red-universal. This immanence can be conceived in terms of the theory of hylomorphism by seeing objects as composed of a universal form and the matter shaped by it.

David Malet Armstrong was a modern defender of Aristotelianism on the problem of universals. States of affairs are the basic building blocks of his ontology, and have particulars and universals as their constituents. Armstrong is an immanent realist in the sense that he holds that a universal exists only insofar as it is a constituent of at least one actual state of affairs. Universals without instances are not part of the world.

Taking a realist approach to universals also allows an Aristotelian realist philosophy of mathematics, according to which mathematics is a science of properties that are instantiated in the real (including physical) world, such as quantitative and structural properties.

== See also ==
- Aristotelian ethics
- Aristotelian physics
- Commentaries on Aristotle
- Corpus Aristotelicum
- Phronesis
- Platonism
- Wheel of fire
