= After Virtue =

1981 book by Alasdair MacIntyre

- Cover of the first edition
- Author: Alasdair MacIntyre
- Subject: Ethics
- Published: 1981 (University of Notre Dame Press)
- ISBN: 978-0-268-00594-8

After Virtue: A Study in Moral Theory is a book on moral philosophy by the Scottish philosopher Alasdair MacIntyre. MacIntyre provides a bleak view of the state of modern moral discourse, regarding it as failing to be rational, and failing to admit to being irrational. He claims that older forms of moral discourse were in better shape, particularly singling out Aristotle's moral philosophy as an exemplar. After Virtue is among the most important texts in the 20th-century revival of virtue ethics.

The book was first published in 1981 and has since gone through two subsequent editions, which have added to, but not changed, the original text. The second edition, published in 1984, adds a postscript replying to critics of the first edition; the third edition, published in 2007, contains a new prologue entitled "After Virtue After a Quarter of a Century".

== Summary ==
MacIntyre holds that After Virtue makes seven central claims. It begins with an allegory suggestive of the premise of the science-fiction novel A Canticle for Leibowitz: a world where all sciences have been dismantled quickly and almost entirely. MacIntyre asks what the sciences would look like if they were re-assembled from the remnants of scientific knowledge that survived the catastrophe.

He claims that the new sciences, though superficially similar to the old, would in fact be devoid of real scientific content, because the key suppositions and attitudes would not be present. "The hypothesis which I wish to advance", he continues, "is that in the actual world which we inhabit the language of morality is in the same state of grave disorder as the language of natural science in the imaginary world which I described." Specifically, MacIntyre applies this hypothesis to advance the notion that the moral structures that emerged from the Enlightenment were philosophically doomed from the start because they were formed using the aforementioned incoherent language of morality. MacIntyre claims that this failure encompasses the work of many significant Enlightenment and post-Enlightenment moral philosophers, including Søren Kierkegaard, Karl Marx, Immanuel Kant, and David Hume. These philosophers "fail because of certain shared characteristics deriving from their highly specific historical background." That background is the Enlightenment's abandonment of Aristotelianism, and in particular the Aristotelian concept of teleology.

Ancient and medieval ethics, argues MacIntyre, relied wholly on the teleological idea that human life had a proper end or character, and that human beings could not reach this natural end without preparation. Renaissance science rejected Aristotle's teleological physics as an incorrect and unnecessary account, which led Renaissance philosophy to make a similar rejection in the realm of ethics. But shorn of teleology, ethics as a body of knowledge was expurgated of its central content, and only remained as, essentially, a vocabulary list with few definitions and no context. With such an incomplete framework on which to base their moral understanding, the philosophers of the Enlightenment and their successors were doomed from the beginning.

MacIntyre illustrates this point through an example of a people who, he argues, experienced a similar incoherence in their own moral and ethical tradition: the Polynesian people of the South Pacific and their taboos. King Kamehameha II removed the taboos of the people in order to modernize their society and met little if any resistance. The Polynesians had no issue with abandoning their long-standing cultural traditions and MacIntyre claims this is because the taboos, though once meaningful to the islanders, had been shorn over the centuries of their underlying spiritual and didactic purpose, becoming a set of arbitrary prohibitions. The fact that Kamehameha II could abolish them so easily and without opposition is evidence, MacIntyre argues, of their incoherence. A similar incoherence, he argues, bedevils the ethical project since the Enlightenment.

Another reason MacIntyre gives for the doomed nature of the Enlightenment is the fact that it ascribed moral agency to the individual. He claims this made morality no more than one man's opinion and, thus, philosophy became a forum of inexplicably subjective rules and principles. The failure of the Enlightenment Project, because of the abandonment of a teleological structure, is shown by the inadequacy of moral emotivism, which MacIntyre believes accurately reflects the state of modern morality.

MacIntyre offers a critique of Friedrich Nietzsche, whom he calls the "King Kamehameha II of the European tradition," in reference to the Polynesian allegory above. MacIntyre explains that, "Nietzschean man, the Übermensch, [is] the man who transcends, finds his good nowhere in the social world to date, but only that in himself which dictates his own new law and his own new table of the virtues." Although he disagreed with Nietzsche's inegalitarian and elitist view of humankind, he acknowledged the validity of Nietzsche's critique of Enlightenment morality as an explanation of the latter's degeneration into emotivism, and that, like Kamehameha II, Nietzsche had identified the moral imperatives of his time as arbitrary and incoherent in demanding their abolition.

The nineteenth-century critic who has most lastingly and profoundly influenced MacIntyre is not Nietzsche but Marx—indeed, After Virtue originates in MacIntyre's plans to write a book repairing the moral weaknesses of Marxism. His critique of capitalism, and its associated liberal ideology and bureaucratic state (including what, in After Virtue, he condemned as the state capitalism of the USSR) is not expressed in traditional Marxist terms. Instead, it is written as a defence of ordinary social "practices", and of the "goods internal to practices". Pursuit of these helps to give narrative structure and intelligibility to our lives, but these goods must be defended against their corruption by "institutions", which pursue such "external goods" as money, power and status (chapters 14–15).

MacIntyre seeks to find an alternative to Nietzsche's philosophy and eventually concludes that only classic Aristotelian thought can hope to save Western humanity. While Nietzsche seems to include the Aristotelian ethics and politics in his attack on the "degenerate disguises of the will to power," MacIntyre claims that this cannot be done due to important differences between the structure and assumptions of Aristotelian and post-Enlightenment philosophy. These include:

- Aristotle's assumption that man is as-he-happens-to-be and that this is distinct from man-as-he-should-be. The Enlightenment, on the other hand, offers no metaphysical framework whatsoever in place of teleology.
- Aristotle's claim that rules are based on virtues, which are derived from an understanding of the telos. The Enlightenment reversed this and predicated virtues on an understanding of subjective (but purported to be universal) principles.
- Aristotle's assertion that virtue and morality are integral parts of society, as an understanding of the telos must be social and not individual. In the Enlightenment, however, societies lost their moral authority and the individual became the fundamental interpreter of moral questions.

MacIntyre opposes Nietzsche's return to the aristocratic ethics of Homeric Greece with the teleological approach to ethics pioneered by Aristotle. Nietzsche's critique of Enlightenment moral theory does not work against a teleological ethics. For MacIntyre, "Nietzsche replaces the fictions of the Enlightenment individualism, of which he is so contemptuous, with a set of individualist fictions of his own." Nietzsche's Übermensch, his solution to the lies of the Enlightenment, exposes the failure of the Enlightenment's epistemological project and of its search for a subjective yet universal morality. Nietzsche neglects the role of society in the formation and understanding of tradition and morality, and "Nietzsche's great man cannot enter into relationships mediated by appeal to shared standards or virtues or goods; he is his own only moral authority and his relationships to others have to be exercises of that authority... it will be to condemn oneself to that moral solipsism which constitutes Nietzschean greatness."

After Virtue ends by posing the question 'Nietzsche or Aristotle?', although MacIntyre acknowledges that the book does not give sufficient grounds for a definitive answer that it is Aristotle, not Nietzsche, who points to the best solution for the problems that the book has diagnosed. Those grounds are set out in MacIntyre's subsequent works, in which he elaborates a sophisticated revision of the philosophical tradition of Aristotelianism.

In the end, however, MacIntyre tells us that we are waiting not for Godot but for Benedict of Nursia. MacIntyre criticizes individualist political philosophy, such as John Rawls' A Theory of Justice and Robert Nozick's Anarchy, State, and Utopia. To MacIntyre, morals and virtues can only be comprehended through their relation to the community which they come from. Whereas Rawls tells us to conceive of justice through abstracting ourselves from who we are (through the veil of ignorance, for example) MacIntyre disagrees. Running throughout After Virtue is the belief that in order to comprehend who we are, we must understand where we come from.

== Reception ==
The critic George Scialabba found After Virtue to be a strong critique of modernity, but claimed that MacIntyre "faltered" at the conclusion of the argument, when he sketched the features of what virtuous life should be like in the conditions of modernity. In particular, Scialabba objected to MacIntyre's claim that the good life for human beings consists in contemplating the good life for human beings; Scialabba found this insufficient and anticlimactic. Scialabba also argued that, although he appreciated MacIntyre's insistence on participation in community life as the best defense against the perils of modernity, this insistence was not justified with any discussion of how community life can be reconciled with the critical spirit that Scialabba finds to be one of the great achievements of modernity and of the philosophical enterprise.

In a review for Political Theory, William E. Connolly argues that MacIntyre sees Nietzsche as "the adversary to be defeated, but Nietzsche's voice is not heard clearly." Connolly objects that MacIntyre's defense of virtue does not take into account Nietzsche's critique; MacIntyre also fails to build an account of telos that does not draw on biology in the way MacIntyre wanted to avoid—such a theory does not account for the fact that we are embodied.

Anthony Ellis, in the journal Philosophy, argued that MacIntyre's positive philosophical project is not explained as well as it could have been: it is "of daunting opacity, though tantalizingly interesting" but not given enough space in the book. Ellis also states that the discussion of Rawls and Nozick in After Virtue "is slight and assertive".

In the Review of Metaphysics, Christos Evangeliou said that if the reader "had expected to find in this book concretely how a revived Aristotelian tradition is supposed to work in order to shape ethically and rationally the irrational and disorderly modern world", they "may be a little disappointed in their expectations".

== See also ==
- Whose Justice? Which Rationality?
- Predecessor culture
