= Predecessor culture =

"Predecessor culture" is a sociological phrase originating in Alasdair MacIntyre's book, After Virtue, in which he considers society before the Enlightenment's project of rationalizing all things as having an internal consistency and meaning which has been lost to us. It can be considered as having to do with the set of heroes and stories that were re-iterated in former cultures; these are called commonplaces in English literature.

Another use of the phrase is to refer to society before the 1960s. Not only is this considered in opposition to the sexual revolution, and various political movements and the manner in which power is expressed, such as the ways in which society is intended to accommodate feminism, but with the philosophical changes such as structuralism and post-structuralism.
