= No Morality, No Self =

Philosophy book

No Morality, No Self: Anscombe's Radical Skepticism
- Author: James Doyle
- ISBN: 978-0-674-97650-4

No Morality, No Self: Anscombe’s Radical Skepticism (ISBN 978-0-674-97650-4) is a philosophy book written by James Doyle about G. E. M. Anscombe; it was published by Harvard University Press in 2018.
