= Fred Miller (philosopher) =

American philosopher (born 1944)

Fred Dycus Miller Jr. (born 1944) is an American philosopher who specializes in Aristotelian philosophy, with additional interests in political philosophy, business ethics, metaphysics, and philosophy in science fiction. He is a professor emeritus at Bowling Green State University.

== Education and career ==
Miller is a 1966 graduate of Portland State University. and earned a Ph.D. in 1971 at the University of Washington. He took a faculty position at Bowling Green State University in 1972, was promoted to associate professor in 1977, and to full professor in 1982. He was executive director of the university's Social Philosophy and Policy Center from 1981 to 2012. He retired as a professor emeritus in 2013.

He served as president of the Society for Ancient Greek Philosophy from 1998 to 2004.

== Books ==
Miller is the author of Nature, Justice, and Rights in Aristotle's Politics (Clarendon Press, 1995). He is the translator of Aristotle's On the Soul: and Other Psychological Works (Oxford World's Classics, Oxford University Press, 2018), and of 'Alexander': On Aristotle Metaphysics 12 (Bloomsbury, 2021).

His edited volumes include:

- Human Rights (edited with Ellen Frankel Paul and Jeffrey Paul, Oxford University Press, 1984)
- Ethics & Economics (edited with Ellen Frankel Paul and Jeffrey Paul, Blackwell, 1985)
- A Companion to Aristotle's Politics (edited with David Keyt, Blackwell, 1991)
- The Good Life and the Human Good (edited with Ellen Frankel Paul and Jeffrey Paul, Cambridge University Press, 1992)
- Economic Rights (edited with Ellen Frankel Paul and Jeffrey Paul, Cambridge University Press, 1992)
- Altruism (edited with Ellen Frankel Paul and Jeffrey Paul, Cambridge University Press, 1993)
- Liberalism and the Economic Order (edited with Ellen Frankel Paul and Jeffrey Paul, Cambridge University Press, 1993)
- Property Rights (edited with Ellen Frankel Paul and Jeffrey Paul, Cambridge University Press, 1994)
- Cultural Pluralism and Moral Knowledge (edited with Ellen Frankel Paul and Jeffrey Paul, Cambridge University Press, 1994)
- Contemporary Political and Social Philosophy (edited with Ellen Frankel Paul and Jeffrey Paul, Cambridge University Press, 1995)
- Scientific Innovation, Philosophy, and Public Policy (edited with Ellen Frankel Paul and Jeffrey Paul, Cambridge University Press, 1996)
- Problems of Market Liberalism (edited with Ellen Frankel Paul and Jeffrey Paul, Cambridge University Press, 1998)
- Bioethics (edited with Ellen Frankel Paul and Jeffrey Paul, Cambridge University Press, 2002)
- Autonomy (edited with Ellen Frankel Paul and Jeffrey Paul, Cambridge University Press, 2003)
- Freedom, Reason, and the Polis: Essays in Ancient Greek Political Philosophy (edited with David Keyt, Cambridge University Press, 2007)
- Moral Obligation (edited with Ellen Frankel Paul and Jeffrey Paul, Cambridge University Press, 2010)
- Liberalism and Capitalism (edited with Ellen Frankel Paul and Jeffrey Paul, Cambridge University Press, 2012)
- Reason and Analysis in Ancient Greek Philosophy: Essays in Honor of David Keyt (edited with Georgios Anagnostopoulos, Springer, 2013)
