= A Short History of Ethics =

1966 book by Alasdair MacIntyre

- Author: Alasdair MacIntyre
- Language: English
- Subject: Ethics
- Genre: Philosophy
- Published: 1966 (Macmillan)

A Short History of Ethics: A History of Moral Philosophy from the Homeric Age to the Twentieth Century is a 1966 book on the history of moral philosophy by the Scottish philosopher Alasdair MacIntyre. It is the first of a series of books by MacIntyre on the history and development of ethics.

The book covers Greek ethics including Plato and Aristotle, Christian moral thought including the work of Martin Luther and writers including Niccolò Machiavelli, Montesquieu, Edmund Burke, Immanuel Kant, David Hume, Georg Wilhelm Friedrich Hegel, Karl Marx, Søren Kierkegaard, Arthur Schopenhauer and Friedrich Nietzsche. MacIntyre also discusses twentieth century philosophers including G. E. Moore, John Dewey and R. M. Hare.

According to a review in The Journal of Philosophy, one of MacIntyre's primary theses in the book is that "moral concepts change as social life changes" and therefore philosophers who believe there is one subject of ethical inquiry are mistaken. A review in the British Journal of Educational Studies describes the book as a "stimulating, if highly impressionistic, account of the history of ethics written from the point of view of his own convictions about the state of moral concepts".

In a review for The Philosophical Review, J. B. Schneewind describes the work as a "brilliant and provocative book" that is "not so much a history of ethics as an essay about the history of ethics". Schneewind criticises some elements of the book, noting the absence of any discussion of Henry Sidgwick and also noting MacIntyre's lack of references or bibliography or of careful exposition of some of the issues of interpretation in the history of ethics.
