= Acting under a description =

Concept of the intentionality of human action

Acting under a description is a conception of the intentionality of human action introduced by philosopher G. E. M. Anscombe.

== G. E. M. Anscombe ==
Anscombe wrote that a human action is intentional if the question "Why?", taken in a certain sense (and evidently conceived as addressed to him), has application (Intention, par. 5-8). An agent can answer the "Why?" question by giving a reason or purpose for her action. "To do Y" or "because I want to do Y" would be typical answers to this sort of "Why?"; though they are not the only ones, they are crucial to the constitution of the phenomenon as a typical phenomenon of human life (sections 18-21). The agent's answer helps supply the descriptions under which the action is intentional. Moreover, the act is known without observation (Intention, section. 28). For example, a person knows without observation that their hands are pushing upwards and when asked what they are doing, they say they are opening the window. Hence, in their hands pushing upwards, they are opening the window; opening a window being a description of the intentional act.

Anscombe was the first to clearly spell out that actions are intentional under some descriptions and not others. In her famous example, a man's action (which we might observe as consisting in moving an arm up and down while holding a handle) may be intentional under the description "pumping water" but not under other descriptions such as "contracting these muscles", "tapping out this rhythm", etc.

== Ian Hacking ==
The implications of this philosophy of intentional action were extended by Ian Hacking. His argument is as follows: people talk about themselves as intentional beings. Descriptions of acts are almost always descriptions of how an act was intended. A person offers an explanation of why he or she acts thus and so. The array of descriptions available to an individual depend on the descriptions available to the society in which the individual resides. Hence, the media, the expertise of psychologists, physicians and scientists as well as the folk understandings of cultural communities all provide descriptions; descriptions that can be assumed by an individual as he or she acts.

Acting under a description has important implications for interpreting our selves. Self-understanding involves understanding our acts and hence understanding the descriptions under which we act. This issue has been illustrated with discussions of particular cases such as autism and dissociative identity disorder. In contemporary society, the descriptions under which people act constitute the kind of act and the kind of person that commits the act. By illustration, a child pushes another child in the playground. If asked why he did that, he might answer "to show who's boss", "because I have ADHD", or "because I was provoked". Hacking is not concerned with which description best suits the act, but rather, how the descriptions under which people act depend on the descriptions available to them.

According to Hacking, selves are formed not only by humans' bio-physical constitution and the events we experience, but also by the descriptions we ascribe to the events that occur and the events we engage in. These descriptions are often causal descriptions: explanations of how we have come to be the persons that we are. A person does not come to be the person that she is simply because the events of her past caused her to be this person. Rather, the descriptions attributed to events in the past are a formative influence on her being. These explanations are replete with meaning and causal attribution. People are substantially (though not entirely) the people they understand themselves to be.

Acting under a description also has important implications for our interpretation of different societies and different eras. Hacking argues that descriptions change as the shared understandings of particular acts change. Hacking provides the following example. 17th-century courtiers tickled the genitalia of Louis XIII. Were they guilty of child abuse? The description of child abuse available in the 21st century did not exist in the 17th century. "In short, the charge of child abuse may be true of the past, but it was not true in the past. The description only becomes true with time. For Hacking, retroactive descriptions are, at the very least, controversial."

The past is indeterminate, not because acts simply may or may not have happened, but because the ascribed causes of those acts form an ever-shifting account depending on the ebb and flow of descriptions readily ascribed to those acts as the practices of society change.

== See also ==
- Rewriting the Soul, a book-length study by Hacking of dissociative identity disorder
