= Virtue jurisprudence =

Virtue ethics applied to jurisprudence

In the philosophy of law, virtue jurisprudence is the set of theories of law related to virtue ethics. By making the aretaic turn in legal theory, virtue jurisprudence focuses on the importance of character and human excellence or virtue to questions about the nature of law, the content of the law, and judging.

== The topics encompassed by virtue jurisprudence ==
Among the topics encompassed by virtue jurisprudence are:

1. Virtue ethics has implications for an account of the proper ends of legislation. If the aim of law is to make citizens virtuous (as opposed to maximizing utility or realizing a set of moral rights), what are the implications for the content of the laws?
2. Virtue ethics has implications for legal ethics. Current approaches to legal ethics emphasize deontological moral theory, i.e. duties to clients and respect for client autonomy, and these deontological approaches are reflected in the various codes of professional conduct that have been devised for lawyers, judges, and legislators.
3. Accounts of the virtue of justice (in particular, Aristotle and Aquinas's theories of natural justice) have implications for debates between natural lawyers and legal positivists over the nature of law.
4. A virtue-centered theory of judging, which describes the particular excellences required by judges.

== Aretaic theories of judging ==
=== The judicial virtues ===
The most developed aspect of virtue jurisprudence is its distinctive theory of judging. A virtue-centered theory of judging offers an account of the characteristics or excellences that make for a good judge. These include: judicial temperance, judicial courage, judicial temperament, judicial intelligence, judicial wisdom, and justice. Although every theory of judging can incorporate some account of judicial virtue, a virtue-centered theory of judging makes the distinctive claim that the judicial virtues are central, i.e. that they have basic explanatory and normative significance.

=== Criticisms of a virtue-centered theory of judging ===
Many of the criticisms of virtue jurisprudence are parallel to those offered in the context of debates over virtue ethics. Some of these include:

- The charge that virtue jurisprudence does not provide sufficient guidance for making legal decisions. Advocates of virtue-centered theories of judging urge, "Do as a virtuous judge would do!" This formula provides little instruction to an ordinary decision maker, and it may encourage unedifying debates about the character--or lack thereof--of judges with whom one disagrees. Such virtue-centered standards may be too abstract to provide clear guidance, and may invite inappropriate personal attacks on judges' characters.
- The argument that virtue jurisprudence requires inordinate trust in the capacities of judges. In a democratic society, the rightness or wrongness of legal decisions should be decided by criteria that are public and accessible to all citizens. Judges who make decisions based on their own individual view of what an (ideally?) virtuous judge would do, may violate this publicity requirement by relying on a personal ideal of judging, rather than on established legal norms.
- The claim that in modern liberal societies there is significant disagreement about what virtues a good or exemplary judge must possess. Some putative judicial virtues (e.g., impartiality, wisdom, open-mindedness, integrity, fairness, industriousness, and good temper) are relatively uncontroversial, while others (such as judicial restraint or sympathy for the underprivileged) are more contentious.

Other common criticisms of virtue jurisprudence include:

- The claim that rules play a more important role in law than they do in ethics. In law, for example, respect for the rule of law may require judges to decide cases primarily by invoking legal rules and other well-established legal norms. In ethics, there may be more scope for individualized judgment and discretion, as well as a greater focus on issues of personal character and flourishing.
- The argument that virtue jurisprudence, in virtue of its commitment to human flourishing as the proper aim of the law, can easily lead to illiberal values and misguided attempts to legislate morality.

== Virtue as the proper end of law ==
Aristotle argued that the promotion of virtue was the proper end of law. Aquinas argued that true laws (which are rational) can teach virtue by being internalized by those who already possess sufficient virtue to grasp the purpose of the law. Even those who have not yet achieved this level of virtue can be coerced into obedience to the law, and this may enable them to become more virtuous.

A contemporary restatement of this view is found in the writings of Robert George. In his book, Making Men Moral, George argues for the promotion of virtue as the end of law and against the contrary views that the purpose of law is either the protection of rights or the general happiness.

== Law and virtue outside the Western tradition ==
The phrase "virtue jurisprudence" is usually applied in the context of contemporary Western philosophical thinking about law. There are, however, important ideas about the relationship between law and virtue in other intellectual traditions. One example is provided by Confucian ideas about virtue. In the Analects, Confucius argues that a society in which people are virtuous would have no need of judges, rules, or jurisprudence because people would be able to resolve social conflicts by themselves. Thus, it is argued that the idea of virtue is opposed to the idea of law.

It can be argued that even virtuous citizens might disagree about the application of the law, especially where their own interests or ideological commitments are at stake. However, this argument is rather foreign to both traditional and modern Chinese political thought. Chinese political theory tends to assume that the truly virtuous are selfless to the point of martyrdom and would not consider their own personal interests and that the virtuous are able to transcend ideology. At the same time, traditional Chinese political thought regards those with absolute virtue to be historically extremely rare, and that most people, including the Emperor and his officials, are prone to both corruption and error. Consequently, there is a belief that law and indeed government is an unfortunate necessity in dealing with an imperfect world and with imperfect people.

The view that the inculcation of virtue is the proper end of legislation contrasts markedly with traditional Chinese thinking on the subject, which argues that laws exist because men are lacking in virtue. Confucianism places very little faith on the ability of law or external pressure to make men moral but rather believes that virtue must come from introspection and education. Throughout Chinese political and intellectual history, the Confucian view on law was frequently contrasted in discourse and practice with Chinese Legalist philosophy.

== See also ==
- Adjudication
- Aristotle
- Constitutionalism
- Legal ethics
- Rule according to higher law
- Judicial activism
- Jurisprudence
- Natural law
- Philosophy of law
- Thomas Aquinas
- Virtue ethics
- Virtue
