= The Schizophrenia of Modern Ethical Theories =

1976 philosophy paper by Michael Stocker

"The Schizophrenia of Modern Ethical Theories" is a 1976 paper in ethics by Michael Stocker published in The Journal of Philosophy.

== Overview ==
The central claim of the paper is that some modern ethical theories fail to account for motive in their theories, producing a sort of schizophrenia because the agent is unable to use his reason or motives as a basis for his actions. According to Stocker, motive is important to ethics and should be considered as well, rather than only "duty, rightness and obligation" which he believes are the main focuses of current theories. Stocker believes that this focus is not compatible with the motives required for goods such as love and friendship.

Stocker uses the example of a friend visiting you in the hospital. It is nice at first, however he reveals that he chose to spend time with you not out of concern for you in particular, but because he felt it was his moral duty. In this case, we feel that there is something missing in this action—we would much prefer to be visited by someone who cares about us directly, not just his duty.

== See also ==
- Deontological ethics
- Immanuel Kant
- "Modern Moral Philosophy"
- Virtue ethics
