= Michael Stocker =

American philosopher

- Born: Michael Adam Gerber Stocker; 1939
- Died: 2024 (aged 84–85)

Education
- Education: Columbia College (B.A.), Harvard University (Ph.D.)
- Thesis: Supererogation (1965)
- Doctoral advisor: Roderick Firth, John Rawls

Philosophical work
- Era: Contemporary philosophy
- Region: Western philosophy
- Institutions: Syracuse University
- Main interests: Moral psychology, moral philosophy, ethical theory
- Notable ideas: Dirty hands, schizophrenia of modern ethical theories, plural and conflicting values

Michael Adam Gerber Stocker (1939–2024) was a 20th-century American political philosopher. He held the Irwin & Marjorie Guttag Professorship of Ethics and Political Philosophy at Syracuse University. Stocker is known for his works on ethics; he authored the seminal paper "The Schizophrenia of Modern Ethical Theories".

== Education ==
He earned his B.A. from Columbia College, where he was a student of Sidney Morgenbesser, and Ph.D. (1966) from Harvard University, where he wrote his dissertation on supererogation under the direction of John Rawls.

== Works ==
Books

- Plural and Conflicting Values, Oxford: Oxford University Press 1990, reprinted 1992
- Valuing Emotions (with Elizabeth Hegeman), New York: Cambridge University Press, 1996

Select articles, book chapters (co-)authored

- "Act and Agent Evaluations." The Review of Metaphysics, Volume 27, Issue 1, September 1973, pp. 42-61.
- "The Schizophrenia of Modern Ethical Theories." The Journal of Philosophy, Vol. 73, No. 14, August 1976, pp. 453-466
- "Desiring the bad: An essay in moral psychology." The Journal of Philosophy, Vol. 76, Issue 12, December 1979, pp. 747-765
- "Values and Purposes: The Limits of Teleology and the Ends of Friendship." The Journal of Philosophy, Vol. 78, No. 12, December 1981, pp. 747-765
- "Responsibility Especially for Beliefs." Mind, Vol. XCI, Issue 363, July 1982, pp. 398–417.
- "Dirty Hands and Conflicts of Values and of Desires in Aristotle's Ethics." Pacific Philosophical Quarterly, Vol. 67, 1986, pp. 36–61.
