= Oikeiôsis =

Concept in Stoic philosophy

In Stoic ethics, oikeiôsis (Ancient Greek: οἰκείωσις, Latin: conciliatio) is a technical term variously translated as "appropriation," "orientation," "familiarization," "affinity," "affiliation," and "endearment." Oikeiôsis signifies the perception of something as one's own, as belonging to oneself. The theory of oikeiôsis can be traced back to the work of the first Stoic philosopher, Zeno of Citium.

The Stoic philosopher Hierocles saw it as the basis for all animal impulses as well as human ethical action. According to Porphyry, "those who followed Zeno stated that oikeiôsis is the beginning of justice".

== Etymology ==
Oikeiôsis is rooted in the word oikos (οἶκος). Oikos is the word for household, house, or family, and can be seen in modern English words like economics and ecology (Greek oiko- to Classical Latin oeco- to Medieval Latin eco-). Similarly, the term Oikeiotes denotes the sense of belonging, the opposite of alienation. The term invokes the sense of being "at home", of belonging to and by extension becoming "familiarized" with something.

== Hierocles' theory ==
In his Elements of Ethics (Ἠθικὴ στοιχείωσις), the philosopher Hierocles began his account of oikeiôsis by looking at the beginning of the life of animals. In the initial stage of perception, an animal is only aware of their bodies and sensations as "belonging to itself", this awareness is the proton oikeion, the "first thing that is one's own and familiar". This self-awareness is continuous as well as dependent on the perception of external objects. This is why, according to Hierocles, children are afraid of the dark, because their weak sense of self fears death in the absence of external entities. Hierocles argued that the impulse of self-preservation arises out of oikeiôsis: "an animal, when it has received the first perception of itself, immediately becomes its own and familiar to itself and to its constitution". In perceiving itself and becoming familiar to itself, an animal finds value in itself and its own well-being.

Hierocles divided the many forms of Oikeiôsis as internal and external. Internal forms of oikeiôsis included appropriation of the self as well as of one's constitution, external forms included familiarization with other people and an orientation towards external goods. Oikeiôsis is the basis for Hierocles' theory of "appropriate acts" (καθήκοντα) because it is in "accordance with nature" since animals use appropriation to project themselves externally and thus care for others (such as their offspring). Stoics see these acts as a duty because, according to Cicero, "all duties derive from principles of nature". In Hierocles' other ethical work, On Appropriate acts (of which only fragments survive), he outlined a theory of duty based on concentric circles. Beginning with the self and then our immediate family, Hierocles outlined how humans can extend their oikeiôsis towards other human beings in widening circles, such as our ethnos and eventually the entire human race. The distance from the center acts as a standard by which we may measure the strength of our ties and therefore our duties towards other people. Hierocles argued that there was an ethical need for a "contraction of circles", to reduce the distance between the circles as much as possible and therefore increase our familiarization with all of mankind (while still retaining the strongest affinity within our immediate circle).
