= G. E. M. Anscombe =

British analytic philosopher (1919–2001)

G. E. M. Anscombe FBA
- Born: Gertrude Elizabeth Margaret Anscombe; 18 March 1919; Limerick, Ireland
- Died: 5 January 2001 (aged 81); Cambridge, England
- Other name: Elizabeth Anscombe
- Spouse: Peter Geach (m. 1941)
- Children: 7

Education
- Education: St Hugh's College, Oxford (BA); Newnham College, Cambridge

Philosophical work
- Era: 20th-century philosophy
- Region: Western philosophy
- School: Analytic philosophy; Analytical Thomism
- Institutions: University of Oxford
- Doctoral students: Roger Scruton
- Notable students: Philippa Foot; Anthony Kenny; Jenny Teichman
- Main interests: Ethics; logic; philosophy of action; philosophy of language; philosophy of mind
- Notable works: Intention (1957); "Modern Moral Philosophy" (1958)
- Notable ideas: Acting under a description; Brute facts; Coining "consequentialism"; Direction of fit; Modern revival of virtue ethics

Gertrude Elizabeth Margaret Anscombe (/ˈænskəm/; 18 March 1919 – 5 January 2001), usually cited as G. E. M. Anscombe or Elizabeth Anscombe, was a British analytic philosopher. She wrote on the philosophy of mind, philosophy of action, philosophical logic, philosophy of language, and ethics. She was a prominent figure of analytical Thomism, a fellow of Somerville College, Oxford, and a professor of philosophy at the University of Cambridge.

Anscombe was a student of Ludwig Wittgenstein and became an authority on his work and edited and translated many books drawn from his writings, above all his Philosophical Investigations. Anscombe's 1958 article "Modern Moral Philosophy" introduced the term consequentialism into the language of analytic philosophy, and had a seminal influence on contemporary virtue ethics. Her monograph Intention (1957) was described by Donald Davidson as "the most important treatment of action since Aristotle". It is "widely considered a foundational text in contemporary philosophy of action" and has also had influence in the philosophy of practical reason."

== Life ==
Anscombe was born to Captain Allen Wells Anscombe and Gertrude Elizabeth (née Thomas) on 18 March 1919 in Limerick, Ireland, where her father had been stationed with the Royal Welch Fusiliers during the Irish War of Independence. Both her mother and father were involved with education. Her mother was a headmistress and her father headed the science and engineering side at Dulwich College.

Anscombe attended Sydenham High School and then, in 1937, went on to read literae humaniores ("Greats") at St Hugh's College, Oxford, where her tutor was the archaeologist Dorothea Gray. She was awarded a second class in her honour moderations in 1939 and (albeit it with reservations on the part of her Ancient History examiners) a first in her degree finals in 1941.

While still at Sydenham High School, Anscombe converted to Catholicism. During her first year at St Hugh's, she was received into the Church, and was a practising Catholic thereafter.

In 1941 she married Peter Geach. Like her, Geach was a Catholic convert who became a student of Ludwig Wittgenstein and a distinguished academic philosopher. Together they had three sons and four daughters.

After graduating from Oxford, Anscombe was awarded a research fellowship for postgraduate study at Newnham College, Cambridge, from 1942 to 1945. Her purpose was to attend Wittgenstein's lectures. Her interest in Wittgenstein's philosophy arose from reading the Tractatus Logico-Philosophicus as an undergraduate. She claimed to have conceived the idea of studying with Wittgenstein as soon as she opened the book in Blackwell's and read section 5.53, "Identity of object I express by identity of sign, and not by using a sign for identity. Difference of objects I express by difference of signs." She became an enthusiastic student, feeling that Wittgenstein's therapeutic method helped to free her from philosophical difficulties in ways that her training in traditional systematic philosophy could not. As she wrote:

For years, I would spend time, in cafés, for example, staring at objects saying to myself: 'I see a packet. But what do I really see? How can I say that I see here anything more than a yellow expanse?' ... I always hated phenomenalism and felt trapped by it. I couldn't see my way out of it but I didn't believe it. It was no good pointing to difficulties about it, things which Russell found wrong with it, for example. The strength, the central nerve of it remained alive and raged achingly. It was only in Wittgenstein's classes in 1944 that I saw the nerve being extracted, the central thought "I have got this, and I define 'yellow' (say) as this" being effectively attacked.

— Metaphysics and the Philosophy of Mind: The Collected Philosophical Papers of G. E. M. Anscombe, Volume 2 (1981) pp. vii–x.

After her fellowship at Cambridge ended, she was awarded a research fellowship at Somerville College, Oxford, but during the academic year of 1946/47, she continued to travel to Cambridge once a week to attend tutorials with Wittgenstein that were devoted mainly to the philosophy of religion. She became one of Wittgenstein's favourite students and one of his closest friends. Wittgenstein affectionately addressed her by the pet name "old man" – she being (according to Ray Monk) "an exception to his general dislike of academic women". His confidence in Anscombe's understanding of his perspective is shown by his choice of her as the translator of his Philosophical Investigations (for which purpose he arranged for her to spend some time in Vienna to improve her German).

Anscombe visited Wittgenstein many times after he left Cambridge in 1947, and Wittgenstein stayed at her house in Oxford for a period in 1950. She travelled to Cambridge in April 1951 to visit him on his deathbed. Wittgenstein named her, along with Rush Rhees and Georg Henrik von Wright, as his literary executor. After his death in 1951 she was responsible for editing, translating, and publishing many of Wittgenstein's manuscripts and notebooks.

Anscombe did not avoid controversy. As an undergraduate in 1939 she had publicly criticised Britain's entry into the Second World War. And, in 1956, while a research fellow, she unsuccessfully protested against Oxford granting an honorary degree to Harry S. Truman, whom she denounced as a mass murderer for his use of atomic bombs against Hiroshima and Nagasaki. She would further publicise her position in a (sometimes erroneously dated) pamphlet privately printed soon after Truman's nomination for the degree was approved. In the same she said she "should fear to go" to the Encaenia (the degree conferral ceremony) "in case God's patience suddenly ends." She would also court controversy with some of her colleagues by defending the Catholic Church's opposition to contraception. Later in life, she would be arrested protesting outside an abortion clinic, after abortion had been legalised in Great Britain.

Having remained at Somerville College since 1946, Anscombe was elected Professor of Philosophy at the University of Cambridge in 1970, where she served until her retirement in 1986. She was elected a fellow of the British Academy in 1967, and a Foreign Honorary Member of the American Academy of Arts and Sciences in 1979.

In her later years, Anscombe suffered from heart disease, and was nearly killed in a car crash in 1996. She never fully recovered and she spent her last years in the care of her family in Cambridge. On 5 January 2001, she died from kidney failure at Addenbrooke's Hospital at the age of 81, with her husband and four of their seven children at her bedside, just after praying the Sorrowful Mysteries of the rosary. Anscombe's "last intentional act was kissing Peter Geach", her husband of sixty years.

Anscombe was buried adjacent to Wittgenstein in the St Giles' graveyard, Huntingdon Road, (now the Ascension Parish burial ground). Her husband joined her there in 2013.

=== Debate with C. S. Lewis ===
As a young philosophy don, Anscombe acquired a reputation as a formidable debater. In 1948, she presented a paper at a meeting of Oxford's Socratic Club in which she disputed C. S. Lewis's argument that naturalism was self-refuting (found in the third chapter of the original publication of his book Miracles). Some associates of Lewis, primarily George Sayer and Derek Brewer, have remarked that Lewis lost the subsequent debate on her paper and that this loss was so humiliating that he abandoned theological argument and turned entirely to devotional writing and children's literature. This is a claim disputed by Walter Hooper and Anscombe's impression of the effect upon Lewis differed:

The fact that Lewis rewrote that chapter, and rewrote it so that it now has those qualities [to address Anscombe's objections], shows his honesty and seriousness. The meeting of the Socratic Club at which I read my paper has been described by several of his friends as a horrible and shocking experience which upset him very much. Neither Dr Havard (who had Lewis and me to dinner a few weeks later) nor Professor Jack Bennet remembered any such feelings on Lewis' part ... My own recollection is that it was an occasion of sober discussion of certain quite definite criticisms, which Lewis' rethinking and rewriting showed he thought was accurate. I am inclined to construe the odd accounts of the matter by some of his friends – who seem not to have been interested in the actual arguments or the subject matter – as an interesting example of the phenomenon called "projection".

— Metaphysics and the Philosophy of Mind: The Collected Philosophical Papers of G. E. M. Anscombe, Volume 2 (1981) p. x.

As a result of the debate, Lewis substantially rewrote chapter 3 of Miracles for the 1960 paperback edition.

== Work ==
=== On Wittgenstein ===
Some of Anscombe's most frequently cited works are translations, editions, and expositions of the work of her teacher Ludwig Wittgenstein, including an influential exegesis of Wittgenstein's 1921 book, the Tractatus Logico-Philosophicus. This brought to the fore the importance of Gottlob Frege for Wittgenstein's thought and, partly on that basis, attacked "positivist" interpretations of the work. She co-edited his posthumous second book, Philosophische Untersuchungen/Philosophical Investigations (1953) with Rush Rhees. Her English translation of the book appeared simultaneously and remains standard. She went on to edit or co-edit several volumes of selections from his notebooks, (co-)translating many important works like Remarks on the Foundations of Mathematics (1956) and Wittgenstein's "sustained treatment" of G. E. Moore's epistemology, On Certainty (1969). She edited and translated Remarks on the Philosophy of Psychology Vol 1. (1980).

In 1978, Anscombe was awarded the Austrian Cross of Honour for Science and Art, 1st class for her work on Wittgenstein.

=== Intention ===
Her most important work is the monograph Intention (1957). Three volumes of collected papers were published in 1981: From Parmenides to Wittgenstein; Metaphysics and the Philosophy of Mind; and Ethics, Religion and Politics. Another collection, Human Life, Action and Ethics appeared posthumously in 2005.

The aim of Intention (1957) was to make plain the character of human action and will. Anscombe approaches the matter through the concept of intention, which, as she notes, has three modes of appearance in the English language:

| She is X'ing intentionally | intentional action |
| She is X'ing with the intention of doing Y or ... She is X'ing to Y | intention with which or further intention in acting |
| She intends to Y or ... She has expressed the intention to do Y | expression of intention for the future; (what Davidson later called a pure intending) |

She suggests that a true account must somehow connect these three uses of the concept, though later students of intention have sometimes denied this, and disputed some of the things she presupposes under the first and third headings. It is clear though that it is the second that is crucial to her main purpose, which is to comprehend the way in which human thought and understanding and conceptualisation relate to the "events in a man's history", or the goings on to which he is subject.

Rather than attempt to define intentions in abstraction from actions, thus taking the third heading first, Anscombe begins with the concept of an intentional action. This soon connected with the second heading. She says that what is up with a human being is an intentional action if the question "Why", taken in a certain sense (and evidently conceived as addressed to him), has application. An agent can answer the "why" question by giving a reason or purpose for her action. "To do Y" or "because I want to do Y" would be typical answers to this sort of "why?"; though they are not the only ones, they are crucial to the constitution of the phenomenon as a typical phenomenon of human life. The agent's answer helps supply the descriptions under which the action is intentional. Anscombe was the first to clearly spell out that actions are intentional under some descriptions and not others. In her famous example, a man's action (which we might observe as consisting of moving an arm up and down while holding a handle) may be intentional under the description "pumping water" but not under other descriptions such as "contracting these muscles", "tapping out this rhythm", and so on. This approach to action influenced Donald Davidson's theory, despite the fact that Davidson went on to argue for a causal theory of action that Anscombe never accepted.

Intention (1957) is also the classic source for the idea that there is a difference in "direction of fit" between cognitive states like beliefs and conative states like desire. (This theme was later taken up and discussed by John Searle.) Cognitive states describe the world and are causally derived from the facts or objects they depict. Conative states do not describe the world, but aim to bring something about in the world. Anscombe used the example of a shopping list to illustrate the difference. The list can be a straightforward observational report of what is actually bought (thereby acting like a cognitive state), or it can function as a conative state such as a command or desire, dictating what the agent should buy. If the agent fails to buy what is listed, we do not say that the list is untrue or incorrect; we say that the mistake is in the action, not the desire. According to Anscombe, this difference in direction of fit is a major difference between speculative knowledge (theoretical, empirical knowledge) and practical knowledge (knowledge of actions and morals). Whereas "speculative knowledge" is "derived from the objects known", practical knowledge is – in a phrase Anscombe lifts from Aquinas – "the cause of what it understands".

=== Ethics ===
Anscombe made great contributions to ethics as well as metaphysics. Her 1958 essay "Modern Moral Philosophy" is credited with having coined the term "consequentialism", as well as with reviving interest in and study of virtue ethics in Western academic philosophy.

The Anscombe Bioethics Centre in Oxford is named after her, and conducts bioethical research in the Catholic tradition.

=== Brute and institutional facts ===
Anscombe also introduced the idea of a set of facts being 'brute relative to' some fact. When a set of facts xyz stands in this relation to a fact A, they are a subset out of a range some subset among which holds if A holds. Thus if A is the fact that I have paid for something, the brute facts might be that I have handed him a cheque for a sum which he has named as the price for the goods, saying that this is the payment, or that I gave him some cash at the time that he gave me the goods. There tends, according to Anscombe, to be an institutional context which gives its point to the description 'A', but of which 'A' is not itself a description: that I have given someone a shilling is not a description of the institution of money or of the currency of the country. According to her, no brute facts xyz can generally be said to entail the fact A relative to which they are 'brute' except with the proviso "under normal circumstances", for "one cannot mention all the things that were not the case, which would have made a difference if they had been." A set of facts xyz ... may be brute relative to a fact A which itself is one of a set of facts ABC ... which is brute relative to some further fact W. Thus Anscombe's account is not of a distinct class of facts, to be distinguished from another class, 'institutional facts': the essential relation is that of a set of facts being 'brute relative to' some fact. Following Anscombe, John Searle derived another conception of 'brute facts' as non-mental facts to play the foundational role and generate similar hierarchies in his philosophical account of speech acts and institutional reality.

=== First person ===
Her paper "The First Person" buttressed remarks by Wittgenstein (in his Lectures on "Private Experience") arguing for the now-notorious conclusion that the first-person pronoun, "I", does not refer to anything (not, e.g., to the speaker) because of its immunity from reference failure. Having shown by counter-example that 'I' does not refer to the body, Anscombe objected to the implied Cartesianism of its referring at all. Few people accept the conclusion – though the position was later adopted in a more radical form by David Lewis – but the paper was an important contribution to work on indexicals and self-consciousness that has been carried on by philosophers as varied as John Perry, Peter Strawson, David Kaplan, Gareth Evans, John McDowell, and Sebastian Rödl.

=== Causality ===
In her article, "Causality and Determination", Anscombe defends two main ideas: that causal relations are perceivable, and that causation does not require a necessary connection and a universal generalization linking cause and effect. Regarding her idea that causal relations are perceivable, she believes that we perceive the causal relations between objects and events.

In defending her idea that causal relations are perceivable, Anscombe poses a question "How did we come by our primary knowledge of causality?". She proposes two answers to this question:

1. By "learning to speak, we learned the linguistic representation and application of a host of causal concepts"
2. By observing that some action(s) caused a certain event

In proposing her first answer, that by "learning to speak, we learned the linguistic representation and application of a host of causal concepts", Anscombe thinks that by learning to speak we already have a linguistic representation of certain causal concepts and she gives an example of transitive verbs, such as scrape, push, carry, knock over.

Example: I knocked over a vase of flowers.

In proposing her second answer, that by observing some actions we can see causation, Anscombe thinks that we cannot ignore the fact that certain actions, which produced a certain event are possible to observe.

Example: a cat spilled milk.

The second idea that Anscombe defends in the article "Causality and Determination" is that causation requires neither a necessary connection nor a universal generalization linking cause and effect.

Anscombe states that it is assumed that causality is some kind of necessary connection.

== Views of her work ==
The philosopher Candace Vogler says that Anscombe's "strength" is that "'when she is writing for [a] Catholic audience, she presumes they share certain fundamental beliefs,' but she is equally willing to write for people who do not share her assumptions." In 2010, philosopher Roger Scruton wrote that Anscombe was "perhaps the last great philosopher writing in English". Mary Warnock described her as "the undoubted giant among women philosophers" while John Haldane said she "certainly has a good claim to be the greatest woman philosopher of whom we know".

== Bibliography ==
=== Books ===
- Intention. Oxford: Blackwell. 1957.
- An Introduction to Wittgenstein's Tractatus. 1959.
- Three Philosophers. With P. T. Geach. 1961.
- Causality and Determination: an inaugural lecture. CUP Archive. 1971. ISBN 978-0-521-08304-1. reprinted in Metaphysics and the Philosophy of Mind.
- Times, Beginnings and Causes (PDF). Oxford University Press [for the British Academy]. 1975. ISBN 978-0-19-725712-8.
- From Parmenides to Wittgenstein. The Collected Philosophical Papers of G. E. M. Anscombe. Vol. 1. 1981. ISBN 978-0-631-12922-6.
- Metaphysics and the Philosophy of Mind. The Collected Philosophical Papers of G. E. M. Anscombe. Vol. 2. Oxford: Blackwell. 1981. ISBN 978-0-631-12932-5.
- Ethics, Religion and Politics. The Collected Philosophical Papers of G. E. M. Anscombe. Vol. 3. 1981. ISBN 978-0-631-12942-4.
- Human Life, Action and Ethics. Edited by Mary Geach; Luke Gormally. St. Andrews Studies in Philosophy and Public Affairs. 4. Exeter, England: Imprint Academic. 2005. ISBN 978-1-84540-013-2
- La filosofia analitica y la espiritualidad del hombre (in Spanish). Edited by J. M. Torralba; J. Nubiola. Pamplona, Spain: Ediciones de la Universidad de Navarra S.A. 2005. ISBN 978-84-313-2245-8.
- Faith in a Hard Ground: Essays on Religion, Philosophy and Ethics. Edited by Mary Geach; Luke Gormally. St. Andrews Studies in Philosophy and Public Affairs. 11. Exeter, England: Imprint Academic. 2008. ISBN 978-1-84540-121-4
- From Plato to Wittgenstein. Edited by Mary Geach; Luke Gormally. St. Andrews Studies in Philosophy and Public Affairs. 18. Exeter, England: Imprint Academic. 2011. ISBN 978-1-84540-232-7

=== Select papers and book chapters ===
- Anscombe, G. E. M. (1957). "XIV.—Intention". Proceedings of the Aristotelian Society. 57: 321–332. doi:10.1093/aristotelian/57.1.321.
- "On Brute Facts" (PDF). Analysis. 18 (3). Oxford: Oxford University Press: 69–72. 1958. doi:10.2307/3326788. ISSN 0003-2638. JSTOR 3326788.
- Austin, J. L.; Anscombe, G. E. M. (1958). "Pretending". Aristotelian Society Supplementary Volume. 32. Aristotelian Society: 261–294. doi:10.1093/aristoteliansupp/32.1.261.
- G. E. M. Anscombe; J. Körner (12 July 1964). "Substance". Aristotelian Society Supplementary Volume. 38 (1). Aristotelian Society: 69–90. doi:10.1093/aristoteliansupp/38.1.69. XIV.—
- "Times, Beginnings and Causes" Proceedings of the British Academy 60, 1974 (1975)
- Anscombe, G.E.M. "Memory, 'Experience' and Causation" in: Lewis, Hywel David (ed.) Contemporary British Philosophy Personal Statements Fourth Series (1976)
- Anscombe, G.E.M. "'Soft' determinism" in: Gilbert Ryle (ed.), Contemporary aspects of philosophy (1977)
- Lockwood, Michael; Anscombe, G. E. M. (1983). "Sins of Omission? The Non-Treatment of Controls in Clinical Trials". Aristotelian Society Supplementary Volume. 57. Aristotelian Society: 207–227. doi:10.1093/aristoteliansupp/57.1.207.

=== Festschriften ===
- Gormally, Luke, ed. (1994). Moral truth and Moral Tradition: Essays in Honour of Peter Geach and Elizabeth Anscombe. Dublin: Four Courts Press.

== See also ==
- Chastity clubs in the United States, many of which are named "Anscombe Society" in her honor
- No Morality, No Self, a 2018 philosophy book written by James Doyle about Anscombe
