= Alasdair MacIntyre =

Scottish-American philosopher (1929–2025)

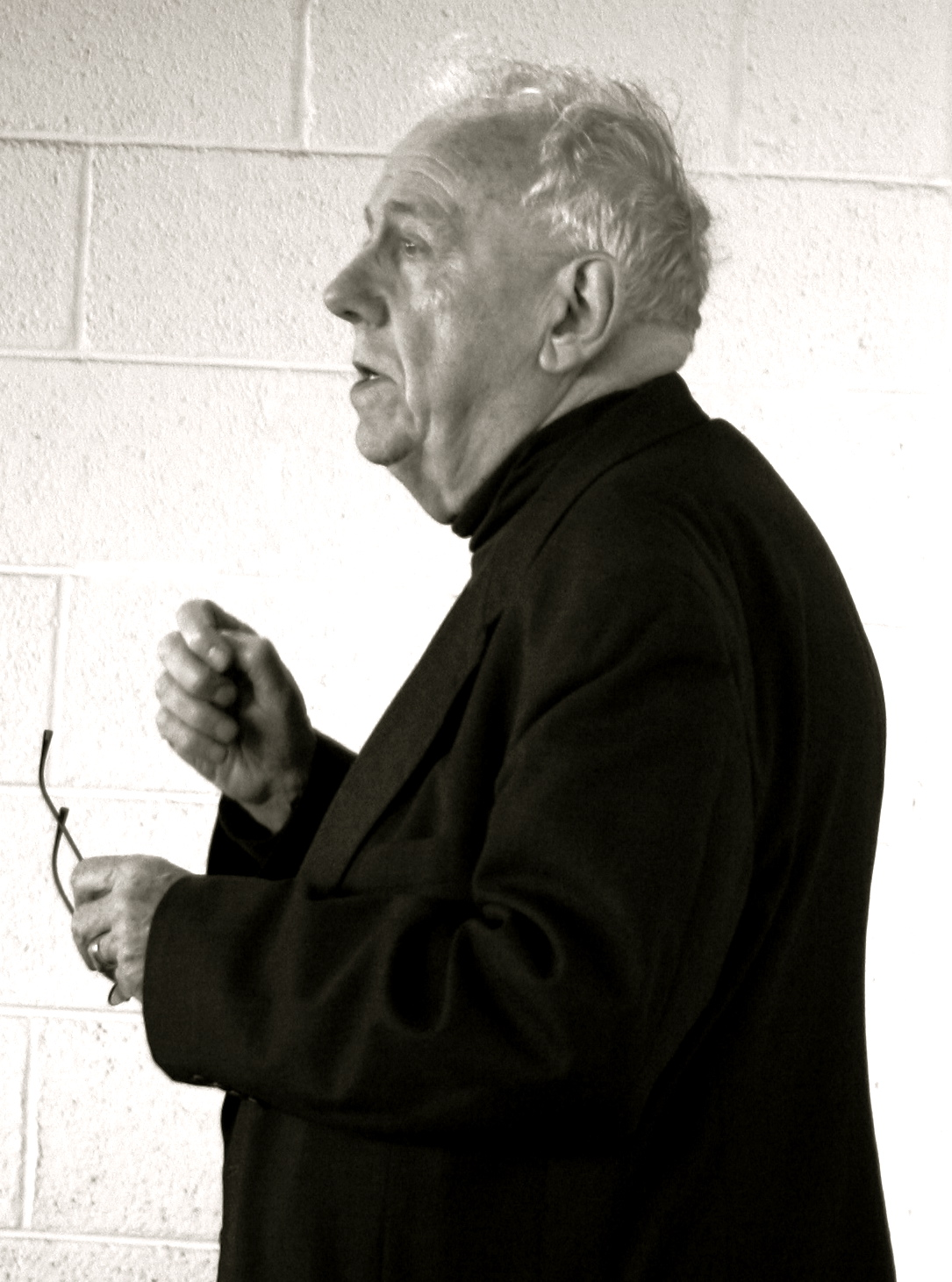
- Born: Alasdair Chalmers MacIntyre; 12 January 1929; Glasgow, Scotland
- Died: 21 May 2025 (aged 96); South Bend, Indiana, U.S.
- Spouses: Ann Peri (m. 1953; div. 1963) Susan Margery Willans (m. 1963; div. 1977) Lynn Sumida Joy (m. 1977; died 2025)
- Children: 4

Education
- Education: Queen Mary College, London; University of Manchester; University of Oxford
- Academic advisor: Dorothy Emmet

Philosophical work
- Era: Contemporary philosophy
- Region: Western philosophy
- School: Analytic philosophy; Aristotelianism; Communitarianism; Thomism; Virtue ethics
- Institutions: University of Oxford; University of Manchester; University of Leeds; University of Essex; Brandeis University; Boston University; Wellesley College; Vanderbilt University; University of Notre Dame; Duke University
- Doctoral students: Cheyney Ryan; May Sim
- Main interests: Ethics; Metaethics; History of ethics; Social philosophy; Political philosophy
- Notable works: After Virtue (1981); Whose Justice? Which Rationality? (1988)
- Notable ideas: Aretaic turn; Distinction between internal and external goods; Tradition-constituted reason; Predecessor culture

Alasdair Chalmers MacIntyre (Note: Pronounced /ˈælɪstər ˈmækɪntaɪər/ AL-ist-air MAK-in-tire.) (12 January 1929 – 21 May 2025) was a Scottish-American philosopher who contributed to moral and political philosophy as well as history of philosophy and theology. MacIntyre's After Virtue (1981) is one of the most important works of Anglophone moral and political philosophy in the 20th century. He was a senior research fellow at the Centre for Contemporary Aristotelian Studies in Ethics and Politics (CASEP) at London Metropolitan University, emeritus Professor of Philosophy at the University of Notre Dame, and permanent senior distinguished research fellow at the Notre Dame de Nicola Center for Ethics and Culture. During his lengthy academic career, he also taught at Brandeis University, Duke University, Vanderbilt University, and Boston University.

== Biography ==
=== Early life and education ===
Alasdair Chalmers MacIntyre was born on 12 January 1929 in Glasgow, to Eneas and Greta (Chalmers) MacIntyre. He was educated at Queen Mary College, London, and had a Master of Arts degree from the University of Manchester, where his philosophy teacher was Dorothy Emmet and his fellow student was Herbert McCabe and from the University of Oxford.

=== Professorship ===
He began his teaching career in 1951 at Manchester. He taught at the University of Leeds, the University of Essex and the University of Oxford in the United Kingdom, before moving to the US in around 1969. MacIntyre was something of an intellectual nomad, having taught at many universities in the US. He had held the following positions:

- Professor of History of Ideas, Brandeis University (1969 or 1970),
- Dean of the College of Arts and professor of philosophy, Boston University (1972),
- Henry Luce Professor, Wellesley College (1980),
- W. Alton Jones Professor, Vanderbilt University (1982),
- Professor of Philosophy, University of Notre Dame (1985),
- Professor of Philosophy, Vanderbilt University (1985),
- Visiting scholar, Whitney Humanities Center, Yale University (1988),
- McMahon-Hank Professor of Philosophy, Notre Dame (1989), and
- Arts & Sciences Professor of Philosophy, Duke University (1995–2000).

He had also been a visiting professor at Princeton University and was president of the American Philosophical Association. In 2010, he was awarded the Aquinas Medal by the American Catholic Philosophical Association. He was a member of the American Academy of Arts and Sciences (elected 1985), the British Academy (1994), the Royal Irish Academy (1999), and the American Philosophical Society (2005).

From 2000, he was the Rev. John A. O'Brien Senior Research Professor in the Department of Philosophy (emeritus since 2010) at the University of Notre Dame, Indiana, US. He was also professor emerit and emeritus at Duke University. In July 2010, he became senior research fellow at London Metropolitan University's Centre for Contemporary Aristotelian Studies in Ethics and Politics. After his retirement from active teaching in 2010, MacIntyre remained the senior distinguished research fellow of the Notre Dame de Nicola Center for Ethics and Culture, where he retained an office. He continued to make public presentations, including an annual keynote as part of the de Nicola Center for Ethics and Culture's Fall Conference.

=== Death ===
MacIntyre died on 21 May 2025 at a care facility in South Bend, Indiana, at the age of 96.

== Philosophy ==
MacIntyre's approach to moral philosophy interweaves a number of complex strands. Although he largely aims to revive an Aristotelian moral philosophy based on the virtues, he claims a "peculiarly modern understanding" of this task.

This "peculiarly modern understanding" largely concerns MacIntyre's approach to moral disputes. Unlike some analytic philosophers who try to generate moral consensus on the basis of rationality, MacIntyre uses the historical development of ethics to circumvent the modern problem of "incommensurable" moral notions, whose merits cannot be compared in any common framework. Following Hegel and Collingwood, he offers a "philosophical history" (as opposed to analytical and phenomenological approaches) in which he concedes from the beginning that "there are no neutral standards available by appeal to which any rational agent whatsoever could determine" the conclusions of moral philosophy.

In his most famous work, After Virtue, he deprecates the attempt of Enlightenment thinkers to deduce a universal rational morality independent of teleology, whose failure led to the rejection of moral rationality altogether by successors such as Friedrich Nietzsche, Jean-Paul Sartre, and Charles Stevenson. He emphasizes how this overestimation of reason led to Nietzsche's utter repudiation of the possibility of moral rationality.

By contrast, MacIntyre attempts to reclaim more modest forms of moral rationality and argumentation which claim neither finality nor logical certainty, but which can hold up against relativistic or emotivist denials of any moral rationality whatsoever (which MacIntyre regards as the mistake of Nietzsche, Sartre, and Stevenson). He revives the tradition of Aristotelian ethics with its teleological account of the good and of moral actions, as fulfilled in the medieval writings of Thomas Aquinas. MacIntyre himself recalls some factors that led him to this Thomistic shift. American theologian Stanley Hauerwas is even more certain of this philosophical debt. He wrote, "the change in McIntyre's views of Aquinas' significance from After Virtue to Whose Justice? Which Rationality? no doubt is due to many factors, but surely Alasdair's regard for Herbert's reading of Aquinas had some effect". This Aristotelian-Thomistic tradition, he proposes, presents "the best theory so far," both of how things are and how we ought to act.

More generally, according to MacIntyre, moral disputes always take place within and between rival traditions of thought relying on an inherited store of ideas, presuppositions, types of arguments and shared understandings and approaches. Even though there is no definitive way for one tradition in moral philosophy to logically refute another, nevertheless opposing views can dispute each other's internal coherence, resolution of imaginative dilemmas and epistemic crises, and achievement of fruitful results.

=== After Virtue (1981) ===
Probably his most widely read work, After Virtue was written when MacIntyre was already in his fifties. Up to then, MacIntyre had been a relatively influential analytic philosopher of a Marxist bent whose moral inquiries had been conducted in a "piecemeal way, focusing first on this problem and then on that, in a mode characteristic of much analytic philosophy." However, after reading the works of Thomas Kuhn and Imre Lakatos on philosophy of science and epistemology, MacIntyre was inspired to change the entire direction of his thought, tearing up the manuscript he had been working on and deciding to view the problems of modern moral and political philosophy "not from the standpoint of liberal modernity, but instead from the standpoint of ... Aristotelian moral and political practice."

In general terms, the task of After Virtue is to account both for the dysfunction of modern moral discourse in modern society and to rehabilitate the alternative that is teleological rationality in Aristotelian virtue ethics. MacIntyre's philippic articulates a politics of self-defence for local communities who aspire to protect their traditional way of life from corrosive modern influences.

=== Whose Justice? Which Rationality? (1988) ===
MacIntyre's second major work of his mature period takes up the problem of giving an account of philosophical rationality within the context of his notion of "traditions," which had still remained under-theorized in After Virtue. Specifically, MacIntyre argues that rival and largely incompatible conceptions of justice are the outcome of rival and largely incompatible forms of practical rationality. These competing forms of practical rationality and their attendant ideas of justice are in turn the result of "socially embodied traditions of rational inquiry." Although MacIntyre's treatment of traditions is quite complex he does give a relatively concise definition: "A tradition is an argument extended through time in which certain fundamental agreements are defined and redefined" in terms of both internal and external debates.

Much of Whose Justice? Which Rationality? is therefore engaged in the task of not only giving the reader examples of what MacIntyre considers actual rival traditions and the different ways they can split apart, integrate, or defeat one another (e.g. Aristotelian, Augustinianism, Thomist, Humean) but also with substantiating how practical rationality and a conception of justice help constitute those traditions. Specifically, according to him, the differing accounts of justice that are presented by Aristotle and Hume are due to the underlying differences in their conceptual schemes. MacIntyre argues that despite their incommensurability there are various ways in which alien traditions might engage one another rationally – most especially via a form of immanent critique which makes use of empathetic imagination to then put the rival tradition into "epistemic crisis" but also by being able to solve shared or analogous problems and dilemmas from within one's own tradition which remain insoluble from the rival approach.

MacIntyre's account also defends three further theses: first, that all rational human inquiry is conducted whether knowingly or not from within a tradition; second, that the incommensurable conceptual schemes of rival traditions do not entail either relativism or perspectivism; third, that although the arguments of the book are themselves attempts at universally valid insights they are nevertheless given from within a particular tradition (that of Thomist Aristotelianism) and that this need not imply any philosophical inconsistency.

=== Three Rival Versions of Moral Inquiry (1990) ===
Three Rival Versions of Moral Inquiry was first presented by MacIntyre as part of the Gifford lecture series at the University of Edinburgh in 1988 and is considered by many the third part in a trilogy of philosophical argumentation that commenced with After Virtue. As its title implies, MacIntyre's aim in this book is to examine three major rival traditions of moral inquiry on the intellectual scene today (encyclopaedic, genealogical and traditional) which each in turn was given defence from a canonical piece published in the late nineteenth century (the Ninth Edition of the Encyclopædia Britannica, Friedrich Nietzsche's Genealogy of Morals and Pope Leo XIII's Aeterni Patris, respectively).

MacIntyre's book ultimately conducts a complex series of both interior and exterior critiques of the encyclopaedic and genealogical positions in an attempt to vindicate philosophical Thomism as the most persuasive form of moral inquiry currently on offer. His critique in chapter IX of Nietzsche's and Michel Foucault's genealogical mode as implicitly committed to an emancipatory and continuous notion of self which they cannot account for on their own terms has been of particular influence.

The tradition-bound account of rational inquiry MacIntyre articulates and deploys throughout these lectures suggests reforms, which he explores in chapter X, both for the lecture as a genre and for the university as an institution, outlining the concept of a "postliberal university of constrained disagreement".

To advance rational inquiry, MacIntyre argues that lectures ought to take account of the tradition-constituted roles both of lecturer and of student. Lecturers as members of explicitly articulated traditions should engage students, recognized as standing in various relationships to the lecturer's own and/or rival traditions, on material situated in the historically contextualised progress of the lecturer's home tradition. In support of such lectures and of tradition-bound inquiry on the research front, universities should become forums for growing and engaging rival traditions. For students, such forums would invite intentional formation within a tradition, and support learning how to profitably confront rival traditions through imaginative participation in them. For researchers, inquiry at the frontier must advance toward holistic, inter-disciplinary accounts, at once both theoretical and practical, undertaken together by members of communities of practitioners bound together in traditions. Such tradition-bound inquiry contributes to the advancement of researchers' host traditions on their own terms. Moreover, undertaking such inquiry in a reformed university setting would support encounters among host traditions and their rivals, and thus visibility as traditions both to themselves and to others through imaginative engagement with rival perspectives. The public hosting of such engagements at suitably-reformed universities, including opportunities for agreement from complementary perspectives and for sharpening differences, would support both adjudication among the mutual claims to rational superiority among rival traditions, and initiation of students into the skill sets required to profitably join and assess such encounters.

=== Dependent Rational Animals (1999) ===
While After Virtue attempted to give an account of the virtues exclusively by recourse to social practices and the understanding of individual selves in light of "quests" and "traditions," Dependent Rational Animals was a self-conscious effort by MacIntyre to ground virtues in an account of biology, according to the view of Aquinas. MacIntyre writes the following of this shift in the preface to the book: "Although there is indeed good reason to repudiate important elements in Aristotle's biology, I now judge that I was in error in supposing an ethics independent of biology to be possible."

More specifically, Dependent Rational Animals tries to make a holistic case on the basis of our best current knowledge (as opposed to an ahistorical, foundational claim) that "human vulnerability and disability" are the "central features of human life" and that Thomistic "virtues of dependency" are needed for individual human beings to flourish in their passage from stages of infancy to adulthood and old age. As MacIntyre puts it:

It is most often to others that we owe our survival, let alone our flourishing ... It will be a central thesis of this book that the virtues that we need, if we are to develop from our animal condition into that of independent rational agents, and the virtues that we need, if we are to confront and respond to vulnerability and disability both in ourselves and in others, belong to one and the same set of virtues, the distinctive virtues of dependent rational animals

Engaging with scientific texts on human biology as well as works of philosophical anthropology, MacIntyre identifies the human species as existing on a continuous scale of both intelligence and dependency with other animals such as dolphins. One of his main goals is to undermine what he sees as the fiction of the disembodied, independent reasoner who determines ethical and moral questions autonomously and what he calls the "illusion of self-sufficiency" that runs through much of Western ethics culminating in Nietzsche's Übermensch. In its place he tries to show that our embodied dependencies are a definitive characteristic of our species and reveal the need for certain kinds of virtuous dispositions if we are ever to flourish into independent reasoners capable of weighing the intellectual intricacies of moral philosophy in the first place.

=== Virtue ethics ===
MacIntyre is a key figure in the recent surge of interest in virtue ethics, which identifies the central question of morality as having to do with the habits and knowledge concerning how to live a good life. His approach seeks to demonstrate that good judgment emanates from good character. Being a good person is not about seeking to follow formal rules. In elaborating this approach, MacIntyre understands himself to be reworking the Aristotelian idea of an ethical teleology.

MacIntyre emphasizes the importance of moral goods defined in respect to a community engaged in a 'practice'—which he calls 'internal goods' or 'goods of excellence'—rather than focusing on the practice-independent obligation of a moral agent (deontological ethics) or the consequences of a particular act (utilitarianism). Before its recent resurgence, virtue ethics in European/American academia had been primarily associated with pre-modern philosophers (e.g. Plato, Aristotle, Thomas Aquinas). MacIntyre has argued that Aquinas' synthesis of Augustinianism with Aristotelianism is more insightful than modern moral theories by focusing upon the telos ('end', or completion) of social practice and of human life, within the context of which the morality of acts may be evaluated. His seminal work in the area of virtue ethics can be found in his 1981 book, After Virtue.

MacIntyre intends the idea of virtue to supplement, rather than replace, moral rules. Indeed, he describes certain moral rules as 'exceptionless' or unconditional. MacIntyre considers his work to be outside "virtue ethics" due to his affirmation of virtues as embedded in specific, historically grounded, social practices.

=== Political philosophy ===
Politically, MacIntyre's ethics informs a defence of the Aristotelian 'goods of excellence' internal to practices against the modern pursuit of 'external goods', such as money, power, and status, that are characteristic of rule-based, utilitarian, Weberian modern institutions. He has been described as a 'revolutionary Aristotelian' because he attempted to combine historical insights from his Marxist past with those of Thomas Aquinas and Aristotle after MacIntyre's conversion to Catholicism. For him, liberalism and postmodern consumerism not only justify capitalism but also sustain and inform it over the long term. At the same time, he says that "Marxists have always fallen back into relatively straightforward versions of Kantianism or utilitarianism" (After Virtue, p. 261) and criticizes Marxism as just another form of radical individualism. He says about Marxists that "as they move towards power, they always tend to become Weberians." Informed by that critique, Aristotelianism loses its sense of elitist complacency; moral excellence ceases to be part of a particular, historical practice in ancient Greece and becomes a universal quality of those who understand that good judgment emanates from good character.

In 1951 in student debates at Manchester, MacIntyre described himself as a Disraeli Tory but later was a member of the Communist Party of Great Britain (leaving in 1956), briefly of the Socialist Labour League, and later of the Socialist Review Group/International Socialists.

== Personal life ==
MacIntyre was married three times. From 1953 to 1963, he was married to Ann Peri, with whom he had two daughters, Jean and Toni. From 1963 to 1977, he was married to former teacher and now poet Susan Willans, with whom he had a son and daughter. From 1977 to his death, he was married to philosopher Lynn Joy, who is also on the philosophy faculty at Notre Dame.

=== Religious views ===
MacIntyre converted to Catholicism in the early 1980s, and subsequently conducted work against the background of what he calls an "Augustinian Thomist approach to moral philosophy." In an interview with Prospect, MacIntyre explains that his conversion to Catholicism occurred in his fifties as a "result of being convinced of Thomism while attempting to disabuse his students of its authenticity." Also, in his book Whose Justice, Which Rationality? there is a section towards the end that is perhaps autobiographical when he explains how one is chosen by a tradition and may reflect his own conversion to Catholicism.

Fuller accounts of MacIntyre's view of the relationship between philosophy and religion in general and Thomism and Catholicism in particular can be found in his essays "Philosophy recalled to its tasks" and "Truth as a good" (both found in the collection The Tasks of Philosophy) as well as in the survey of the Catholic philosophical tradition he gives in God, Philosophy and Universities.

== Works ==
- 1953. Marxism: An Interpretation. London, SCM Press.
- 1955. (edited with Antony Flew). New Essays in Philosophical Theology. London: SCM Press.
- 1958, 2004. The Unconscious: A Conceptual Analysis. Second edition. London: Routledge & Kegan Paul.
- 1959. Difficulties in Christian Belief. London: SCM Press.
- 1965. Hume's Ethical Writings. (ed.) New York: Collier.
- 1966, 1998. A Short History of Ethics. Second edition. London and New York: Routledge & Kegan Paul.
- 1967. Secularization and Moral Change. The Riddell Memorial Lectures. Oxford University Press.
- 1968, 1995. Marxism and Christianity. Second edition. London: Duckworth.
- 1969. (with Paul Ricoeur). The Religious Significance of Atheism. New York: Columbia University Press.
- 1970. Herbert Marcuse: An Exposition and a Polemic. New York: The Viking Press.
- 1970. Marcuse. Fontana Modern Masters. London: Collins.
- 1970. Sociological Theory and Philosophical Analysis (anthology co-edited with Dorothy Emmet). London and Basingstoke: Macmillan.
- 1971. Against the Self-Images of the Age: Essays on Ideology and Philosophy. London: Duckworth.
- 1972. Hegel: A Collection of Critical Essays. (ed.) Doubleday.
- 1981, 2007. After Virtue. Third edition. University of Notre Dame Press.
- 1988. Whose Justice? Which Rationality? University of Notre Dame Press.
- 1990. Three Rival Versions of Moral Enquiry. The Gifford Lectures. University of Notre Dame Press.
- 1990. First Principles, Final Ends, and Contemporary Philosophical Issues. The Aquinas Lecture. Milwaukee: Marquette University Press.
- 1998. The MacIntyre Reader, Knight, Kelvin, ed. Notre Dame, IN: University of Notre Dame Press.
- 1999. Dependent Rational Animals: Why Human Beings Need the Virtues. Chicago: Open Court. ISBN 9780812694529
- 2001. (with Anthony Rudd and John Davenport). Kierkegaard After Macintyre: Essays on Freedom, Narrative, and Virtue. Chicago: Open Court.
- 2005. Edith Stein: A Philosophical Prologue, 1913–1922. Rowman & Littlefield Publishers.
- 2006. The Tasks of Philosophy: Selected Essays, Volume 1. Cambridge University Press.
- 2006. Ethics and Politics: Selected Essays, Volume 2. Cambridge University Press.
- 2006. "The End of Education: The Fragmentation of the American University". Commonweal, 20 October 2006 / Volume CXXXIII, Number 18.
- 2009. Alasdair MacIntyre's Engagement with Marxism: Selected Writings, 1953–1974, Blackledge, Paul and Neil Davidson, eds. Haymarket.
- 2009. God, Philosophy, Universities: A Selective History of the Catholic Philosophical Tradition. Lanham, MD: Rowman & Littlefield.
- 2009. "The Nature of The Virtues" in Living Ethics. Minch and Weigel, eds.
- 2016. Ethics in the Conflicts of Modernity: An Essay on Desire, Practical Reasoning, and Narrative. Cambridge: Cambridge University Press. ISBN 9781316629604

== See also ==
- Analytical Thomism
