= Hierocles (Stoic) =

Roman philosopher

Hierocles (Greek: Ἱεροκλῆς; fl. 2nd century CE) was a Stoic philosopher. Very little is known about his life. Aulus Gellius mentions him as one of his contemporaries, and describes him as a "grave and holy man."

== Work ==
Hierocles is famous for a book called Elements of Ethics (Greek: Ἠθικὴ στοιχείωσις), part of which was discovered as a papyrus fragment at Hermopolis in 1901. This 300 line fragment discusses self-perception, and argues that all birds, reptiles, and mammals from the moment of birth perceive themselves continuously and that self-perception is both the primary and the most basic faculty of animals. The argument draws heavily on a Stoic concept known as self-ownership or oikeiôsis (Greek: οἰκείωσις) which was based on the view that all animals behave in a self-preserving way and are not just aware of themselves, but are aware of themselves in relation of other animals. Hierocles's argument about self-perception was part of the groundwork for an entire theory of ethics.

Some other fragments of Hierocles' writings are preserved by Stobaeus. The most famous fragment describes Stoic cosmopolitanism through the use of concentric circles in regard to oikeiôsis. Hierocles describes individuals as consisting of a series of circles: the first circle is the human mind, next comes the immediate family, followed by the extended family, and then the local community. Next comes the community of neighbouring towns, followed by your country, and finally the entire human race. Our task, according to Hierocles was to draw the circles in towards the centre, transferring people to the inner circles, making all human beings part of our concern. Contemporary Stoic philosophers Kai Whiting and Leonidas Konstantakos, added a further circle of concern to the original set to reflect a Stoic's relationship, and duty of care towards the environment, as discussed in their book Being Better: Stoicism for a World Worth Living In and various academic papers.
