= Virtue ethics =

Normative ethical theories

Virtue ethics (also aretaic ethics, (Note: Pronounced /ˌærəˈteɪ.ɪk/.) from Greek ἀρετή [aretḗ]) is a theory in normative ethics that prioritizes the development of moral character and dispositions (good habits), contrary to ethical systems that emphasize individual actions, duties, or obedience to divine authority.

Virtue ethics is usually contrasted with two other major normative theories: consequentialism, which defines moral rightness by the goodness of an action's outcome, and deontology, which defines rightness in terms of moral duty. Instead, virtue ethics defines rightness in terms of motive, intrinsic to a moral agent and their propensity to behave in a certain way under given circumstances. While it does not necessarily deny the importance of goodness of states of affairs or moral obligations, it emphasizes virtue and sometimes other concepts, like eudaimonia, to a greater extent than other ethics theories.

== Key concepts ==
=== Virtue and vice ===
In virtue ethics, a virtue is a characteristic disposition to think, feel, and act well in some domain of life. In contrast, a vice is a characteristic disposition to think, feel, and act poorly in some domain of life. Virtues are not everyday habits; they are character traits, in the sense that they are central to someone's personality and what they are like as a person.

In early versions and some modern versions of virtue ethics, a virtue is defined as a character trait that promotes or exhibits human "flourishing and well being" in the person who exhibits it. Some modern versions of virtue ethics do not define virtues in terms of well being or flourishing, and some go so far as to define virtues as traits that tend to promote some other good that is defined independently of the virtues, thereby subsuming virtue ethics under (or somehow merging it with) consequentialist ethics.

To Aristotle, a virtue was not a skill that made a person better able to achieve eudaimonia but was itself an expression of eudaimonia.

Aristotle

=== Virtue and emotion ===
In ancient Greek and modern eudaimonic virtue ethics, virtues and vices are complex dispositions that involve both affective and intellectual components. That is, they are dispositions that involve both being able to reason well about the right thing to do (see below on phronesis), and also to engage emotions and feelings correctly.

For example, a generous person can reason well about when and how to help people, and such a person also helps people with pleasure and without conflict. In this, virtuous people are contrasted not only with vicious people (who reason poorly about what to do and are emotionally attached to the wrong things) and with the incontinent (who are tempted by their feelings into doing the wrong thing even though they know what is right), but also with the merely continent (whose emotions tempt them toward doing the wrong thing but whose strength of will empowers them to do what they know is right).

According to Rosalind Hursthouse, in Aristotelian virtue ethics, the emotions have moral significance because "virtues (and vices) are all dispositions not only to act, but to feel emotions, as reactions as well as impulses to action... [and] In the person with the virtues, these emotions will be felt on the right occasions, toward the right people or objects, for the right reasons, where 'right' means 'correct'..."

=== Phronesis and eudaimonia ===
Phronesis (φρόνησις; prudence, practical virtue, or practical wisdom) is an acquired trait that enables its possessor to identify the best thing to do in any given situation. Unlike theoretical wisdom, practical reason results in action or decision. As John McDowell puts it, practical wisdom involves a "perceptual sensitivity" to what a situation requires.

Eudaimonia (εὐδαιμονία) is a state variously translated from Greek as 'well-being', 'happiness', 'blessedness', and in the context of virtue ethics, 'human flourishing'. Eudaimonia in this sense is not a subjective, but an objective, state. It characterizes the well-lived life.

According to Aristotle, the most prominent exponent of eudaimonia in the Western philosophical tradition, eudaimonia defines the goal of human life. It consists of exercising the characteristic human quality—reason—as the soul's most proper and nourishing activity. In his Nicomachean Ethics, Aristotle, like Plato before him, argued that the pursuit of eudaimonia is an "activity of the soul in accordance with perfect virtue", which further could only properly be exercised in the characteristic human community—the polis or city-state.

Although eudaimonia was first popularized by Aristotle, it now belongs to the tradition of virtue theories generally. For the virtue theorist, eudaimonia describes that state achieved by the person who lives the proper human life, an outcome that can be reached by practicing the virtues. A virtue is a habit or quality that allows the bearer to succeed at his, her, or its purpose. The virtue of a knife, for example, is sharpness; among the virtues of a racehorse is speed. Thus, to identify the virtues for human beings, one must have an account of what is the human purpose.

Not all modern virtue ethics theories are eudaimonic; some propose another end in place of eudaimonia, while others are non-teleological: that is, they do not account for virtues in terms of the results that the practice of the virtues produce or tend to produce.

== History of virtue ==
Like much of the Western tradition, virtue theory originated in ancient Greek philosophy.

Virtue ethics began with Socrates, and was subsequently developed further by Plato, Aristotle, and the Stoics. Virtue ethics concentrates on the character of the individual, rather than the acts (or consequences thereof) of the individual. There is debate among adherents of virtue ethics concerning what specific virtues are praiseworthy. However, most theorists agree that ethics is demonstrated by the practice of virtues.

Plato and Aristotle's treatments of virtues are not the same. Plato believes virtue is effectively an end to be sought, for which a friend might be a useful means. Aristotle states that the virtues function more as means to safeguard human relations, particularly authentic friendship, without which one's quest for happiness is frustrated.

Discussion of what were known as the four cardinal virtues—wisdom, justice, fortitude, and temperance—can be found in Plato's Republic. The virtues also figure prominently in Aristotle's ethical theory found in Nicomachean Ethics.

Virtue theory was inserted into the study of history by moralistic historians such as Livy, Plutarch, and Tacitus. The Greek idea of the virtues was passed on in Roman philosophy through Cicero and later incorporated into Christian moral theology by Ambrose of Milan. During the scholastic period, the most comprehensive consideration of the virtues from a theological perspective was provided by Thomas Aquinas in his Summa Theologiae and his Commentaries on the Nicomachean Ethics.

Eastern Orthodox accounts of virtue ethics connect moral formation with theosis, or deification. Perry T. Hamalis and Aristotle Papanikolaou describe human flourishing as progressive participation in theosis, cultivated through liturgy and ascetic practice and expressed through the virtues, especially love.

After the Reformation, Aristotle's Nicomachean Ethics continued to be the main authority for the discipline of ethics at Protestant universities until the late seventeenth century, with over fifty Protestant commentaries published on the Nicomachean Ethics before 1682.

Though the tradition receded into the background of European philosophical thought in the next few centuries, the term "virtue" remained current during this period, and in fact appears prominently in the tradition of classical republicanism or classical liberalism. This tradition was prominent in the intellectual life of 16th-century Italy, as well as 17th- and 18th-century Britain and America. The term "virtue" appears frequently in the work of Niccolò Machiavelli, David Hume, the republicans of the English Civil War period, the 18th-century English Whigs, and the prominent figures among the Scottish Enlightenment and the American Founding Fathers.

=== Contemporary "aretaic turn" ===
Although some Enlightenment philosophers (e.g. Hume) continued to emphasise the virtues, with the ascendancy of utilitarianism and deontological ethics, virtue theory moved to the margins of Western philosophy. The contemporary revival of virtue theory is frequently traced to the philosopher Elizabeth Anscombe's 1958 essay "Modern Moral Philosophy". Following this:

- In the 1976 paper "The Schizophrenia of Modern Ethical Theories", Michael Stocker summarises the main aretaic criticisms of deontological and consequentialist ethics.
- Philosopher, psychologist, and encyclopedist Mortimer Adler appealed to Aristotelian ethics, and the virtue theory of happiness or eudaimonia throughout his published work.
- Philippa Foot published a collection of essays in 1978 entitled Virtues and Vices.
- Alasdair MacIntyre made an effort to reconstruct a virtue-based theory in dialogue with the problems of modern and postmodern thought; his works include After Virtue, where he recommends Aristotle's account of the virtues, and Three Rival Versions of Moral Enquiry, where he recommends Thomism.
- Paul Ricoeur accorded an important place to Aristotelian teleological ethics in his hermeneutical phenomenology of the subject, most notably in his book Oneself as Another.
- Theologian Stanley Hauerwas found the language of virtue helpful in his own project.
- Richard Clyde Taylor argues for the restoration of classical virtues as the basis for morality in Virtue Ethics An Introduction (1991)
- Roger Crisp and Michael Slote edited a collection of important essays titled Virtue Ethics.
- Martha Nussbaum and Amartya Sen employed virtue theory in theorising the capability approach to international development.
- Julia Annas wrote The Morality of Happiness (1993).
- Lawrence C. Becker identified current virtue theory with Greek Stoicism in A New Stoicism. (1998).
- Rosalind Hursthouse published On Virtue Ethics (1999).
- Psychologist Martin Seligman drew on classical virtue ethics in conceptualizing positive psychology.
- Psychologist Daniel Goleman opens his book on emotional intelligence with a challenge from Aristotle's Nicomachean Ethics.
- Michael Sandel discusses Aristotelian ethics to support his ethical theory of justice in his book Justice: What's the Right Thing to Do?

The aretaic turn in moral philosophy is paralleled by analogous developments in other philosophical disciplines. One of these is epistemology, where a distinctive virtue epistemology was developed by Linda Zagzebski and others. In political theory, there has been discussion of "virtue politics", and in legal theory, there is a small but growing body of literature on virtue jurisprudence. The aretaic turn also exists in American constitutional theory, where proponents argue for an emphasis on virtue and vice of constitutional adjudicators.

Aretaic approaches to morality, epistemology, and jurisprudence have been the subject of intense debates. One criticism focuses on the problem of guidance; one opponent, Robert Louden in his article "Some Vices of Virtue Ethics", questions whether the idea of a virtuous moral actor, believer, or judge can provide the guidance necessary for action, belief formation, or the resolution of legal disputes.

== Lists of virtues ==
There are several lists of virtues. Socrates argued that virtue is knowledge, which suggests that there is really only one virtue. The Stoics identified four cardinal virtues: wisdom, justice, courage, and temperance. Wisdom is subdivided into good sense, good calculation, quick-wittedness, discretion, and resourcefulness. Justice is subdivided into piety, honesty, equity, and fair dealing. Courage is subdivided into endurance, confidence, high-mindedness, cheerfulness, and industriousness. Temperance or moderation is subdivided into good discipline, seemliness, modesty, and self-control.

John McDowell argues that virtue is a "perceptual capacity" to identify how one ought to act, and that all particular virtues are merely "specialized sensitivities" to a range of reasons for acting.

=== Aristotle's list ===
Aristotle identifies 12 virtues that demonstrate a person is performing their human function well. He distinguished virtues pertaining to emotion and desire from those relating to the mind. The first he calls moral virtues, and the second intellectual virtues (though both are "moral" in the modern sense of the word).

==== Moral virtues ====
Aristotle suggested that each moral virtue was a golden mean between two corresponding vices, one of excess and one of deficiency. Each intellectual virtue is a mental skill or habit by which the mind arrives at truth, affirming what is or denying what is not. In the Nicomachean Ethics he discusses 11 moral virtues:

Dimension	Excess	Golden mean	Deficiency
Fear and confidence	Rashness	Courage in the face of fear	Cowardice
Pleasure and pain	Self-indulgence	Temperance in the face of pleasure and pain	Insensibility
Getting and spending (minor)	Prodigality	Liberality with wealth and possessions	Illiberality
Getting and spending (major)	Vulgarity	Magnificence with great wealth and possessions	Pettiness
Honor and dishonor (major)	Vanity	Magnanimity with great honors	Pusillanimity
Honor and dishonor (minor)	Empty vanity	Proper ambition with normal honors	Unambitiousness
Anger	Irascibility	Patience	Lack of spirit
Self-expression	Boastfulness	Honesty with self-expression	False modesty
Conversation	Buffoonery	Wittiness in conversation	Boorishness
Social conduct	Obsequiousness	Friendliness in social conduct	Cantankerousness
Indignation	Envy	Justice and righteous indignation in the face of injury	Spitefulness

==== Intellectual virtues ====
1. Nous (intelligence), which apprehends fundamental truths (such as definitions, self-evident principles)
2. Episteme (science), which is skill with inferential reasoning (such as proofs, syllogisms, demonstrations)
3. Sophia (theoretical wisdom), which combines fundamental truths with valid, necessary inferences to reason well about unchanging truths.

Aristotle also mentions several other traits:

- Gnome (good sense) – passing judgment, "sympathetic understanding"
- Synesis (understanding) – comprehending what others say, does not issue commands
- Phronesis (practical wisdom) – knowledge of what to do, knowledge of changing truths, issues commands
- Techne (art, craftsmanship)

Aristotle's list is not the only list, however. As Alasdair MacIntyre observed in After Virtue, thinkers as diverse as Homer, the authors of the New Testament, Thomas Aquinas, and Benjamin Franklin have all proposed lists. Walter Kaufmann proposed as the four cardinal virtues: ambition/humility ("humbition"), love, courage, and honesty.

== Criticisms ==
=== Subsumed in deontology and utilitarianism ===
Martha Nussbaum suggested that while virtue ethics is often considered to be anti-Enlightenment, "suspicious of theory and respectful of the wisdom embodied in local practices", it is actually neither fundamentally distinct from, nor does it qualify as a rival approach to deontology and utilitarianism. She argues that philosophers from these two Enlightenment traditions often include theories of virtue. She pointed out that Kant's "Doctrine of Virtue" (in The Metaphysics of Morals) "covers most of the same topics as do classical Greek theories", "that he offers a general account of virtue, in terms of the strength of the will in overcoming wayward and selfish inclinations; that he offers detailed analyses of standard virtues such as courage and self-control, and of vices, such as avarice, mendacity, servility, and pride; that, although in general, he portrays inclination as inimical to virtue, he also recognizes that sympathetic inclinations offer crucial support to virtue, and urges their deliberate cultivation."

Nussbaum also points to considerations of virtue by utilitarians such as Henry Sidgwick (The Methods of Ethics), Jeremy Bentham (The Principles of Morals and Legislation), and John Stuart Mill, who writes of moral development as part of an argument for the moral equality of women (The Subjection of Women). She argues that contemporary virtue ethicists such as Alasdair MacIntyre, Bernard Williams, Philippa Foot, and John McDowell have few points of agreement and that the common core of their work does not represent a break from Kant.

=== Kantian critique ===
Immanuel Kant's position on virtue ethics is contested. Those who argue that Kantian deontology conflicts with virtue ethics include Alasdair MacIntyre, Philippa Foot, and Bernard Williams. In the Groundwork of the Metaphysics of Morals and the Critique of Practical Reason, Immanuel Kant offers many different criticisms of ethical frameworks and against moral theories before him. Kant rarely mentioned Aristotle by name but did not exclude his moral philosophy of virtue ethics from his critique. Many Kantian arguments against virtue ethics claim that virtue ethics is inconsistent, or sometimes that it is not a real moral theory at all.

In "What Is Virtue Ethics All About?", Gregory Velazco y Trianosky identified the key points of divergence between virtue ethicists and what he called "neo-Kantianism", in the form these nine neo-Kantian moral assertions:

1. The crucial moral question is "what is it right/obligatory to do?"
2. Moral judgments are those that concern the rightness of actions.
3. Such judgments take the form of rules or principles.
4. Such rules or principles are universal.
5. They are not based on some concept of human good that is independent of moral goodness.
6. They take the form of categorical imperatives that can be justified independently of the desires of the person they apply to.
7. They are motivating; they can compel action in an agent, also independently of that agent's desires.
8. An action, in order to be morally virtuous, must be motivated by this sort of moral judgment (not, for example, merely coincidentally aligned with it).
9. The virtuousness of a character trait, or virtue, derives from the relationship that trait has to moral judgments, rules, and principles.

Trianosky says that modern sympathizers with virtue ethics almost all reject neo-Kantian claim #1, and many of them also reject certain of the other claims.

=== Utopianism and pluralism ===
Robert B. Louden criticizes virtue ethics on the basis that it promotes a form of unsustainable utopianism. Trying to arrive at a single set of virtues is immensely difficult in contemporary societies as, according to Louden, they contain "more ethnic, religious, and class groups than did the moral community which Aristotle theorized about" with each of these groups having "not only its own interests but its own set of virtues as well". Louden notes in passing that MacIntyre, a supporter of virtue-based ethics, has grappled with this in After Virtue but that ethics cannot dispense with building rules around acts and rely only on discussing the moral character of persons.

== Topics in virtue ethics ==
=== Virtue ethics as a category ===
Virtue contrasts with deontological and consequentialist ethics; the three are the most predominant contemporary normative-ethical theories. Deontological ethics, sometimes referred to as duty ethics, emphasizes adherence to ethical principles or duties. How these duties are defined, however, is often a subject of debate. One rule scheme used by deontologists is divine command theory. Deontology also depends upon meta-ethical realism in postulating the existence of moral absolutes, regardless of circumstances. Immanuel Kant is considered a foremost theorist of deontological ethics.

The next predominant school of thought in normative ethics is consequentialism. While deontology emphasizes doing one's duty, consequentialism bases the morality of an action on its outcome. Instead of saying that one has a moral duty to abstain from murder, a consequentialist would say that we should abstain from murder because it has undesirable effects. The main contention is what outcomes should (or can) be identified as objectively desirable.

John Stuart Mill's greatest happiness principle is a commonly-adopted criterion of what is objectively desirable. Mill asserts that the desirability of an action is the net amount of happiness it brings, the number of people it brings happiness to, and the duration of that happiness. He tries to delineate classes of happiness, some preferable to others, but classifying such a concept is difficult.

A virtue ethicist identifies virtues (also known as desirable characteristics) that a good person embodies. Exhibiting these virtues is the aim of ethics, and one's actions are a reflection of one's virtues. To the virtue philosopher, action cannot be used as a demarcation of morality because a virtue encompasses more than a selection of an action; it is a way of being that leads the person exhibiting the virtue to consistently make certain types of choices. There is disagreement in virtue ethics about what are, and what are not, virtues. There are also difficulties in identifying the "virtuous" action to take in all circumstances, and how to define a virtue.

Consequentialist and deontological theories often still employ the term virtue in a restricted sense: as a tendency (or disposition) to adhere to the system's principles or rules. In those theories, virtue is secondary and the principles (or rules) are primary. These differing senses of what constitutes virtue are a potential source of confusion. Dogmatic claims about the purpose of human life, or about what a good life is for human beings, are typically controversial.

=== Virtue and politics ===
Virtue theory emphasizes Aristotle's belief in the polis as the acme of political organization, and the role of the virtues in enabling human beings to flourish in that environment. In contrast, classical republicanism emphasizes Tacitus's concern that power and luxury can corrupt individuals and destroy liberty, as Tacitus perceived in the transformation of the Roman Republic into the Roman Empire. Virtue for classical republicans is a shield against this sort of corruption and a means to preserve the good life one has, rather than a means by which to achieve the good life one does not yet have. Another way to put the distinction between the two traditions is that virtue ethics relies on Aristotle's fundamental distinction between the human-being-as-he-is from the human-being-as-he-should-be, while classical republicanism relies on the Tacitean distinction of the risk-of-becoming.

Virtue ethics has a number of contemporary applications:

Social and political philosophy

Within the field of social ethics, Deirdre McCloskey argues that virtue ethics can provide a basis for a balanced approach to understanding capitalism and capitalist societies.

Education

Within the field of philosophy of education, James Page argues that virtue ethics can provide a rationale and foundation for peace education.

Health care and medical ethics

Thomas Alured Faunce argued that whistleblowing in healthcare settings would be more respected within clinical governance pathways if it had a firmer academic foundation in virtue ethics. He called for whistleblowing to be expressly supported in the UNESCO Universal Declaration on Bioethics and Human Rights. Barry Schwartz argues that "practical wisdom" is an antidote to much of the inefficient and inhumane bureaucracy of modern health care systems.

Technology and the virtues

In her book Technology and the Virtues, Shannon Vallor proposed a series of "technomoral" virtues that people need to cultivate in order to flourish in our socio-technological world: honesty (respecting truth), self-control (becoming the author of our desires), humility (knowing what we do not know), justice (upholding rightness), courage (intelligent fear and hope), empathy (compassionate concern for others), care (loving service to others), civility (making common cause), flexibility (skillful adaptation to change), perspective (holding on to the moral whole), and magnanimity (moral leadership and nobility of spirit).

== See also ==
- Applied ethics – Practical application of moral considerations
- Arete – Greek philosophical concept
- Buddhist ethics (discipline)
- Confucianism – Chinese ethical and philosophical system
- Cynicism (philosophy) – Ancient school of philosophy
- Environmental virtue ethics – Way of approaching environmental ethics through the lens of virtue ethics
- Modern Stoicism – Ancient philosophy
- Phronesis – Ancient Greek word for a type of wisdom or intelligence
- Rule according to higher law – Belief that universal principles of morality override unjust laws
- Seven virtues – Seven virtues in Christian tradition
- Stoicism – Ancient philosophy
- Tirukkuṟaḷ – Ancient Tamil composition on personal ethics and morality
- Virtue epistemology – Philosophical approach
- Virtue jurisprudence – Virtue ethics applied to jurisprudence
- Virtue signalling – Pejorative term
- Golden mean (philosophy) – Aphorism against extremism
