= Sentimental =

Sentimental, the adjectival form of sentimentality, may also refer to:

== Films ==
- Sentimental (film), a 1981 Argentinian film show
- Sentimental, a 2020 Spanish comedy film also known as The People Upstairs

== Music ==
=== Albums ===
- Sentimental (Julio Iglesias album), 1980
- Sentimental (Tanita Tikaram album), 2005

=== Songs ===
- "Sentimental" (Deborah Cox song), 1995
- "Sentimental" (Kenny G composition), 1992
- "Sentimental" (Los Hermanos song), 2001
- "Sentimental", by Altered Images from Happy Birthday, 2004 reissue
- "Sentimental", by Donna Summer from Another Place and Time, 1989
- "Sentimental", by Feeder from Renegades, 2010
- "Sentimental", by the Four Voices, 1957
- "Sentimental", by Hiromi Iwasaki, 1975
- "Sentimental", by Kym Marsh from Standing Tall, 2003
- "Sentimental", by Porcupine Tree from Fear of a Blank Planet, 2007
- "Senti-Mental", by Pvris from Evergreen, 2023

== See also ==
- Sentimental novel, a genre of novels
- Sentimentality
- Sentimentalism (philosophy)
- Sentimentalism (literature)
- Sentimental poetry, a genre of poetry
