= Self-evidence =

Epistemologically probative proposition

In epistemology (the theory of knowledge), a self-evident proposition is a proposition that is known to be true simply by adequately understanding its meaning, without requiring proof or inference from other premises. Philosophers often characterize self-evident propositions as being knowable a priori through ordinary human reason or rational intuition.

Some epistemologists, particularly fallibilists and coherentists, deny that any proposition is genuinely self-evident. Among those who accept the concept—especially foundationalists—one's belief that oneself is conscious is frequently offered as an example of epistemic self-evidence. However, one's belief that someone else is conscious or possesses free will is not epistemically self-evident, as it relies on inference rather than direct apprehension.

A classic example often cited as self-evident is Euclid's fifth common notion: "The whole is greater than the part" (or, in modern terms, "A finite whole is greater than, or equal to, any of its parts").

Attempting to construct a logical argument to prove a genuinely self-evident conclusion is generally regarded as redundant or misguided, as any premises used to support it would typically be no more certain than the conclusion itself (see ignoratio elenchi and begging the question).

== Historical background ==
The concept of self-evidence has deep roots in Western philosophy. Aristotle argued in the Posterior Analytics that demonstrative knowledge must ultimately rest on first principles (archai) that are immediately known without further proof, in order to avoid an infinite regress of justification.

In medieval philosophy, Thomas Aquinas distinguished between propositions that are self-evident in themselves (per se nota secundum se) and those that are self-evident to us (per se nota quoad nos). According to Aquinas, a proposition is self-evident in itself when the predicate is contained in the definition of the subject, but it is only self-evident to a given person if that person understands the nature of both the subject and the predicate.

During the Age of Enlightenment, John Locke described self-evident truths in An Essay Concerning Human Understanding (1689) as objects of "intuitive knowledge," in which the mind perceives the agreement or disagreement of two ideas immediately by themselves, without the intervention of any other idea.

== Analytic propositions ==
It is sometimes said that a self-evident proposition is one whose denial is self-contradictory. It is also commonly said that an analytic proposition is one whose denial is self-contradictory. However, the two concepts are distinct, and an analytic proposition is not always a self-evident proposition.

Analyticity is a semantic or logical property concerning how a proposition's truth is determined by the meanings of its terms, whereas self-evidence is an epistemic property concerning how readily a rational agent can know or be justified in believing the proposition upon understanding it. For example, a highly complex mathematical theorem or logical tautology may be analytic—its negation entails a contradiction—yet it is not self-evident because an ordinary thinker cannot see its truth merely by understanding the statement without working through a step-by-step proof.

Conversely, provided that one adequately understands a genuinely self-evident proposition, it does not require proof; likewise, the fact that its denial is contradictory or absurd is immediately apparent rather than needing derivation. Furthermore, some philosophers—such as Immanuel Kant and modern ethical intuitionists—have argued that not all self-evident propositions are analytic, maintaining that certain synthetic a priori truths (or first-person facts such as one's own consciousness) can be self-evident without being purely definitional.

== Other uses ==
=== Informal speech ===
In informal speech, self-evident often merely means obvious or uncontroversial, whereas the epistemological definition is stricter, requiring that understanding the proposition alone provides sufficient epistemic justification for believing it.

=== Moral propositions ===
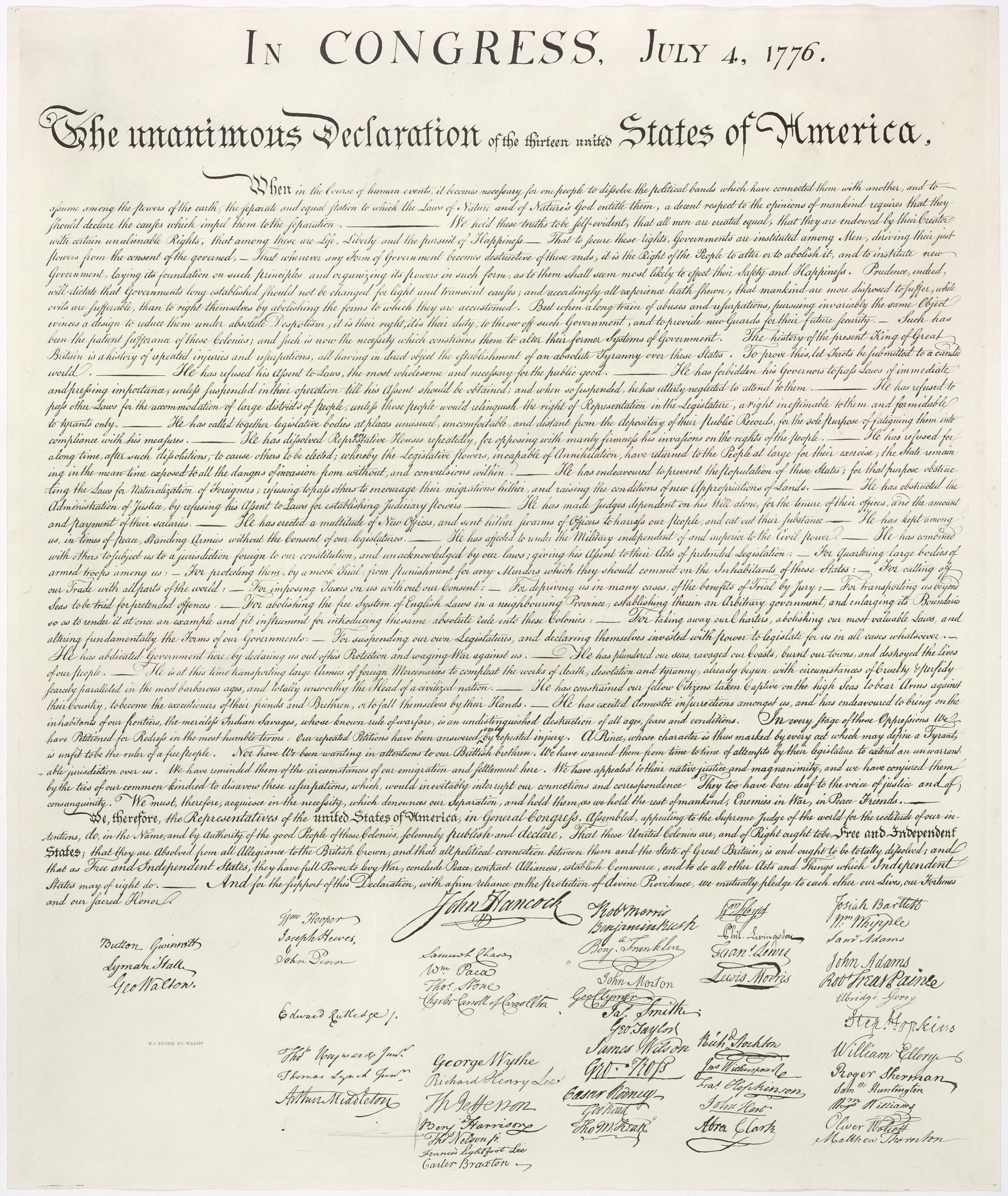
The United States Declaration of Independence famously appeals to "self-evident" moral and political truths.

Moral propositions have also been regarded as self-evident, particularly within the tradition of ethical intuitionism. The British philosopher W. D. Ross, in The Right and the Good (1930), argued that basic moral principles—which he termed prima facie duties, such as fidelity, gratitude, and non-maleficence—are self-evident once a person reaches sufficient moral maturity to understand them. This view stands in tension with the is–ought problem described by David Hume, which holds that there is no coherent logical transition from a purely descriptive statement to a normative one.

In political philosophy, Alexander Hamilton cited the following propositions as self-evident in Federalist No. 23:

- The means ought to be proportioned to the end.
- Every power ought to be commensurate with its object.
- There ought to be no limitation of a power destined to effect a purpose which is itself incapable of limitation.

A famous claim of the self-evidence of moral and political truths appears in the United States Declaration of Independence (1776), which states: "We hold these Truths to be self-evident, that all men are created equal, that they are endowed by their Creator with certain unalienable Rights, that among these are Life, Liberty and the pursuit of Happiness." Philosophically, the claim that these propositions are strictly self-evident remains widely debated.

=== Mathematics ===
In classical mathematics, self-evident referred to foundational statements that required no proof, and axioms were traditionally described as self-evident truths. With the development of non-Euclidean geometry and modern axiomatic systems in the 19th and 20th centuries, however, mathematicians largely shifted toward treating axioms as formal starting assumptions chosen for their consistency, fruitfulness, and explanatory power rather than strictly for their intuitive self-evidence.

== See also ==
- 2 + 2 = 5 § Self-evident truth and self-evident falsehood
- Axiom
- Contradiction
- Ethical intuitionism
- Foundationalism
- Infinite regress
- Introspection
- Law of identity
- Primitive notion
- Self-reference
- Self-refuting idea
