= Michael Slote =

American philosopher

Michael A. Slote is a professor of ethics at the University of Miami and an author of a number of books.

He was previously a professor of philosophy at the University of Maryland and at Trinity College Dublin. He received his Ph.D. from Harvard University.

He argues that virtue ethics, in a particular form which draws on the concept of an ethics of care, offers significant intuitive and structural advantages over deontology, utilitarianism, and common-sense morality. He has also recently endorsed the meta-ethical view of moral sentimentalism in opposition to moral rationalism (see his articles from 2003, 2004, 2005a and his books (2007 and 2010)).

Most recently he expanded his work on sentimentalism into a philosophy of mind (book 2014). In his latest work he also stresses the importance of receptivity as a virtue, a value and as a psychological characteristic (article 2014 and book 2013). The significance of receptivity feature was first considered by Nel Noddings in 1984, but did not receive further attention in the ethics of care neither was it used to criticize typical Western philosophical values. In The Impossibility of Perfection, he argues against moral perfection as it was endorsed by Aristotle and the Enlightenment and defends a more realistic view of moral issues.

== Bibliography ==
=== Books ===
- Slote, Michael (1983). Goods and virtues. Oxford: Clarendon Press.
- Common-Sense Morality and Consequentialism (1985), Routledge and Kegan Paul.
- Beyond Optimizing: A Study of Rational Choice (1989), Harvard University Press.
- From Morality to Virtue (1992), Oxford University Press.
- Morals From Motives (2001), Oxford University Press.
- The Ethics of Care and Empathy (2007), Routledge.
- Essays on the History of Ethics (2009), Oxford University Press.
- Moral Sentimentalism (2010), Oxford University Press.
- The Impossibility of Perfection: Aristotle, Feminism and the Complexities of Ethics (2011), Oxford University Press.
- From Enlightenment to Receptivity: Rethinking our Values (2013), Oxford University Press
- A Sentimentalist Theory of Mind (2014), Oxford University Press.
- Human Development and Human Life (2016), Springer.
- Between Psychology and Philosophy: East-West Themes and Beyond (2020), New York: Palgrave MacMillan

=== Essays and chapters ===
- "The Morality of Wealth" (1977) in World Hunger and Moral Obligation Prentice Hall
- "Sentimentalist Virtue and Moral Judgment: Outline of a Project" (2003) in Metaphilosophy 34(1/2), pp. 131–143; reprinted in Moral and Epistemic Virtues, Michael Brady & Duncan Pritchard (eds.), (Wiley-Blackwell, 2004).
- "Moral Sentimentalism" (2004), Ethical Theory and Moral Practice, vol. 7, no. 1, pp. 3–14.
- "Moral Sentimentalism and Moral Psychology" (2005a) in The Oxford Handbook of Ethical Theory, David Copp (ed.), Oxford University Press.
- "The Dualism of the Ethical" (2005b), Nous-Supplement: Philosophical Issues, vol. 15, pp. 209–217.
- '"The Virtue of Receptivity" (2014), Revue internationale de philosophie, vol. 68, pp. 7–19.
- "Sentimentalist Virtue Epistemology: Beyond Responsibilism and Reliabilism" (2019). In Heather Battaly (ed.)Routledge Handbook of Virtue Epistemology, New York: Routledge: 105-114.

=== Critical studies and reviews ===
- Anderson, Stephen L. (March–April 2013). "[Untitled review of The impossibility of perfection]". Books. Philosophy Now. 95: 42–44.
