= Deontology =

Class of ethical theories

In moral philosophy, deontological ethics or deontology (from Ancient Greek δέον (déon) 'duty, obligation' and -λογία (-logía) 'study of') is the normative ethical theory that the morality of an action should be based on whether that action itself is right or wrong under a series of rules and principles, rather than based on the consequences of the action. It is sometimes described as duty-, obligation-, or rule-based ethics. Deontological ethics is commonly contrasted to utilitarianism and other consequentialist theories, virtue ethics, and pragmatic ethics. In the deontological approach, the inherent rightfulness of actions is considered more important than their consequences.

The term deontological was first used to describe the current, specialised definition by C. D. Broad in his 1930 book, Five Types of Ethical Theory. Older usage of the term goes back to Jeremy Bentham, who coined it prior to 1816 as a synonym of dicastic or censorial ethics (i.e., ethics based on judgement). The more general sense of the word is retained in French, especially in the term code de déontologie (ethical code), in the context of professional ethics.

Depending on the system of deontological ethics under consideration, a moral obligation may arise from an external or internal source, such as a set of rules inherent to the universe (ethical naturalism), religious law, or a set of personal or cultural values (any of which may conflict with personal desires).

== Deontological philosophies ==
There are numerous formulations of deontological ethics.

=== Kantianism ===
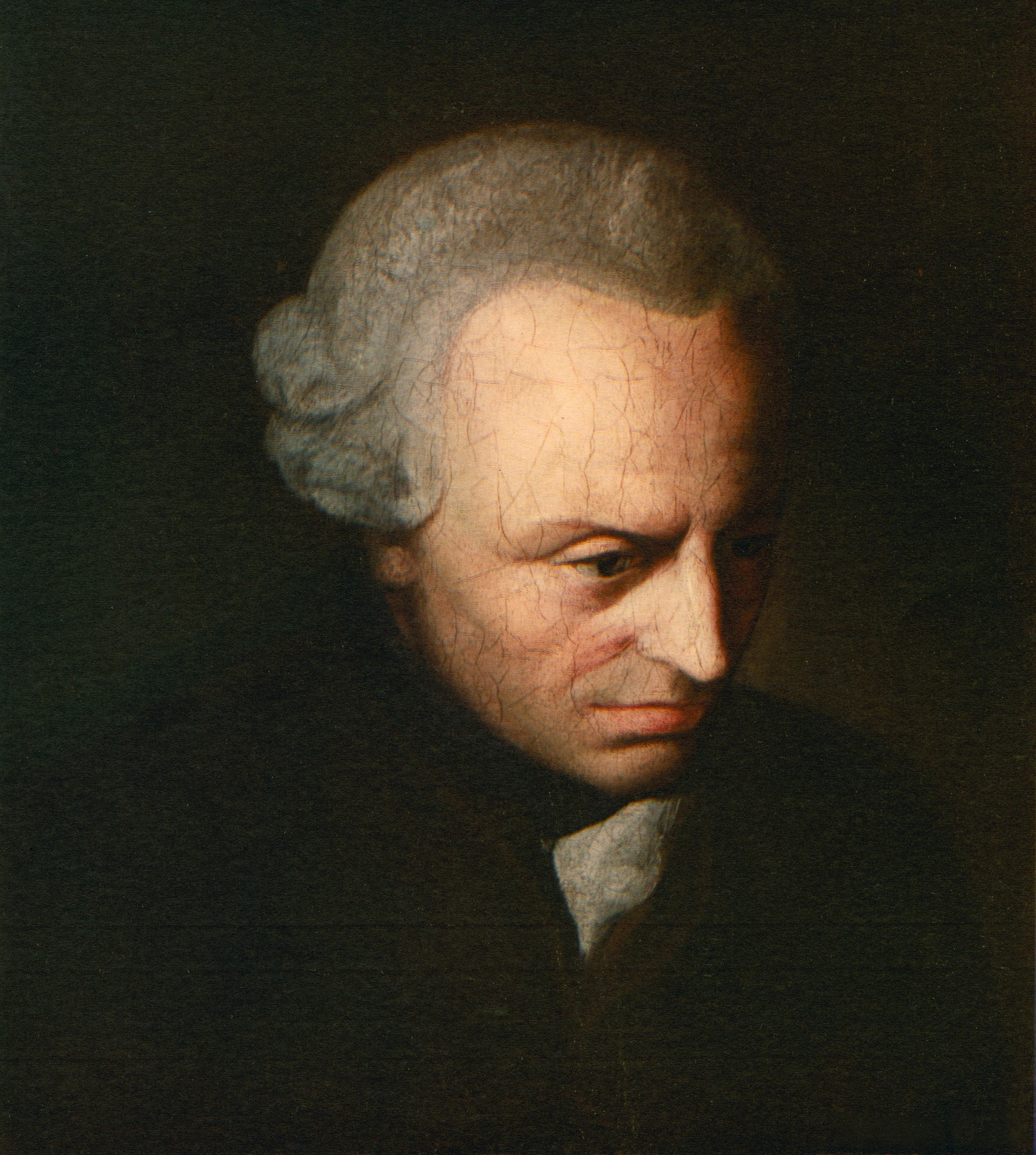
Immanuel Kant

Immanuel Kant's theory of ethics is considered deontological for several reasons. First, Kant argues that in order to act in the morally right way, people must act from duty (Pflicht). Second, Kant argued that it was not the consequences of actions that make them right or wrong, but the motives of the person who carries out the action.

Kant's first argument begins with the premise that the highest good must be both good in itself and good without qualification. Something is "good in itself" when it is intrinsically good; and is "good without qualification" when the addition of that thing never makes a situation ethically worse. Kant then argues that those things that are usually thought to be good, such as intelligence, perseverance, and pleasure, fail to be either intrinsically good or good without qualification. Pleasure, for example, appears not to be good without qualification, because when people take pleasure in watching someone suffer, this seems to make the situation ethically worse. He concludes that there is only one thing that is truly good:

Nothing in the world—indeed nothing even beyond the world—can possibly be conceived which could be called good without qualification except a good will.

Kant then argues that the consequences of an act of willing cannot be used to determine that the person has a good will; good consequences could arise by accident from an action that was motivated by a desire to cause harm to an innocent person, and bad consequences could arise from an action that was well-motivated. Instead, he claims, a person has a good will when they "act out of respect for the moral law". People "act out of respect for the moral law" when they act in some way because they have a duty to do so. Thus, the only thing that is truly good in itself is a good will, and a good will is only good when the willer chooses to do something because it is that person's duty; i.e., out of respect for the law. He defines respect as "the concept of a worth which thwarts my self-love".

Kant's three significant formulations of the categorical imperative (a way of evaluating motivations for action) are:

- Act only according to that maxim by which you can also will that it would become a universal law;
- Act in such a way that you always treat humanity, whether in your own person or in the person of any other, never simply as a means, but always at the same time as an end;
- Every rational being must so act as if he were through his maxim always a legislating member in a universal kingdom of ends.

Kant argued that the only absolutely good thing is a good will, and so the single determining factor of whether an action is morally right is the will, or motive of the person doing it. If they are acting on a bad maxim—e.g., "I will lie"—then their action is wrong, even if some good consequences come of it.

In his essay, "On a Supposed Right to Lie Because of Philanthropic Concerns", arguing against the position of Benjamin Constant, Des réactions politiques, Kant states that:

Hence a lie defined merely as an intentionally untruthful declaration to another man does not require the additional condition that it must do harm to another, as jurists require in their definition (mendacium est falsiloquium in praeiudicium alterius). For a lie always harms another; if not some human being, then it nevertheless does harm to humanity in general, inasmuch as it vitiates the very source of right [Rechtsquelle]. ... All practical principles of right must contain rigorous truth. ... This is because such exceptions would destroy the universality on account of which alone they bear the name of principles.

=== Divine command theory ===
Although not all deontologists are religious, some believe in the divine command theory, which is actually a cluster of related theories that essentially state that an action is right if God has decreed that it is right. According to English philosopher Ralph Cudworth, William of Ockham, René Descartes, and 18th-century Calvinists all accepted various versions of this moral theory, as they all held that moral obligations arise from God's commands.

The divine command theory is a form of deontology because, according to it, the rightness of any action depends upon that action being performed because it is a duty, not because of any good consequences arising from that action. If God commands people not to work on Sabbath, then people act rightly if they do not work on Sabbath because God has commanded that they do not do so. If they do not work on Sabbath because they are lazy, then their action is not, truly speaking, "right" even though the actual physical action performed is the same.

One thing that clearly distinguishes Kantian deontologism from divine command deontology is that Kantianism maintains that man, as a rational being, makes the moral law universal, whereas divine command maintains that God makes the moral law universal.

=== Ross's deontological pluralism ===
W. D. Ross objects to Kant's monistic deontology, which bases ethics in only one foundational principle, the categorical imperative. He contends that there is a plurality (7, although this number is seen to vary to interpretation) of prima facie duties determining what is right.

These duties are identified by W. D. Ross:

1. the duty of fidelity (to keep promises and to tell the truth)
2. the duty of reparation (to make amends for wrongful acts)
3. the duty of gratitude (to return kindnesses received)
4. the duty of non-injury (not to hurt others)
5. the duty of beneficence (to promote the maximum of aggregate good)
6. the duty of self-improvement (to improve one's own condition)
7. the duty of justice (to distribute benefits and burdens equally).

One problem the deontological pluralist has to face is that cases can arise where the demands of one duty violate another duty, so-called moral dilemmas. For example, there are cases where it is necessary to break a promise in order to relieve someone's distress. Ross makes use of the distinction between prima facie duties and absolute duty to solve this problem. The duties listed above are prima facie duties (moral actions that are required unless a greater obligation trumps them); they are general principles whose validity is self-evident to morally mature persons. They are factors that do not take all considerations into account. Absolute duty, on the other hand, is particular to one specific situation, taking everything into account, and has to be judged on a case-by-case basis. It is absolute duty that determines which acts are right or wrong.

=== Contemporary deontology ===
Contemporary deontologists (i.e., scholars born in the first half of the 20th century) include Józef Maria Bocheński, Thomas Nagel, T. M. Scanlon, and Roger Scruton.

Bocheński (1965) makes a distinction between deontic and epistemic authority:

- A typical example of epistemic authority in Bocheński's usage would be "the relation of a teacher to her students". A teacher has epistemic authority when making declarative sentences that the student presumes to be reliable knowledge and appropriate but feels no obligation to accept or obey.
- An example of deontic authority would be "the relation between an employer and her employee". An employer has deontic authority in the act of issuing an order that the employee is obliged to accept and obey regardless of its reliability or appropriateness.

Scruton (2017), in his book On Human Nature, is critical of consequentialism and similar ethical theories, such as hedonism and utilitarianism, instead proposing a deontological ethical approach. He implies that proportional duty and obligation are essential components of the ways in which we decide to act, and he defends natural law against opposing theories. He also expresses admiration for virtue ethics, and believes that the two ethical theories are not, as is frequently portrayed, mutually exclusive.

=== Deontology and consequentialism ===
The trolley problem, which considers whether one should divert a runaway trolley to kill one person instead of letting five people die.

==== Principle of double effect ====
The principle of double effect is a principled relaxing of the unconditional character of deontological prohibitions, particularly against the inadvertent causing of death. Phillipa Foot argues for the moral relevance of this distinction against the kinds of intuitions enjoined by utilitarian consequentialism, writing that there is a morally "relevant distinction between what we aim at and what we foresee as the result of what we do." In particular, if one aims to accomplish an act which is in itself obligatory for a definite responsibility, yet which in its particular concrete instance can be foreseen to causally result in effects which are impermissible to intend, then the principle of double effect allows the act to stand as permissible because of the above distinction between what one intends to accomplish and what one indirectly allows to happen. The standard example raised by Woodward and Phillipa Foot to distinguish between cases in a just war where a combatant attacks a military target in order to hasten the end of the war with the foreseeable effect that innocents will perish, which the principle will allow, and another where a combatant intentionally kills innocents, which the principle forbids even when the combatant pursues this for the reason of hastening the desired end of a just war.

Phillipa Foot interprets the principle generally as applying to both actions and moral spectator responses to actions which exhibit the same structure. She argues, "would it not be objectionable if, in a hospital where patients were dying for lack of a transplant, the death of someone in the hospital with several transplantable organs was automatically treated as good news?"

==== Principle of permissible harm ====
Frances Kamm's "Principle of Permissible Harm" (1996) is an effort to derive a deontological constraint that coheres with our considered case judgments while also relying heavily on Kant's categorical imperative. The principle states that one may harm in order to save more if and only if the harm is an effect or an aspect of the greater good itself. This principle is meant to address what Kamm feels are most people's considered case judgments, many of which involve deontological intuitions. For instance, Kamm argues that we believe it would be impermissible to kill one person to harvest his organs in order to save the lives of five others. Yet, we think it is morally permissible to divert a runaway trolley that would otherwise kill five innocent, immobile people, onto a sidetrack where only one innocent and immobile person will be killed. Kamm believes the Principle of Permissible Harm explains the moral difference between these and other cases, and more importantly expresses a constraint telling us exactly when we may not act to bring about good ends—such as in the organ harvesting case.

In 2007, Kamm published Intricate Ethics, a book that presents a new theory, the "Doctrine of Productive Purity", that incorporates aspects of her "Principle of Permissible Harm". Like the "Principle", the "Doctrine of Productive Purity" is an attempt to provide a deontological prescription for determining the circumstances in which people are permitted to act in a way that harms others.

==== Reconciling deontology with consequentialism ====
Various attempts have been made to reconcile deontology with consequentialism. Threshold deontology holds that rules ought to govern up to a point despite adverse consequences; but when the consequences become so dire that they cross a stipulated threshold, consequentialism takes over. Theories put forth by Thomas Nagel and Michael S. Moore attempt to reconcile deontology with consequentialism by assigning each a jurisdiction. Iain King's 2008 book How to Make Good Decisions and Be Right All the Time uses quasi-realism and a modified form of utilitarianism to develop deontological principles that are compatible with ethics based on virtues and consequences. King develops a hierarchy of principles to link his meta-ethics, which is more inclined towards consequentialism, with the deontological conclusions he presents in his book.

=== Secular deontology ===
Intuition-based deontology is a concept within secular ethics. A classical example of literature on secular ethics is the Kural text, authored by the ancient Tamil Indian philosopher Valluvar. It can be argued that some concepts from deontological ethics date back to this text. Concerning ethical intuitionism, 20th century philosopher C.D. Broad coined the term "deontological ethics" to refer to the normative doctrines associated with intuitionism, leaving the phrase "ethical intuitionism" free to refer to the epistemological doctrines.

=== Parallel concepts in Hindu philosophy ===
Scholars of comparative philosophy have noted significant deontological parallels within classical Indian philosophy, particularly in the Bhagavad Gita. The doctrine of Nishkama Karma (selfless action performed without attachment to results) dictates that an individual must perform their Dharma (righteous duty) based entirely on the inherent rightness of the action itself, rather than out of desire for its consequences or "fruits" (phala). This closely mirrors the Kantian ethical framework of "duty for duty's sake" and the prioritization of moral motive over empirical outcomes. However, while Kantian deontology grounds moral obligations strictly in human autonomy and pure rational law, the deontological framework of the Gita is fundamentally integrated with a cosmic and spiritual order aimed at spiritual liberation (Moksha).

== See also ==
- Convention (norm) – Set of agreed, stipulated, or generally accepted standards
- Categorical imperative – Central concept in Kantian moral philosophy
- Deontic logic – Field of philosophical logic
- Deontological libertarianism – Political ideology
- Lawrence Kohlberg's stages of moral development – Psychological theory describing the evolution of moral reasoning
- Meta-ethics – Branch of ethics
- Moral responsibility – Concept in ethics
- Norm (philosophy) – Sentences used to effect an action
- Plank of Carneades – Thought experiment proposed by Carneades of Cyrene
- Rule according to higher law – Belief that universal principles of morality override unjust laws
- The Right and the Good – 1930 book by W. D. Ross
- Divine command theory – Meta-ethical theory of morality
- Euthyphro dilemma – Ethical problem on the origin of morality posed by Socrates
