= Sentimentalism (literature) =

Literary movement

As a literary mode, sentimentalism, the practice of being sentimental, and thus tending towards making emotions and feelings the basis of a person's actions and reactions, as opposed to reason, has been a recurring aspect of world literature. Sentimentalism includes a variety of aspects in literature, such as sentimental poetry, the sentimental novel, and the German sentimentalist music movement, Empfindsamkeit. European literary sentimentalism arose during the Age of Enlightenment, partly as a response to sentimentalism in philosophy. In eighteenth-century England, the sentimental novel was a major literary genre. The genre developed in England between 1730 and 1780 at the time of high enlightenment from where it spread to other European literatures. Its philosophical basis primarily came from Anthony Ashley Cooper, 3rd Earl of Shaftesbury, a pupil of John Locke.

== Philosophical influences ==
Sentimentalism in philosophy and sentimentalism in literature are sometimes hard to distinguish. As the philosophical arguments developed, the literature soon tried to emulate by putting the philosophical into practice through narration and characters. As a result, it is common to observe both philosophical and literary movements simultaneously.

Philosophically, sentimentalism was often contrasted to rationalism. While eighteenth-century rationalism corresponded itself with the development of the analytic mind as the basis for acquiring truth, sentimentalism hinged upon an intrinsic human capacity to feel and how this leads to truth. For the sentimentalist this capacity was most important in morality (moral sense theory). Sentimentalists contended that where the rationalists believed morality was founded upon analytic principles (e.g. Immanuel Kant's "Categorical Imperative"), these principles could not be adequately founded in the empirical nature of humans—such as observing a sad image or expressing a strong emotion physically. Therefore, one could not obtain a sound moral theory. However, by developing moral sensibility and fine tuning the capacity to feel, a person could access a sound moral theory by building from an intrinsic human nature, which each person possessed. Sentimentalists were, thus, often seen as relating to the schools of humanism and empirical ethical intuitionism.

== Characteristics ==
Sentimentalism asserted that over-shown feeling was not a weakness but rather showed one to be a moral person. Arising from religiously motivated empathy, it expanded to the other perceptions—for example, sensual love was no longer understood as a destructive passion (Vanitas) but rather as a basis of social institutions, as it was for Antoine Houdar de la Motte. Requited love was, as in serious opera (the Tragédie en musique or Opera seria), a symbol for a successful alliance between nations. The "Lesesucht" re-evaluated what was permitted literature, and the novel as a type of literature as versus drama.

Around the middle of the century, sentimentalism set "untouched" nature against (courtly) civilization, as in the works of Jean Jacques Rousseau. In addition, Samuel Richardson's sentimental epistolary novel "Pamela, or Virtue Rewarded" (1740) had great literary influence.

The literary work often featured scenes of distress and tenderness, and the plot was arranged to advance emotions rather than action. The result was a valorization of "fine feeling," displaying the characters as a model for refined, moral and emotional effect. Sentimentalism in literature was also often used as a medium through which authors could promote their own agendas—imploring readers to empathize with the problems they are dealing with in their books.

For example, in Laurence Sterne's novel, A Sentimental Journey Through France and Italy, the narrator is using the sentimental character Yorick as a device to critique the obligation of morality, whether it is sentimental or rational. There is a scene early in the novel where Yorick meets a monk and refuses "to give him a single sous [a penny]." He feels discontent when he disregards what he senses he ought to do, even though he appears to obey "better reason" (4). Rationally, he disregards his sentimental obligation because "there is no regular reasoning upon the ebbs and flows of our humours" (6) [i.e. our emotions]. While he argues against the authority of sense, ultimately this sense creates discontent in his conscience. After the monk leaves empty handed, it is Yorick's "heart" that "smote [him] the moment [the monk] shut the door" (7). Accordingly, Yorick has "behaved very ill" (7). He has complied with his rational maxim, the justified action of his "great claims" argument (6). Yet he senses from the conscience of his sentimental nature that he has done wrong.

== Empfindsamkeit ==
In continental Europe, one aspect of sentimentalism was Empfindsamkeit. The sensitive style (German: empfindsamer Stil) of music, developed in Germany, aimed to express "true and natural" feelings, in contrast to the baroque.

The origin of sentimentalism in this context was chiefly religious, with the emotionally coloured keyboard music and lieder of Carl Philipp Emmanuel Bach being typical examples. Empfindsamkeit is also known as secularized pietism because it frequently came with moralizing content that had increasingly broken free of church and religious ties. An important theorist of the movement was Jean Baptiste Dubos.

=== In Germany ===
The musician and publisher Johann Christoph Bode translated Laurence Sterne's novel, A sentimental Journey Through France and Italy, into German in 1768 under the title Yoriks empfindsame Reise. The translation was a great success. His word "empfindsam" or "sensitive" was a neologism that then became attached to Gotthold Ephraim Lessing and the whole literary period.

German poets who verged on sentimentalism were Friedrich Gottlieb Klopstock (1724–1803), Christian Fürchtegott Gellert (1715–1769) and Sophie de La Roche (1730–1807, the author of the first epistolary novel in German) and its influence may also be seen in Goethe's early work Die Leiden des jungen Werthers (1774), a high-point of Sturm und Drang. Meta Klopstock's writing has also been seen as part of the movement.

=== Results ===
Religious sentimentalism has often been considered as inspiration for François-René de Chateaubriand and his creation of Romanticism, which was another literary genre that emerged late in the eighteenth century. In popular literature, Empfindsamkeit was a common genre that continued into the nineteenth century, and was found in serialised novels in periodicals such as Gartenlaube. In a theatre sense, Empfindsamkeit was succeeded by rührstück or melodrama.

== See also ==
- Francis Hutcheson, Essay on the Nature and Conduct of the Passions and Affections and Illustrations upon the Moral Sense.
- Sentiment (disambiguation)
- Sentimental poetry

== Notes ==
- Sterne, Laurence. A Sentimental Journey. New York :Oxford University Press, 2003.
