= Sentimentalism =

Sentimentalism may refer to:

- Sentimentalism (philosophy), a theory in moral epistemology concerning how one knows moral truths; also known as moral sense theory
- Sentimentalism (literature), a form of literary discourse

== See also ==
- Sentimentality
