= Moderate objectivism =

Moderate objectivism is a concept of moral principles based on the ethics of Sir William David Ross (1877–1940). Moderate objectivism adheres to basic notions of the natural law theory. W. D. Ross refers to these moderate objectivists' accounts of moral principles as "prima facie principles" which are valid rules of action that one should generally adhere to but, in cases of moral conflict, may be overridable by another moral principle, and hence the idea of moderation.
