= Cambridge Dictionary (disambiguation) =

The Cambridge Dictionary is a common short name for the Cambridge Advanced Learner's Dictionary, published by Cambridge University Press (CUP).

It may also refer to these dictionaries also published by CUP:

- The Cambridge Dictionary of Philosophy
- English Pronouncing Dictionary, acquired by CUP and renamed Cambridge English Pronouncing Dictionary
