= The Right and the Good =

1930 book by W. D. Ross

- Author: W. D. Ross
- Language: English
- Subject: Ethics
- Published: 1930
- Publication place: United Kingdom
- Media type: Print

The Right and the Good is a 1930 book by the Scottish philosopher William David Ross. In it, Ross develops a deontological pluralism based on prima facie duties. Ross defends a realist position about morality and an intuitionist position about moral knowledge. The Right and the Good has been praised as one of the most important works of ethical theory in the twentieth century.

== Summary ==
As the title suggests, The Right and the Good is about rightness, goodness and their relation to each other. Rightness is a property of acts while goodness concerns various kinds of things. According to Ross, there are certain features that both have in common: they are real properties, they are indefinable, pluralistic and knowable through intuition. Central to rightness are prima facie duties, for example, the duty to keep one's promises or to refrain from harming others. Of special interest for understanding goodness is intrinsic value: what is good in itself. Ross ascribes intrinsic value to pleasure, knowledge, virtue and justice. It is easy to confuse rightness and goodness in the case of moral goodness. An act is right if it conforms to the agent's absolute duty. Doing the act for the appropriate motive is not important for rightness but it is central for moral goodness or virtue. Ross uses these considerations to point out the flaws in other ethical theories, for example, in G. E. Moore's ideal utilitarianism or in Immanuel Kant's deontology.

=== Realism and indefinability ===
Ross defends a realist position about morality: the moral order expressed in prima facie duties is just as real as "the spatial or numerical structure expressed in the axioms of geometry or arithmetic". Furthermore, the terms "right" and "good" are indefinable. This means that various naturalistic theories trying to define "good" in terms of desire or "right" in terms of producing the most pleasure fail. But this even extends to theories that characterise one of these terms through the other. Ross uses this line of thought to object to Moore's ideal utilitarianism, which defines "right" in terms of "good" by holding that an action is right if it produces the best possible outcome.

=== The Right ===
Ross, like Immanuel Kant, is a deontologist: he holds that rightness depends on adherence to duties, not on consequences. But against Kant's monism, which bases ethics in only one foundational principle, the categorical imperative, Ross contends that there is a plurality of prima facie duties determining what is right. Some duties originate from our own previous actions, like the duty of fidelity (to keep promises and to tell the truth), and the duty of reparation (to make amends for wrongful acts). The duty of gratitude (to return kindnesses received) arises from the actions of others. Other duties include the duty of non-injury (not to hurt others), the duty of beneficence (to promote the maximum of aggregate good), the duty of self-improvement (to improve one's own condition) and the duty of justice (to distribute benefits and burdens equably).

One problem the deontological pluralist has to face is that cases can arise where the demands of one duty violate another duty, so-called moral dilemmas. For example, there are cases where it is necessary to break a promise in order to relieve someone's distress. Ross makes use of the distinction between prima facie duties and absolute duty to solve this problem. The duties listed above are prima facie duties; they are general principles whose validity is self-evident to morally mature persons. They are factors that do not take all considerations into account. Absolute duty, on the other hand, is particular to one specific situation, taking everything into account, and has to be judged on a case-by-case basis. Various considerations are involved in such judgments, e.g. concerning which prima facie duties would be upheld or violated and how important they are in the given case. Ross uses the comparison to physics, where various forces, e.g. due to gravitation or electromagnetism, affect the movement of bodies, but the overall movement is determined not by one single force component but by the total net force. It is absolute duty that determines which acts are right or wrong. This way, the dilemmas posed by prima facie duties can be resolved.

=== The Good ===
The term "good" is used in various senses in natural language. Ross points out that it is important for philosophy to distinguish between the attributive and the predicative sense. In the attributive sense, "good" means skillful or useful, as in "a good singer" or "a good knife". This sense of good is relative to a certain kind: being good as something, like a person may be good as a singer but not good as a cook. The predicative sense of good, on the other hand, as in "pleasure is good" or "knowledge is good" is not relative in this sense. Of main interest to philosophy is a certain type of predicative goodness: so-called intrinsic goodness. An intrinsically good thing is good in itself: it would be good even if it existed all by itself, it is not just good as a means because of its consequences.

According to Ross, self-evident intuition shows that there are four kinds of things that are intrinsically good: pleasure, knowledge, virtue and justice. "Virtue" refers to actions or dispositions to act from the appropriate motives, for example, from the desire to do one's duty. "Justice", on the other hand, is about happiness in proportion to merit. As such, pleasure, knowledge and virtue all concern states of mind, in contrast to justice, which concerns a relation between two states of mind. These values come in degrees and are comparable with each other. Ross holds that virtue has the highest value while pleasure has the lowest value. He goes so far as to suggest that "no amount of pleasure is equal to any amount of virtue, that in fact virtue belongs to a higher order of value". Values can also be compared within each category, for example, well-grounded knowledge of general principles is more valuable than weakly grounded knowledge of isolated matters of fact.

=== Intuitionism ===
According to Ross's intuitionism, we can know moral truths through intuition, for example, that it is wrong to lie or that knowledge is intrinsically good. Intuitions involve a direct apprehension that is not mediated by inferences or deductions: they are self-evident and therefore not in need of any additional proof. This ability is not inborn but has to be developed on the way to reaching mental maturity. But in its fully developed form, we can know moral truths just as well as we can know mathematical truths like the axioms of geometry or arithmetic. This self-evident knowledge is limited to general principles: we can come to know the prima facie duties this way but not our absolute duty in a particular situation: what we should do all things considered. All we can do is consult perception to determine which prima facie duty has the highest normative weight in this particular case, even though this usually does not amount to knowledge proper due to the complexity involved in most specific cases.

=== Objections to other theories ===
Various arguments in The Right and the Good are directed against utilitarianism in general and Moore's version of it in particular. Ross acknowledges that there is a duty to promote the maximum of aggregate good, as utilitarianism demands. But, Ross contends, this is just one besides various other duties, which are ignored by the overly simplistic and reductive utilitarian outlook. Another fault of utilitarianism is that it disregards the personal character of duties, for example, due to fidelity and gratitude. Ross argues that his deontological pluralism does a better job at capturing common-sense morality since it avoids these problems.

Ross objects to Kant's view that the rightness of actions depends on their motive. Such a view leads to a circular or even contradictory account of duty since "[t]hose who hold that our duty is to act from a certain motive usually ... hold that the motive from which we ought to act is the sense of duty". So "it is my duty to do act A from the sense that it is my duty to do act A". To avoid this problem, Ross suggests that moral goodness should be distinguished from moral rightness or moral obligation. The moral value of an action depends on the motive but the motive is not relevant for whether the act is right or wrong.

== Criticism ==
Ross's intuitionism relies on our intuitions about what is right and what has intrinsic value as the source of moral knowledge. But it is questionable how reliable moral intuitions are. One worry is due to the fact that there is a lot of disagreement about fundamental moral principles. Another doubt comes from an evolutionary perspective which holds that our moral intuitions are primarily shaped by evolutionary pressures and less by the objective moral structure of the world.

Utilitarians have defended their position against the accusations of being overly simplistic and out of touch with common-sense morality by pointing to flaws in Ross's arguments. Many examples by Ross in favor of deontological pluralism seem to rely on a rather generic characterisation of the cases. But filling in the particular details may show utilitarianism to be more in touch with common-sense than initially suggested.

Another criticism concerns Ross's term "prima facie duty". As Shelly Kagan has pointed out, this term is unfortunate since it implies a mere appearance as, for example, when someone is under the illusion of having a certain duty. But what Ross tries to convey is that every prima facie duty has actual normative weight even though it may be overruled by other considerations. This would be better expressed by the term "pro tanto duty".

== Influence ==
Ross's deontological pluralism provided an innovative alternative to Kantian deontology. His ethical intuitionism found few followers among his contemporaries but has seen a revival by the end of the 20th and the beginning of the 21st century. Among the philosophers influenced by The Right and the Good are Philip Stratton-Lake, Robert Audi, Michael Huemer, and C. D. Broad.

== See also ==
- Value pluralism – Idea in ethics; many principles are true at the same time
