= Imperative =

Imperative may refer to:

- Imperative mood, a grammatical mood (or mode) expressing commands, direct requests, and prohibitions
- Imperative programming, a programming paradigm in computer science
- Imperative logic
- Imperative (film), a 1982 German drama film

== In philosophy ==
- Moral imperative, a philosophical concept relating to obligation
- Categorical imperative, central philosophical concept in the moral philosophy of Immanuel Kant
- Hypothetical imperative, introduced by Immanuel Kant as a commandment of reason that applies only conditionally
