= Value trumping =

Value trumping is the "precedence of certain cultural values over others" in certain contexts, whereas the same value may not trump other values under different circumstances. The term is usually applied to cultural or group values, where the members adapt to specific circumstances.

== See also ==
- Value pluralism
