= Moral rationalism =

View that moral principles are knowable a priori, by reason alone

Moral rationalism, also called ethical rationalism, is a view in meta-ethics (specifically the epistemology of ethics) according to which moral principles are knowable a priori, by reason alone. Some prominent figures in the history of philosophy who have defended moral rationalism are Plato and Immanuel Kant. Perhaps the most prominent figure in the history of philosophy who has rejected moral rationalism is David Hume. Recent philosophers who have defended moral rationalism include Richard Hare, Christine Korsgaard, Alan Gewirth, and Michael Smith.

Moral rationalism is similar to the rationalist version of ethical intuitionism; however, they are distinct views. Moral rationalism is neutral on whether basic moral beliefs are known via inference or not. A moral rationalist who believes that some moral beliefs are justified non-inferentially is a rationalist ethical intuitionist. So, rationalist ethical intuitionism implies moral rationalism, but the reverse does not hold.

== Emotions and reason ==
There are two main forms of moral rationalism, associated with two major forms of reasoning. If moral reasoning is based on theoretical reason, and is hence analogous to discovering empirical or scientific truths about the world, a purely emotionless being could arrive at the truths of reason. Such a being wouldn't necessarily be motivated to act morally. Beings who aren't motivated to act morally can also arrive at moral truths, but needn't rely upon their emotions to do so.

Many moral rationalists believe that moral reasoning is based on practical reason, which involves choices about what to do or intend to do, including how to achieve one's goals and what goals one should have in the first place. In this view, moral reasoning always involves emotional states and hence is intrinsically motivating. Immanuel Kant expressed this view when he said that immoral actions do not involve a contradiction in belief, but a contradiction in the will, that is, in one's commitment to a principle which one intends to motivate actions. Christine Korsgaard's elaboration of Kantian reasoning tries to show that if ethics is actually based on practical reasoning, this shows that it can be objective and universal, without having to appeal to questionable metaphysical assumptions.

== Criticisms ==
Moral sense theorists (or sentimentalists), such as David Hume, are the key opponents of moral rationalism. In Book 3 of A Treatise of Human Nature and in An Enquiry Concerning the Principles of Morals (EPM), Hume argues (among other things) that reason and emotions (or the "passions" as he often calls them) are quite distinct faculties and that the foundations of morality lie in sentiment, not reason. Hume takes it as a fact about human psychology and morality that moral judgments have an essentially emotional, sentimental, or otherwise non-rational or cognitive character to them. According to Hume, "...morality is determined by sentiment. It defines virtue to be whatever mental action or quality gives to a spectator the pleasing sentiment of approbation; and vice the contrary" (EPM, Appendix 1, ¶10).
