= Sentiment =

Sentiment may refer to:

- Feelings, and emotions
- Public opinion, also called sentiment
- Sentimentality, an appeal to shallow, uncomplicated emotions at the expense of reason
- Sentimental novel, an 18th-century literary genre
- Market sentiment, optimism or pessimism in financial and commodity markets
- Sentiment analysis, automatic detection of opinions embodied in text
- News sentiment, automatic detection of opinions embodied in news
- Sentiment (film), a 2003 Czech drama film
- Sentiment (Claire Rousay album), 2024
- Sentiment (Said the Sky album), 2022
- Sentiments (album), Sahib Sahib
