= On a Supposed Right to Tell Lies from Benevolent Motives =

1797 essay by Immanuel Kant

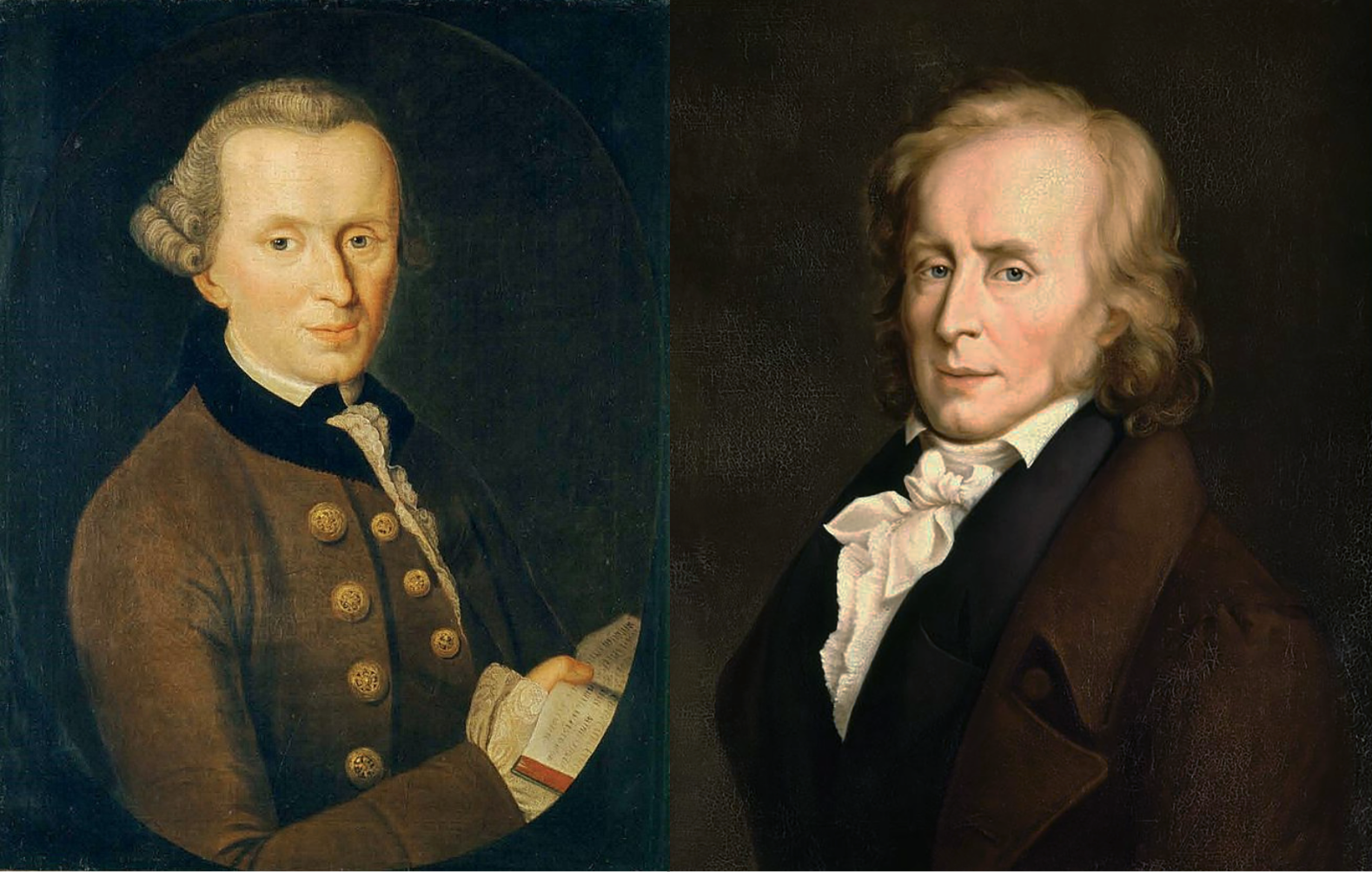
Images of Kant and Constant

"On a Supposed Right to Tell Lies from Benevolent Motives" (German: Über ein vermeintes Recht aus Menschenliebe zu lügen; sometimes translated "On a Supposed Right to Lie because of Philanthropic Concerns") is a 1797 essay by the philosopher Immanuel Kant in which the author discusses radical honesty.

== Content ==
In this essay, arguing against the position of Benjamin Constant, Des réactions politiques, Kant states that:

Hence a lie defined merely as an intentionally untruthful declaration to another man does not require the additional condition that it must do harm to another, as jurists require in their definition (mendacium est falsiloquium in praeiudicium alterius). For a lie always harms another; if not some human being, then it nevertheless does harm to humanity in general, inasmuch as it vitiates the very source of right [rechtsquelle]... All practical principles of right must contain rigorous truth... This is because such exceptions would destroy the universality on account of which alone they bear the name of principles.

== Reception ==
The Kant scholar Allen W. Wood characterizes the essay as "famous (or infamous)". Helga Varden has written, "Kant's example of lying to the murderer at the door has been a cherished source of scorn for thinkers with little sympathy for Kant's philosophy and a source of deep puzzlement for those more favorably inclined... After World War II our spontaneous, negative reaction to this apparently absurd line of argument is made even starker by replacing the murderer at the door with a Nazi officer looking for Jews hidden in people's homes. Does Kant really mean to say that people hiding Jews in their homes should have told the truth to the Nazis, and that if they did lie, they became co-responsible for the heinous acts committed against those Jews who, like Anne Frank, were caught anyway?" Varden argues that Kant's views have been misrepresented by subsequent thinkers and that Kant's justification for lying being wrong is not that the person who is lied to is wronged, as is commonly argued. The first monograph on Kant's essay was published by Jens Timmermann.

== See also ==
- Categorical imperative
- Groundwork of the Metaphysic of Morals
