= The Cambridge Dictionary of Philosophy =

1995 book edited by Robert Audi

- Cover of the first edition
- Editor: Robert Audi
- Language: English
- Subject: Philosophy
- Publisher: Cambridge University Press
- Publication date: 1995
- Publication place: United Kingdom
- Media type: Print (Hardcover and Paperback)
- Pages: 1001 (second edition)
- ISBN: 0-521-63722-8 (second edition)

The Cambridge Dictionary of Philosophy (1995; second edition 1999; third edition 2015) is a dictionary of philosophy published by Cambridge University Press and edited by the philosopher Robert Audi. There are 28 members on the Board of Editorial Advisors and 440 contributors.

== Publication history ==
The Cambridge Dictionary of Philosophy was first published in 1995 by Cambridge University Press. A second edition followed in 1999, and a third edition in 2015.

== See also ==
- Cambridge University Dictionaries
