= Sentimental poetry =

Sentimental poetry is a melodramatic poetic form. It is aimed primarily at stimulating the emotions rather than at communicating experience truthfully. Bereavement is a common theme of sentimental poetry.

Friedrich Schiller discussed sentimental poetry in his influential essay, On Naïve and Sentimental Poetry.

Isaac Pray described a sentimental poet as "He who plays off the amiable in verse, and writes to display his own fine feelings".

Richard Tickell is a self-proclaimed sentimental poet. His work The wreath of fashion, or, the art of sentimental poetry. By the Author of Anticipation refers to the genre of poetry in the title. The Preface speaks to author’s recent studies of the Sentimental Style and refers to other Sentimental works he had read (without titles) with themes of bereavement.

Romantic poetry is rooted in and springs from sentimental. Charlotte Turner Smith is the first poet in England to be called romantic. Her poetry illustrates the common ground of sentimental and romantic as well as their differential qualities.

Sara Teasdale was praised for her lyrical mastery and romantic subjects. During World War I she wrote several poems regarding sentiments of the war but never published them. When she shared one poem with critic Louis Untermeyer and poet John Meyers O'Hara, they cautioned her against publishing it. But she did publish "Union Square", although she did not publicly share the sentiments she wrote of.

Sentimental poetry was parodied by Mark Twain in The Adventures of Huckleberry Finn.

== See also ==
- Sentimental novel
- Sentimentalism
- Sentimentality
