= Michael S. Moore (academic) =

- Occupation: Law professor
- Title: Chair Charles R. Walgreen

Academic work
- Discipline: Constitutional Law, Criminal Law, and Jurisprudence
- Institutions: University of Illinois

Michael S. Moore is an American lawyer, focusing on constitutional law, criminal law, and jurisprudence. He is currently the Charles R. Walgreen Chair at University of Illinois.

== Life and career ==
Moore graduated from South Eugene High School, in Eugene, Oregon, in 1961. He earned his A.B. in Political Science from the University of Oregon, earned a J.D. from Harvard Law School in 1967, and earned an S.J.D. from Harvard University in 1978.

Before his current academic position, Moore was formerly the Leon Meltzer Professor of Law and Professor of Philosophy at the University of Pennsylvania Law School (1989-2000), Robert Kingsley Chair at University of Southern California, Warren Distinguished Professor of Law at University of San Diego, William Minor Lile Distinguished Visiting Professor of Law at University of Virginia, Mason Ladd Distinguished Visiting Professor at University of Iowa, and the Florence Ragatz Visiting Professorship at Yale Law School.
