= Categorical imperative =

Central concept in Kantian moral philosophy

The categorical imperative (German: Kategorischer Imperativ) is the central philosophical concept in the deontological moral philosophy of Immanuel Kant. Introduced in Kant's 1785 Groundwork of the Metaphysics of Morals, it is a way of evaluating motivations for action. It is best known in its original formulation: "Act only according to that maxim whereby you can at the same time will that it should become a universal law."

According to Kant, rational beings occupy a special place in creation, and morality can be summed up in an imperative, or ultimate commandment of reason, from which all duties and obligations derive. He defines an imperative as any proposition declaring a certain action (or inaction) to be necessary. Hypothetical imperatives apply to someone who wishes to attain certain ends. For example, "I must drink something to quench my thirst" or "I must study to pass this exam." The categorical imperative, on the other hand, commands immediately the maxims one conceives which match its categorical requirements, denoting an absolute, unconditional requirement that must be obeyed in all circumstances and is justified as an end in itself, possessing intrinsic value beyond simply being desirable.

Kant expressed his strong dissatisfaction with the popular moral philosophy of his day, believing that it could never surpass the merely conditional command of hypothetical imperatives: a utilitarian says that murder is wrong because it does not maximize good for those involved, but this is irrelevant to people who are concerned only with maximizing the positive outcome for themselves. Consequently, Kant argued, hypothetical moral systems cannot determine moral action or be regarded as bases for legitimate moral judgments against others, because the imperatives on which they are based rely too heavily on subjective considerations. He presented a deontological moral system, based on the demands of the categorical imperative, as an alternative.

== Outline ==
=== Pure practical reason ===
The capacity that underlies deciding what is moral is called pure practical reason, which is contrasted with: pure reason, which is the capacity to know without having been shown; and mere practical reason, by which we determine ourselves to practical action within the phenomenal world.

Hypothetical imperatives tell us which means best achieve our ends. They do not, however, tell us which ends we should choose. The typical dichotomy in choosing ends is between ends that are right (e.g., helping someone) and those that are good (e.g., enriching oneself). Kant considered the right prior to the good; to him, the latter was morally dependent on the former. In Kant's view, a person cannot decide whether conduct is right, or moral, through empirical means. Such judgments must be reached a priori, using pure practical reason independently of the influence of felt motives, or inclinations.

What dictates which action can be genuinely considered moral are maxims willed to action from the categorical imperative, separate from observable experience. This distinction, that it is imperative that each action is not empirically determined by observable experience, has had wide social impact in the legal and political concepts of human rights and equality.

=== Possibility ===
Rational persons regard themselves as belonging to both the world of understanding and the world of sense. As a member of the world of understanding, a person's actions would always conform to the autonomy of the will. As a part of the world of sense, he would necessarily fall under the natural law of desires and inclinations. However, since the world of understanding contains the ground of the world of sense, and thus of its laws, his actions ought to conform to the autonomy of the will, and this categorical "ought" represents a synthetic proposition a priori.

=== Freedom and autonomy ===
Kant viewed the human individual as a rationally self-conscious being with "impure" freedom of choice:

The faculty of desire in accordance with concepts, in-so-far as the ground determining it to action lies within itself and not in its object, is called a faculty to "do or to refrain from doing as one pleases". Insofar as it is joined with one's consciousness of the ability to bring about its object by one's action it is called choice (Willkür); if it is not joined with this consciousness its act is called a wish. The faculty of desire whose inner determining ground, hence even what pleases it, lies within the subject's reason is called the will (Wille). The will is therefore the faculty of desire considered not so much in relation to action (as choice is) but rather in relation to the ground determining choice in action. The will itself, strictly speaking, has no determining ground; insofar as it can determine choice, it is instead practical reason itself. Insofar as reason can determine the faculty of desire as such, not only choice but also mere wish can be included under the will. That choice which can be determined by pure reason is called free choice. That which can be determined only by inclination (sensible impulse, stimulus) would be animal choice (arbitrium brutum). Human choice, however, is a choice that can indeed be affected but not determined by impulses, and is therefore of itself (apart from an acquired proficiency of reason) not pure but can still be determined to actions by pure will.

— Immanuel Kant, Metaphysics of Morals 6:213–4

For a will to be considered free, we must understand it as capable of affecting causal power without being caused to do so. However, the idea of lawless free will, meaning a will acting without any causal structure, is incomprehensible. Therefore, a free will must be acting under laws that it gives to itself.

Although Kant conceded that there could be no conceivable example of free will, because any example would only show us a will as it appears to us—as a subject of natural laws—he nevertheless argued against determinism. He proposed that determinism is logically inconsistent: the determinist claims that because A caused B, and B caused C, that A is the true cause of C. Applied to a case of the human will, a determinist would argue that the will does not have causal power and that something outside the will causes the will to act as it does. But this argument merely assumes what it sets out to prove: viz. that the human will is part of the causal chain.

Secondly, Kant remarks that free will is inherently unknowable. Since even a free person could not possibly have knowledge of their own freedom, we cannot use our failure to find a proof for freedom as evidence for a lack of it. The observable world could never contain an example of freedom because it would never show us a will as it appears to itself, but only a will that is subject to natural laws imposed on it. But we do appear to ourselves as free. Therefore, he argued for the idea of transcendental freedom—that is, freedom as a presupposition of the question "what ought I to do?" This is what gives us sufficient basis for ascribing moral responsibility: the rational and self-actualizing power of a person, which he calls moral autonomy: "the property the will has of being a law unto itself."

== First formulation: Universality and the law of nature ==
Act only according to that maxim whereby you can at the same time will that it should become a universal law.

— Immanuel Kant, Groundwork of the Metaphysics of Morals

Kant concludes that a moral proposition that is true must be one that is not tied to any particular conditions, including the identity and desires of the person making the moral deliberation.

A moral maxim must imply absolute necessity, which is to say that it must be disconnected from the particular physical details surrounding the proposition, and could be applied to any rational being. This leads to the first formulation of the categorical imperative, sometimes called the principle of universalizability: "Act only according to that maxim whereby you can at the same time will that it should become a universal law."

Closely connected with this formulation is the law of nature formulation. Because laws of nature are by definition universal, Kant claims we may also express the categorical imperative as:

Act as if the maxims of your action were to become through your will a universal law of nature.

Kant divides the duties imposed by this formulation into two sets of two subsets. The first division is between duties that we have to ourselves versus those we have to others. For example, we have an obligation not to kill ourselves as well as an obligation not to kill others. Kant also, however, introduces a distinction between perfect and imperfect duties.

=== Perfect duty ===
According to Kant's reasoning, we first have a perfect duty not to act by maxims that result in logical contradictions when we attempt to universalize them. The moral proposition A: "It is permissible to steal" would result in a contradiction upon universalisation. The notion of stealing presupposes the existence of personal property, but were A universalized, then there could be no personal property, and so the proposition has logically negated itself.

In general, perfect duties are those that are blameworthy if not met, as they are a basic required duty for a human being.

=== Imperfect duty ===
Second, we have imperfect duties, which are still based on pure reason, but which allow for desires in how they are carried out in practice. Because these depend somewhat on the subjective preferences of humankind, this duty is not as strong as a perfect duty, but it is still morally binding. As such, unlike perfect duties, you do not attract blame should you not complete an imperfect duty but you shall receive praise for it should you complete it, as you have gone beyond the basic duties and taken duty upon yourself. Imperfect duties are circumstantial, meaning simply that you could not reasonably exist in a constant state of performing that duty. This is what truly differentiates between perfect and imperfect duties, because imperfect duties are those duties that are never truly completed. A particular example provided by Kant is the imperfect duty to cultivate one's own talents.

== Second formulation: Humanity ==
Act in such a way that you treat humanity, whether in your own person or in the person of any other, never merely as a means to an end, but always at the same time as an end.

— Immanuel Kant, Groundwork of the Metaphysics of Morals

Every rational action must set before itself not only a principle, but also an end. Most ends are of a subjective kind, because they need only be pursued if they are in line with some particular hypothetical imperative that a person may choose to adopt. For an end to be objective, it would be necessary that we categorically pursue it.

The free will is the source of all rational action. But to treat it as a subjective end is to deny the possibility of freedom in general. Because the autonomous will is the one and only source of moral action, it would contradict the first formulation to claim that a person is merely a means to some other end, rather than always an end in themselves.

On this basis, Kant derives the second formulation of the categorical imperative from the first.

By combining this formulation with the first, we learn that a person has perfect duty not to use the humanity of themselves or others merely as a means to some other end. As a slave owner would be effectively asserting a moral right to own a person as a slave, they would be asserting a property right in another person. This would violate the categorical imperative, because it denies the basis for there to be free rational action at all; it denies the status of a person as an end in themselves. One cannot, on Kant's account, ever suppose a right to treat another person as a mere means to an end. In the case of a slave owner, the slaves are being used to cultivate the owner's fields (the slaves acting as the means) to ensure a sufficient harvest (the end goal of the owner).

The second formulation also leads to the imperfect duty to further the ends of ourselves and others. If any person desires perfection in themselves or others, it would be their moral duty to seek that end for all people equally, so long as that end does not contradict perfect duty.

== Third formulation: Autonomy ==
Thus the third practical principle follows [from the first two] as the ultimate condition of their harmony with practical reason: the idea of the will of every rational being as a universally legislating will.

— Immanuel Kant, Groundwork of the Metaphysics of Morals

Kant claims that the first formulation lays out the objective conditions on the categorical imperative: that it be universal in form and thus capable of becoming a law of nature. Likewise, the second formulation lays out subjective conditions: that there be certain ends in themselves, namely rational beings as such. The result of these two considerations is that we must will maxims that can be at the same time universal, but which do not infringe on the freedom of ourselves nor of others. A universal maxim, however, could only have this form if it were a maxim that each subject by himself endorsed. Because it cannot be something which externally constrains each subject's activity, it must be a constraint that each subject has set for himself. This leads to the concept of self-legislation. Each subject must through his own use of reason will maxims which have the form of universality, but do not impinge on the freedom of others: thus each subject must will maxims that could be universally self-legislated.

The result, of course, is a formulation of the categorical imperative that contains much of the same as the first two. We must will something that we could at the same time freely will of ourselves. After introducing this third formulation, Kant introduces a distinction between autonomy (literally: self-law-giving) and heteronomy (literally: other-law-giving). This third formulation makes it clear that the categorical imperative requires autonomy. It is not enough that the right conduct be followed, but that one also demands that conduct of oneself.

== Fourth formulation: The Kingdom of Ends ==
Act according to maxims of a universally legislating member of a merely possible kingdom of ends.

— Immanuel Kant, Groundwork of the Metaphysics of Morals

In the Groundwork, Kant goes on to formulate the categorical imperative in a number of ways following the first three; however, because Kant himself claims that there are only three principles, little attention has been given to these other formulations. Moreover, they are often easily assimilated to the first three formulations, as Kant takes himself to be explicitly summarizing these earlier principles.

There is, however, another formulation that has received additional attention as it appears to introduce a social dimension into Kant's thought. This is the formulation of the "Kingdom of Ends."

Because a truly autonomous will would not be subjugated to any interest, it would only be subject to those laws it makes for itself—but it must also regard those laws as if they would be bound to others, or they would not be universalizable, and hence they would not be laws of conduct at all. Thus, Kant presents the notion of the hypothetical Kingdom of Ends of which he suggests all people should consider themselves never solely as means but always as ends.

We ought to act only by maxims that would harmonize with a possible kingdom of ends. We have perfect duty not to act by maxims that create incoherent or impossible states of natural affairs when we attempt to universalize them, and we have imperfect duty not to act by maxims that lead to unstable or greatly undesirable states of affairs.

== Application ==
Although Kant was intensely critical of the use of examples as moral yardsticks, as they tend to rely on our moral intuitions (feelings) rather than our rational powers, this section explores some applications of the categorical imperative for illustrative purposes.

=== Deception ===
Kant asserted that lying, or deception of any kind, would be forbidden under any interpretation and in any circumstance. In Groundwork, Kant gives the example of a person who seeks to borrow money without intending to pay it back. This is a contradiction because if it were a universal action, no person would lend money anymore as he knows that he will never be paid back. The maxim of this action, says Kant, results in a contradiction in conceivability (and thus contradicts perfect duty). With lying, it would logically contradict the reliability of language. If it were universally acceptable to lie, then no one would believe anyone and all truths would be assumed to be lies. In each case, the proposed action becomes inconceivable in a world where the maxim exists as law. In a world where no one would lend money, seeking to borrow money in the manner originally imagined is inconceivable. In a world where no one trusts one another, the same is true about manipulative lies.

The right to deceive could also not be claimed because it would deny the status of the person deceived as an end in itself. The theft would be incompatible with a possible kingdom of ends. Therefore, Kant denied the right to lie or deceive for any reason, regardless of context or anticipated consequences.

=== Theft ===
Kant argued that any action taken against another person to which he or she could not possibly consent is a violation of perfect duty as interpreted through the second formulation. If a thief were to steal a book from an unknowing victim, it may have been that the victim would have agreed, had the thief simply asked. However, no person can consent to theft, because the presence of consent would mean that the transfer was not a theft. Because the victim could not have consented to the action, it could not be instituted as a universal law of nature, and theft contradicts perfect duty.

=== Suicide ===
In the Groundwork of the Metaphysics of Morals, Kant applies his categorical imperative to the issue of suicide motivated by a sickness of life:

A man reduced to despair by a series of misfortunes feels sick of life, but is still so far in possession of his reason that he can ask himself whether taking his own life would not be contrary to his duty to himself. Now he asks whether the maxim of his action could become a universal law of nature. But his maxim is this: from self-love I make as my principle to shorten my life when its continued duration threatens more evil than it promises satisfaction. There only remains the question as to whether this principle of self-love can become a universal law of nature. One sees at once a contradiction in a system of nature whose law would destroy life by means of the very same feeling that acts so as to stimulate the furtherance of life, and hence there could be no existence as a system of nature. Therefore, such a maxim cannot possibly hold as a universal law of nature and is, consequently, wholly opposed to the supreme principle of all duty.

How the Categorical Imperative would apply to suicide from other motivations is unclear.

=== Laziness ===
Kant also applies the categorical imperative in the Groundwork of the Metaphysics of Morals on the subject of "failing to cultivate one's talents." He proposes a man who if he cultivated his talents could bring many goods, but he has everything he wants and would prefer to enjoy the pleasures of life instead. The man asks himself how the universality of such a thing works. While Kant agrees that a society could subsist if everyone did nothing, he notes that the man would have no pleasures to enjoy, for if everyone let their talents go to waste, there would be no one to create luxuries that created this theoretical situation in the first place. Not only that, but cultivating one's talents is a duty to oneself. Thus, it is not willed to make laziness universal, and a rational being has imperfect duty to cultivate its talents. Kant concludes in the Groundwork:

[H]e cannot possibly will that this should become a universal law of nature or be implanted in us as such a law by a natural instinct. For as a rational being he necessarily wills that all his faculties should be developed, inasmuch as they are given him for all sorts of possible purposes.

=== Charity ===
Kant's last application of the categorical imperative in the Groundwork of the Metaphysics of Morals is of charity. He proposes a fourth man who finds his own life fine but sees other people struggling with life and who ponders the outcome of doing nothing to help those in need (while not envying them or accepting anything from them). While Kant admits that humanity could subsist (and admits it could possibly perform better) if this were universal, he states:

But even though it is possible that a universal law of nature could subsist in accordance with that maxim, still it is impossible to will that such a principle should hold everywhere as a law of nature. For a will that resolved in this way would contradict itself, inasmuch as cases might often arise in which one would have need of the love and sympathy of others and in which he would deprive himself, by such a law of nature springing from his own will, of all hope of the aid he wants for himself.

=== Cruelty to animals ===
Kant derived a prohibition against cruelty to animals by arguing that such cruelty is a violation of a duty in relation to oneself. According to Kant, man has the imperfect duty to strengthen the feeling of compassion, since this feeling promotes morality in relation to other human beings. However, cruelty to animals deadens the feeling of compassion in man. Therefore, man is obliged not to treat animals brutally.

=== Application of the universalizability principle to the ethics of consumption ===
Pope Francis, in his 2015 encyclical, applies the first formulation of the universalizability principle to the issue of consumption:

Instead of resolving the problems of the poor and thinking of how the world can be different, some can only propose a reduction in the birth rate. ... To blame population growth instead of extreme and selective consumerism on the part of some, is one way of refusing to face the issues. It is an attempt to legitimize the present model of distribution, where a minority believes that it has the right to consume in a way which can never be universalized, since the planet could not even contain the waste products of such consumption.

=== Game theory ===
One form of the categorical imperative is superrationality. The concept was elucidated by Douglas Hofstadter as a new approach to game theory. Unlike in conventional game theory, a superrational player will act as if all other players are superrational too and that a superrational agent will always come up with the same strategy as any other superrational agent when facing the same problem.

== Criticisms ==
=== The Golden Rule ===
The first formulation of the categorical imperative appears similar to the Golden Rule. In its negative form, the rule prescribes: "Do not impose on others what you do not wish for yourself." In its positive form, the rule states: "Treat others how you wish to be treated." Due to this similarity, some have thought the two are identical. William P. Alston and Richard B. Brandt, in their introduction to Kant, stated, "His view about when an action is right is rather similar to the Golden Rule; he says, roughly, that an act is right if and only if its agent is prepared to have that kind of action made universal practice or a 'law of nature.' Thus, for instance, Kant says it is right for a person to lie if and only if he is prepared to have everyone lie in similar circumstances, including those in which he is deceived by the lie."

Kant himself did not think so in the Groundwork of the Metaphysics of Morals. Rather, the categorical imperative is an attempt to identify a purely formal and necessarily universally binding rule on all rational agents. The Golden Rule, on the other hand, is neither purely formal nor necessarily universally binding. It is "empirical" in the sense that applying it depends on providing content, such as, "If you don't want others to hit you, then don't hit them." It is also a hypothetical imperative in the sense that it can be formulated, "If you want X done to you, then do X to others." Kant feared that the hypothetical clause, "if you want X done to you," remains open to dispute. In fact, he famously criticized it for not being sensitive to differences of situation, noting that a prisoner duly convicted of a crime could appeal to the golden rule while asking the judge to release him, pointing out that the judge would not want anyone else to send him to prison, so he should not do so to others.

Claiming that Ken Binmore thought so as well, Peter Corning suggests that:

Kant's objection to the Golden Rule is especially suspect because the categorical imperative (CI) sounds a lot like a paraphrase, or perhaps a close cousin, of the same fundamental idea. In effect, it says that you should act toward others in ways that you would want everyone else to act toward others, yourself included (presumably). Calling it a universal law does not materially improve on the basic concept.

=== Lying to a murderer ===
One of the first major challenges to Kant's reasoning came from the French philosopher Benjamin Constant, who asserted that since truth telling must be universal, according to Kant's theories, one must (if asked) tell a known murderer the location of his prey. This challenge occurred while Kant was still alive, and his response was the essay On a Supposed Right to Tell Lies from Benevolent Motives (sometimes translated On a Supposed Right to Lie because of Philanthropic Concerns). In this reply, Kant agreed with Constant's inference, that from Kant's own premises one must infer a moral duty not to lie to a murderer.

Kant denied that such an inference indicates any weakness in his premises: not lying to the murderer is required because moral actions do not derive their worth from the expected consequences. He claimed that because lying to the murderer would treat him as a mere means to another end, the lie denies the rationality of another person, and therefore denies the possibility of there being free rational action at all. This lie results in a contradiction in conception (rather than the more practical one in will) and therefore the lie is in conflict with duty.

Constant and Kant agree that refusing to answer the murderer's question (rather than lying) is consistent with the categorical imperative, but assume for the purposes of argument that refusing to answer would not be an option.

=== Questioning autonomy ===
Schopenhauer's criticism of the Kantian philosophy expresses doubt concerning the absence of egoism in the categorical imperative. Schopenhauer claimed that the categorical imperative is actually hypothetical and egotistical, not categorical. However, Schopenhauer's criticism (as cited here) presents a weak case for linking egoism to Kant's formulations of the categorical imperative. By definition any form of sentient, organic life is interdependent and emergent with the organic and inorganic properties, environmental life supporting features, species dependent means of child rearing. These conditions are already rooted in mutual interdependence which makes that life form possible at all to be in a state of coordination with other forms of life – be it with pure practical reason or not. It may be that the categorical imperative is indeed biased in that it is life promoting and in part promotes the positive freedom for rational beings to pursue freely the setting of their own ends (read choices).

However, deontology also holds not merely the positive form freedom (to set ends freely) but also the negative forms of freedom to that same will (to restrict setting of ends that treat others merely as means, etc.). The deontological system is for Kant argued to be based in a synthetic a priori – since in restricting the will's motive at its root to a purely moral schema consistent its maxims can be held up to the pure moral law as a structure of cognition and therefore the alteration of action accompanying a cultured person to a 'reverence for the law' or 'moral feeling'.

Thus, insofar as individuals' freely chosen ends are consistent in a rational Idea of community of interdependent beings also exercising the possibility of their pure moral reason is the egoism self-justified as being what is 'holy' good will because the motive is consistent with what all rational beings who are able to exercise this purely formal reason would see. The full community of other rational members – even if this 'Kingdom of Ends' is not yet actualized and whether or not we ever live to see it – is thus a kind of 'infinite game' that seeks to held in view by all beings able to participate and choose the 'highest use of reason' (see Critique of Pure Reason) which is reason in its pure practical form. That is, morality seen deontologically.

Søren Kierkegaard believed Kantian autonomy was insufficient and that, if unchecked, people tend to be lenient in their own cases, either by not exercising the full rigor of the moral law or by not properly disciplining themselves of moral transgressions.

Kant was of the opinion that man is his own law (autonomy)—that is, he binds himself under the law which he himself gives himself. Actually, in a profounder sense, this is how lawlessness or experimentation are established. This is not being rigorously earnest any more than Sancho Panza's self-administered blows to his own bottom were vigorous. ... Now if a man is never even once willing in his lifetime to act so decisively that [a lawgiver] can get hold of him, well, then it happens, then the man is allowed to live on in self-complacent illusion and make-believe and experimentation, but this also means: utterly without grace.

— Søren Kierkegaard, Papers and Journals

However, many of Kierkegaard's criticisms on his understanding of Kantian autonomy, neglect the evolution of Kant's moral theory from the Groundwork of Metaphysics of Morals, to the second and final critiques respectively, The Critique of Practical Reason, The Critique of the Power of Judgment, and his final work on moral theory the Metaphysics of Morals.

== See also ==
- Deontological ethics
- Golden Rule
- Generalization (logic)
- Instrumental and value rationality
- Kantianism
- Normative ethics
