= Ethical intuitionism =

Family of views in moral epistemology

Ethical intuitionism (also called moral intuitionism) is a view or family of views in moral epistemology (and, on some definitions, metaphysics). It is foundationalism applied to moral knowledge, the thesis that some moral truths can be known non-inferentially (i.e., known without one needing to infer them from other truths one believes). Such an epistemological view is, by definition, committed to the existence of knowledge of moral truths; therefore, ethical intuitionism implies cognitivism.

As a foundationalist epistemological position, ethical intuitionism contrasts with coherentist positions in moral epistemology, such as those that depend on reflective equilibrium.

Despite the name "ethical intuitionism", ethical intuitionists need not (though often do) accept that intuitions of value (or of evaluative facts) form the foundation of ethical knowledge; the common commitment of ethical intuitionists is to a non-inferential foundation for ethical knowledge, regardless of whether such a non-inferential foundation consists in intuitions as such.

Throughout the philosophical literature, the term "ethical intuitionism" is frequently used with significant variation in its sense. This article's focus on foundationalism reflects the core commitments of contemporary self-identified ethical intuitionists.

Sufficiently broadly defined, ethical intuitionism can be taken to encompass cognitivist forms of moral sense theory. It is usually furthermore taken as essential to ethical intuitionism that there be self-evident or a priori moral knowledge; this counts against considering moral sense theory to be a species of intuitionism. (see the Rational intuition versus moral sense section of this article for further discussion).

== History ==
=== Early intuitionism ===
While there were ethical intuitionists in a broad sense at least as far back as Thomas Aquinas, the philosophical school usually labelled as ethical intuitionism developed in Britain in the 17th and 18th centuries. Early intuitionists like John Balguy, Ralph Cudworth, and Samuel Clarke were principally concerned with defending moral objectivism against the theories of Thomas Hobbes. Later, their views would be revived and developed by Richard Price and pitted against the moral sense theory of Francis Hutcheson, himself sometimes considered a sentimentalist intuitionist. Immanuel Kant's moral philosophy would be received in Britain as a German analog to Price, though according to R. M. Hare it is questionable whether Kant is an intuitionist.

=== Henry Sidgwick ===
In the 19th century, ethical intuitionism was considered by most British philosophers to be a philosophical rival of utilitarianism, until Henry Sidgwick showed there to be several logically distinct theories, both normative and epistemological, sharing the same label. For Sidgwick, intuitionism is about intuitive, i.e. non-inferential, knowledge of moral principles, which are self-evident to the knower. The criteria for this type of knowledge include that they are expressed in clear terms, that the different principles are mutually consistent with each other and that there is expert consensus on them. According to Sidgwick, commonsense moral principles fail to pass this test, but there are some more abstract principles that pass it, like that "what is right for me must be right for all persons in precisely similar circumstances" or that "one should be equally concerned with all temporal parts of one’s life". The most general principles arrived at this way are all compatible with utilitarianism, which is why Sidgwick sees a harmony between intuitionism and utilitarianism. There are also less general intuitive principles, like the duty to keep one's promises or to be just, but these principles are not universal and there are cases where different duties stand in conflict with each other. Sidgwick suggests that we resolve such conflicts in a utilitarian fashion by considering the consequences of the conflicting actions. Inspired by Sidgwick, 20th century philosopher C. D. Broad would coin the term "deontological ethics" to refer to the normative doctrines associated with intuitionism, leaving the phrase "ethical intuitionism" free to refer to the epistemological doctrines.

=== Intuitionism in analytic philosophy ===
Ethical intuitionism was popular in the early twentieth century, particularly among British analytic philosophers. H. A. Prichard gave a defense of the view in his "Does Moral Philosophy Rest on a Mistake?" (1912), wherein he contended that moral philosophy rested chiefly on the desire to provide arguments starting from non-normative premises for the principles of obligation that we pre-philosophically accept, such as the principle that one ought to keep one's promises or that one ought not to steal. This is a mistake, Prichard argued, both because it is impossible to derive any statement about what one ought to do from statements not concerning obligation (even statements about what is good), and because there is no need to do so since common sense principles of moral obligation are self-evident.

Prichard was influenced by G. E. Moore, whose Principia Ethica (1903) argued famously that goodness was an indefinable, non-natural property of which we had intuitive awareness. Moore originated the term "the naturalistic fallacy" to refer to the (alleged) error of confusing goodness with some natural property, and he deployed the Open Question Argument to show why this was an error. Unlike Prichard, Moore thought that one could derive principles of obligation from propositions about what is good.

W. D. Ross's intuitionism was influenced both by Prichard and Moore. He holds that we can know moral truths through intuition, for example, that it is wrong to lie or that knowledge is intrinsically good. Intuitions involve a direct apprehension that is not mediated by inferences or deductions: they are self-evident and therefore not in need of any additional proof. This ability is not inborn but has to be developed on the way to reaching mental maturity. But in its fully developed form, we can know moral truths just as well as we can know mathematical truths like the axioms of geometry or arithmetic. This self-evident knowledge is limited to general principles: we can come to know the prima facie duties this way, e.g. that, generally speaking, one should keep one's promises and refrain from harming others. But intuition is unable to reveal one's absolute duty in a particular situation: what one should do all things considered. All we can do is consult perception to determine which prima facie duty has the highest normative weight in this particular case, even though this usually does not amount to knowledge proper due to the complexity involved in most specific cases.

Ethical intuitionism suffered a dramatic fall from favor by the middle of the century, due in part to the influence of logical positivism, in part to the rising popularity of naturalism in philosophy, and in part to philosophical objections based on the phenomenon of widespread moral disagreement. C. L. Stevenson's emotivism would prove especially attractive to Moorean intuitionists seeking to avoid ethical naturalism. In the later parts of the 20th century, intuitionism would have few adherents to speak of; in Bernard Williams' words: "This model of intuition in ethics has been demolished by a succession of critics, and the ruins of it that remain above ground are not impressive enough to invite much history of what happened to it."

=== Contemporary developments ===
Some recent work suggests the view may be enjoying a resurgence of interest in academic philosophy. Robert Audi is one of the main contemporary supporters of ethical intuitionism. His 2005 book The Good in the Right claims to update and strengthen Rossian intuitionism and to develop the epistemology of ethics. Michael Huemer's book Ethical Intuitionism (2005) also provides a recent defense of the view. Furthermore, authors writing on normative ethics often accept methodological intuitionism as they present allegedly obvious or intuitive examples or thought experiments as support for their theories.

== Definitional issues ==
Because it was not until Sidgwick that it was clear there were several distinct theses sharing the label "ethical intuitionism", the term has developed many different connotations. This is liable to cause confusion; for example, G. E. Moore's Principia Ethica is often considered a locus classicus defense of ethical intuitionism, yet Moore explicitly refuses the label because of the large number of differences between his own views and traditional intuitionists.

=== Inessential connotations ===
Traditionally, intuitionism was often understood as having several other commitments:

1. Moral realism, the view that there are objective facts of morality (as held by Mark Platts).
2. Ethical non-naturalism, the view that these evaluative facts cannot be reduced to natural fact.
3. Classical foundationalism, i.e., the view that intuited moral beliefs are: infallible (indefeasible), indubitable (irresistibly compelling), incorrigible, certain, or understandable without reflection.
4. The view that moral properties are "simple" (as held by G. E. Moore).
5. The view that moral truths are knowable only by intuition.

However, none of these positions are essential to the view; most ethical intuitionists (such as G. E. Moore and W. D. Ross) simply happen to have held those views as well.

Furthermore, intuitionists are often understood to be essentially committed to the existence of a special psychological faculty that reliably produces true moral intuitions. Few intuitionists, however, have explicitly required such a faculty exist, and some, such as Richard Price, would have explicitly denied it exists.

==== Pluralism ====
Secondly, sometimes the term "ethical intuitionism" is associated with a pluralistic, deontological position in normative ethics, a position defended by most ethical intuitionists, with Henry Sidgwick and G. E. Moore being notable exceptions.

=== "Intuitivism" ===
Robert Audi points out that in applied ethics, philosophers frequently appeal to intuitions to justify their claims, even though they do not call themselves intuitionists. Audi hence uses the label "intuitivists" to refer to people who are intuitionists without labeling themselves as such.

On this broad understanding of intuitionism, there are only a few ways someone doing moral philosophy might not count as an intuitionist. First, they might really refrain from relying on intuitions in moral philosophy altogether (say, by attempting to derive all moral claims from claims about what certain individuals desire). Second, they might deny foundationalism in favor of (say) coherentism. Third, they might be non-cognitivists, holding that moral "beliefs" aren't really beliefs at all.

== Rational intuition versus moral sense ==
Some use the term "ethical intuitionism" in moral philosophy to refer to the general position that we have some non-inferential moral knowledge—that is, basic moral knowledge that is not inferred from or based on any proposition. However, it is important to distinguish between empiricist and rationalist models of this. Some, thus, reserve the term "ethical intuitionism" for the rationalist model and the term "moral sense theory" for the empiricist model. However, the terminology is not ultimately important, so long as one keeps in mind the relevant differences between these two views.

Generally speaking, rationalist ethical intuitionism models the acquisition of such non-inferential moral knowledge on a priori, non-empirical knowledge, such as knowledge of mathematical truths; whereas moral sense theory models the acquisition of such non-inferential moral knowledge on empirical knowledge, such as knowledge of the colors of objects (see moral sense theory).

=== Rational intuition ===
The rationalist version of ethical intuitionism models ethical intuitions on a priori, non-empirically-based intuitions of truths, such as basic truths of mathematics. Take for example the belief that two minus one is one. This piece of knowledge is often thought to be non-inferential in that it is not grounded in or justified by some other proposition or claim. Rather, one who understands the relevant concepts involved in the proposition that two minus one is one has what one might call an "intuition" of the truth of the proposition. One intuits the truth of the proposition, rather than inferring it. Likewise, the ethical intuitionist claims that basic moral truths—whether they are principles (such as don't kill people) or judgments (such as it is wrong to kill people)—are known without inference, and in particular they are known via one's rational intuition.

Some rationalist ethical intuitionists characterize moral "intuitions" as a species of belief that are self-evident in that they are justified simply by virtue of one's understanding of the proposition believed. Others characterize "intuitions" as a distinct kind of mental state, in which something seems to one to be the case (whether one believes it or not) as a result of intellectual reflection. Michael Huemer, for example, defines "intuition" as a sort of seeming:

Reasoning sometimes changes how things seem to us. But there is also a way things seem to us prior to reasoning; otherwise, reasoning could not get started. The way things seem prior to reasoning we may call an 'initial appearance'. An initial, intellectual appearance is an 'intuition'. That is, an intuition that p is a state of its seeming to one that p that is not dependent on inference from other beliefs and that results from thinking about p, as opposed to perceiving, remembering, or introspecting. An ethical intuition is an intuition whose content is an evaluative proposition. (§5.2)

Regardless of one's definition of rational intuition, intuitionists all agree that rational intuitions are not justified by inference from a separate belief.

=== Moral sense ===
Another version—what one might call the empiricist version—of ethical intuitionism models non-inferential ethical knowledge on sense perception. This version involves what is often called a "moral sense". According to moral sense theorists, certain moral truths are known via this moral sense simply on the basis of experience, not inference.

One way to understand the moral sense is to draw an analogy between it and other kinds of senses. Beauty, for example, is something we see in some faces, artworks and landscapes. We can also hear it in some pieces of music. We clearly do not need an independent aesthetic sense faculty to perceive beauty in the world. Our ordinary five senses are quite enough to observe it, though merely observing something beautiful is no guarantee that we can observe its beauty. In the same way, a color-blind person is not necessarily able to perceive the green color of grass although he is capable of vision. Suppose we give a name to this ability to appreciate the beauty in things we see: one might call it the aesthetic sense. This aesthetic sense does not come automatically to all people with perfect vision and hearing, so it is fair to describe it as something extra, something not wholly reducible to vision and hearing. As the aesthetic sense informs us about what is beautiful, we can analogically understand the moral sense as informing us of what is good. A modern example of a moral sensation is the impression of wrongness felt when one sees puppies being kicked.

== See also ==
=== Philosophers commonly identified as intuitionists ===
- Samuel Clarke
- Richard Price
- Francis Hutcheson
- William Whewell
- Henry Sidgwick
- G. E. Moore
- Michael Huemer
- Harold Arthur Prichard
- W. D. Ross
- Robert Audi
- C. S. Lewis
- Frances Power Cobbe

=== Books discussing intuitionism ===
- The Right and the Good

=== Related philosophical concepts ===
- Axiological ethics – Ethical theory about values
- Ethical non-naturalism – Meta-ethical view
- Moral blindness – Temporary inability to see the ethical aspects of decisions
- Moral sense theory – Theory in moral epistemology and meta-ethics concerning the discovery of moral truths

== Bibliography ==
- Audi, Robert (2004). The Good in the Right: A Theory of Intuition and Intrinsic Value. Princeton University Press. ISBN 9780691114347.
- Borchert, Donald (2006). "Sidgwick, Henry". Macmillan Encyclopedia of Philosophy, 2nd Edition. Macmillan.
- Brink, David O. (1989). Moral Realism and the Foundations of Ethics. Cambridge University Press. ISBN 9780511624612.
- Cowan, Robert (December 2015). "Clarifying Ethical Intuitionism" (PDF). European Journal of Philosophy. 23 (4): 1097–1116. doi:10.1111/ejop.12031.
- Craig, Edward (1996b). "Sidgwick, Henry". Routledge Encyclopedia of Philosophy. Routledge.
- Craig, Edward (1996). "Ross, William David". Routledge Encyclopedia of Philosophy. Routledge.
- Deigh, John (2013). "Ethics in the Analytic Tradition". In Roger Crisp (ed.). The Oxford Handbook of the History of Ethics. Oxford University Press.
- Franklin, James (27 April 2021). "'Let no‑one ignorant of geometry…': Mathematical parallels for understanding the objectivity of ethics". Journal of Value Inquiry. 57 (2): 365–384. doi:10.1007/s10790-021-09831-z. hdl:1959.4/unsworks_75421.
- Hare, R.M (1997). Sorting Out Ethics. Oxford University Press. ISBN 9780198250326.
- Honderich, Ted (2005). "Sidgwick, Henry". The Oxford Companion to Philosophy. Oxford University Press.
- Huemer, Michael (2005). Ethical Intuitionism. Palgrave Macmillan.
- Lewis, C.S. (1943). The Abolition of Man. MacMillan Publishing Company.
- Louden, Robert B. (1996). "Toward a Genealogy of 'Deontology'". Journal of the History of Philosophy. 34 (4). Johns Hopkins University Press: 571–592. doi:10.1353/hph.1996.0070.
- Mackie, J.L. (1977). Ethics: Inventing Right and Wrong. Penguin.
- Moore, G.E. (1993). Principia Ethica (revised ed.). Cambridge University Press.
- Prichard, H.A. (1912). "Does Moral Philosophy Rest on a Mistake?". Mind. 21.
- Ross, W. D. (2002) [1930]. The Right and the Good. Clarendon Press., s.a. The Right and the Good on WP
- Shafer-Landau, Russ; Cuneo, Terence, eds. (2012). Foundations of Ethics: An Anthology. Blackwell Publishing.
- Sidgwick, Henry (1907). The Methods of Ethics. Macmillan.
- Sidgwick, Henry (1931). Outlines of the History of Ethics (6th (enlarged) ed.). Macmillan.
- Simpson, David L. "William David Ross". Internet Encyclopedia of Philosophy.
- Sinnott-Armstrong, Walter (17 August 2006a). "Moral Skepticism". In Zalta, Edward N. (ed.). Stanford Encyclopedia of Philosophy. ISSN 1095-5054. OCLC 429049174.
- Sinnott-Armstrong, Walter (2006). Moral Skepticisms. Oxford University Press. ISBN 9780199786121.
- Skelton, Anthony (2012). "William David Ross". Stanford Encyclopedia of Philosophy. Metaphysics Research Lab, Stanford University.
- Stratton-Lake, Philip (2013). "Rational Intuitionism". In Roger Crisp (ed.). The Oxford Handbook of the History of Ethics. Oxford University Press.
- Stratton-Lake, Philip (2014). E. Zalta (ed.). "Intuitionism in Ethics". Stanford Encyclopedia of Philosophy.
- Sturgeon, Nicholas (2002). "Ethical Intuitionism and Ethical Naturalism". Ethical Intuitionism: Re-evaluations. Oxford University Press.
- Williams, Bernard (2011). Ethics and the Limits of Philosophy. Routledge Classics. ISBN 978-0415610148.
