= Robert Audi =

American philosopher (born 1941)

Robert N. Audi (born November 1941) is an American philosopher whose major work has focused on epistemology, ethics (especially on ethical intuitionism), rationality and the theory of action. He is O'Brien Professor of Philosophy at the University of Notre Dame, and previously held a chair in the business school there. His 2005 book, The Good in the Right, updates and strengthens Rossian intuitionism and develops the epistemology of ethics. He has also written important works of political philosophy, particularly on the relationship between church and state. He is a past president of the American Philosophical Association and the Society of Christian Philosophers.

Audi's contributions to epistemology include his defense of fallibilistic foundationalism. Audi has expanded his theory of justification to non-doxastic states, e.g. desires and intentions, by developing a comprehensive account of rationality. A mental state is rational if it is "well-grounded" in a source of justification. Justification can come directly from experience (e.g. perception) or indirectly from other mental states that are themselves justified. Rationality is relative to a person's experiences, so what is rational to believe for one person may be irrational to believe for another. Audi has also developed an account of autonomy, which he characterizes as the self-governing power to bring reasons to bear in directing one's conduct and influencing one's propositional attitudes. Self-legislation is necessary but not sufficient for autonomy since it lacks the power to govern by itself. Autonomy involves responding to reasons in a principled way by endorsing commitments to projects and practical principles.

== Life ==
Audi earned his BA from Colgate University and his MA and PhD from the University of Michigan. He taught initially at the University of Texas at Austin, and then for many years as the Charles J. Mach University Professor of Philosophy at the University of Nebraska–Lincoln before moving to University of Notre Dame as Professor of Philosophy, Professor of Management, and the David E. Gallo Chair in Ethics. In 2009 he vacated the Gallo Chair and took a chair as John A. O'Brien Professor of Philosophy. He has served as General Editor of the First Edition (1995) and Second Edition (1999) of The Cambridge Dictionary of Philosophy. He has also served as the general editor for "Modern Readings in Epistemology", as well as for "Modern readings in Metaphysics".

In an interview for the Brooklyn Friends School of which he's an alumnus (year 1959), he revealed that his interest in philosophy came from his father, a businessman and Lebanese immigrant with an interest in philosophy and history. His mother, a medical doctor and faculty at NYU Medical School, was also an influence. "'Both liked to explain and comment on things,' Robert mused, 'and they often entertained people from the diplomatic world and medicine who argued about politics, religion and ideas in general.'" Audi was named a Fellow of the American Academy of Arts and Sciences in 2018.

== Philosophical work ==
=== Epistemology ===
Audi has defended a position he calls "fallibilistic foundationalism." He thinks that the foundationalist response is the only tenable option of the epistemic regress argument. This states that if every belief has to be justified by some other, then the only options are four: infinite regress, circularity, stopping at a belief that is not knowledge, and stopping at a basic belief that is itself justified. If the only alternative is the fourth, then if one has knowledge, one has foundational knowledge. Audi considers that foundationalism is usually taken to be infallible. That is, it is normally associated with the view that knowledge is founded on basic beliefs that are axiomatic and necessarily true, and that the rest of knowledge is deduced from this set of beliefs. Audi thinks that foundationalism may be fallible, in the sense that the suprastructure of beliefs may be derived inductively from the basic beliefs, and hence may be fallible. He also thinks that basic beliefs need not be necessary truths, but merely have some structure which makes epistemic transition possible. For example, the belief that one is in the presence of an object arises causally from visual perception.

=== Rationality ===
The main account of Audi's theory of rationality is laid out in his book "The Architecture of Reason: The Structure and Substance of Rationality". He develops a comprehensive account of rationality that covers both the theoretical and the practical side of rationality. Theoretical rationality concerns beliefs and counts towards truth while practical rationality covers desires, intentions, and actions and counts towards goodness.

==== Ground ====
The notion of a ground plays a central role for rationality: a mental state is rational if it is "well-grounded" in a source of justification. For example, the perceptual experience of a tree when looking outside the window can ground the belief that there is a tree outside. A ground can psychologically support a mental state. Mental states may be supported by several grounds at the same time. Audi compares such a mental state to a porch that is supported by various pillars. For a mental state to be rational, it has to be well-grounded, i.e. be supported by an adequate ground. Irrational mental states, on the other hand, lack a sufficient ground.

==== Foundation and superstructure ====
Audi is committed to a form of foundationalism: the idea that justified beliefs, or in his case, rational states in general, can be divided into two groups: the foundation and the superstructure. The mental states in the superstructure receive their justification from other rational mental states while the foundational mental states receive their justification from a more basic source. These relations result in a hierarchy: justification is conveyed from the basic sources to the foundational mental states and transmitted from the foundational mental states to the mental states in the superstructure. For example, the above-mentioned belief that there is a tree outside is foundational since it is based on a basic source: perception. Knowing that trees grow in soil, we may deduce that there is soil outside. This belief is equally rational, being supported by an adequate ground, but it belongs to the superstructure since its rationality is grounded in the rationality of another belief. Desires, like beliefs, form a hierarchy: intrinsic desires are at the foundation while instrumental desires belong to the superstructure. In order to link the instrumental desire to the intrinsic desire and extra element is needed: a belief that the fulfillment of the instrumental desire is a means to the fulfillment of the intrinsic desire. Audi's foundationalism is different from what he terms "Cartesian foundationalism" in the sense that all justification, including justification from basic sources, is defeasible. The Cartesian view, on the other hand, ascribes certainty and infallibility to the foundational mental states.

==== Beliefs and desires ====
Audi asserts that all the basic sources providing justification for the foundational mental states come from experience. As for beliefs, there are four types of experience that act as sources: perception, memory, introspection, and rational intuition. The main basic source of the rationality of desires, on the other hand, comes in the form of hedonic experience: the experience of pleasure and pain. So, for example, a desire to eat ice-cream is rational if it is based on experiences in which the agent enjoyed the taste of ice-cream, and irrational if it lacks such a support. Because of its dependence on experience, rationality can be defined as a kind of responsiveness to experience.

==== Actions ====
Actions, in contrast to beliefs and desires, don't have a source of justification of their own. Their rationality is grounded in the rationality of other states instead: in the rationality of beliefs and desires. Desires motivate actions. Beliefs are needed here, as in the case of instrumental desires, to bridge a gap and link two elements. The link needed is that the execution of the action will contribute to the fulfillment of the desire. So, for example, the intrinsic desire for ice-cream can motivate a person to perform the action of going to the freezer to get some. But in addition a belief is needed: that the freezer contains ice-cream. The rationality of the action depends on the rationality of both the desire and the belief. If there is no good reason to believe that the freezer contains ice-cream then the belief is irrational. Irrational beliefs can't transmit justification, so the action is also irrational.

==== Persons ====
Audi distinguishes the focal rationality of individual mental states from the global rationality of persons. Global rationality has a derivative status: it depends on the focal rationality. Or more precisely: "Global rationality is reached when a person has a sufficiently integrated system of sufficiently well-grounded propositional attitudes, emotions, and actions". This allows for a certain number of irrational attitudes: global rationality doesn't require perfect rationality.

==== Truth and relativity ====
That a belief is rational doesn't entail that it is true. This is the case, for example, when the experiences that act as the source of a belief are illusory without the subject being aware of this. In such cases, it is rational to have a false belief and it would be irrational to have a true belief.

Rationality is relative in the sense that it depends on the experience of the person in question. Since different people undergo different experiences, what is rational to believe for one person may be irrational to believe for another person.

==== Criticism ====
Gilbert Harman has criticized Audi's account of rationality because of its reliance on experience as the ultimate source of justification. As he points out, our experience at any moment is very narrow compared to all the unconscious beliefs we carry with us all the time: beliefs about word meanings, acquaintances, historical dates, etc. So our experience at any time can only justify a very small number of the beliefs we have. This would mean that the great majority of our beliefs are irrational most of the time. This apparent consequence of Audi's account is opposed to the common-sense view that most people are rational at least some if not most of the time.

=== Autonomy ===
Robert Audi characterizes autonomy as the self-governing power to bring reasons to bear in directing one's conduct and influencing one's propositional attitudes. Traditionally, autonomy is only concerned with practical matters. But, as Audi's definition suggests, autonomy may be applied to responding to reasons at large, not just to practical reasons. Autonomy is closely related to freedom but the two can come apart. An example would be a political prisoner who is forced to make a statement in favor of his opponents in order to ensure that his loved ones are not harmed. As Audi points out, the prisoner lacks freedom but still has autonomy since his statement, though not reflecting his political ideals, is still an expression of his commitment to his loved ones.

==== Self-legislation ====
Autonomy is often equated with self-legislation in the Kantian tradition. Self-legislation may be interpreted as laying down laws or principles that are to be followed. Audi agrees with this school in the sense that we should bring reasons to bear in a principled way. Responding to reasons by mere whim may still be considered free but not autonomous. A commitment to principles and projects, on the other hand, provides autonomous agents with an identity over time and gives them a sense of the kind of persons they want to be. But autonomy is neutral as to which principles or projects the agent endorses. So different autonomous agents may follow very different principles.

==== Self-government ====
But, as Audi points out, self-legislation is not sufficient for autonomy since laws that don't have any practical impact don't constitute autonomy. Some form of motivational force or executive power is necessary in order to get from mere self-legislation to self-government. This motivation may be inherent in the corresponding practical judgment itself, a position known as motivational internalism, or may come to the practical judgment externally in the form of some desire independent of the judgment, as motivational externalism holds.

==== Reasons ====
In the Humean tradition, intrinsic desires are the reasons the autonomous agent should respond to. This theory is called instrumentalism. Given this outlook, autonomy would be the "capacity to subordinate one's conduct to one's strongest desire(s)" with the goal of satisfying as many desires as possible. One of the problems of instrumentalism is that it lacks the resources to distinguish between good and bad intrinsic desires. For example, if someone finds himself with an intrinsic desire to hurt others, instrumentalism recommends that he should try to do so as efficiently as possible. Audi suggests that we should adopt a position known as axiological objectivism in order to avoid this counterintuitive conclusion. The central idea of this outlook is that objective values, and not subjective desires, are the sources of normativity and therefore determine what we should do. Reason can, through rational reflection, arrive at ideals of conduct in the light of these objective values, for example, to promote pleasure and to impede pain in oneself and others. The autonomous person would endorse the ideals arrived at and realize them in her behavior.

== Selected bibliography ==
=== Monographs ===
- Belief, Justification, and Knowledge: An Introduction to Epistemology. Belmont, CA: Wadsworth Publishing Company, 1988, ISBN 0534084001.
- Action, Intention, and Reason. Ithaca, NY: Cornell University Press, 1993, ISBN 0801428661.
- The Structure of Justification. Cambridge; New York: Cambridge University Press, 1993, ISBN 0521440645.
- Moral Knowledge and Ethical Character. New York: Oxford University Press, 1997, ISBN 019511468X.
- Epistemology: A Contemporary Introduction to the Theory of Knowledge. London: Routledge, 1998, ISBN 0415130425. Second edition: 2002, ISBN 0415281083. Third edition: 2010, ISBN 9780415879224.
- Religious Commitment and Secular Reason. Cambridge, UK: Cambridge University Press, 2000, ISBN 0521772605.
- The Architecture of Reason: The Structure and Substance of Rationality. New York: Oxford University Press, 2001, ISBN 0195141121.
- The Good in the Right: A Theory of Intuition and Intrinsic Value. Princeton, NJ: Princeton University Press, 2004, ISBN 069111434X.
- Practical Reasoning and Ethical Decision. London: Routledge, 2006, ISBN 0415364620.
- Moral Value and Human Diversity. Oxford, UK: Oxford University Press, 2008, ISBN 9780195374117.
- Business Ethics and Ethical Business. Oxford, UK: Oxford University Press, 2009, ISBN 9780195369113.
- Reasons, Rights, and Values. Cambridge, UK: Cambridge University Press, 2015, ISBN 1107096901.

=== Co-authored books and edited volumes ===
- Rationality, religious belief, and moral commitment: new essays in the philosophy of religion (with William J. Wainwright). Ithaca, NY: Cornell University Press, 1986, ISBN 0801418569.
- Cambridge Dictionary of Philosophy. Cambridge, UK: Cambridge University Press, 1995, ISBN 0521402247. Second edition: 1999, ISBN 9780521631365.
- Religion in the Public Square: The Place of Religious Convictions in Public Debate (with Nicholas Wolterstorff). Lanham, MD: Rowman and Littlefield, 1997, ISBN 0847683419.
- Rationality, rules, and ideals: critical essays on Bernard Gert's Moral Theory (with Walter Sinnott-Armstrong). Lanham, MD: Rowman and Littlefield, 2002, ISBN 0742513165.

== See also ==
- American philosophy
- Christian philosophy
- List of American philosophers
