= Moral sense theory =

Theory in moral epistemology and meta-ethics concerning the discovery of moral truths

Moral sense theory (also known as moral sentimentalism) is a theory in moral epistemology and meta-ethics concerning the discovery of moral truths. Moral sense theory typically holds that distinctions between morality and immorality are discovered by emotional responses to experience. Some take it to be primarily a view about the nature of moral facts or moral beliefs (a primarily metaphysical view)—this form of the view more often goes by the name "sentimentalism". Others take the view to be primarily about the nature of justifying moral beliefs (a primarily epistemological view)—this form of the view more often goes by the name "moral sense theory". However, some theorists take the view to be one which claims that both moral facts and how one comes to be justified in believing them are necessarily bound up with human emotions.

Popular historical advocates of some version of the moral sense theory or sentimentalism include the 3rd Earl of Shaftesbury (1671–1713), Francis Hutcheson (1694–1746), David Hume (1711–1776), and Adam Smith (1723–1790). Some contemporary advocates include Michael Slote, Justin D'Arms, Daniel Jacobson, Jesse Prinz, Jonathan Haidt, and perhaps John McDowell. Simon Blackburn and Allan Gibbard endorse a non-cognitivist form of sentimentalism.

== Intuition versus moral sense ==
Some use the term "ethical intuitionism" in moral philosophy to refer to the general position that we have some non-inferential moral knowledge (that is, basic moral knowledge that is not inferred from or based on any proposition). On this definition, moral sense theory is a form of ethical intuitionism.

However, it is important to distinguish between empiricist versus rationalist models of this. One may thus distinguish between rationalist ethical intuitionism for the rationalist version and "moral sense theory" for the empiricist version. (This will be the use of the terms here. However, the terminology is not ultimately important, so long as one keeps in mind the relevant differences between these two models of non-inferential moral knowledge.)

== History ==
The first prominent moral sense theory (especially using the term "sense") is found in Mencius (372–289 BCE). The eponymous text deals with an innate moral sense possessed by all human beings. All orthodox interpretations of Confucianism accept this view, several unorthodox groups make a point of refuting it (see: Xunzi). This line of thinking reached its most extreme iteration in xinxue, a form of Neo-Confucianism associated with the Ming Dynasty and Wang Yangming.

In the West, the first prominent moral sense theory is found in Anthony Ashley-Cooper, 3rd Earl of Shaftesbury (1671–1713). His major work espousing a form of moral sense theory is An Inquiry Concerning Virtue, or Merit (first published in an unauthorized edition in 1699).

Subsequently, Francis Hutcheson (1694–1746) developed a version of moral sense theory. The chief statements of his theory occur in An Inquiry Concerning the Original of Our Ideas of Virtue or Moral Good (1725; Treatise II of An Inquiry Into the Original of Our Ideas of Beauty and Virtue) and An Essay On the Nature and Conduct of the Passions and Affections, With Illustrations Upon the Moral Sense (1728).

Arguably the most prominent defender of moral sense theory in the history of philosophy is David Hume (1711–1776). While he discusses morality in Book 3 of his Treatise of Human Nature (1739–40), Hume's most mature, positive account of the moral sense is found in An Enquiry Concerning the Principles of Morals (1751).

Adam Smith also advanced a form of moral sense theory in his The Theory of Moral Sentiments (1759). Smith focused less on a single faculty of the moral sense and more on the various sentiments that make up the moral feelings that ground moral judgments.

Thomas Reid (1710–1796) defends moral sense theory in his Essays on the Active Powers of the Human Mind. He compares the moral sense to sight and hearing, and defends its veridicality on the same ground as those.

The introduction of Herbert Spencer's Social Statics argued on behalf of moral sense theory.

== Overview ==
The moral sense is often described as providing information in a way analogous to other sensory modalities, such as sight in the perception of colors. It is contrasted with the way in which one acquires a priori, non-empirical knowledge, such as mathematical knowledge for example.

One way to understand the moral sense is to draw an analogy between it and other kinds of senses. Beauty is something we see in some faces, artworks and landscapes. We can also hear it in some pieces of music. We clearly do not need an independent aesthetic sense faculty to perceive beauty in the world. Our ordinary five senses are quite enough to observe it, though merely observing something beautiful is not by itself enough to appreciate its beauty. Suppose we give a name to this ability to appreciate the beauty in things we see: let's call it the aesthetic sense.

This aesthetic sense does not come automatically to all people with perfect vision and hearing, so it is fair to describe it as something extra, something not wholly reducible to vision and hearing. As the aesthetic sense informs us about what is beautiful, we can analogically understand the moral sense as informing us of what is good. People with a functioning moral sense get a clear impression of wrongness when they see (or perhaps even imagine) someone being mugged, for example.

However, though the wrongness is obvious, we may find it very difficult to list the features of the scene which account for the wrongness. We discover wrongness through observing natural properties with our five senses. Can we list the necessary and sufficient conditions such that any action which satisfies these conditions is wrong?

The ethical naturalist thinks that in principle, we can. For naturalists, rightness and wrongness are nothing more than certain combinations of natural, non-evaluative properties. Since we can in principle build mechanical detectors for all these natural properties, the ethical naturalist thinks wrongness is something that a machine could eventually detect.

The ethical intuitionist typically disagrees (although, it is not essential to the view): they see a wide conceptual gap between natural facts and evaluations. There seem to be no valid arguments in which purely descriptive/factual premises entail a prescriptive/evaluative conclusion.

Ethical intuitionists claim that only an agent with a moral sense can observe natural properties and through them discover the moral properties of the situation. Without the moral sense, you might see and hear all the colors and yelps, but the moral properties would remain hidden, and there would be in principle no way to ever discover them (except, of course, via testimony from someone else with a moral sense).

== Criticisms ==
The key opponents of moral sense theory (as a primarily epistemological view) are rationalist ethical intuitionists—such as G.E. Moore (1903), W.D. Ross (1930), and Michael Huemer (2005), and other moral rationalists, such as Immanuel Kant and Samuel Clarke.

For a recent criticism of sentimentalism (as a primarily metaphysical thesis), see François Schroeter (2006). D'Arms and Jacobson (2000) also provide a recent critique; however, they criticize "simple sentimentalism" and defend a more "sophisticated sentimentalism".

Joshua Greene criticizes the epistemic basis of moral sentimentalism because of beliefs formed in response to morally irrelevant factors. These factors change our moral decisions, but they should not because they do not have a bearing on the morality of the decision. The example he uses is the trolley problem and compares it to the fat man rendition of it. Empirical data shows that people chose differently between the two scenarios despite the consequences being the same; the only difference being pulling a switch in the former and pushing the man in the latter.

== See also ==
- Ethical intuitionism

== References and further reading ==
- Campbell, Richmond (2003). "Moral Epistemology", The Stanford Encyclopedia of Philosophy Edward N. Zalta (ed.). (link)
- Cohon, Rachel (2004). "Hume's Moral Philosophy", The Stanford Encyclopedia of Philosophy, E. Zalta (ed.). (link)
- D'Arms, J. & Jacobson, D. (2000). "Sentiment and Value", Ethics, Vol. 110, No. 4, pp. 722–748.
- Fieser, James (2006). "David Hume (1711-1776) - Moral Theory", The Internet Encyclopedia of Philosophy, J. Fieser and B.H. Dowden (eds.) U. Tennessee/Martin. (link)
- Gill, Michael B. (2006). "Lord Shaftesbury [Anthony Ashley Cooper, 3rd Earl of Shaftesbury]", The Stanford Encyclopedia of Philosophy (Winter 2006 Edition), Edward N. Zalta (ed.). (link)
- Kauppinan, Antii (2014). " Moral Sentimentalism", The Stanford Encyclopedia of Philosophy (Winter 2018 Edition), Edward N. Zalta (ed.). (
- Moore, G.E. (1903). Principia Ethica, Cambridge University Press.
- Prinz, Jesse (2006). "The Emotional Basis of Moral Judgments", Philosophical Explorations, vol. 9, no. 1.
- Ross, W.D. (1930). The Right and the Good, Oxford: Clarendon Press.
- Huemer, Michael (2005). Ethical Intuitionism, Palgrave Macmillan.
- Raphael, D.D. (ed.) (1991). British Moralists: 1650-1800, 2 Vols., Indianapolis, IN: Hackett Publishing. Company.
- Schroeter, François (2006). "The Limits of Sentimentalism", Ethics, Vol. 116, pp. 337–361.
- Sinnott-Armstrong, Walter (2006a). "Moral Skepticism", The Stanford Encyclopedia of Philosophy, Edward N. Zalta (ed.). (link)
- Sinnott-Armstrong, Walter (2006b). Moral Skepticisms, Oxford University Press.
- Kane, Robert H. Quest for Meaning: Values, Ethics, and the Modern Experience. Lecture 6, "Hume and the Challenge of Relativism"and Lecture 7, "Cultural Diversity, Human Nature, and the Social Sciences". The Teaching Company
