= Prima facie =

Latin expression meaning "at first sight"

Prima facie (/ˌpraɪmə ˈfeɪʃi, -ʃə, -ʃiiː/; from Latin prīmā faciē) is a Latin expression meaning "at first sight", or "based on first impression". The literal translation would be "at first face" or "at first appearance", from the feminine forms of primus ("first") and facies ("face"), both in the ablative case. In modern, colloquial, and conversational English, a common translation would be "on the face of it".

The term prima facie is used in modern legal English (including both civil law and criminal law) to signify that upon initial examination, sufficient corroborating evidence appears to exist to support a case. In common law jurisdictions, a reference to prima facie evidence denotes evidence that, unless rebutted, would be sufficient to prove a particular proposition or fact. The term is used similarly in academic philosophy. Most legal proceedings, in most jurisdictions, require a prima facie case to exist, following which proceedings may then commence to test it, and create a ruling.

The similar ex facie, Latin for "on the face [of it]," is a legal term typically used to note that a document's explicit terms are defective without further investigation. For example, in a jurisdiction where consideration is a binding requirement for contract validity, a contract between two parties would be void ex facie if it did not require party A to give consideration to party B for services rendered.

== Burden of proof ==
In most legal proceedings, one party has a burden of proof that requires it to present prima facie evidence for all of the essential facts in its case. If it cannot, its claim may be dismissed without any need for a response by other parties. A prima facie case might not stand or fall on its own; if an opposing party introduces other evidence or asserts an affirmative defense, it can be reconciled only with a full trial. Sometimes the introduction of prima facie evidence is informally called making a case or building a case. For example, in a trial under criminal law, the prosecution has the burden of presenting prima facie evidence of each element of the crime charged against the defendant. In a murder case, this would include evidence that the victim was in fact dead, that the defendant's act caused the death, and that the defendant acted with malice aforethought. If no party introduces new evidence, the case stands or falls just by the prima facie evidence or lack thereof, respectively.

Prima facie evidence need not be conclusive or irrefutable: at this stage, evidence rebutting the case is not considered, only whether any party's case has enough merit to take it to a full trial. In common law jurisdictions such as the United Kingdom and the United States, the prosecution in a criminal trial must disclose all evidence to the defense. This includes the prima facie evidence. An aim of the doctrine of prima facie is to prevent litigants from bringing spurious charges which simply waste all other parties' time.

== Res ipsa loquitur ==
Prima facie is often confused with res ipsa loquitur ('the thing speaks for itself', or literally 'the thing itself speaks'), the common law doctrine that when the facts make it self-evident that negligence or other responsibility lies with a party, it is unnecessary to provide extraneous details, since any reasonable person would immediately find the facts of the case. The difference between the two is that prima facie is a term meaning there is enough evidence for there to be a case to answer, while res ipsa loquitur means that the facts are so obvious a party need not explain more. For example: "There is a prima facie case that the defendant is liable. They controlled the pump. The pump was left on and flooded the plaintiff's house. The plaintiff was away and had left the house in the control of the defendant. Res ipsa loquitur." In Canadian tort law, this doctrine has been subsumed by general negligence law.

== Use in academic philosophy ==
The phrase is also used in academic philosophy. Among its most notable uses is in the theory of ethics first proposed by W. D. Ross in his 1930 book The Right and the Good, often called the Ethic of Prima Facie Duties, as well as in epistemology, as used, for example, by Robert Audi. It is generally used in reference to an obligation. "I have a prima facie obligation to keep my promise and meet my friend" means that the speaker is under an obligation, but this may yield to a more pressing duty. Later usage prefers the title pro tanto obligation: an obligation that may be later overruled by another more pressing one; it exists only pro tempore.

== Other uses and references ==
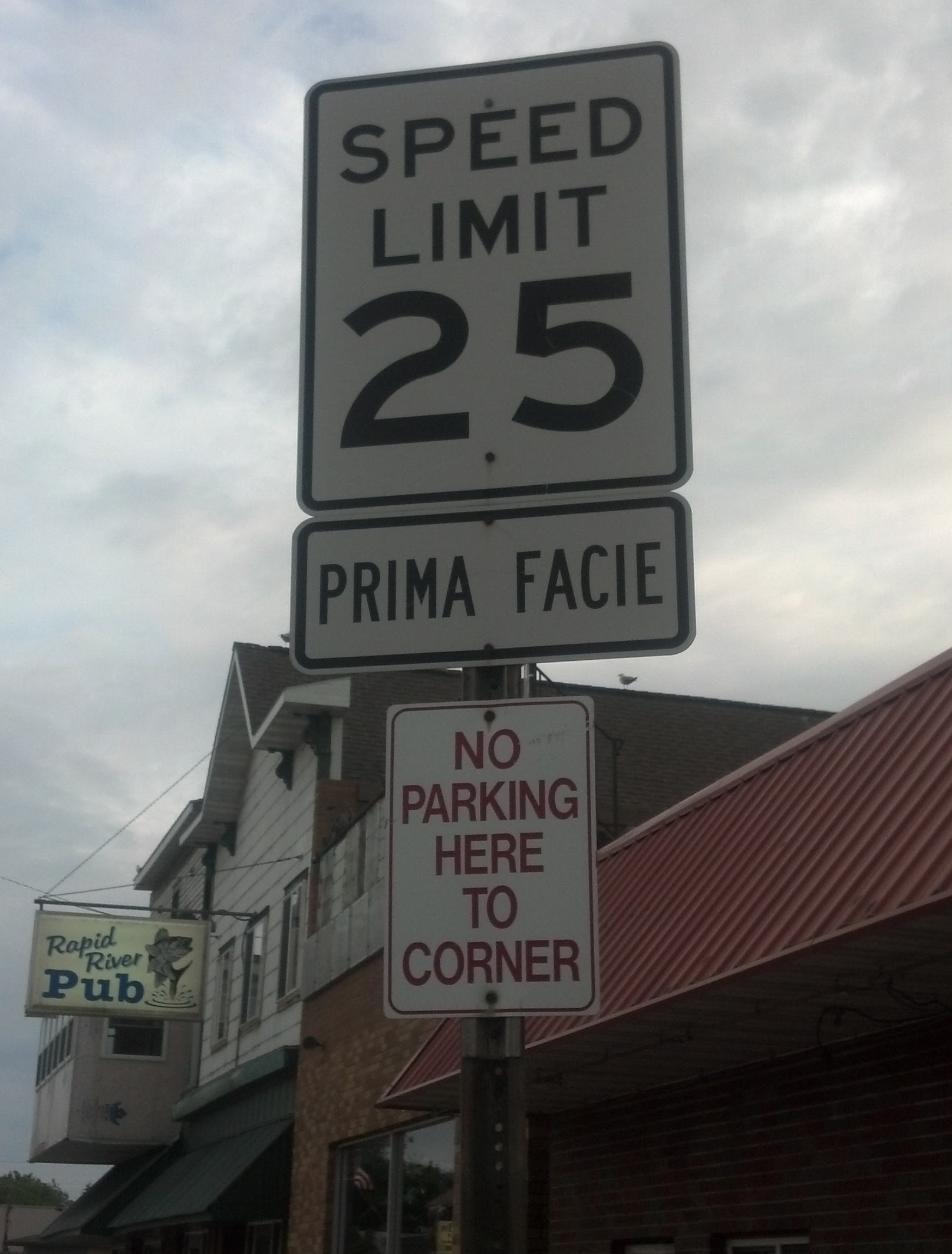
Example of a prima facie speed limit posted in Rapid River, Michigan

The phrase prima facie is sometimes misspelled prima facia in the mistaken belief that facia is the actual Latin word; however, faciē is the ablative case of faciēs, a fifth declension Latin noun. In policy debate theory, prima facie describes the mandates or planks of an affirmative case, or, in some rare cases, a negative counterplan. When the negative team appeals to prima facie, it appeals to the affirmative team's inability to add or amend anything in its plan after being stated in the first affirmative constructive.

A common usage of the phrase is the concept of a "prima facie speed limit", which has been used in Australia and the United States. A prima facie speed limit is a default speed limit that applies when no other specific speed limit is posted, and may be exceeded by a driver; however, if the driver is detected, and cited by police for exceeding the limit, the onus of proof is on the driver to show that his speed was safe under the circumstances. Most jurisdictions have replaced this type of speed limit with absolute speed limits.

== See also ==
- Advisory speed limit
- Defeasible reasoning
- List of Latin phrases
- Probable cause
- Proximate cause
