= W. D. Ross =

Scottish philosopher and translator (1877–1971)

Sir W. D. Ross KBE FBA
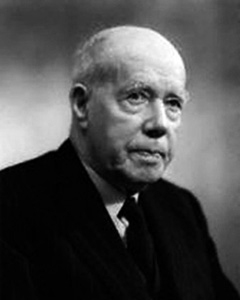
- Born: William David Ross; 15 April 1877; Thurso, Scotland
- Died: 5 May 1971 (aged 94); Oxford, England

Education
- Education: University of Edinburgh; Balliol College, Oxford
- Academic advisor: John Cook Wilson

Philosophical work
- Era: 20th-century philosophy
- Region: Western philosophy
- School: Analytic philosophy
- Institutions: University of Oxford
- Main interests: Ethics, Greek philosophy
- Notable ideas: Deontological pluralism (ethical non-naturalism / ethical intuitionism / ethical pluralism), prima facie moral duties, criticism of consequentialism

Sir William David Ross (15 April 1877 – 5 May 1971), known as David Ross but usually cited as W. D. Ross, was a Scottish Aristotelian philosopher, translator, WWI veteran, civil servant, and university administrator. His best-known work is The Right and the Good (1930), in which he developed a pluralist, deontological form of intuitionist ethics in response to G. E. Moore's consequentialist form of intuitionism. Ross also critically edited and translated a number of Aristotle's works, such as his 12-volume translation of Aristotle together with John Alexander Smith, and wrote on other Greek philosophy.

== Life ==
William David Ross was born in Thurso, Caithness in the north of Scotland the son of John Ross (1835–1905).

He spent most of his first six years as a child in southern India. He was educated at the Royal High School, Edinburgh, and the University of Edinburgh. In 1895, he gained a first class MA honours degree in classics. He completed his studies at Balliol College, Oxford, with a First in Classical Moderations in 1898 and a First in Literae Humaniores ('Greats', a combination of philosophy and ancient history) in 1900. He was made a Fellow of Merton College in 1900, a position he held until 1945; he was elected to a tutorial fellowship at Oriel College in October 1902.

With the outbreak of World War I, Ross joined the army in 1915 with a commission on the special list. He held a series of positions involved with the supply of munitions. At the time of the armistice he held the rank of major and was Deputy Assistant Secretary in the Ministry of Munitions. He was made an Officer of the Order of the British Empire in 1918 in recognition of his wartime service. For his post-war services to various public bodies he was made a Knight Commander of the Order of the British Empire in 1938.

Ross was White's Professor of Moral Philosophy (1923–1928), Provost of Oriel College, Oxford (1929–1947), Vice-Chancellor of the University of Oxford from 1941 to 1944 and Pro-Vice-Chancellor (1944–1947). He was president of the Aristotelian Society from 1939 to 1940. He was elected a Fellow of the British Academy and was its president from 1936 to 1940. Of the many governmental committees on which he served one was the Civil Service Tribunal, of which he was chairman. One of his two colleagues was Leonard Woolf, who thought that the whole system of fixing governmental remuneration should be on the same basis as the US model, dividing the civil service into a relatively small number of pay grades. Ross did not agree with this radical proposal. In 1947 he was appointed chairman of the first Royal Commission on the Press, United Kingdom, elected an honorary fellow of Trinity College Dublin, and elected an International Member of the American Philosophical Society. He was elected to the American Academy of Arts and Sciences in 1950.

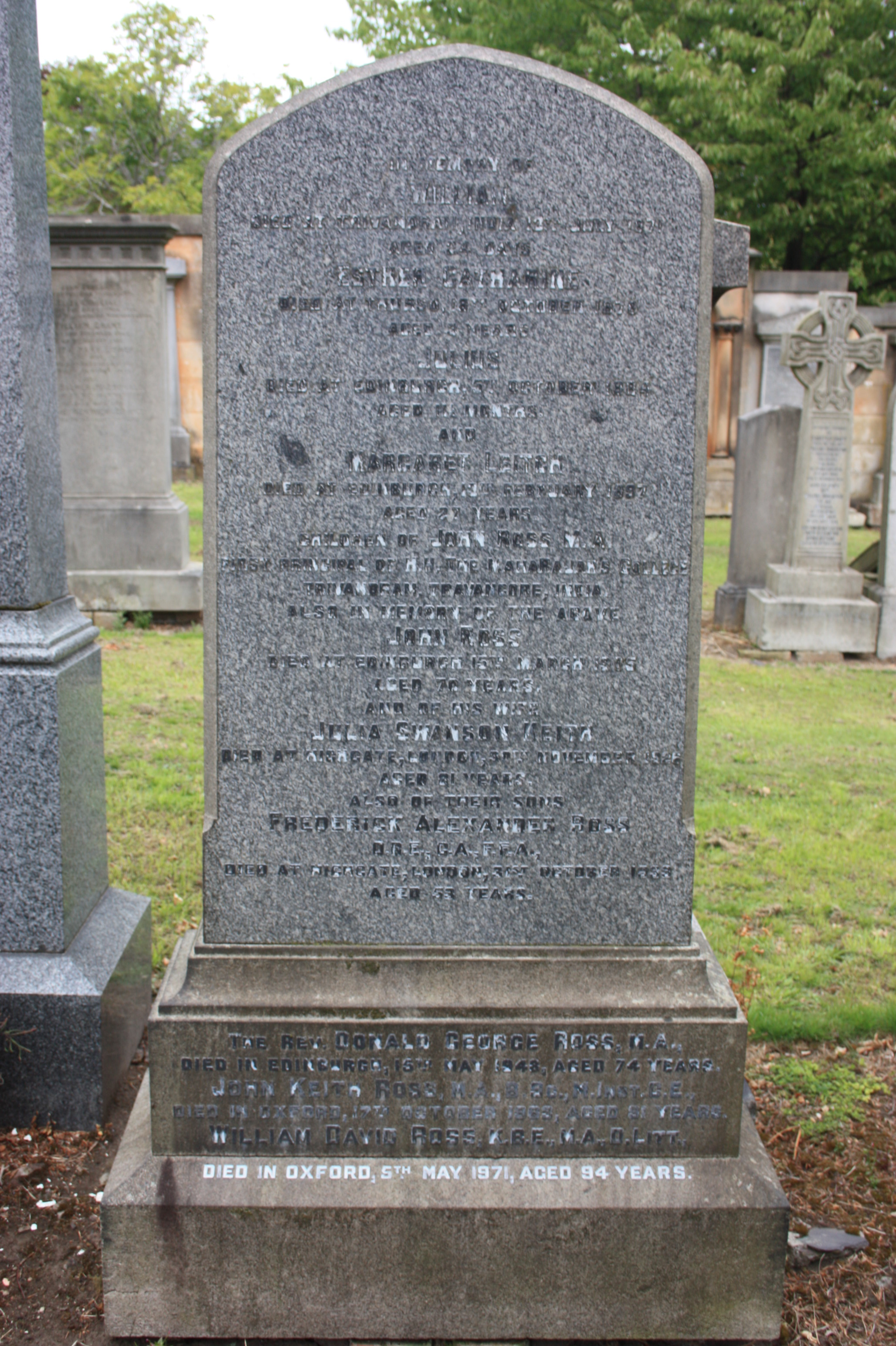
The Ross family grave, Grange Cemetery

He died in Oxford on 5 May 1971. He is memorialised on his parents' grave in the Grange Cemetery in Edinburgh.

== Family ==
His younger brother was Presbyterian minister Donald George Ross (1879–1943).

He married Edith Ogden in 1906 and they had four daughters, Margaret (who married Robin Harrison), Eleanor, Rosalind (who married John Miller Martin), and Katharine. Edith died in 1953.

He was a cousin of Berriedale Keith.

== Ethical theory ==
Ross was a moral realist, a non-naturalist, and an intuitionist. He argued that there are moral truths. He wrote:

The moral order ... is just as much part of the fundamental nature of the universe (and ... of any possible universe in which there are moral agents at all) as is the spatial or numerical structure expressed in the axioms of geometry or arithmetic.

Thus, according to Ross, the claim that something is good is true if that thing really is good. Ross also agreed with G. E. Moore's claim that any attempt to define ethical statements solely in terms of statements about the natural world commits the naturalistic fallacy. Furthermore, the terms right and good are "indefinable". This means not only that they cannot be defined in terms of natural properties but also that it is not possible to define one in terms of the other.

Ross rejected Moore's consequentialist ethics. According to consequentialist theories, what people ought to do is determined only by whether their actions will bring about the best. By contrast, Ross argues that maximising the good is only one of several prima facie duties (prima facie obligations) which play a role in determining what a person ought to do in any given case.

=== Duties ===
In The Right and the Good, Ross lists seven prima facie duties, without claiming his list to be exhaustive: fidelity; reparation; gratitude; justice; beneficence; non-maleficence; and self-improvement. In any given situation, any number of these prima facie duties may apply. In the case of ethical dilemmas, they may even contradict one another. Someone could have a prima facie duty of reparation, say, a duty to help people who helped you move house, move house themselves, and a prima facie duty of fidelity, such as taking one's children on a promised trip to the park, and these could conflict. Nonetheless, there can never be a true ethical dilemma, Ross argued, because one of the prima facie duties in a given situation is always the weightiest, and over-rules all the others. This is thus the absolute obligation or absolute duty, the action that the person ought to perform.

It is frequently argued, however, that Ross should have used the term pro tanto rather than prima facie. Shelly Kagan, for example, wrote:

It may be helpful to note explicitly that in distinguishing between pro tanto and prima facie reasons I depart from the unfortunate terminology proposed by Ross, which has invited confusion and misunderstanding. I take it that – despite his misleading label – it is actually pro tanto reasons that Ross has in mind in his discussion of what he calls prima facie duties.

Explaining the difference between pro tanto and prima facie, Kagan wrote: "A pro tanto reason has genuine weight, but nonetheless may be outweighed by other considerations. Thus, calling a reason a pro tanto reason is to be distinguished from calling it a prima facie reason, which I take to involve an epistemological qualification: a prima facie reason appears to be a reason, but may actually not be a reason at all."

=== Values and intuition ===
According to Ross, self-evident intuition shows that there are four kinds of things that are intrinsically good: pleasure, knowledge, virtue and justice. Virtue refers to actions or dispositions to act from the appropriate motives, for example, from the desire to do one's duty. Justice, on the other hand, is about happiness in proportion to merit. As such, pleasure, knowledge and virtue all concern states of mind, in contrast to justice, which concerns a relation between two states of mind. These values come in degrees and are comparable with each other. Ross holds that virtue has the highest value while pleasure has the lowest value. He goes so far as to suggest that "no amount of pleasure is equal to any amount of virtue, that in fact virtue belongs to a higher order of value". Values can also be compared within each category, for example, well-grounded knowledge of general principle is more valuable than weakly grounded knowledge of isolated matters of fact.

According to Ross's intuitionism, we can know moral truths through intuition, for example, that it is wrong to lie or that knowledge is intrinsically good. Intuitions involve a direct apprehension that is not mediated by inferences or deductions: they are self-evident and therefore not in need of any additional proof. This ability is not inborn but has to be developed on the way to reaching mental maturity. But in its fully developed form, we can know moral truths just as well as we can know mathematical truths like the axioms of geometry or arithmetic. This self-evident knowledge is limited to general principles: we can come to know the prima facie duties this way but not our absolute duty in a particular situation: what we should do all things considered. All we can do is consult perception to determine which prima facie duty has the highest normative weight in this particular case, even though this usually does not amount to knowledge proper due to the complexity involved in most specific cases.

=== Criticism and influence ===
A frequent criticism of Ross's ethics is that it is unsystematic and often fails to provide clear-cut ethical answers. Another is that "moral intuitions" are not a reliable basis for ethics, because they are fallible, can vary widely from individual to individual, and are often rooted in our evolutionary past in ways that should make us suspicious of their capacity to track moral truth. Additionally there is no consideration of the consequence of the action undertaken, as with all deontological approaches.

Ross's deontological pluralism was a true innovation and provided a plausible alternative to Kantian deontology. His ethical intuitionism found few followers among his contemporaries but has seen a revival by the end of the 20th and the beginning of the 21st century. Among the philosophers influenced by The Right and the Good are Philip Stratton-Lake, Robert Audi, Michael Huemer, and C. D. Broad.

== Selected works ==
- 1908: Nicomachean Ethics. Translated by W. D. Ross. Oxford: Clarendon Press.
- 1923: Aristotle
- 1924: Aristotle's Metaphysics
- 1927: 'The Basis of Objective Judgments in Ethics'. International Journal of Ethics, 37:113–127.
- 1930: The Right and the Good
- 1936: Aristotle's Physics
- 1939: Foundations of Ethics
- 1949: Aristotle's Prior and Posterior Analytics
- 1951: Plato's Theory of Ideas
- 1954: Kant's Ethical Theory: A Commentary on the Grundlegung zur Metaphysik der Sitten, Oxford: Oxford University Press.

Academic offices
Preceded by Lancelot Ridley Phelps	Provost of Oriel College, Oxford; 1929–1947	Succeeded by George Clark
Preceded by George Stuart Gordon	Vice-Chancellor of Oxford University; 1941–1944	Succeeded by Richard Winn Livingstone
