= Disagreement =

Disagreement may refer to:

- Argument
- Disagreement (epistemology)
- Dissent
- Objection (argument)
