= Greater Philadelphia Philosophy Consortium =

The Greater Philadelphia Philosophy Consortium (the GPPC) is a nonprofit educational organization founded in 1980 serving the region around Philadelphia, Pennsylvania, including western New Jersey and northern Delaware. Its current membership includes the philosophy departments of 14 regional colleges and universities.

The GPPC states its purpose as "fostering cooperation among philosophers" and "sharing the insights and methods of philosophy with a larger public."

== History ==
Michael Krausz (the Milton C. Nahm Professor of Philosophy at Bryn Mawr College) and Joseph Margolis (the Laura H. Carnell Professor of Philosophy at Temple University) co-founded the GPPC in 1980.

The GPPC was founded to help bridge between the traditions of Anglo-American philosophy and Continental philosophy that persisted in the early 1980s. It also sought to enlarge the scope of philosophical inquiry, pursuing interdisciplinary topics in the sciences, social sciences, and other humanities.

The earliest core member institutions of the GPPC included the philosophy departments of Bryn Mawr College, the University of Pennsylvania, Temple University, and Villanova University. Each of these offers advanced degrees in philosophy and extended instructional and library access to graduate students of other GPPC member schools. Drexel University, Haverford College, La Salle University, and Swarthmore College soon joined as associated faculties, though not offering advanced degrees in philosophy. The GPPC also attracted the participation of faculty at other institutions, as well as other qualified persons in the Philadelphia region with an interest in philosophy.

Support for the GPPC during the 1980s included grants (received by Joseph Margolis) from the Pennsylvania Humanities Council, Rockefeller Foundation, Exxon Educational Foundation, and Pew Charitable Trusts (with Michael Krausz).

== Governance ==
The Consortium is currently led by a Board of Directors, which consists of one faculty representative from each member institution. The Board selects several officers from among these representatives. The GPPC also receives support from a Board of Governors, who are a mix of academics and non-academics (doctors, lawyers, business persons, etc.) who share an interest in the public role of philosophy.

The GPPC operates under the auspices of the Greater Philadelphia Human Studies Consortium, composed of colleges and universities in the Philadelphia region. The Council exists to promote interdisciplinary faculty interaction and development, including the funding of four distinct consortia.

== Member Institutions ==
The Philosophy Departments of the following institutions are current members of the GPPC:

- Bryn Mawr College
- Drexel University
- Haverford College
- La Salle University
- Pennsylvania State University
- St. Joseph’s University
- Swarthmore College
- Temple University
- The College of New Jersey
- University of Delaware
- University of Pennsylvania
- Ursinus College
- Villanova University
- West Chester University

== Conferences and Working Groups ==
The GPPC hosts a variety of conferences each year, including a Public Issues Forum and an Undergraduate Philosophy Conference. Past conference speakers include well-known recent philosophers such as Jürgen Habermas, Richard Rorty, and Stanley Cavell.

The Consortium also sponsors a variety of discussion groups and working groups. Past topics include aesthetics and theory of interpretation, philosophy and feminism, and ancient Greek philosophy. Current groups discuss epistemology, philosophy of science, philosophy of religion, Asian and comparative philosophy, as well as special topics.

== Publications ==
Several books have grown out of past proceedings and papers of GPPC conferences and discussions, published primarily by Penn State Press:

- Rationality, Relativism, and the Human Sciences. Edited by Joseph Margolis, Michael Krausz, and Richard M. Burian. Dordrecht: Martin Nijhoff, 1986.
- Foucault and the Critique of Institutions. Edited by John D. Caputo and Mark Yount. University Park: Penn State Press, 1993.
- The Quarrel Between Invariance and Flux: A Guide for Philosophers and Other Players Collected and edited by Joseph Margolis and Jacques N. Catudal. University Park: Penn State Press, 2001.
- Is There A Single Right Interpretation? Edited and with an introduction by Michael Krausz. University Park: Penn State Press, 2002.
- The Musician as Interpreter. Paul Thom. University Park: Penn State Press, 2007.
- Narrative, Emotion, and Insight. Edited by Noël Carroll and John Gibson. University Park: Penn State Press, 2011.
