= Michael Krausz =

Swiss-born American philosopher (1942–2025)

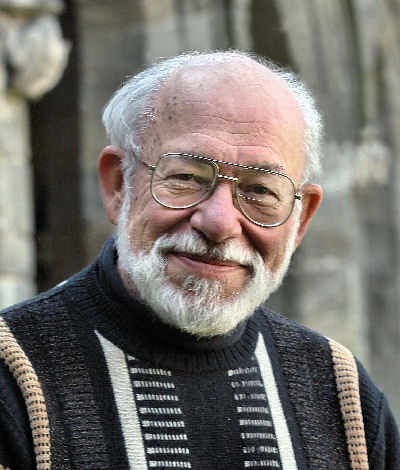
- Born: September 13, 1942; Geneva, Switzerland
- Died: May 27, 2025 (aged 82); Lewes, Delaware, U.S.

Philosophical work
- Era: Contemporary philosophy
- Region: Western philosophy
- Main interests: Interpretation, Relativism

Michael Krausz (September 13, 1942 – May 27, 2025) was a Swiss-born American philosopher as well as an artist and orchestral conductor. His philosophical works focused on the theory of interpretation, theory of knowledge, philosophy of science, philosophy of history, and philosophy of art and music. Krausz was Milton C. Nahm Professor of Philosophy at Bryn Mawr College, and he taught Aesthetics at the Curtis Institute of Music. He taught at the University of Toronto and was a visiting professor at American University, Georgetown University, Oxford University, Hebrew University of Jerusalem, American University in Cairo, University of Nairobi, Indian Institute of Advanced Study, and University of Ulm, among others. Krausz was the co-founder (with Joseph Margolis) and Chair of the fourteen-institution Greater Philadelphia Philosophy Consortium.

== Biography ==
Born on September 13, 1942, Krausz was a son of musician and artist Laszlo Krausz (1903–1979) and pianist and composer Susan Krausz (1914–2008), and he was the husband of artist Constance Costigan.

Krausz earned a PhD from University of Toronto, including post-graduate work at Linacre College, Oxford University. He was a Special Student at the London School of Economics, and holds a BA from Rutgers University and an MA from Indiana University. His notable teachers included Sir Isaiah Berlin, William Dray, Patrick Gardiner, Rom Harré, Sir Karl Popper, and John Oulton Wisdom. He was also influenced by R.G. Collingwood, Joseph Margolis and Bimal Krishna Matilal.

Krausz served as series editor for a number of publications, including Brill Publishers Series in Philosophy of History and Culture, Rowman and Littlefield Publishers Series on Philosophy and the Global Context, Rodopi Publishers Series on Interpretation and Translation, and Penn State University Press Series of the Greater Philadelphia Philosophy Consortium. He died on May 27, 2025, at the age of 82, at his home in Lewes, Delaware, after a long illness.

== Works ==
=== Philosophy ===
I. Ideals and Aims of Interpretation. Michael Krausz’s interests in the theory of interpretation addressed the following cluster of questions. For such cultural phenomena as works of art, music, literature, and the self, can a single admissible interpretation exist? Or, for such phenomena, can a multiplicity of admissible interpretations exist? For such phenomena, can opposing interpretations be jointly defended? Does interpretive activity affect the nature and number of that which is interpreted? Does interpretation aim for the elucidation of its objects, the edification of its interpreters, or both? How does the question of singularity or multiplicity of admissible interpretations bear on the singularity or multiplicity of life paths and projects?

Singularism asserts that objects of interpretation always answer to one and only one ideal interpretation. In contrast, multiplism asserts that objects of interpretation may answer to more than one opposed interpretation. Both singularism and multiplism require that competing interpretations address one and the same object of interpretation. Where different interpretations address different objects of interpretation, an innocuous pluralism occurs. Where objects of interpretation cannot be delineated as to number, neither singularism nor multiplism can apply.

Krausz probed the relation between these ideals of interpretation and their ontologies. Singularism and multiplism are each compatible with either realism or constructivism. Singularism does not uniquely entail realism (and vice versa) and multiplism does not uniquely entail constructivism (and vice versa). Orthodox combinations include singularist-realism and multiplist-constructivism. Heterodox combinations include singularist-constructivism and multiplist-realism.

Krausz affirmed that the contest between singularism and multiplism is logically detachable from the contest between realism and constructivism. He further showed that the contest between singularism and multiplism is detachable from a range of other ontologies that fall under the reconciliatory heading of “constructive realism.” None of the ontologies in Krausz’s inventory of constructive realisms uniquely entails either singularism or multiplism (and vice versa). Yet Krausz denied that his “detachability thesis” demonstrates that ontology as such is unnecessary for the theory of interpretation. For the question of the countability of objects of interpretation as well as interpretations themselves is ontological. Krausz extended the notion of ideals of interpretation to ideals of life paths or projects, such as self-realization. That is, directional singularism is the view that for a given person there is one admissible life path, and directional multiplism is the view that for a given person there may be more than one admissible life path. He developed the idea of directional multiplism from a non-essentialist or non-foundational view of human nature.

II. Relativism. In addition, Krausz’s work on relativism canvassed the range and significance of relativistic doctrines and rehearsed their virtues and vices. He considered relativism as the claim that truth, goodness, or beauty (among other values) is relative to some reference frame, and no absolute standards to adjudicate between reference frames exist. He defined and differentiated various strands of absolutism: realism, universalism and foundationalism. Krausz argued that when these strands of absolutism are unwoven, and when relativism is understood as the negation of these strands, classical self-refutation arguments against relativism do not apply. In turn, Krausz considered whether the idea of “undifferentiated unity” survives the relativist challenge. He suggested that the assertion of undifferentiated unity, instanced for example in some Asian soteriologies, is compatible with relativism as here he defined it.

=== Music ===
Michael Krausz was the founding Artistic Director and Conductor of the Great Hall Chamber Orchestra at Bryn Mawr. The GHCO is composed of 42 young professional and conservatory musicians, and has collaborated with principal players of the New York Philharmonic and Philadelphia Orchestra as soloists. Krausz studied violin with Cleveland Orchestra concertmaster Josef Gingold. He received his early conducting coaching from his father, Laszlo Krausz, noted violist with l'Orchestre de la Suisse Romande and the Cleveland Orchestra, and conductor of the Akron Symphony Orchestra. Frederik Prausnitz of the Peabody Conservatory, and Luis Biava, Resident Conductor Laureate of the Philadelphia Orchestra also coached Michael Krausz. Krausz was a guest conductor of professional orchestras in Bulgaria, including the Pleven, Vratsa and Plovdiv Philharmonic Orchestras.

=== Art ===
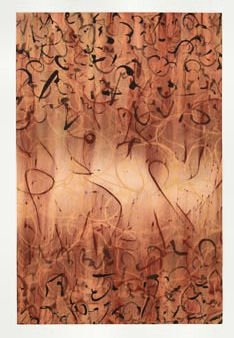
End of Texts 35"x26"

Michael Krausz had thirty-three solo and duo shows in galleries in the U.S., U.K., and India, and he participated in many group exhibitions. He was elected Fellow of the Royal Society of Arts (F.R.S.A.) in 1973. Krausz studied at the Philadelphia College of Art and Haystack Mountain School of Crafts. He was Resident Fellow at the Ossabaw Foundation. Krausz's artworks were reproduced in numerous publications including the British journal, Leonardo. He was a member of Artist's Exchange, DE, and Delaware by Hand, which, in 2009, awarded him the status of “Master.”

Krausz's paintings depicted various spatial planes at once, embodying scripted messages of no literal significance. They were concerned with the emergence and dissolution of ciphers in infinite spaces. The works embodied a kind of automatic writing arising from conductorial musical gestures in meditative spaces. The paintings were done with dry pigment on museum board and other mixed media

== Bibliography ==
Major works

- Rightness and Reasons: Interpretation in Cultural Practices, Ithaca, N.Y.: Cornell University Press, 1993.
- Varieties of Relativism, (with Rom Harré), Oxford: Basil Blackwell Publishers, 1996.
- Limits of Rightness, Lanham, Md.: Rowman and Littlefield Publishers, 2000.
- Interpretation and Transformation: Explorations in Art and the Self, Amsterdam: Rodopi Publishers, 2007.
- Dialogues on Relativism, Absolutism, and Beyond: Four Days in India, Lanham, Md.: Rowman and Littlefield, 2011.
- Oneness and the Displacement of Self: Dialogues on Self-Realization, Amsterdam: Rodopi, 2013.

Volumes edited

- Critical Essays on the Philosophy of R. G. Collingwood. Oxford: Clarendon Press, 1972.
- The Concept of Creativity in Science and Art (with Denis Dutton). The Hague: Martinus Nijhoff Publishers, 1981.
- Relativism: Cognitive and Moral (with Jack W. Meiland). Notre Dame, Ind.: Notre Dame University Press, 1982.
- Rationality, Relativism, and the Human Sciences (with Joseph Margolis and Richard Burian). The Hague: Martinus Nijhoff Publishers, 1986.
- Relativism: Interpretation and Confrontation. Notre Dame, Ind.: Notre Dame University Press, 1989.
- Jewish Identity (with David Goldberg). Philadelphia, Pa.: Temple University Press, 1993.
- The Interpretation of Music: Philosophical Essays. Oxford: Clarendon Press, 1993.
- Interpretation, Relativism, and the Metaphysics of Culture: Themes in the Philosophy of Joseph Margolis (with Richard Shusterman). Amherst, N.Y.: Humanity Press, 1999.
- Is There A Single Right Interpretation? University Park, Pa.: Penn State University Press, 2002.
- The Idea of Creativity (with Denis Dutton and Karen Bardsley). Amsterdam: Brill Publishers, 2009.
- Relativism: A Contemporary Anthology. New York: Columbia University Press, 2010.

Secondary sources

- Andreea Deciu Ritivoi, ed., Interpretation and Its Objects: Studies in the Philosophy of Michael Krausz. (This Festschrift includes replies by Michael Krausz to scholars from the U.S., England, Germany, India, Japan, and Australia.) Amsterdam: Rodopi, 2003
