= Alethiology =

Study of the nature of truth

Alethiology (or alethology, "the study of aletheia") literally means the study of truth, but can more accurately be translated as the study of the nature of truth.

== History ==
Scholars debate whether alethiology is synonymous with epistemology, the study of knowledge, and whether or not dividing the two is mere semantics, but sometimes a distinction is made. Epistemology is the study of knowledge and its acquisition. Alethiology is specifically concerned with the nature of truth, which is only one of the areas studied by epistemologists.

The term alethiology is rare. The ten-volume Routledge Encyclopedia of Philosophy mentions it only once, in the article "Lambert, Johann Heinrich (1728–77)":

"Part Two of the Neues Organon is the 'Alethiology or Doctrine of Truth'. Lambert’s key concern here is with the nature and function of the simple concepts that serve as the building blocks for the logical construction of true propositions."

The Encyclopædia Britannica Eleventh Edition describes the discipline as "…an uncommon expression for the doctrine of truth, used by Sir William Hamilton in his philosophic writings when treating of the rules for the discrimination of truth and error."

The term appears in Karen L. Carr's The Banalization of Nihilism in contrast to several other types of nihilism, especially epistemological nihilism. The views of several philosophers are then distinguished by reference to 'alethiological nihilism', 'epistemological nihilism' and the like.

== See also ==
- Criteria of truth
- Theories of truth
