= Chosen people =

Religious term

Throughout history, various groups of people have seen themselves as the chosen people of a deity, for a particular purpose. The phenomenon of "chosen people" is well known among the Israelites and Jews, where the term (Hebrew: עם סגולה / העם הנבחר, romanized: am segulah / ha-am ha-nivhar) refers to the Israelites as being selected by Yahweh to worship only him and to fulfill the mission of proclaiming his truth throughout the world. Some claims of chosenness are based on parallel claims of Israelite ancestry, as is the case for the Christian Identity and Black Hebrew Israelite sects—both which regard themselves (and not Jews) as the "true Israel". Others see the concept as spiritual, whereby individuals who genuinely believe in God are considered to be the "true" chosen people, "the elect". This view is common among many Christian denominations which historically believed that the church replaced Israel as the people of God.

Anthropologists commonly regard claims of chosenness as a form of ethnocentrism.

The concept of a people favoured or selected by God—summarizable in slogans such as Gott mit uns—can feed into generalised nationalism.

== Judaism ==
In Judaism, "chosenness" is the belief that the Jews, via descent from the ancient Israelites, are the chosen people—i.e., chosen to be in a covenant with God. The idea of the Israelites being chosen by God is found most directly in the Book of Deuteronomy, where it is applied to Israel at Mount Sinai upon the condition of their acceptance of the Mosaic covenant between themselves and God. The decalogue immediately follows, and the seventh-day Sabbath is given as the sign of the covenant, with a requirement that Israel keep it, or else be cut off. The verb 'bahar (בָּחַ֣ר (Hebrew)), and is alluded to elsewhere in the Hebrew Bible using other terms such as "holy people". Much is written about these topics in rabbinic literature. The three largest Jewish denominations—Orthodox Judaism, Conservative Judaism and Reform Judaism—maintain the belief that the Jews have been chosen by God for a purpose. Sometimes, this choice is seen as charging the Jewish people with a specific mission—to be a light unto the nations, and to exemplify the covenant with God as described in the Torah. This is first prominently outlined in Genesis 12:2: "And I will make of thee a great nation, and I will bless thee, and make thy name great; and thou shalt be a blessing."

While the concept of "chosenness" may be misunderstood by some to connote ethnic supremacy — as sometimes implied in the hoary formulation "chosen race" — Conservative Judaism denies this, as it claims that as a result of being chosen, Jews also bear the greatest responsibility, which incurs the most severe punishment upon disobedience.

"Few beliefs have been subject to as much misunderstanding as the 'Chosen People' doctrine. The Torah and the Prophets clearly stated that this does not imply any innate Jewish superiority. In the words of Amos (3:2) 'You alone have I singled out of all the families of the earth—that is why I will call you to account for your iniquities.' The Torah tells us that we are to be "a kingdom of priests and a holy nation" with obligations and duties which flowed from our willingness to accept this status. Far from being a license for special privilege, it entailed additional responsibilities not only toward God but to our fellow human beings. As expressed in the blessing at the reading of the Torah, our people have always felt it to be a privilege to be selected for such a purpose. For the modern traditional Jew, the doctrine of the election and the covenant of Israel offers a purpose for Jewish existence which transcends its own self interests. It suggests that because of our special history and unique heritage we are in a position to demonstrate that a people that takes seriously the idea of being covenanted with God can not only thrive in the face of oppression, but can be a source of blessing to its children and its neighbors. It obligates us to build a just and compassionate society throughout the world and especially in the land of Israel where we may teach by example what it means to be a 'covenant people, a light unto the nations.'"

Likewise, Rabbi Lord Immanuel Jakobovits views the concept of "chosenness" as God choosing different nations, and by extension individuals, to perform unique contributions to the world, similar to the concept of division of labor.

"Yes, I do believe that the chosen people concept as affirmed by Judaism in its holy writ, its prayers, and its millennial tradition. In fact, I believe that every people—and indeed, in a more limited way, every individual—is "chosen" or destined for some distinct purpose in advancing the designs of Providence. Only, some fulfill their mission and others do not. Maybe the Greeks were chosen for their unique contributions to art and philosophy, the Romans for their pioneering services in law and government, the British for bringing parliamentary rule into the world, and the Americans for piloting democracy in a pluralistic society. The Jews were chosen by God to be 'peculiar unto Me' as the pioneers of religion and morality; that was and is their national purpose."

== Christianity ==
In Christianity, there are two distinct concepts about the idea of God's chosen people: one is the adoption of the fact stated in the Hebrew Bible, the base of the Christian Old Testament, that the Israelites (later: the Jews) are the divinely chosen people; and the second, that by rejecting the messiahship and divinity of Jesus, the Jews have lost this attribute, being replaced by those who have recognised Jesus as the Saviour and God incarnate, this approach being known as Supersessionism. The two concepts may appear mixed together in different ways among the various Christian denominations.

=== Christian Identity ===
Christian Identity is a belief which holds the view that only either Germanic, Anglo-Saxon, Celtic, Nordic, or Aryan people and those of kindred blood are the descendants of Abraham, Isaac and Jacob and hence the descendants of the ancient Israelites.

Independently practiced by individuals, independent congregations, and some prison gangs, it is not an organized religion, nor is it connected with specific Christian denominations. Its theology promotes a racial interpretation of Christianity. Christian Identity beliefs were primarily developed and promoted by American authors who regarded Europeans as the "chosen people" and Jews as the cursed offspring of Cain, the "serpent hybrid" or serpent seed, a belief known as the two-seedline doctrine. White supremacist sects and gangs later adopted many of these teachings.

Christian Identity holds that all non-whites (people not of wholly European descent) will either be exterminated or enslaved in order to serve the white race in the new Heavenly Kingdom on Earth under the reign of Jesus Christ. Its doctrine states that only "Adamic" (white) people can achieve salvation and paradise.

=== Mormonism ===
In Mormonism, all Latter Day Saints are viewed as covenant, or chosen, people because they have accepted the name of Jesus Christ through the ordinance of baptism. In contrast to supersessionism, Latter Day Saints do not dispute the "chosen" status of the Jewish people. Most practicing Mormons receive a patriarchal blessing that includes a lineage in the House of Israel. This lineage may be blood related or through "adoption"; therefore, a child may not necessarily share the lineage of their parents (but will still be a member of the tribes of Israel). It is a widely held belief that most members of the faith are in the tribe of Ephraim or the tribe of Manasseh.

== Mandaeism ==
Mandaeans formally refer to themselves as Nasurai (Nasoraeans), meaning guardians or possessors of secret rites and knowledge. Another early self-appellation is bhiri zidqa meaning 'elect of righteousness' or 'the chosen righteous', a term found in the Book of Enoch and Genesis Apocryphon II, 4.

== Maasai religion ==
The traditional religion of the Maasai people from East Africa maintains that the Supreme God Ngai has chosen them to herd all cattle in the world, and this belief has been used to justify stealing from other ethnic groups.

== Rastafari ==
Based on Jewish biblical tradition and Ethiopian legend via Kebra Nagast, Rastas believe that Israel's King Solomon, together with Ethiopian Queen of Sheba, conceived a child which began the Solomonic line of kings in Ethiopia, rendering the Ethiopian people as the true children of Israel, and thereby chosen. Reinforcement of this belief occurred when Beta Israel, Ethiopia's ancient Israelite First Temple community, were rescued from Sudanese famine and brought to Israel during Operation Moses in 1985.

== Unification Church ==
Sun Myung Moon taught that Korea is the chosen nation, selected to serve a divine mission and was "chosen by God to be the birthplace of the leading figure of the age" and was the birthplace of "Heavenly Tradition", ushering in God's kingdom.

== See also ==
- 144,000
- Christ of Europe
- Exceptionalism
- One true church
- Religiocentrism
- The Chosen One (trope)
- Theocracy
- White nationalism
