= Conciliationism =

View in the epistemology of disagreement

Conciliationism is a view in the epistemology of disagreement according to which one should revise one's opinions closer to one's epistemic peers in the face of epistemic disagreement. Nathan Ballantyne and E.J. Coffman define the view as follows:

Conciliationism: In a revealed peer disagreement over P, each thinker should give at least some weight to her peer’s attitude. That is, each thinker’s confidence should change to some extent: neither thinker is justified in staying exactly as confident as she initially was regarding whether P.

Philosopher David Christensen has been a prominent defender of this view. Others have argued in its favor as well. Some have discussed the implications of this view for religious belief.

A standard objection is that conciliationism is self-undermining because most philosophers do not accept it. A number of responses have been offered. A second objection is that if a person encounters multiple people who disagree, and applies conciliationism serially, the procedure violates commutativity. The order that the person encounters the other people affects her resultant doxastic state.
