= Karen L. Carr =

American scholar

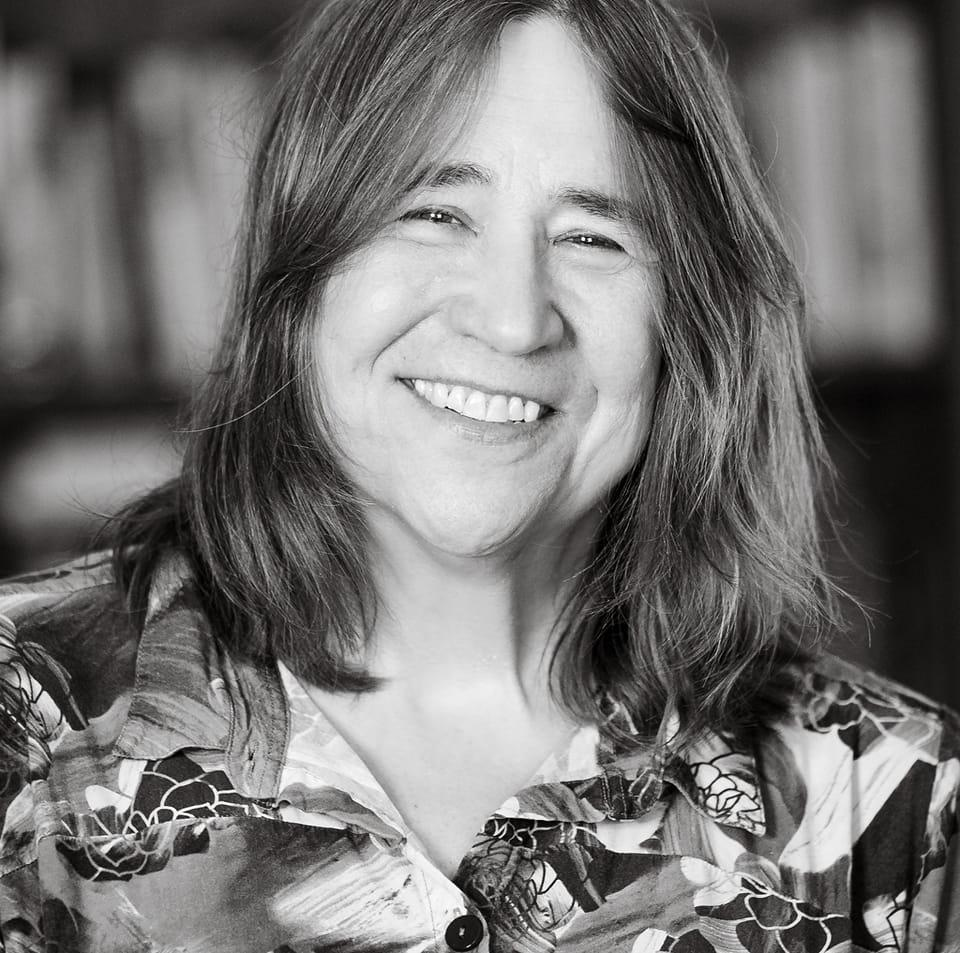
- Professor Karen L. Carr

Philosophical work
- Era: Contemporary philosophy
- Region: Western philosophy
- School: Continental
- Main interests: nihilism, alethiology

Karen Leslie Carr is an American scholar and McNaughton Rosebush Professor of Liberal Studies and Professor of Religious Studies at Lawrence University. She is known for her works on nihilism and philosophy of religion.

== Bibliography ==
- The Banalization of Nihilism: Twentieth-Century Responses to Meaninglessness, SUNY Press, 1992
- The Sense Of Antirationalism: The Religious Thought Of Zhuangzi And Kierkegaard, with Philip J. Ivanhoe, CreateSpace, 2010
- The birth, baptism, and banalization ... 1988, c. 1989
