= Jack Meiland =

American philosopher

Jack W. Meiland (1934–1998) was an American philosopher and educator. As a philosopher, Meiland is best known for his analyses of relativism, particularly on cognitive relativism. Meiland is also known for a "salvage operation" from the "paradox of relativism", the claim that relativists are absolutists about relativism.

From 1962 to 1997, Meiland taught at the Philosophy Department at the University of Michigan, where he was appointed Arthur F. Thurnau Professor in 1988.

In the College of Literature, Science, and the Arts (LS&A), Meiland served as Director of the Honors Program and then as the Associate Dean for Curriculum and Long-Range Planning.

== Works ==
- Scepticism and Historical Knowledge (1965)
- Talking About Particulars (1970)
- Nature of Intention (1970)
- First Time in London (1979)
- College Thinking: How to Get the Best Out of College (1981)
- Relativism, Cognitive and Moral (1982), editor with Michael Krausz

== See also ==
- American philosophy
- List of American philosophers
