= David Christensen (philosopher) =

American philosopher

Education
- Education: UCLA (PhD)

Philosophical work
- Era: 21st-century philosophy
- Region: Western philosophy
- Institutions: University of Vermont, Brown University
- Main interests: epistemology
- Notable ideas: conciliationism

David Christensen is an American philosopher and professor of philosophy at Brown University. His main interest is epistemology, in which he is a leading proponent of conciliationism. He has also made important contributions in confirmation theory, epistemic justification and evidence, theories of rationality, and the role of logic for a theory of rationality. Christensen's professional accolades include the 2017-2018 Sanders Lecture and the 2021 Ernest Sosa Prize Lecture, both awarded by the American Philosophical Association for his distinguished contributions to epistemology. He is an editor of Mind (journal).
