= Religiocentrism =

Belief that one's religion is more important than other religions

Religiocentrism or religio-centrism is defined as the "conviction that a person's own religion is more important or superior to other religions."

== Terminology ==
The neologism religiocentrism combines religio- (e.g., religiophobia) and -centrism (e.g., Eurocentrism). Derivations include religiocentric or religio-centric.

Although the precise origins of religiocentrism and religiocentric remain unclear, the words have been used since the early 20th century. The American economist Adrian Augustus Holtz described how early German school reforms were "carried on in a way that allowed for a religio-centric educational system." Sinclair Lewis's Main Street said, "Maud Dyer was neurotic, religiocentric, faded; her emotions were moist, and her figure was unsystematic."

The related term Christocentric theologically means "forms of Christianity that concentrate on the teaching of Jesus Christ", but is sometimes used as a near synonym of religiocentric. For instance "No matter where it appears, government-sponsored Christocentrism, or even religiocentrism, undermines this nation's ideals."

== Academic studies ==
Religiocentrism is commonly discussed in contexts of psychology, sociology, and anthropology.

The Australian social psychologists John J. Ray and Dianne Doratis defined religiocentrism.

"Ethnocentrism" is the social scientist's value-neutral term for ethnic or racial prejudice. It refers to ethnically-based sentiments of exclusiveness without any implication of their moral worth or justifiability... By analogy, the term religiocentrism is derived here to mean religiously based sentiments of exclusiveness—beliefs that one should marry within one's own religion, work with members of one's own religion, and in general prefer members of one's own religion above others. This will also entail ipso facto devaluative judgments of other religions.

Ray and Doratis designed a groundbreaking attitude scale to measure religiocentrism and ethnocentrism. Their religiocentrism scale comprises 33 items (for instance, "I think my religion is nearer to the truth than any other" and "Most Moslems, Buddhists and Hindus are very stupid and ignorant"), with five-point Likert scale psychometric response options from "Strongly agree" (Scored 5) to "Strongly disagree" (1). To verify internal consistency among respondents, 11 items were reverse scored ("It makes no difference to me what religion my friends are" is the converse of "I think that it's better if you stick to friends of the same religion as your own"), resulting in a reliability coefficient of .88 among 154 first-year university students. The authors tested attitudes among Australian fifth-form students in two Catholic and two public schools, and discovered that neither ethnocentrism nor religiocentrism showed any correlation with religious background. Ray and Doratis concluded, "Ethnocentrism, religiocentrism and religious conservatism were all shown to be separate and distinct factors of attitudes in their own right. They are not just three aspects of the one thing. Religiocentric people do however tend to be both religiously conservative and ethnocentric."

The Hungarian-Jewish historian and anthropologist Raphael Patai mentions religiocentrism as a variable in relationships between religion and culture,

Each religion also has a definite outlook on its own value in relation to that of other religions. Its relationship to other religions may range from complete toleration to the complete lack of it, with a corresponding range of self-evaluation. This variable, best called religio-centrism (on the analogy of ethnocentrism), can serve as an additional avenue of approach to the study of our subject.

Comparing Middle Eastern, Far Eastern, and Western cultures, Patai finds,

Religion in the Far East is characterized by the absence of religio-centrism: there is a marked toleration of other religions and a mutual borrowing and influencing; in the Middle East and in the West there is a high degree of religio-centrism, with intolerance and scorn of other religions: each religion is exclusive and regards itself as the "one and only" true faith.

In a later survey of the potentials for world peace, Patai differentiated the major modern religions between "theistic" and "nontheistic".

The three great monotheistic religions of the Middle East and the West, Judaism, Christianity, and Islam, are the foremost theistic religions and the dominant faiths of about one half of mankind. Common to all theistic religions is a pronounced religiocentrism, expressed most poignantly in the conviction that one's own religion is the one and only true one, and that all the other faiths are erroneous and hence depreciable. In this conviction were rooted the great religious wars which pitted, not only Muslims against Christians, but also various Muslim sects against one another, and likewise made various Christian denominations bitter enemies... The situation is more hopeful in the great nontheistic religions of South, Southeast, and East Asia. These religions, notably Hinduism, Buddhism, Jainism, Sikhism, Confucianism, and Taoism, lack the element of self-assurance and certainty that each is the exclusive possessor of the only truth.

In response, Andrew Wilson, Professor of Scriptural Studies of the Unification Theological Seminary, criticized Patai's opinion as theologically plausible but historically erroneous, citing examples of "rampant communal violence between Hindus and Buddhists in Sri Lanka and between Sikhs and Hindus in India."

Religiocentrism has a specialized meaning for sociologists. "This term is related to a common word used in sociological literature, ethnocentrism. Similarly, we might refer to feelings of rightness and superiority resulting from religious affiliation as religiocentrism. Religiocentrism inhibits the ability of a society to achieve adaptation, integration and goal-attainment."

Mohammed Abu-Nimer, the Director of the Peacebuilding and Development Institute at American University, distinguishes between religiocentrism and "religiorelativism".

A religiorelative person is firm in his/her belief that other religions have the right to exist and be practiced, even if such norms and beliefs are contradictory to one's own set of religious beliefs. Such a person is prone not to engage in violence or discriminatory actions against the others. In contrast, a religiocentric person is a believer who denies other religions' "truth" and who holds an absolute truth that leaves no room for different religious practices. Such a person becomes more prone to dehumanize, exclude, and discriminate against other religious groups and individuals. Often, as a result of negative and destructive exposure and experience with conflict and war, religiocentric beliefs not only are exacerbated and easily translated into violence against the enemy (that is, the different other), but also actually grow and prohibit human and peaceful contact with the other. However, there are conflict resolution and peace-building activities and forums that can assist peace workers in such settings to transform a religiocentric into a religiorelative believer.

Abu-Nimer analyzes three typical reactions of a religiocentric person to another religion: denial, defense mechanisms ("There is no salvation outside the Church"), and minimization ("We are all the children of God").

== See also ==
- Chosen people
- Egocentrism
- Ethnocentrism
- God complex
- Nationalism
- Patriotism
- Relativism
- Sociology
- Religious pluralism
- Exceptionalism
- Supremacism
- Secularism
- Separation of church and state
