= Uniqueness thesis (epistemology) =

Epistemological thesis

The uniqueness thesis is “the idea that a body of evidence justifies at most one proposition out of a competing set of propositions (e.g., one theory out of a bunch of exclusive alternatives) and that it justifies at most one attitude toward any particular proposition.” The types of attitudes towards a proposition, are: believing, disbelieving, and suspending judgment. The uniqueness thesis claims that, given a body of evidence, one of these attitudes is the rationally justified one. The justification referred to in this thesis is epistemic justification.

Stewart Cohen, following Christensen, suggests an alternative interpretation of ‘attitude’. Attitude is described by credence, which is the degree of belief in a certain proposition, also referred to as subjective bayesian probability”.

The denial of the Uniqueness Thesis is also referred to as “Permissivism”

== Controversy ==
The uniqueness thesis is false for some epistemic views. For example, it is obviously false for deontological justification, since the same belief may be justified for one person (e.g., who has limited cognitive capabilities) and not justified for another. It is also false for relativistic views of truth. On the other hand, it is obviously true for a belief that results from deductive reasoning under truth conducive conception.

Kopec and Titlebaum describe the controversy over this thesis as follows: “The debates over Uniqueness raise a number of very puzzling issues. In our experience, the thesis seems so obviously true to some philosophers, and so obviously false to others, that many don't believe the issue is worth arguing over. But if the fact of the matter is so obvious, then why is it so very difficult for Uniqueness defenders to devise an argument that can convince the permissivists to accept Uniqueness? And, similarly, why is it so very difficult for permissivists to devise a counterexample that can convince Uniqueness defenders to abandon it?
