= Therapeutic nihilism =

View that medical treatment is futile

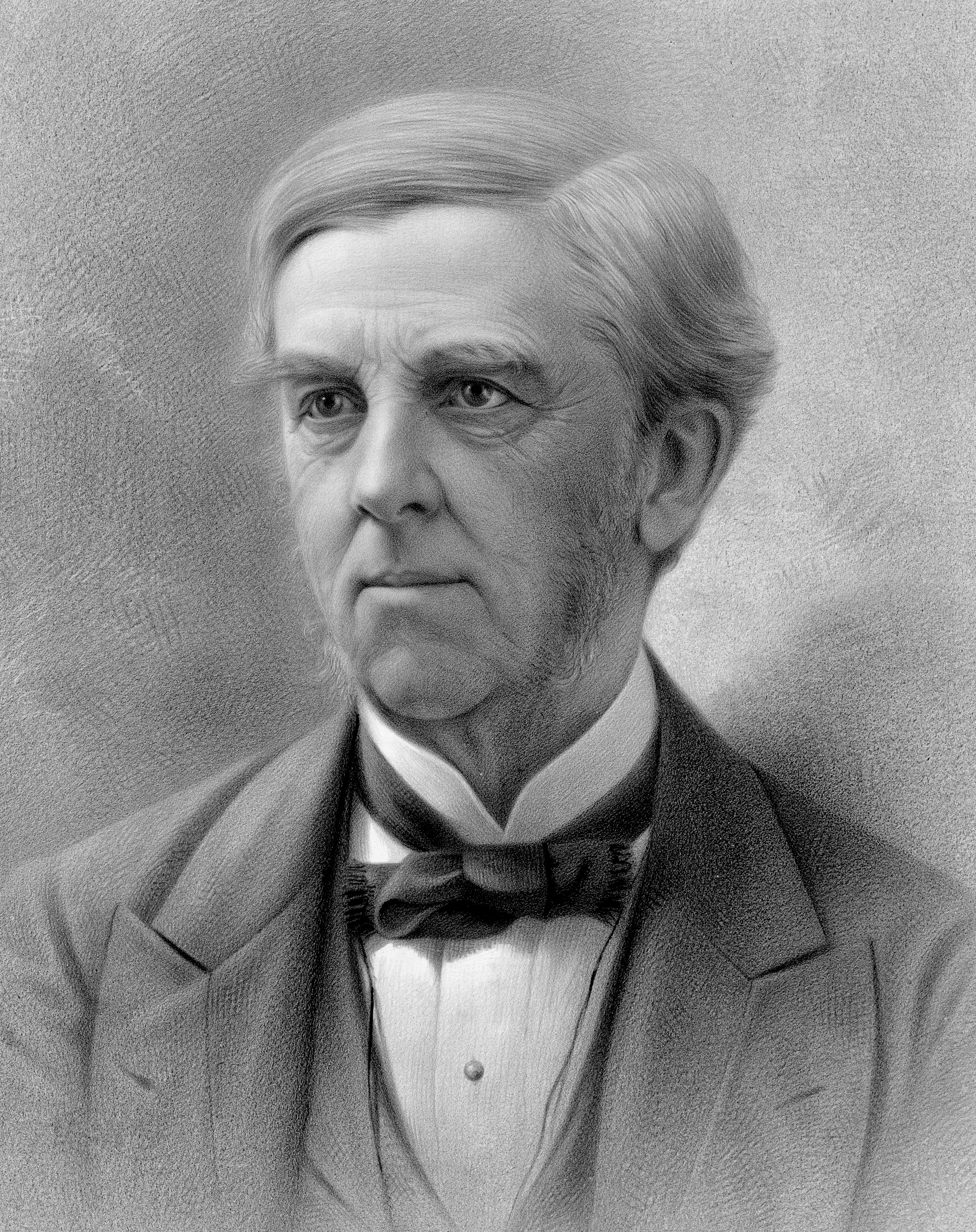
In the 19th century, there was a lack of confidence in the remedies of the day. Oliver Wendell Holmes said, "...if the whole materia medica, as now used, could be sunk to the bottom of the sea, it would be so much the better for mankind – and all the worse for the fishes."

Therapeutic nihilism is the contention that it is impossible to cure people or societies of their ills through treatment. Another definition stems from William M. Johnston's cultural history of the late Austrian double monarchy: Indifference to political and social reform.

In medicine, it was connected to the idea that many "cures" do more harm than good, and that one should instead encourage the body to heal itself. Michel de Montaigne espoused this view in his Essais in 1580. This position was later popular, among other places, in France in the 1820s and 1830s, but has mostly faded away in the modern era due to the development of provably effective medicines such as antibiotics.

== History ==
Around the late 19th century, therapeutic nihilism gained some prominence among medical professionals. Proponents of this view claimed that every man should be his own physician through democratization of knowledge. Cultural critic Matthew Arnold was quoted as saying that "the stream of tendency of modern medical thought was toward a therapeutic nihilism."

The most preferred approach to medicine at the time was what was sometimes called active medication, in which therapies were given acutely and would be expected to have dramatic effects. Active medication represented, to some degree, the cutting edge of existing medical thought, which also led to assumptions and inaccuracies. For example, when cocaine was first discovered, it was described in medical literature to be useful in conditions ranging from gastralgia, to childbirth (as a local anaesthetic), to migraine, to shingles, to nasal hemorrhage (due to its vasoconstrictive properties). This was in contrast to routine therapy, where the patient took the same medication consistently. Culturally, doctors were considered heroic figures when active medication worked while unsuccessful cases could be labeled as unfortunate and dismissed. Robert Bartholow, a contemporary physician, said "the science of therapeutics should be made more certain" and that the "true knowledge of drug action is not widely enough diffused." When faced with everyday exigencies, many physicians were left clueless. The medical community shared these concerns: in 1888, the president of the American Medical Association was quoted as saying that there were "odious defects in the American medical education system" and expressed concern that the ratio of medical practitioners to the US population (1 per 580 persons) was both excessive relative to actual need, and founded on a plethora of low-quality graduates of lower-quality medical schools who were looking only for an income, leading to supply-driven overuse of medical therapy.

Therapeutic nihilism slowly faded in the 19th century as systematic reform of the medical education system took place, then reappeared in the 20th century in a slightly different fashion than prior. The aggressive empiricism of the 19th century enlightened the medical society of the need to thoroughly evaluate every aspect of clinical practice. Prior to the publication of rigorous research later in the 20th century, some physicians believed the most potent weapon for treatment was not medication, but the regulation of bodily secretions such as bloodletting, promotion of perspiration, or urination to regain the natural state of equilibrium. Ivan Illich was one of the ardent supporters of therapeutic nihilism. In his book Medical Nemesis, Illich claimed that the great increase in life expectancy and public health experienced in his era was due to improved nutrition and sanitation, rather than innovation in drugs and medicines. He also believed there was an excess of physicians, surgeries and prescriptions. Therapeutic nihilists claimed such excess often led to malpractice and increase in iatrogenic (doctor-caused) injuries, accusing the physicians of creating even more illnesses.

Therapeutic nihilism mostly faded by the mid-20th century, and some researchers have concluded that "therapeutic nihilism was replaced by an armamentarium of therapeutic inventions."

The phrase therapeutic nihilism is included in a modern version of the Hippocratic Oath, traditionally taken by physicians upon graduation, "... I will apply for the benefit of the sick, all measures [that] are required, avoiding those twin traps of over-treatment and therapeutic nihilism."

== See also ==
- Qigong boom – Chinese religious movement
