= Disagreement (epistemology) =

Peer issue

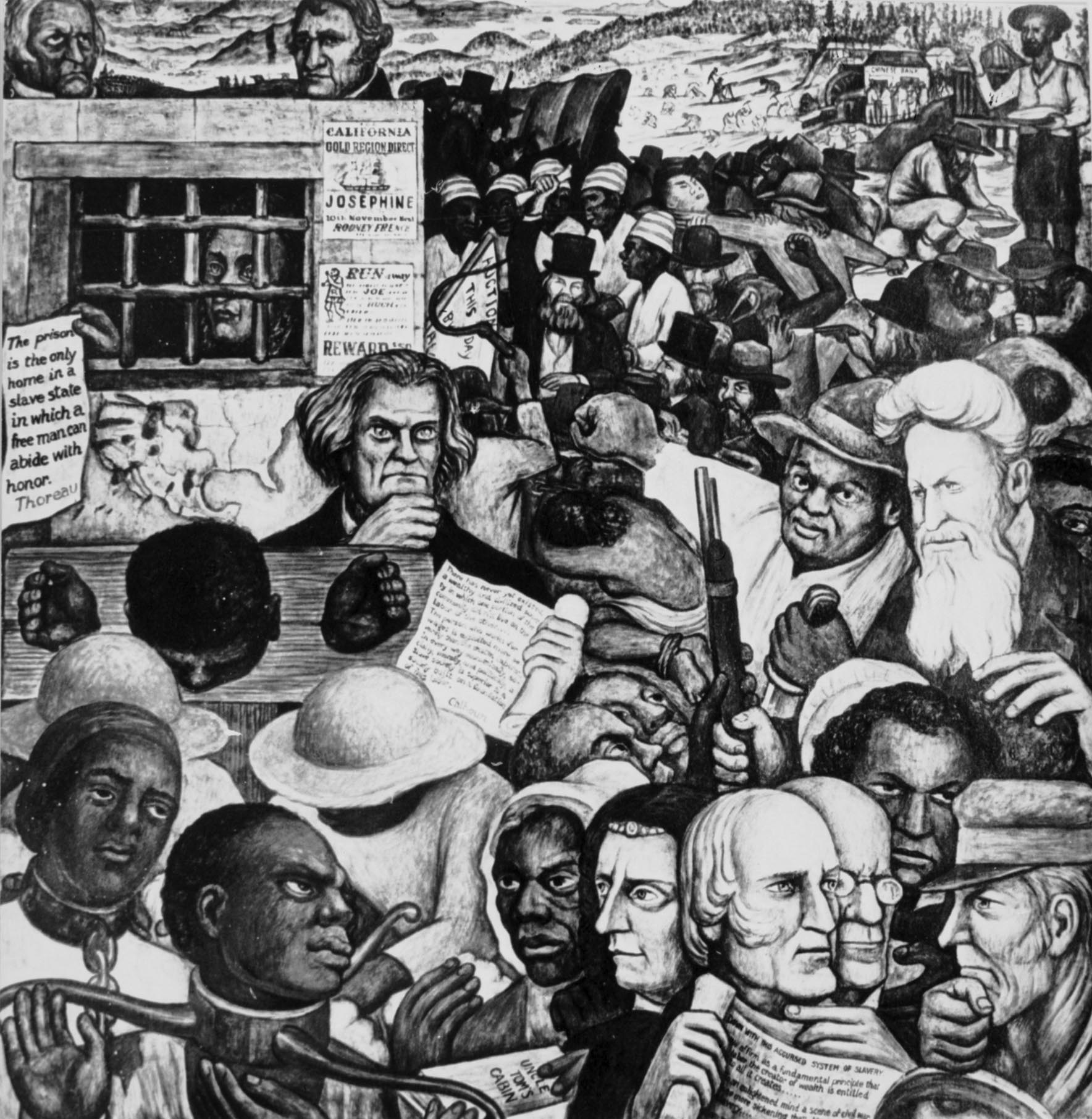
Panel from Diego Rivera's mural at Unity House, depicting the growing conflict over slavery that eventually led to the Civil War

The issue of peer disagreement in epistemology discusses the question of how a person should respond when he learns that somebody else with the same body of knowledge disagrees with them.

== Types of disagreements ==
Epistemologists distinguish between two types of disagreements. One type is disagreements about facts. For instance, a disagreement about the question whether earth is spherical or flat. The second type of disagreements is about a proposed course of action, for example, whether one should travel to Italy or Greece.

This philosophical discussion is mainly about “peer disagreement”. This is the case where the two disputants are epistemic peers -- they have roughly the same capabilities in terms of information and intelligence.

== Responses to disagreements ==
The schools of thought about the right way to respond to a disagreement are the Conciliatory School and the Steadfast school. Different philosophers provide different reasons for each of these schools.

=== The Conciliatory School ===
Conciliationism contends that a person must consider his peer belief as equally valid as his own. Consequently, he must respond by revising his own belief, taking into account his peer belief. The options are to attribute equal weight to each belief and meet in the middle. There are disagreements, like belief and disbelief in God, where this is not possible. In these cases the right response is to suspend one's own belief.

=== The Steadfast School ===
This school contends that a person must adhere to his own original belief notwithstanding his knowledge of a disagreeing peer. One given reason is that although from a third person perspective both disputants are likely to be correct, from one's own perspective, a person should trust himself.

Another given reason is related to the dispute over the Uniqueness Thesis. According to those who deny the Uniqueness Thesis, there are cases where two contradictory beliefs are justified. Therefore, the fact that there exists contradictory belief does not necessarily entail that one of the beliefs is not justified. Consequently, the existence of a disagreement does not necessarily require any of the disputants to change his belief.
