= Joseph Margolis =

American philosopher (1924–2021)

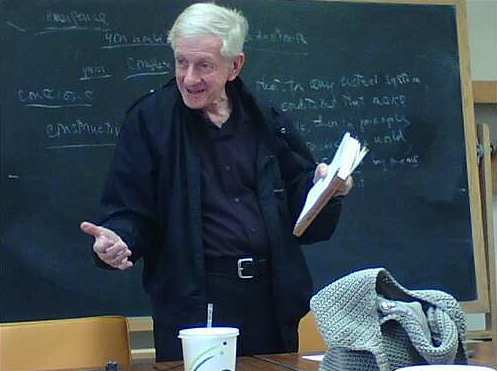
- Margolis at Temple University, 2007
- Born: Joseph Zalman Margolis; May 16, 1924; Newark, New Jersey, U.S.
- Died: June 8, 2021 (aged 97); Philadelphia, Pennsylvania, U.S.

Education
- Education: Drew University (BA); Columbia University (MA, PhD)

Philosophical work
- Era: Contemporary philosophy
- Region: Western philosophy
- School: Historicism; Pragmatism
- Institutions: Long Island University; University of South Carolina; University of Cincinnati; University of Western Ontario; Temple University
- Main interests: Relativism, Western philosophy, philosophy of art, history, aesthetics
- Notable ideas: Culturally emergent entities, the Flux, robust relativism, second-natured selves

Joseph Zalman Margolis (May 16, 1924 – June 8, 2021) was an American philosopher. A radical historicist, he authored many books critical of the central assumptions of Western philosophy, and elaborated a robust form of relativism.

His philosophical affinities included Protagoras, Hegel, C. S. Peirce, Dewey, Wittgenstein, and W.V. Quine.

== Biography ==
Joseph Margolis was the son of Jewish immigrants from central Europe. His father, a dentist, read widely in literature and was proficient in four languages.

Margolis served in World War II as a paratrooper and was wounded during the Battle of the Bulge, where he lost his only brother, a twin. He studied at Columbia University, earning the M.A. (1950) and Ph.D. (1953) in philosophy. His contemporaries at Columbia have included the philosophers Arthur C. Danto and Marx W. Wartofsky.

Margolis taught at numerous universities in the United States and Canada and was invited to lecture throughout Europe, in Japan, New Zealand, and South Africa. Beginning in 1991, he held the Laura H. Carnell Chair of Philosophy at Temple University.

In 1973 Margolis was one of the signers of the Humanist Manifesto II.

Margolis died in June 2021 at the age of 97.

== Philosophy ==
=== Introduction ===
As set out in Historied Thought, Constructed World (California, 1995), Margolis holds that philosophy is concerned principally with three things:

1. what we assume to be the nature of the real world, and why;
2. what we assume to be how much we might know about the real world, and why;
3. and after having answered those questions as best we can, how we should live out our lives, and why.

He sees the history of philosophy concerning these three questions of reality, knowledge and ethics as a gradual movement away from the idea that any of these three realms is changeless and towards an increasing acceptance of real change infecting all three spheres. Margolis emphasizes that legitimation is philosophy's principal task.

Margolis defends the Protagorean dictum that "man is the measure of all things", arguing that all changeless first principles must give way to consensual, though not criterial, truth claims. Since "man", the measure, is himself a creature of history, no modal claims of invariance can possibly be sustained. Margolis further avers that there need be no fixities either de re or de dicto or de cogitatione. The world is a flux and our thought about it is also in flux. Margolis sees the whole history of Western philosophy as a struggle between the advocates of change and those who either, like Parmenides, deny that change is intelligible, or those, like Heraclitus, who find some logos or law which allegedly governs whatever changes are admitted. He has argued that cognitive privilege of the changeless lingers even in relatively pragmatic philosophy such as the work of W.V. Quine. Nonetheless, Margolis proposes possible modes of legitimation even under the ubiquity of flux. Contrary to postmodern philosophers like Richard Rorty or Jean-François Lyotard, he argues that our lack of cognitive privilege means that the need for philosophical justification becomes more, not less, pressing. In this light, he regards logical positivism and post-structuralism both as "false starts" for similar reasons.

Margolis began close to the so-called analytical school of English-speaking philosophy, but his mature work draws freely on both analytic and Continental philosophy. In large part, this disciplinary eclecticism reflects his ambition to overcome the apparent opposition between the naturalist tradition of analytic philosophy and the humanistic tradition of Continental philosophy.

To achieve this, Margolis treats the "natural" as ontologically prior to the cultural, while emphasizing that we only know nature via cultural means; hence, the cultural is epistemologically prior to the natural. This position is developed at length in his Selves and Other Texts (Penn State, 2001).

His philosophical pursuits, expressed programmatically, are:

1. a critique of most mainstream Western philosophers, classical and modern;
2. the advocacy of a consistent form of relativism;
3. the defence of a radical historicism, which avoids the pitfalls of past historicisms, such as those of Hegel, Marx, or Michel Foucault;
4. and an account of how legitimation functions under his historicist conditions.

=== Themes ===
Margolis has published more than thirty books on a variety of topics in philosophy. In Historied Thought, Constructed World (California, 1995), he argues that philosophy uncritically adopts the Platonic-Aristotelian view that "necessarily, reality is invariantly structured and, when known, discernibly known to be such". Beginning with his counterproposal - "(2.1) It is not in any way conceptually necessary that reality possess invariant structures or an invariant nature" - Margolis gradually traces out an alternative view. For instance, Margolis argues that Aristotle's discussion of the principle of non-contradiction presupposes the changelessness of individual things rather than providing any proof of the alleged law. In Margolis's view, non-contradiction applies to "sentential formulas" and not to "meaningful sentences", since discourse in use may always offset any seeming contradiction via re-interpretation, as is routinely done in science (for instance, in the case of the wave theory versus the corpuscular theory of light). In other words, there is no conceptual necessity to accept a strictly bivalent logic; our logics depend, in a deep sense, on what we pre-thinkingly take the real world to be like. Hence, there is no reason to disallow relativism at all, for the world may well be the kind of place where incongruent judgments - judgments which on a bivalent reading would be "true" or "false", but are now no longer so, adhering to a many-valued logic, one consisting of more than two exclusive truth-values - are all that creatures such as ourselves may ever hope to legitimate.

Margolis goes on to examine reference and predication as our ability to probe and communicate the results of our probing. Constative discourse – the making of statements of fact — for instance, need only rely on identification, and reidentification, of items for it to prove effective in use. Therefore, historical memory and consensus, together with a narratizing ability, are all that are necessary to ensure the stability of what we make reference to; there need be nothing essential at all in things themselves, for our constative discourse to be able to flourish and even thrive. Margolis inveighs against postmodernists of Rorty's stamp, claiming that they risk disabling constative discourse in their objectivist fears of privilege. There need be, according to Margolis, no conceptual privilege involved in making statements, nor in the justifications proffered for the statements made.

Still, Margolis emphasizes that justifications cannot be dispensed with, as any statement implies a whole set of beliefs about the way the world is and about how we know that. We must legitimize our statements as best we can; we should never know why we should choose some over others, nor should we know how to proceed to make other statements building upon, but going beyond, our original exemplars.

The key to how we in fact "go on" is to be found in Margolis's major postulate of Historied Thought, Constructed World: "Thinking is a History". Making meaningful reference within constative discourse is a thoroughly historical skill. What we predicate - about what is thus referred to - is likewise historical. Margolis argues that the struggle to entrench changelessness either in human thought or human nature or physical nature has, in large part, been a futile struggle against acknowledging the lack of any fixed-kind nature of the human being. It is futile, Margolis claims, in that we have no natures but are histories. Nevertheless, Margolis admits that there are enough man-made would-be stabilities and fixities to go round. There is the habituating weight of the customary, the slow change in human languages, the inertia of institutions.

Margolis acknowledges that the historized "nature" of the human—and therefore of truth, of judgment, of reality, and the rest - is not his own discovery, but criticizes most previous versions of historicism as falling victim to some theological or teleological yearning, as in Hegel's Geist, Marx's utopianism, or Heidegger's history of being. In Margolis's view, the truth claims of earlier historical epochs are given their historical weight; from our own historical present, our own truth claims regarding theirs are subject to our own bias and blindness, but ours must still be legitimated as best we can legitimate them, taking into account, as far as humanly possible – though never overcoming - our limited horizon via self-critique.

Margolis claims that five philosophical themes have gathered momentum from the time of Kant on. They are:

1. Reality is cognitively intransparent. That is, everything we say about the world must pass through our conceptual schemes and the limits of our language; hence, there is no way of knowing whether what we say "corresponds" to what there is; what the world is like independent of our investigating it;
2. The structure of reality and the structure of thought are symbiotized. That is, there is no way of knowing how much of the apparent intelligibility of the world is a contribution of the mind and how much the world itself contributes to that seeming intelligibility;
3. Thinking has a history. That is, all we take to be universal, rational, logical, necessary, right behaviour, laws of nature, and so on, are changing artifacts of the historical existence of different societies and societal groups. All are open to change, and all are the sites of hegemonic struggle;
4. The structure of thinking is preformed. That is, our thinking is formed by the enculturing process by which human babies become adults. The infant begins in a holistic space which is immediately parsed according to the norms and conduct and language they are brought up in. By taking part in the process, we alter it, alter ourselves, and alter the conditions for the next generation;
5. Human culture, including human beings, are socially constructed or socially constituted. That is, they have no natures, but are (referentially) or have (predicatively) histories, narratized careers.

He embraces all five themes separately and conjointly, defends them all, and concludes that our future investigations of ourselves and of our world risk ignoring them at our own peril. His own investigations into "ourselves" have proceeded with a focus on a consideration of the arts as an expression of human being. In What, After All, Is a Work of Art (1999) and Selves and Other Texts (2001), he elaborated upon his earlier work on the ontological similarity between human persons and artworks. The latter – defined as "physically embodied, culturally emergent entities" – he treats as examples of "human utterance". Margolis argues that the cultural world is a semantically and semiotically dense domain, filled with self-interpreting texts, acts and artifacts.

=== Affinities and critique ===
Margolis has philosophical affinities with Hegel, Marx, Peirce, John Dewey, the later Wittgenstein, and Michel Foucault. From Hegel and Marx, he takes on their historicism without their teleologisms, or theories of some historical goal. From Peirce, he takes the idea of Secondness, the brute thingness of things which guides our sense of reality. With Dewey, he shares the conviction that philosophy should never exceed "natural" bounds. With Wittgenstein, he holds that "what has to be accepted, the given, is – so one could say – forms of life" (PI; 226). Finally, Margolis sees Foucault's "historical a priori" as a fair replacement for Kant's transcendental a priori.

Margolis has extensively criticized what he sees as scientism in philosophy, singling out thinkers such as Noam Chomsky, Paul Churchland, Jerry Fodor, and Daniel Dennett as modern-day defenders of invariance.

== Bibliography ==
=== Sole author ===
- Three Paradoxes of Personhood: The Venetian Lectures (Roberta Dreon editor). Mimesis International 2017. 140 pp.
- Toward a Metaphysics of Culture. New York: Routledge, 2016. 232 pp.
- Pragmatism Ascendent: A Yard of Narrative, A Touch of Prophecy. Stanford University Press, 2012 (Michael A. Peters review on Notre Dame Philosophical Reviews).
- The Cultural Space of the Arts and the Infelicities of Reductionism. New York: Columbia University Press, 2010. xvi + 213 pp.
- Pragmatism's Advantage: American and European Philosophy at the End of the Twentieth Century. Stanford: Stanford University Press, 2010. 172 pp.
- Culture and Cultural Entities. 2nd edition (with new preface and concluding chapter). Dordrecht: Springer, 2009. 156 pp. (1st edition 1984).
- The Arts and the Definition of the Human: Toward a Philosophical Anthropology. Stanford: Stanford University Press, 2008. 200 pp.
- On Aesthetics: An Unforgiving Introduction. Belmont, Cal.: Wadsworth, 2008. 204 pp.
- Pragmatism Without Foundations: Reconciling Relativism and Realism. 2nd edition. London and New York: Continuum, 2007. 286 pp. (1st edition 1986)
- Introduction to Philosophical Problems. 2nd edition. London and New York: Continuum, 2006. 266 pp. (1st edition titled Knowledge and Existence 1973)
- Moral Philosophy After 9/11. University Park, PA: Pennsylvania State University Press, 2004. 150 pp.
- The Unraveling of Scientism: American Philosophy at the End of the Twentieth Century. Ithaca, N.Y.: Cornell University Press, 2003. 178 pp.
- Reinventing Pragmatism: American Philosophy at the End of the Twentieth Century. Ithaca, N.Y.: Cornell University Press, 2002. 224 pp.
- Selves and Other Texts: The Case for Cultural Realism. University Park: Pennsylvania State University Press, 2001. 224 pp
- What, After All, Is a Work of Art? Lectures in the Philosophy of Art. University Park: Pennsylvania State University Press, 1999. xxii+ 143 pp.
- A Second-Best Morality. The Lindley Lecture, University of Kansas, 14 October 1997. Lawrence: University of Kansas, 1998. 26 pp.
- Life without Principles: Reconciling Theory and Practice. Oxford: Basil Blackwell, 1996. x + 262 pp.
- Historied Thought, Constructed World: A Conceptual Primer for the Turn of the Millennium. Berkeley: University of California Press, 1995. x + 377 pp. (text online at escholarship.org)
- Interpretation Radical But Not Unruly: The New Puzzle of the Arts and History. Berkeley: University of California Press, 1995. xiii + 312pp. (text online at escholarship.org)
- The Flux of History and the Flux of Science. Berkeley: University of California Press, 1993. x + 238 pp. (text online at escholarship.org)
- The Truth about Relativism. Oxford: Basil Blackwell, 1991. xvi + 224pp.
- Texts Without Referents: Reconciling Science and Narrative. Oxford: Basil Blackwell, 1989. xxiv + 386 pp.
- Science Without Unity: Reconciling the Natural and the Human Sciences. Oxford: Basil Blackwell, 1987. xxii + 470 pp.
- Pragmatism Without Foundations: Reconciling Relativism and Realism. Oxford: Basil Blackwell, 1986. xx + 320 pp.
- Psychology: Designing the Discipline. With Peter Manicas, Rom Harré, and Paul Secord. Oxford: Basil Blackwell, 1986. viii + 168 pp.
- Culture and Cultural Entities. Dordrecht: D. Reidel, 1984. xiv + 162 pp.
- Philosophy of Psychology. Englewood Cliffs: Prentice-Hall, 1984. xvi + 107 pp.
- Art and Philosophy. Atlantic Highlands, N.J.: Humanities Press; Hassocks: Harvester Press, 1980. xiii + 350 pp.
- Persons and Minds. Boston Studies in the Philosophy of Science. Dordrecht: D. Reidel, 1978. x + 301pp. Translated into Russian translation, (Moscow: Progress Publishers, 1986), 419 pp.
- Negativities: The Limits of Life. Columbus, Ohio: Charles Merrill, 1975. ix + 166 pp.
- Knowledge and Existence: An Introduction to Philosophical Problems. New York: Oxford University Press, 1973. xiv + 289 pp.
- Values and Conduct. Oxford: Oxford University Press, 1971. x + 227 pp.
- Psychotherapy and Morality: A Study of Two Concepts. New York: Random House, 1966. xii + 174 pp.
- The Language of Art and Art Criticism: Analytic Questions in Aesthetics. Detroit: Wayne State University Press, 1965. 201 pp.
- The Art of Freedom: An Essay in Ethical Theory. Dissertation, Columbia University, 1953.

=== Collections and journal issues edited ===
- A Companion To Pragmatism. Edited by John R. Shook and Joseph Margolis. Oxford: Blackwell, 2006.
- History, Historicity and Science. Edited by Tom Rockmore and Joseph Margolis. Aldershot, UK and Burlington, Vt.: Ashgate, 2006
- The Philosophical Challenge of September 11. Edited with Armen Marsoobian and Tom Rockmore. Oxford: Blackwell, 2003. 260pp.
- The Quarrel between Invariance and Flux: A Guide for Philosophers and Other Players. With Jacques Catudal. University Park: Pennsylvania State University Press, 2001. 273pp.
- The Philosophy of Interpretation, Edited by Joseph Margolis and Tom Rockmore. Oxford: Basil Blackwell, 2000. (Also published in Metaphilosophy 31.1-2 (January 2000): 1–228.)
- A Companion to Aesthetics. Edited by David E. Cooper with advisory editors Joseph Margolis and Crispin Sartwell. Oxford: Blackwell, 1992.
- The Heidegger Case: On Philosophy and Politics. Edited by Joseph Margolis and Tom Rockmore. Philadelphia: Temple University Press, 1992. xii + 437 pp.
- "The Ontology of History", Joseph Margolis, Special Editor. The Monist 74.2 (April 1991): 129–292.
- "Interpretation", Joseph Margolis, Special Editor. The Monist 73.2 (April 1990): 115–330.
- Victor Farías, Heidegger and Nazism. Edited by Joseph Margolis and Tom Rockmore. Philadelphia: Temple University Press, 1989. xxi + 368 pp.
- Rationality, Relativism, and the Methodology of the Human Sciences. Edited by Joseph Margolis, Michael Krausz, and Richard M. Burian. Dordrecht: Martinus Nijhoff, 1986. viii + 234 pp.
- Philosophy Looks at the Arts, 3rd ed. Edited by Joseph Margolis. Philadelphia: Temple University Press, 1986. xii + 605 pp.
- "Is Relativism Defensible?", Joseph Margolis, Special Editor. The Monist 67.3 (July 1984): 291- 482.
- The Worlds of Art and the World. Edited by Joseph Margolis. Grazer Philosophische Studien vol. 19. Amsterdam: Rodopi, 1983. viii + 203 pp.
- An Introduction to Philosophical Inquiry, 2nd ed. Edited by Joseph Margolis. New York: Alfred A Knopf, 1978. xiv + 679 pp.
- Philosophical Looks at the Arts, 2nd ed. Edited by Joseph Margolis. Philadelphia: Temple University Press, 1978. x + 481 pp.
- Fact and Existence. Edited by Joseph Margolis. Proceedings of the University of Western Ontario Philosophy Colloguium, 1966. Oxford: Blackwell; Toronto: University of Toronto Press, 1969. viii + 144 pp.
- An Introduction to Philosophical Inquiry. Edited by Joseph Margolis. New York: Alfred A. Knopf, 1968. xii + 942 pp.
- Contemporary Ethical Theory. Edited by Joseph Margolis. New York: Random House, 1966. viii + 536 pp.
- Philosophy Looks at the Arts. Edited by Joseph Margolis. New York: Charles Scribner's Sons, 1962. x + 235 pp.

== See also ==
- American philosophy
- Pragmatism
- Relativism
- List of American philosophers
