= Relativism =

Philosophical view rejecting objectivity

Relativism is a family of philosophical views which deny claims to absolute objectivity within a particular domain and assert that valuations in that domain are relative to the perspective of an observer or the context in which they are assessed.

There are many different forms of relativism, with a great deal of variation in scope and differing degrees of controversy among them. Moral relativism encompasses the differences in moral judgments among people and cultures. Epistemic relativism holds that there are no absolute principles regarding normative belief, justification, or rationality, and that there are only relative ones. Alethic relativism (also factual relativism) is the doctrine that there are no absolute truths, i.e., that truth is always relative to some particular frame of reference, such as a language or a culture (cultural relativism), while linguistic relativism asserts that a language's structures influence a speaker's perceptions. Some forms of relativism also bear a resemblance to philosophical skepticism. Descriptive relativism seeks to describe the differences among cultures and people without evaluation, while normative relativism evaluates the word truthfulness of views within a given framework.

== Forms ==
=== Anthropological versus philosophical relativism ===
Anthropological relativism refers to a methodological stance, in which the researcher suspends (or brackets) their own cultural prejudice while trying to understand beliefs or behaviors in their contexts. This has become known as methodological relativism, and concerns itself specifically with avoiding ethnocentrism or the application of one's own cultural standards to the assessment of other cultures. This is also the basis of the so-called "emic" and "etic" distinction, in which:

- An emic or insider account of behavior is a description of a society in terms that are meaningful to the participant or actor's own culture; an emic account is therefore culture-specific, and typically refers to what is considered "common sense" within the culture under observation.
- An etic or outsider account is a description of a society by an observer, in terms that can be applied to other cultures; that is, an etic account is culturally neutral, and typically refers to the conceptual framework of the social scientist. (This is complicated when it is scientific research itself that is under study, or when there is theoretical or terminological disagreement within the social sciences.)

Philosophical relativism, in contrast, asserts that the truth of a proposition depends on the metaphysical, or theoretical frame, or the instrumental method, or the context in which the proposition is expressed, or on the person, groups, or culture who interpret the proposition.

Methodological relativism and philosophical relativism can exist independently from one another, but most anthropologists base their methodological relativism on that of the philosophical variety.

=== Descriptive versus normative relativism ===
The concept of relativism also has importance both for philosophers and for anthropologists in another way. In general, anthropologists engage in descriptive relativism ("how things are" or "how things seem"), whereas philosophers engage in normative relativism ("how things ought to be"), although there is some overlap (for example, descriptive relativism can pertain to concepts, normative relativism to truth).

Descriptive relativism assumes that certain cultural groups have different modes of thought, standards of reasoning, and so forth, and it is the anthropologist's task to describe, but not to evaluate the validity of these principles and practices of a cultural group. It is possible for an anthropologist in his or her fieldwork to be a descriptive relativist about some things that typically concern the philosopher (e.g., ethical principles) but not about others (e.g., logical principles). However, the descriptive relativist's empirical claims about epistemic principles, moral ideals and the like are often countered by anthropological arguments that such things are universal, and much of the recent literature on these matters is explicitly concerned with the extent of, and evidence for, cultural or moral or linguistic or human universals.

The fact that the various species of descriptive relativism are empirical claims may tempt the philosopher to conclude that they are of little philosophical interest, but there are several reasons why this is not so. First, some philosophers, notably Kant, argue that certain sorts of cognitive differences between human beings (or even all rational beings) are impossible, so such differences could never be found to obtain in fact, an argument that places a priori limits on what empirical inquiry could discover and on what versions of descriptive relativism could be true. Second, claims about actual differences between groups play a central role in some arguments for normative relativism (for example, arguments for normative ethical relativism often begin with claims that different groups in fact have different moral codes or ideals). Finally, the anthropologist's descriptive account of relativism helps to separate the fixed aspects of human nature from those that can vary, and so a descriptive claim that some important aspect of experience or thought does (or does not) vary across groups of human beings tells us something important about human nature and the human condition.

Normative relativism concerns normative or evaluative claims that modes of thought, standards of reasoning, or the like are only right or wrong relative to a framework. 'Normative' is meant in a general sense, applying to a wide range of views; in the case of beliefs, for example, normative correctness equals truth. This does not mean, of course, that framework-relative correctness or truth is always clear, the first challenge being to explain what it amounts to in any given case (e.g., with respect to concepts, truth, epistemic norms). Normative relativism (say, in regard to normative ethical relativism) therefore implies that things (say, ethical claims) are not simply true in themselves, but only have truth values relative to broader frameworks (say, moral codes). (Many normative ethical relativist arguments run from premises about ethics to conclusions that assert the relativity of truth values, bypassing general claims about the nature of truth, but it is often more illuminating to consider the type of relativism under question directly.)

=== Legal relativism ===
In English common law, two (perhaps three) separate standards of proof are recognized:

- proof based on the balance of probabilities is the lesser standard used in civil litigation, which cases mostly concern money or some other penalty, that, if further and better evidence should emerge, is reasonably reversible.
- proof beyond reasonable doubt is used in criminal law cases where an accused's right to personal freedom or survival is in question, because such punishment is not reasonably reversible.
- Absolute truth is so complex as to be only capable of being fully understood by the omniscient established during the Tudor period as the one true God

== Related and contrasting positions ==
Relationism is the theory that there are only relations between individual entities, and no intrinsic properties. Despite the similarity in name, it is held by some to be a position distinct from relativism—for instance, because "statements about relational properties [...] assert an absolute truth about things in the world". On the other hand, others wish to equate relativism, relationism and even relativity, which is a precise theory of relationships between physical objects: Nevertheless, "This confluence of relativity theory with relativism became a strong contributing factor in the increasing prominence of relativism".

Whereas previous investigations of science only sought sociological or psychological explanations of failed scientific theories or pathological science, the 'strong programme' is more relativistic, assessing scientific truth and falsehood equally in a historic and cultural context.

== Criticisms ==
A common argument against relativism suggests that it inherently refutes itself: the statement "all is relative" classes either as a relative statement or as an absolute one. If it is relative, then this statement does not rule out absolutes. If the statement is absolute, on the other hand, then it provides an example of an absolute statement, proving that not all truths are relative. However, this argument against relativism only applies to relativism that positions truth as relative–i.e. epistemological/truth-value relativism. More specifically, it is only extreme forms of epistemological relativism that can come in for this criticism as there are many epistemological relativists who posit that some aspects of what is regarded as factually "true" are not universal, yet still accept that other universal truths exist (e.g. gas laws or moral laws).

Another argument against relativism posits the existence of natural law. Simply put, the physical universe works under basic principles: the "Laws of Nature". Some contend that a natural moral law may also exist, for example as argued by, Immanuel Kant in Critique of Practical Reason, Richard Dawkins in The God Delusion (2006) and addressed by C. S. Lewis in Mere Christianity (1952). Dawkins said "I think we face an equal but much more sinister challenge from the left, in the shape of cultural relativism – the view that scientific truth is only one kind of truth and it is not to be especially privileged". Philosopher Hilary Putnam, among others, states that some forms of relativism make it impossible to believe one is in error. If there is no truth beyond an individual's belief that something is true, then an individual cannot hold their own beliefs to be false or mistaken. A related criticism is that relativizing truth to individuals destroys the distinction between truth and belief.

Philosopher Donald Davidson presented an influential critique of conceptual relativism in his 1974 essay On the Very Idea of a Conceptual Scheme. Conceptual relativism is the idea that different people or even entire communities could make sense of the world in radically different, incommensurable (meaning untranslatable) ways. One of the consequences of this idea is that truth is relative to one's way of thinking rather than objective. Davidson attacks what he believes to be the entire framework which makes conceptual relativism intelligible, namely scheme–content dualism, which is the idea that all knowledge is the result of one's scheme of concepts being imposed upon empirical content from the world. In refuting scheme–content dualism, Davidson shows that knowledge of one's scheme of concepts is necessarily inseparable from one's knowledge of the world, and so translation between different people or communities is always possible in principle.

According to Belgian philosopher of science Maarten Boudry, relativism is rarely applied consistently. In an opinion piece, he argues that no one truly acts according to the belief that truth is relative. Even self-proclaimed relativists, he suggests, do not genuinely believe their own slogans and catchphrases. They become indignant when falsely accused of a crime and laugh at those who claim the Earth is flat. Boudry contends that people abandon their relativism when it really matters—for instance, when visiting a doctor for cancer screening or boarding a plane, trusting in the laws of physics. He argues that relativism about truth is not so much a sincere conviction as it is an empty slogan or a convenient rhetorical device people deploy when it suits them. Boudry refers to this phenomenon as “occasional relativism,” highlighting what he sees as the casual and opportunistic nature of such relativist claims.

== Views ==
=== Philosophical ===
==== Ancient ====
===== Sophism =====
Sophists are considered the founding fathers of relativism in Western philosophy. Elements of relativism emerged among the Sophists in the 5th century BC. Notably, it was Protagoras who coined the phrase, "Man is the measure of all things: of things which are, that they are, and of things which are not, that they are not." The thinking of the Sophists is mainly known through their opponent, Plato. In a paraphrase from Plato's dialogue Theaetetus, Protagoras said: "What is true for you is true for you, and what is true for me is true for me."

==== Modern ====
===== Bernard Crick =====
Bernard Crick, a British political scientist and advocate of relativism, suggested in In Defence of Politics (1962) that moral conflict between people is inevitable. He thought that only ethics can resolve such conflict, and when that occurs in public it results in politics. Accordingly, Crick saw the process of dispute resolution, harms reduction, mediation or peacemaking as central to all of moral philosophy. He became an important influence on feminists and later on the Greens.

===== Paul Feyerabend =====
Philosopher of science Paul Feyerabend is often considered to be a relativist, although he denied being one.

Feyerabend argued that modern science suffers from being methodologically monistic (the belief that only a single methodology can produce scientific progress). Feyerabend summarises his case in Against Method with the phrase "anything goes".

In an aphorism [Feyerabend] often repeated, "potentially every culture is all cultures". This is intended to convey that world views are not hermetically closed, since their leading concepts have an "ambiguity" – better, an open-endedness – which enables people from other cultures to engage with them. [...] It follows that relativism, understood as the doctrine that truth is relative to closed systems, can get no purchase. [...] For Feyerabend, both hermetic relativism and its absolutist rival [realism] serve, in their different ways, to "devalue human existence". The former encourages that unsavoury brand of political correctness which takes the refusal to criticise "other cultures" to the extreme of condoning murderous dictatorship and barbaric practices. The latter, especially in its favoured contemporary form of "scientific realism", with the excessive prestige it affords to the abstractions of "the monster 'science'", is in bed with a politics which likewise disdains variety, richness and everyday individuality – a politics which likewise "hides" its norms behind allegedly neutral facts, "blunts choices and imposes laws".

===== Thomas Kuhn =====
Thomas Kuhn's philosophy of science, as expressed in The Structure of Scientific Revolutions, is often interpreted as relativistic. He claimed that, as well as progressing steadily and incrementally ("normal science"), science undergoes periodic revolutions or "paradigm shifts", leaving scientists working in different paradigms with difficulty in even communicating. Thus the truth of a claim, or the existence of a posited entity, is relative to the paradigm employed. However, it is not necessary for him to embrace relativism because every paradigm presupposes the prior, building upon itself through history and so on. This leads to there being a fundamental, incremental, and referential structure of development which is not relative but again, fundamental.

From these remarks, one thing is however certain: Kuhn is not saying that incommensurable theories cannot be compared – what they can't be is compared in terms of a system of common measure. He very plainly says that they can be compared, and he reiterates this repeatedly in later work, in a (mostly in vain) effort to avert the crude and sometimes catastrophic misinterpretations he suffered from mainstream philosophers and post-modern relativists alike.

But Kuhn rejected the accusation of being a relativist later in his postscript:

scientific development is ... a unidirectional and irreversible process. Later scientific theories are better than earlier ones for solving puzzles ... That is not a relativist's position, and it displays the sense in which I am a convinced believer in scientific progress.

Some have argued that one can also read Kuhn's work as essentially positivist in its ontology: the revolutions he posits are epistemological, lurching toward a presumably 'better' understanding of an objective reality through the lens presented by the new paradigm. However, a number of passages in Structure do indeed appear to be distinctly relativist, and to directly challenge the notion of an objective reality and the ability of science to progress towards an ever-greater grasp of it, particularly through the process of paradigm change.

In the sciences there need not be progress of another sort. We may, to be more precise, have to relinquish the notion, explicit or implicit, that changes of paradigm carry scientists and those who learn from them closer and closer to the truth.

We are all deeply accustomed to seeing science as the one enterprise that draws constantly nearer to some goal set by nature in advance. But need there be any such goal? Can we not account for both science's existence and its success in terms of evolution from the community's state of knowledge at any given time? Does it really help to imagine that there is some one full, objective, true account of nature and that the proper measure of scientific achievement is the extent to which it brings us closer to that ultimate goal?

===== George Lakoff and Mark Johnson =====
George Lakoff and Mark Johnson define relativism in Metaphors We Live By as the rejection of both subjectivism and metaphysical objectivism in order to focus on the relationship between them, i.e. the metaphor by which we relate our current experience to our previous experience. In particular, Lakoff and Johnson characterize "objectivism" as a "straw man", and, to a lesser degree, criticize the views of Karl Popper, Kant and Aristotle.

===== Robert Nozick =====
In his book Invariances, Robert Nozick expresses a complex set of theories about the absolute and the relative. He thinks the absolute/relative distinction should be recast in terms of an invariant/variant distinction, where there are many things a proposition can be invariant with regard to or vary with. He thinks it is coherent for truth to be relative, and speculates that it might vary with time. He thinks necessity is an unobtainable notion, but can be approximated by robust invariance across a variety of conditions—although we can never identify a proposition that is invariant with regard to everything. Finally, he is not particularly warm to one of the most famous forms of relativism, moral relativism, preferring an evolutionary account.

===== Joseph Margolis =====
Joseph Margolis advocates a view he calls "robust relativism" and defends it in his books Historied Thought, Constructed World, Chapter 4 (California, 1995) and The Truth about Relativism (Blackwell, 1991). He opens his account by stating that our logics should depend on what we take to be the nature of the sphere to which we wish to apply our logics. Holding that there can be no distinctions which are not "privileged" between the alethic, the ontic, and the epistemic, he maintains that a many-valued logic just might be the most apt for aesthetics or history since, because in these practices, we are loath to hold to simple binary logic; and he also holds that many-valued logic is relativistic. (This is perhaps an unusual definition of "relativistic". Compare with his comments on "relationism".) To say that "True" and "False" are mutually exclusive and exhaustive judgements on Hamlet, for instance, really does seem absurd. A many-valued logic—with its values "apt", "reasonable", "likely", and so on—seems intuitively more applicable to interpreting Hamlet. Where apparent contradictions arise between such interpretations, we might call the interpretations "incongruent", rather than dubbing either of them "false", because using many-valued logic implies that a measured value is a mixture of two extreme possibilities. Using the subset of many-valued logic, fuzzy logic, it can be said that various interpretations can be represented by membership in more than one possible truth set simultaneously. Fuzzy logic is therefore probably the best mathematical structure for understanding "robust relativism" and has been interpreted by Bart Kosko as philosophically being related to Zen Buddhism.

It was Aristotle who held that relativism implies that we should, sticking with appearances only, end up contradicting ourselves somewhere if we could apply all attributes to all ousiai (beings). Aristotle, however, made non-contradiction dependent upon his essentialism. If his essentialism is false, then so too is his ground for disallowing relativism. (Subsequent philosophers have found other reasons for supporting the principle of non-contradiction.)

Beginning with Protagoras and invoking Charles Sanders Peirce, Margolis shows that the historic struggle to discredit relativism is an attempt to impose an unexamined belief in the world's essentially rigid rule-like nature. Plato and Aristotle merely attacked "relationalism"—the doctrine of true for l or true for k, and the like, where l and k are different speakers or different worlds—or something similar (most philosophers would call this position "relativism"). For Margolis, "true" means true; that is, the alethic use of "true" remains untouched. However, in real world contexts, and context is ubiquitous in the real world, we must apply truth values. Here, in epistemic terms, we might tout court retire "true" as an evaluation and keep "false". The rest of our value-judgements could be graded from "extremely plausible" down to "false". Judgements which on a bivalent logic would be incompatible or contradictory are further seen as "incongruent", although one may well have more weight than the other. In short, relativistic logic is not, or need not be, the bugbear it is often presented to be. It may simply be the best type of logic to apply to certain very uncertain spheres of real experiences in the world (although some sort of logic needs to be applied in order to make that judgement). Those who swear by bivalent logic might simply be the ultimate keepers of the great fear of the flux.

===== Richard Rorty =====
Philosopher Richard Rorty has a somewhat paradoxical role in the debate over relativism: he is criticized for his relativistic views by many commentators, but has always denied that relativism applies to much anybody, being nothing more than a Platonic scarecrow. Rorty claims, rather, that he is a pragmatist, and that to construe pragmatism as relativism is to beg the question.

'"Relativism" is the traditional epithet applied to pragmatism by realists'

'"Relativism" is the view that every belief on a certain topic, or perhaps about any topic, is as good as every other. No one holds this view. Except for the occasional cooperative freshman, one cannot find anybody who says that two incompatible opinions on an important topic are equally good. The philosophers who get called 'relativists' are those who say that the grounds for choosing between such opinions are less algorithmic than had been thought.'

'In short, my strategy for escaping the self-referential difficulties into which "the Relativist" keeps getting himself is to move everything over from epistemology and metaphysics into cultural politics, from claims to knowledge and appeals to self-evidence to suggestions about what we should try.'

Rorty takes a deflationary attitude to truth, believing there is nothing of interest to be said about truth in general, including the contention that it is generally subjective. He also argues that the notion of warrant or justification can do most of the work traditionally assigned to the concept of truth, and that justification is relative; justification is justification to an audience, for Rorty.

In Contingency, Irony, and Solidarity he argues that the debate between so-called relativists and so-called objectivists is beside the point because they do not have enough premises in common for either side to prove anything to the other.

===== Nalin de Silva =====
In his book Mage Lokaya (My World), 1986, Nalin de Silva criticized the basis of the established western system of knowledge, and its propagation, which he refers as "domination throughout the world".He explained in this book that mind independent reality is impossible and knowledge is not found but constructed. Further he has introduced and developed the concept of "Constructive Relativism" as the basis on which knowledge is constructed relative to the sense organs, culture and the mind completely based on Avidya.

==== Postmodernism ====
The term "relativism" often comes up in debates over postmodernism, poststructuralism and phenomenology. Critics of these perspectives often identify advocates with the label "relativism". For example, the Sapir–Whorf hypothesis is often considered a relativist view because it posits that linguistic categories and structures shape the way people view the world. Stanley Fish has defended postmodernism and relativism.

These perspectives do not strictly count as relativist in the philosophical sense, because they express agnosticism on the nature of reality and make epistemological rather than ontological claims. Nevertheless, the term is useful to differentiate them from realists who believe that the purpose of philosophy, science, or literary critique is to locate externally true meanings. Important philosophers and theorists such as Michel Foucault, Max Stirner, political movements such as post-anarchism or post-Marxism can also be considered as relativist in this sense – though a better term might be social constructivist.

The spread and popularity of this kind of "soft" relativism varies between academic disciplines. It has wide support in anthropology and has a majority following in cultural studies. It also has advocates in political theory and political science, sociology, and continental philosophy (as distinct from Anglo-American analytical philosophy). It has inspired empirical studies of the social construction of meaning such as those associated with labelling theory, which defenders can point to as evidence of the validity of their theories (albeit risking accusations of performative contradiction in the process). Advocates of this kind of relativism often also claim that recent developments in the natural sciences, such as Heisenberg's uncertainty principle, quantum mechanics, chaos theory and complexity theory show that science is now becoming relativistic. However, many scientists who use these methods continue to identify as realist or post-positivist, and some sharply criticize the association.

=== Religious ===
==== Buddhism ====
Madhyamaka Buddhism, which forms the basis for many Mahayana Buddhist schools, was founded by Nāgārjuna. Nāgārjuna taught the idea of relativity. In the Ratnāvalī, he gives the example that shortness exists only in relation to the idea of length. The determination of a thing or object is only possible in relation to other things or objects, especially by way of contrast. He held that the relationship between the ideas of "short" and "long" is not due to intrinsic nature (svabhāva). This idea is also found in the Pali Nikāyas and Chinese Āgamas, in which the idea of relativity is expressed similarly: "That which is the element of light ... is seen to exist on account of [in relation to] darkness; that which is the element of good is seen to exist on account of bad; that which is the element of space is seen to exist on account of form."

Madhyamaka Buddhism discerns two levels of truth: relative and ultimate. The two truths doctrine states that there are Relative or conventional, common-sense truth, which describes our daily experience of a concrete world, and Ultimate truth, which describes the ultimate reality as sunyata, empty of concrete and inherent characteristics. Conventional truth may be understood, in contrast, as "obscurative truth" or "that which obscures the true nature". It is constituted by the appearances of mistaken awareness. Conventional truth would be the appearance that includes a duality of apprehender and apprehended, and objects perceived within that. Ultimate truth is the phenomenal world free from the duality of apprehender and apprehended.

==== Catholicism ====
The Catholic Church, especially under John Paul II and Pope Benedict XVI, has identified relativism as one of the most significant problems for faith and morals today.

According to the Church and to some theologians, relativism, as a denial of absolute truth, leads to moral license and a denial of the possibility of sin and of God. Whether moral or epistemological, relativism constitutes a denial of the capacity of the human mind and reason to arrive at truth. Truth, according to Catholic theologians and philosophers (following Aristotle) consists of adequatio rei et intellectus, the correspondence of the mind and reality. Another way of putting it states that the mind has the same form as reality. This means when the form of the computer in front of someone (the type, color, shape, capacity, etc.) is also the form that is in their mind, then what they know is true because their mind corresponds to objective reality.

The denial of an absolute reference, of an axis mundi, denies God, who equates to Absolute Truth, according to these Christian theologians. They link relativism to secularism, an obstruction of religion in human life. Some theistic philosophers and theologians, however, adopt a more differentiated perspective on relativism in this respect.

===== Leo XIII =====
Pope Leo XIII (1810–1903) was the first known Pope to use the word "relativism", in his encyclical Humanum genus (1884). Leo condemned Freemasonry and claimed that its philosophical and political system was largely based on relativism.

===== John Paul II =====
John Paul II wrote in Veritatis Splendor

As is immediately evident, the crisis of truth is not unconnected with this development. Once the idea of a universal truth about the good, knowable by human reason, is lost, inevitably the notion of conscience also changes. Conscience is no longer considered in its primordial reality as an act of a person's intelligence, the function of which is to apply the universal knowledge of the good in a specific situation and thus to express a judgment about the right conduct to be chosen here and now. Instead, there is a tendency to grant to the individual conscience the prerogative of independently determining the criteria of good and evil and then acting accordingly. Such an outlook is quite congenial to an individualist ethic, wherein each individual is faced with his own truth, different from the truth of others. Taken to its extreme consequences, this individualism leads to a denial of the very idea of human nature.

In Evangelium Vitae (The Gospel of Life), he says:

Freedom negates and destroys itself, and becomes a factor leading to the destruction of others, when it no longer recognizes and respects its essential link with the truth. When freedom, out of a desire to emancipate itself from all forms of tradition and authority, shuts out even the most obvious evidence of an objective and universal truth, which is the foundation of personal and social life, then the person ends up by no longer taking as the sole and indisputable point of reference for his own choices the truth about good and evil, but only his subjective and changeable opinion or, indeed, his selfish interest and whim.

===== Benedict XVI =====
In April 2005, in his homily during Mass prior to the conclave which would elect him as Pope, then Cardinal Joseph Ratzinger talked about the world "moving towards a dictatorship of relativism":

How many winds of doctrine we have known in recent decades, how many ideological currents, how many ways of thinking. The small boat of thought of many Christians has often been tossed about by these waves – thrown from one extreme to the other: from Marxism to liberalism, even to libertinism; from collectivism to radical individualism; from atheism to a vague religious mysticism; from agnosticism to syncretism, and so forth. Every day new sects are created and what Saint Paul says about human trickery comes true, with cunning which tries to draw those into error (cf Ephesians 4, 14). Having a clear Faith, based on the Creed of the Church, is often labeled today as a fundamentalism. Whereas, relativism, which is letting oneself be tossed and "swept along by every wind of teaching", looks like the only attitude acceptable to today's standards. We are moving towards a dictatorship of relativism which does not recognize anything as certain and which has as its highest goal one's own ego and one's own desires. However, we have a different goal: the Son of God, true man. He is the measure of true humanism. Being an "Adult" means having a faith which does not follow the waves of today's fashions or the latest novelties. A faith which is deeply rooted in friendship with Christ is adult and mature. It is this friendship which opens us up to all that is good and gives us the knowledge to judge true from false, and deceit from truth.

On June 6, 2005, Pope Benedict XVI told educators:

Today, a particularly insidious obstacle to the task of education is the massive presence in our society and culture of that relativism which, recognizing nothing as definitive, leaves as the ultimate criterion only the self with its desires. And under the semblance of freedom it becomes a prison for each one, for it separates people from one another, locking each person into his or her own 'ego'.

Then during the World Youth Day in August 2005, he also traced to relativism the problems produced by the communist and sexual revolutions, and provided a counter-counter argument.

In the last century we experienced revolutions with a common programme–expecting nothing more from God, they assumed total responsibility for the cause of the world in order to change it. And this, as we saw, meant that a human and partial point of view was always taken as an absolute guiding principle. Absolutizing what is not absolute but relative is called totalitarianism. It does not liberate man, but takes away his dignity and enslaves him. It is not ideologies that save the world, but only a return to the living God, our Creator, the Guarantor of our freedom, the Guarantor of what is really good and true.

===== Pope Francis =====
Pope Francis refers in Evangelii gaudium to two forms of relativism, "doctrinal relativism" and a "practical relativism" typical of "our age", noting that pastoral workers who believe in the ideals of the Church may still fall into a form of relativism based on a lack of enthusiasm for social participation and focus on individualism.

Pastoral workers can thus fall into a relativism which, whatever their particular style of spirituality or way of thinking, proves even more dangerous than doctrinal relativism. It has to do with the deepest and inmost decisions that shape their way of life. This practical relativism consists in acting as if God did not exist, making decisions as if the poor did not exist, setting goals as if others did not exist, working as if people who have not received the Gospel did not exist. It is striking that even some who clearly have solid doctrinal and spiritual convictions frequently fall into a lifestyle which leads to an attachment to financial security, or to a desire for power or human glory at all cost, rather than giving their lives to others in mission.

==== Jainism ====
Mahavira (599–527 BC), the 24th Tirthankara of Jainism, developed a philosophy known as Anekantavada. John Koller describes anekāntavāda as "epistemological respect for view of others" about the nature of existence, whether it is "inherently enduring or constantly changing", but "not relativism; it does not mean conceding that all arguments and all views are equal".

==== Sikhism ====
In Sikhism the Gurus (spiritual teachers) have propagated the message of "many paths" leading to the one God and ultimate salvation for all souls who tread on the path of righteousness. They have supported the view that proponents of all faiths can, by doing good and virtuous deeds and by remembering the Lord, certainly achieve salvation. The students of the Sikh faith are told to accept all leading faiths as possible vehicles for attaining spiritual enlightenment provided the faithful study, ponder and practice the teachings of their prophets and leaders. The holy book of the Sikhs called the Sri Guru Granth Sahib says: "Do not say that the Vedas, the Bible and the Koran are false. Those who do not contemplate them are false." Guru Granth Sahib page 1350; later stating: "The seconds, minutes, and hours, days, weeks and months, and the various seasons originate from the one Sun; O nanak, in just the same way, the many forms originate from the Creator." Guru Granth Sahib page 12,13.

== See also ==
- Alternative facts
- Baháʼí Faith and the unity of religion
- Degree of truth
- Egocentric predicament
- False dilemma
- Graded absolutism
- Multi-valued logic
- Normative ethics
- Perspectivism
- Philosophical pluralism
- Philosophical universalism
- Polylogism
- Principle of bivalence
- Propositional logic
- Relationism
- Religiocentrism
- Science wars
- Scientism
- Social constructionism
- Subjective logic
- Worldview

== Bibliography ==
- Maria Baghramian, Relativism, London: Routledge, 2004, ISBN 0-415-16150-9
- Gad Barzilai, Communities and Law: Politics and Cultures of Legal Identities, Ann Arbor: University of Michigan Press, 2003, ISBN 0-472-11315-1
- Andrew Lionel Blais, On the Plurality of Actual Worlds, University of Massachusetts Press, 1997, ISBN 1-55849-072-8
- Benjamin Brown, Thoughts and Ways of Thinking: Source Theory and Its Applications. London: Ubiquity Press, 2017. .
- Buchbinder, David; McGuire, Ann Elizabeth (2007). "The backlash against relativism: the new curricular fundamentalism". The International Journal of the Humanities: Annual Review. 5 (5). Common Ground Journals and Books: 51–59. doi:10.18848/1447-9508/CGP/v05i05/42109.
- Ernest Gellner, Relativism and the Social Sciences, Cambridge: Cambridge University Press, 1985, ISBN 0-521-33798-4
- Rom Harré and Michael Krausz, Varieties of Relativism, Oxford, UK; New York, NY: Blackwell, 1996, ISBN 0-631-18409-0
- Bernd Irlenborn, Monotheism and Relativism, Cambridge: Cambridge University Press, 2025, ISBN 978-1-00-957193-7.
- Knight, Robert H. The Age of Consent: the Rise of Relativism and the Corruption of Popular Culture. Dallas, Tex.: Spence Publishing Co., 1998. xxiv, 253, [1] p. ISBN 1-890626-05-8
- Michael Krausz, ed., Relativism: A Contemporary Anthology, New York: Columbia University Press, 2010, ISBN 978-0-231-14410-0
- Martin Hollis, Steven Lukes, Rationality and Relativism, Oxford: Basil Blackwell, 1982, ISBN 0-631-12773-9
- Joseph Margolis, Michael Krausz, R. M. Burian, Eds., Rationality, Relativism, and the Human Sciences, Dordrecht: Boston, M. Nijhoff, 1986, ISBN 90-247-3271-9
- Jack W. Meiland, Michael Krausz, Eds. Relativism, Cognitive and Moral, Notre Dame: University of Notre Dame Press, 1982, ISBN 0-268-01611-9
- Markus Seidel, Epistemic Relativism: A Constructive Critique, Basingstoke: Palgrave Macmillan, 2014, ISBN 978-1-137-37788-3
