= List of American philosophers =

This is a list of American philosophers; of philosophers who are either from, or spent many productive years of their lives in the United States.

Contents

A B C D E F G H I J K L M N O P Q R S T U V W Y Z

See also – References

== A ==
- Francis Ellingwood Abbot
- David Abram
- Peter Achinstein
- Marilyn McCord Adams
- Robert Merrihew Adams
- Jane Addams
- Mortimer Adler
- Rogers Albritton
- Amos Bronson Alcott
- Linda Martín Alcoff
- Virgil Aldrich
- Hartley Burr Alexander
- Ismail al-Faruqi
- Diogenes Allen
- Robert F. Almeder
- William Alston
- Alice Ambrose
- Karl Ameriks
- C. Anthony Anderson
- Elizabeth S. Anderson
- Gordon Anderson
- Judith Andre
- Julia Annas
- Ruth Nanda Anshen
- Louise Antony
- Hannah Arendt
- Richard Arneson
- Robert Arp
- Robert Arrington
- Bradley Shavit Artson
- Warren Ashby
- Januarius Jingwa Asongu
- Margaret Atherton
- Robert Audi
- Jody Azzouni

== B ==
- Babette Babich
- Kent Bach
- Max Baginski
- Archie J. Bahm
- Gordon Park Baker
- Lynne Rudder Baker
- Dan Barker
- William Barratt
- William Warren Bartley, III
- Daniel Barwick
- Jacques Barzun
- Monroe Beardsley
- Tom Beauchamp
- Lewis White Beck
- Lawrence C. Becker
- Francis J. Beckwith
- Hugo Adam Bedau
- Nuel Belnap
- Paul Benacerraf
- Gustav Bergmann
- Michael Bergmann
- Arnold Berleant
- Marshall Berman
- Andrew Bernstein
- Mark Bernstein
- Richard J. Bernstein
- Marcus Berquist
- Steven Best
- Nalini Bhushan
- Cristina Bicchieri
- Max Black
- Brand Blanshard
- Ned Block
- Benjamin Paul Blood
- Allan Bloom
- Albert Blumberg
- George Boas
- Chris Bobonich
- Paul Boghossian
- Peter Boghossian
- David Bohm
- Laurence BonJour
- John Elof Boodin
- George Boolos
- Susan Bordo
- Albert Borgmann
- Oets Kolk Bouwsma
- Francis Bowen
- Borden Parker Bowne
- Richard Boyd
- Robert Brandom
- Richard Brandt
- Giannina Braschi
- David Braybrooke
- Daniel Brock
- Baruch Brody
- Stephen Bronner
- Baker Brownell
- William Lowe Bryan
- Scott Buchanan
- Justus Buchler
- Jay Budziszewski
- Nicholas C. Burbules
- Tyler Burge
- Kenneth Burke
- Edwin Arthur Burtt
- Panayot Butchvarov
- Judith Butler
- Charles Butterworth

== C ==
- Mary Whiton Calkins
- J. Baird Callicott
- Donald T. Campbell
- Nicholas Capaldi
- Arthur Caplan
- John Caputo
- Claudia Card
- Richard Carrier
- Noël Carroll
- Paul Carus
- Edward S. Casey
- Charles E. Caton
- Stanley Cavell
- William H. Chamberlin
- Edmond La Beaume Cherbonnier
- James Childress
- Roderick Chisholm
- Noam Chomsky
- Patricia Churchland
- Paul Churchland
- Gordon Haddon Clark
- Kenneth Clatterbaugh
- Roy A. Clouser
- Carl Cohen
- Joshua Cohen
- James F. Conant
- William E. Connolly
- Moncure D. Conway
- Josephus Flavius Cook
- Paul Copan
- James A. Corbett
- Robert S. Corrington
- John Corvino
- William Craig
- William Lane Craig
- Alice Crary
- James Edwin Creighton
- Joseph Cropsey
- Steven Crowell
- Charles Marriot Culver

== D ==
- Norman Daniels
- Arthur Danto
- Donald Davidson
- Michael Davis
- Michael Peter Davis
- Alfred de Grazia
- David DeGrazia
- Grace de Laguna
- Theodore de Laguna
- John Deely
- Daniel Dennett
- Christian de Quincey
- Keith DeRose
- Jan Deutsch
- John Dewey
- Cora Diamond
- Donna Dickenson
- Keith Donnellan
- Elliot N. Dorff
- Bradley Dowden
- Paul Draper
- Theodore Drange
- Burton Dreben
- James Dreier
- Gary Drescher
- Fred Dretske
- Hubert Dreyfus
- Raymond Duncan
- Barrows Dunham
- Will Durant
- Ronald Dworkin

== E ==
- William A. Earle
- John Earman
- Frank Ebersole
- James M. Edie
- Paul Edwards
- Jonathan Edwards
- Albert Einstein
- Loren Eiseley
- Catherine Elgin
- Marc H. Ellis
- Ralph Waldo Emerson
- Mylan Engel
- H. Tristram Engelhardt, Jr.
- E. E. Ericksen
- Stephen L. Esquith
- David Estlund
- Rod L. Evans
- Emmanuel Chukwudi Eze

== F ==
- Marvin Farber
- James E. Faulconer
- Joel Feinberg
- Fred Feldman
- Ernest Fenollosa
- Edward Feser
- Hartry Field
- Arthur Fine
- Kit Fine
- John Martin Fischer
- John Fiske
- Leonard M. Fleck
- Ralph Tyler Flewelling
- Jerry Fodor
- William Fontaine
- Charles Frankel
- William Frankena
- Harry Frankfurt
- Betty Friedan
- Erich Fromm
- Marilyn Frye
- Francis Fukuyama
- Christopher Fynsk

== G ==
- Shaun Gallagher
- David Gauthier
- Norman Geisler
- Michael Gelven
- Tamar Gendler
- Eugene Gendlin
- Alexander George
- Robert P. George
- Emanuel Vogel Gerhart
- Brie Gertler
- Edmund Gettier
- Raymond Geuss
- Alan Gewirth
- Allan Gibbard
- Kahlil Gibran
- Fred Gifford
- Neil Gillman
- René Girard
- Sue Golding
- Alvin Goldman
- Emma Goldman
- Rebecca Goldstein
- Nelson Goodman
- Allan Gotthelf
- Jorge J. E. Gracia
- Kersey Graves
- Maxine Greene
- Marjorie Grene
- David Ray Griffin
- Robert Grudin
- Paul Guyer

== H ==
- Garry L. Hagberg
- Everett W. Hall
- Manly Palmer Hall
- Philip Hallie
- Jean Elizabeth Hampton
- Norwood Russell Hanson
- Sandra Harding
- John E. Hare
- Gilbert Harman
- Errol Harris
- Leonard Harris
- Sam Harris
- William Torrey Harris
- Sally Haslanger
- Robert S. Hartman
- Charles Hartshorne
- Donald West Harward
- William Hasker
- John Haugeland
- Spencer Heath
- John Heil
- Laurens Perseus Hickok
- Stephen Hicks
- Kathleen Higgins
- Marian Hillar
- William Hirstein
- William Ernest Hocking
- Eric Hoffer
- Douglas Hofstadter
- Arthur F. Holmes
- Gerald Holton
- Sidney Hook
- Brad Hooker
- bell hooks
- John Hospers
- Vernon Howard
- George Holmes Howison
- Elbert Hubbard
- Michael Huemer
- Colin Hughes
- David Hull
- Hans-Hermann Hoppe

== I ==
- Peter van Inwagen

== J ==
- William James
- Fredric Jameson
- Martin Jay
- Nancy S. Jecker
- Thomas Jefferson
- Alexander Bryan Johnson
- David Alan Johnson
- Mark Johnson
- Rufus Jones
- Edward Jones-Imhotep

== K ==
- John Kaag
- Shelly Kagan
- Horace Kallen
- Frances Kamm
- Robert Kane
- Abraham Kaplan
- David Kaplan
- Mordecai Kaplan
- Jerrold Katz
- Peter Kaufmann
- Walter Kaufmann
- R.P. Kaushik
- Sam Keen
- David Kelley
- Cassius Jackson Keyser
- Jaegwon Kim
- Stanton Davis Kirkham
- Patricia Kitcher
- Jacob Klein
- Peter D. Klein
- Joshua Knobe
- Ned Kock
- David Koepsell
- David Kolb
- Robert Koons
- Hilary Kornblith
- Christine Korsgaard
- Matthew Kramer
- Michael Krausz
- Peter Kreeft
- Saul Kripke
- J Krishnamurti
- Mark Kuczewski
- Thomas Samuel Kuhn
- Paul Kurtz

== L ==
- George Trumbull Ladd
- Grace de Laguna
- Corliss Lamont
- Mark Lance
- Charles Lane
- William Lane Craig
- Susanne Langer
- Charles Larmore
- Jonathan Lear
- Keith Lehrer
- Brian Leiter
- James G. Lennox
- Isaac Levi
- Michael Levin
- Clarence Irving Lewis
- David Kellogg Lewis
- Mark Lilla
- Hilde Lindemann
- Alphonso Lingis
- Leonard Linsky
- Matthew Lipman
- Alfred Henry Lloyd
- Elisabeth Lloyd
- Alain LeRoy Locke
- Loren Lomasky
- Max Freedom Long
- Helen Longino
- William Lycan
- Helen Lynd

== M ==
- Dwight Macdonald
- Tibor R. Machan
- Alasdair MacIntyre
- Louis H. Mackey
- Ruth Macklin
- James Madison
- Robert Magliola
- Norman Malcolm
- David Manley
- Jesse Mann
- Ruth Barcan Marcus
- Joseph Margolis
- Don Marquis
- Erwin Marquit
- Bill Martin
- Donald A. Martin
- Everett Dean Martin
- Michael Martin
- Richard Milton Martin
- Benson Mates
- Gareth Matthews
- George I. Mavrodes
- Todd May
- Ernst W. Mayr
- Thomas A. McCarthy
- Ron McClamrock
- John H. McClendon
- Janet McCracken
- Evander Bradley McGilvary
- Leemon McHenry
- Terence McKenna
- Richard McKeon
- Jeff McMahan
- William McNeill
- George Herbert Mead
- Jack Meiland
- Alfred Mele
- Stephen Menn
- Franklin Merrell-Wolff
- Trenton Merricks
- Leonard B. Meyer
- Stephen C. Meyer
- Sidney Edward Mezes
- John William Miller
- Mitchell Miller
- Richard W. Miller
- Elijah Millgram
- Ruth Millikan
- Philip Mirowski
- Carl Mitcham
- Oscar Howard Mitchell (October 4, 1851 - March 29, 1889)
- Sandra Mitchell
- Ann M. Mongoven
- Richard Montague
- William Pepperell Montague
- Ernest Addison Moody
- Addison Webster Moore
- Charles A. Moore
- Paul Elmer More
- J. P. Moreland
- John Henry Morgan
- Sidney Morgenbesser
- Charles W. Morris
- Christopher W. Morris
- Thomas V. Morris
- Paul Moser
- Athanasios Moulakis
- V. Y. Mudimbe

== N ==
- Ernest Nagel
- Thomas Nagel
- Debra Nails
- Louis Narens
- Jacob Needleman
- John Neihardt
- Jamie Lindemann Nelson
- Michael P. Nelson
- Jay Newman
- Shaun Nichols
- Jeffrey Nielsen
- Richard Thomas Nolan
- Calvin Normore
- David L. Norton
- Michael Novak
- Claude Nowell
- Robert Nozick
- Martha Nussbaum

== O ==
- James Otteson

== P ==
- Thomas Paine
- George Herbert Palmer
- Thomas Pangle
- George Pappas
- Leonard Peikoff
- Charles Sanders Peirce
- Gregory Pence
- Stephen Pepper
- Ralph Barton Perry
- Robert B. Pippin
- Robert M. Pirsig
- Walter B. Pitkin
- Alvin Plantinga
- Richard Popkin
- Richard Posner
- Robert M. Price
- Harry Prosch
- Hilary Putnam
- Ruth Anna Putnam

== Q ==
- Willard Van Orman Quine

== R ==
- James Rachels
- John Herman Randall, Jr.
- Ayn Rand
- Robert Bruce Raup
- Jerome Ravetz
- Heidi Ravven
- John Rawls
- Frederick Rauscher
- George Lansing Raymond
- Michael C. Rea
- William L. Reese
- Tom Regan
- Victor Reppert
- Hans Reichenbach
- Nicholas Rescher
- Philip H. Rhinelander
- Adrienne Rich
- William J. Richardson
- Laurence Rickels
- Isaac Woodbridge Riley
- James Robb
- Daniel N. Robinson
- Rick Roderick
- Bernard Rollin
- Holmes Rolston III
- Avital Ronell
- Richard Rorty
- Stanley Rosen
- Alexander Rosenberg
- Jay Rosenberg
- Eugen Rosenstock-Huessy
- David M. Rosenthal
- Stephen David Ross
- Gian-Carlo Rota
- Murray Rothbard
- William L. Rowe
- Josiah Royce
- Dagobert David Runes
- Michael Ruse
- David Rynin
- Ravi Zacharias

== S ==
- William S. Sahakian
- Paul Saka
- John Sallis
- Nathan Salmon
- Michael Sandel
- Ellis Sandoz
- David H. Sanford
- Larry Sanger
- George Santayana
- Crispin Sartwell
- Jennifer Saul
- Geoffrey Sayre-McCord
- Kenneth M. Sayre
- T.M. Scanlon
- Diana Schaub
- Tommie Shelby
- Naomi Scheman
- Theodore Schick
- Tad Schmaltz
- David Schmidtz
- J. B. Schneewind
- Herbert Schneider
- Mark Schroeder (philosopher)
- Harold M. Schulweis
- Alfred Schütz
- Lisa H. Schwartzman
- David Schweickart
- John Searle
- Roy Wood Sellars
- Wilfrid Sellars
- Jeremy J. Shapiro
- Michael J. Shapiro
- Scott J. Shapiro
- Stewart Shapiro
- William Shaw
- George Sher
- Warren Shibles
- Sydney Shoemaker
- Richard Shusterman
- Hugh J. Silverman
- Edgar A. Singer, Jr.
- Irving Singer
- David Skrbina
- Brian Skyrms
- Barry Smith
- George H. Smith
- Quentin Smith
- Tara Smith
- T. V. Smith
- Wolfgang Smith
- Raymond Smullyan
- Joseph D. Sneed
- Laura J. Snyder
- Scott Soames
- Alan Soble
- Robert C. Solomon
- Joseph B. Soloveitchik
- Tamler Sommers
- Frederick Sontag
- Pitirim Sorokin
- David Sosa
- Ernest Sosa
- Lysander Spooner
- Elmer Sprague
- Robert Stalnaker
- Lawrence Stepelevich
- Charles Stevenson
- Stephen Stich
- Leo Strauss
- David Strong
- Barry Stroud
- Peter Suber
- William Graham Sumner
- Frederick Suppe
- Patrick Suppes

== T ==
- William W. Tait
- Nassim Nicholas Taleb
- Richard Tarnas
- Alfred I. Tauber
- Ken Taylor
- Mark C. Taylor
- Paul Taylor
- Richard Charles Taylor
- Richard Clyde Taylor
- Neil Tennant
- Larry Temkin
- Eugene Thacker
- Irving Thalberg, Jr.
- Laurence Thomas
- Paul B. Thompson
- Iain Thomson
- Judith Jarvis Thomson
- Henry David Thoreau
- Paul Tillich
- Samuel Martin Thompson
- Samuel Todes
- Michael Tooley
- Benjamin Tucker
- Anna-Teresa Tymieniecka

== U ==
- Robert Ulanowicz
- Peter Unger
- Wilbur Marshall Urban

== V ==
- William F. Vallicella
- Paul van Buren
- Bas van Fraassen
- Peter van Inwagen
- Achille Varzi
- Henry Babcock Veatch
- J. David Velleman
- Eric Voegelin
- Alice von Hildebrand

== W ==
- James D. Wallace
- Kendall Walton
- Mary Anne Warren
- Carl Watner
- Alan Watts
- Brian Weatherson
- David Weinberger
- Jack Russell Weinstein
- Paul Weiss
- Morris Weitz
- Cornel West
- Anthony Weston
- Jonathan Westphal
- Gregory Wheeler
- Morton White
- Alfred North Whitehead
- Walt Whitman
- Dan Wikler
- Ken Wilber
- John Daniel Wild
- Dallas Willard
- William Mackintire Salter
- Michael Williams
- Bruce Wilshire
- Robert Anton Wilson
- William J. Winslade
- Rasmus Gronfeldt Winther
- Susan Wolf
- Robert Paul Wolff
- Nicholas Wolterstorff
- Paul Woodruff
- Chauncey Wright

== Y ==
- Stephen Yablo
- Keith Yandell
- Igor Yefimov
- Arthur M. Young
- Iris Marion Young

== Z ==
- Naomi Zack
- Linda Trinkaus Zagzebski
- John Zerzan
- Paul Ziff
- Dean Zimmerman
- Michael E. Zimmerman

== See also ==
- American philosophy
- List of Jewish American philosophers
- List of African American philosophers
- List of philosophers
