= William W. Tait =

American philosopher (1929–2024)

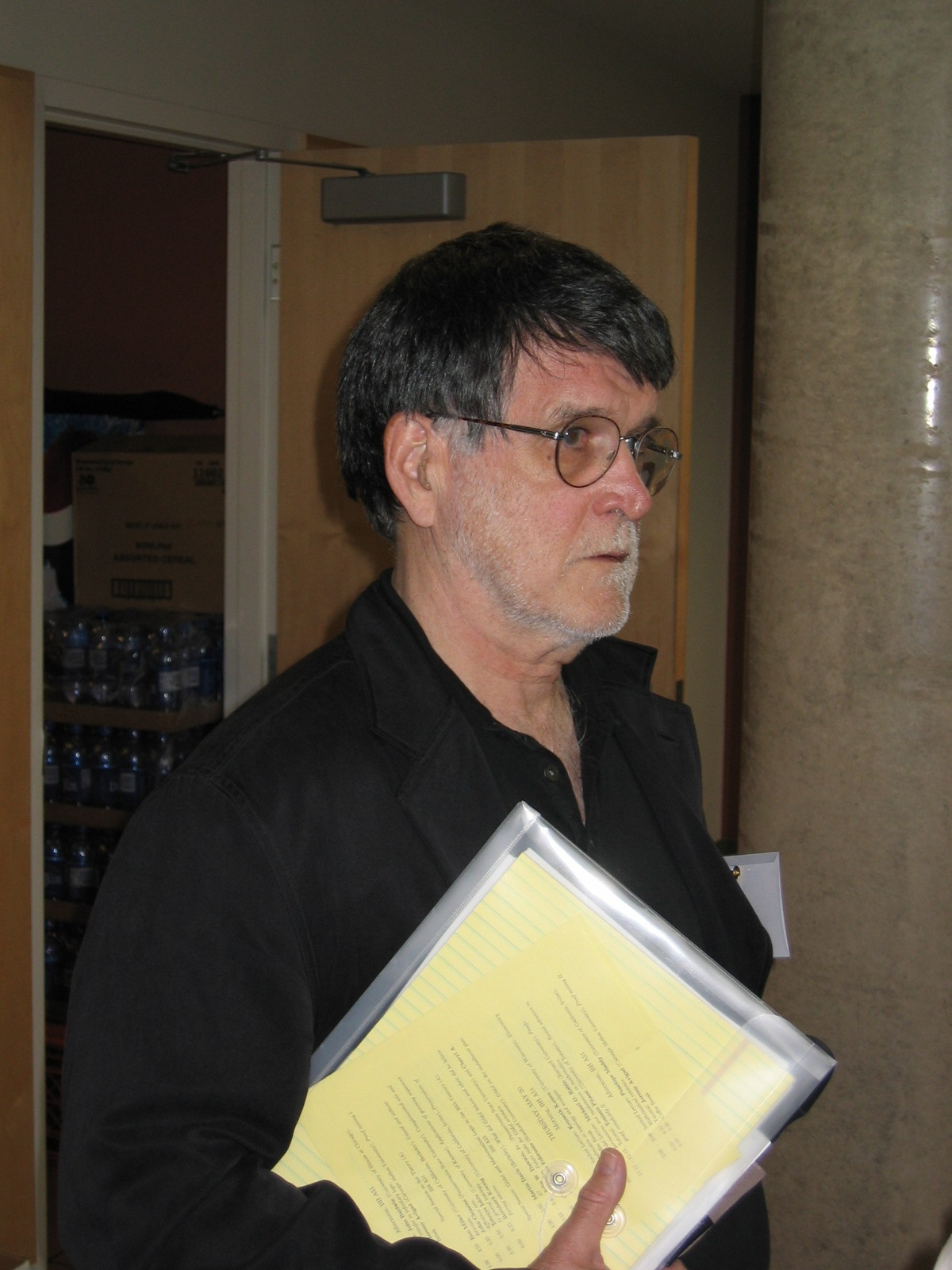
Tait in 2004

William Walker Tait (January 22, 1929 – March 15, 2024) was an American philosopher. He was emeritus professor of philosophy at the University of Chicago, where he served as a faculty member from 1972 to 1996, and as department chair from 1981 to 1987.

== Life and career ==
Tait received his B.A. from Lehigh University in 1952, and his Ph.D. from Yale University in 1958. Frederic Fitch served as his doctoral advisor.

Prior to teaching at Chicago he held positions at Stanford University from 1958 to 1964, the University of Illinois at Chicago from 1965 to 1971, and the University of Aarhus from 1971 to 1972. In 1966, he signed a tax resistance vow to protest the Vietnam War. In 2002, he was elected as a Fellow of the American Academy of Arts and Sciences.

Tait died in Naperville, Illinois on March 15, 2024, at the age of 95.

== Publications ==
- Early analytic philosophy : Frege, Russell, Wittgenstein : essays in honor of Leonard Linsky / edited by William W. Tait. Chicago, Ill. : Open Court, c1997. vii, 291 p. : ill.; 24 cm. ISBN 0-8126-9343-4 (cloth : alk. paper), ISBN 0-8126-9344-2 (pbk. : alk. paper)
- Tait, William W. The provenance of pure reason : essays in the philosophy of mathematics and its history / William Tait. Oxford; New York : Oxford University Press, c2005. viii, 332 p. : ill.; 25 cm. ISBN 0-19-514192-X
- Tait, William W. (1967). "Intensional interpretation of functionals of finite type I". Journal of Symbolic Logic. 32 (2): 198–212. doi:10.2307/2271658. JSTOR 2271658. S2CID 9569863.
- Tait, William W. (1981). "Finitism". The Journal of Philosophy. 78 (9): 524–546. doi:10.2307/2026089. JSTOR 2026089.
- Tait, William W. (June 2012). "Primitive Recursive Arithmetic and its Role in the Foundations of Arithmetic: Historical and Philosophical Reflections" (PDF). Epistemology versus Ontology. pp. 161–180. doi:10.1007/978-94-007-4435-6_8. ISBN 978-94-007-4434-9.

== See also ==
- American philosophy
- List of American philosophers
