= A. W. Moore =

A.W. Moore may refer to:

- Adolphus Warburton Moore (1841–1887), British civil servant and mountaineer
- Arthur William Moore (1853–1909), Manx historian, folklorist and politician
- Addison Webster Moore (1866–1930), American pragmatist philosopher
- A. W. Moore (philosopher) (born 1956), British philosopher

== See also ==
- Moore (surname)
