= Chris Bobonich =

American philosopher

Christopher Bobonich
- Born: 1960 (age 65–66); Philadelphia metropolitan area, U.S.

Education
- Education: University of California, Berkeley
- Doctoral advisor: Alan Code

Philosophical work
- School: Ancient Greek philosophy
- Main interests: Plato

Christopher Bobonich (born February 8, 1960) is an American philosopher and a leading scholar of Ancient Greek philosophy, especially known for his work on Plato's Laws. He is currently Clarence Irving Lewis Professor of Philosophy and Professor of Classics (by courtesy) at Stanford University.

== Early life and education ==
Bobonich was born on February 8, 1960, in the Philadelphia metropolitan area. He completed his BA in government at Harvard University in 1981. He then went on to complete his MPhil (1983) in philosophy at the University of Cambridge, and his PhD in philosophy at the University of California, Berkeley (1990) under Alan Code, now his colleague at Stanford.

== Career ==
He taught first at the University of Chicago, and, since 1996, at Stanford University.

== See also ==
- American philosophy
- List of American philosophers

== Bibliography ==
- Plato's Laws: A Critical Guide (ed), (Cambridge Critical Guides), Cambridge University Press, 2010
- Akrasia in Greek Philosophy: From Socrates to Plotinus (ed), (with P. Destrée), Brill Publishers, 2007
- Plato's Utopia Recast: His Later Ethics and Politics, Oxford University Press, 2002
