= Steven Crowell =

American philosopher

Steven Galt Crowell (/ˈkroʊəl/; born 1953) is an American philosopher and professor emeritus at Rice University, where he taught from 1983 to 2022.

Crowell earned an MA in philosophy from Northern Illinois University in 1976, where his thesis was supervised by the Heidegger scholar Michael Gelven. He subsequently earned his PhD in philosophy from Yale University in 1981. His work has largely focused on twentieth-century European philosophy, including phenomenology, existentialism, hermeneutics, and post-structuralism.

== See also ==
- American philosophy
- List of American philosophers

== Bibliography ==
- Normativity and Phenomenology in Husserl and Heidegger (Cambridge University Press, 2013)
- Transcendental Heidegger (Stanford University Press, 2007)
- Husserl, Heidegger, and the Space of Meaning: Paths Toward Transcendental Phenomenology (Evanston: Northwestern University Press, 2002)
- The Reach of Reflection: Issues for Phenomenology's Second Century, ed. Steven Crowell, Lester Embree, and Samuel Julian (Electron Press, 2001: www.electronpress.com)
- The Prism of the Self: Philosophical Essays in Honor of Maurice Natanson, ed. Steven Galt Crowell (Dordrecht: Kluwer, 1995)
- Nietzsche's View of Truth, International Studies in Philosophy XIX/2 (1987), 3–18.
