= Rodney Evans =

Rodney or Rod Evans may refer to:

- Rodney J. Evans (1948–1969), Medal of Honor recipient, killed in action during the Vietnam War
- Rodney Evans (filmmaker) (born 1971), American filmmaker and lecturer
- Rodney Evans (footballer) (born 1946), Australian rules footballer for Richmond
- Rod Evans (born 1947), English singer
- Rod L. Evans, American academic
