= Ken Taylor (philosopher) =

American philosopher (1954–2019)

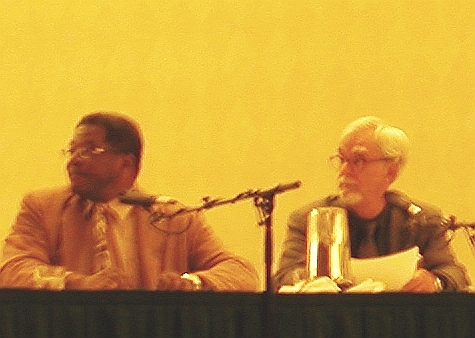
- John Perry and Kenneth Taylor at Philosophy Talk
- Born: Kenneth Allen Taylor; November 4, 1954; Sandusky, Ohio, U.S.
- Died: December 2, 2019 (aged 65); Los Altos, California, U.S.

Education
- Education: University of Notre Dame (A.B., 1977); University of Chicago (PhD, 1984)

Philosophical work
- Era: 20th-century philosophy
- Region: Western philosophy
- School: Analytic philosophy
- Main interests: Philosophy of language, philosophy of mind

Ken Taylor (Kenneth Allen Taylor, November 4, 1954 – December 2, 2019) was an American philosopher and co-host (with John Perry) of the radio program Philosophy Talk.

== Education and career ==
Taylor received his A.B. from the University of Notre Dame in 1977. He received his Ph.D. in 1984 from the University of Chicago, where he completed his dissertation under the supervision of Leonard Linsky. Before coming to Stanford, Taylor taught in the philosophy departments at Rutgers University, University of Maryland at College Park, Wesleyan University, University of North Carolina at Chapel Hill, and Middlebury College.

Taylor chaired the department of philosophy at Stanford University from 2001 to 2009.

He died from a heart attack on December 2, 2019.

== Philosophical work ==
Taylor specialized in philosophy of language and philosophy of mind. Taylor's interests included semantics, reference, naturalism, and relativism. He authored numerous articles, which appeared in journals such as Noûs, Philosophical Studies, and Philosophy and Phenomenological Research. Taylor also published three books: Truth and Meaning: An Introduction to the Philosophy of Language (Blackwell Publishers), Reference and the Rational Mind (CSLI Publications), and Meaning Diminished: Toward Metaphysically Modest Semantics (Oxford University Press).

== Bibliography ==
- Taylor, Kenneth (1998). Truth and Meaning: An Introduction to the Philosophy of Language. Oxford: Blackwell Publishers. ISBN 1-57718-048-8.
- Taylor, Kenneth (2003). Reference and the Rational Mind. Stanford: CSLI Publications. ISBN 1-57586-431-2.
- Taylor, Kenneth (2019). Meaning Diminished: Toward Metaphysically Modest Semantics. Oxford: Oxford University Press. ISBN 9780198803447.

== See also ==
- American philosophy
- List of American philosophers
