= David Manley =

David Manley may refer to:

- David Manley (philosopher), American philosopher
- David Manley (artist), British artist, educationalist and arts administrator
