= Ann M. Mongoven =

American philosopher

Ann M. Mongoven is an American philosophy professor and medical ethicist. She earned her Ph.D. in religious studies/ethics from the University of Virginia in 1996 and a M.P.H. from the Johns Hopkins University Bloomberg School of Public Health in 2006. Mongoven taught courses at Indiana University/Bloomington before going on to teach at Michigan State University where she currently holds a dual appointment with the philosophy department and the Center for Ethics and Humanities in the Life Sciences. Mongoven is also a Michigan State University Lilly Teaching Fellow and was an ethics consultant for the United States Department of Health and Human Services.

== Contributions to philosophy ==
Dr. Mongoven's work primarily focuses on how symbolic frameworks influence the field of bioethics and public health policy. She is also interested in "public health ethics, justice in health care, organ donation/transplantation, challenges of democratic deliberation on bioethical issues, and challenges of diversity in health care". Her current work is centered on what virtues are necessary for democratic deliberation, biobanking, and how preparedness and response in public health is symbolically framed.

== Professional publications ==
Mongoven has published several professional papers dealing with a broad range of topics in health care ethics in journals such as The Journal of Medicine and Philosophy, The Journal of the Society of Christian Ethics, Cambridge Quarterly of Health Care Ethics, and Bioethics. In addition, she is the author of the book Just Love: Transforming Civic Virtue published by Indiana University Press. She also contributed to the books Mother Troubles: The Legacy of Sara Ruddick and Caring Well: Religion, Narrative, and Health Care Ethics.

== Awards and distinctions ==
In addition to being an ethics consultant for the United States Department of Health and Human Services and a Michigan State University Lilly Teaching Fellow, Mongoven was also awarded the Public Health Preparedness Fellowship by Johns Hopkins University in 2005, the Abe Fellowship for Cross-Cultural Policy Studies by the Japan Foundation Center for Global Partnership/Social Science Research Council in 2003, and the Women's Studies in Religion Fellowship by the Harvard University Divinity School.

== Selected works ==
- Just Love: Transforming Civic Virtue. Bloomington: Indiana University Press; 2009.
- "The War on Terror and the War on Disease: a Dangerous Metaphorical Nexus?" Cambridge Q Healthcare Ethics. 2006;15(4):403-16.
- "Duties to Stakeholders Amidst Pressure from Shareholders: Lessons from an Advisory Panel on Transplant Policy." Bioethics. 2003;17(4):319-40.
- "Sharing Our Body and Blood: Organ Donation and Feminist Critiques of Sacrifice." J Med Phil. 2003;28(1):89-114.

== See also ==
- American philosophy
- American philosophers
- Medical ethics
