= Michael Davis (philosopher) =

American philosopher (born 1943)

- Born: February 6, 1943 (age 82)
- Education: BA (philosophy), Western Reserve University, 1965; MA (philosophy), University of Michigan; PhD (philosophy), University of Michigan, 1972; Law, University of Michigan, 1976–1977
- Occupation: Professor of philosophy
- Employer: Illinois Institute of Technology
- Known for: Specializes in professional ethics, philosophy of law, political philosophy
- Website: Homepage

Michael Davis (born 6 February 1943) is an American philosopher specializing in professional ethics. He is Professor of Philosophy at the Illinois Institute of Technology, and Senior Fellow at its Center for the Study of Ethics in the Professions.

Davis is the author of several books, including Accountability in the Professions (1995), Profession, Code, and Ethics (2002), and Engineering Ethics (2005).

== Background ==
Davis received his PhD in 1972 from the University of Michigan for a dissertation entitled "Representation and Consent: An Inquiry into the Foundations of Political Obligation." Before moving to the Illinois Institute of Technology in 1986, he taught at the University of Illinois at Chicago, Illinois State University, and Case Western Reserve University.

== Research interests ==
Davis's work in engineering ethics has won him four large grants from the National Science Foundation and an entry in Who's Who in Science and Engineering. His papers on whistleblowing and conflict of interest are often reprinted. He is the author of eight books and almost 200 articles and chapters, and editor (or co-editor) of five other books.

== Bibliography ==
- with Frederick Elliston, Ethics and the Legal Profession (Prometheus Books, 1986)
- To Make the Punishment Fit the Crime (Westview Press, 1992)
- with Elliot D. Cohen, AIDS: Crisis in Professional Ethics (Temple University Press, 1994)
- Accountability in the Professions (1995)
- Justice in the Shadow of Death: Rethinking Capital and Lesser Punishments (Rowman & Littlefield, 1996)
- Thinking like an Engineer (Oxford University Press, 1998)
- Ethics and the University (Routledge, 1999)
- with Andrew Stark, Conflict of Interest in the Professions (Oxford University Press, 2001)
- Profession, Code, and Ethics (Ashgate, 2002)
- Actual Social Contract and Political Obligation (Edwin Mellen Press, 2002)
- Engineering Ethics (Ashgate, 2005)
- Code Writing: How Software Engineering Became a Profession (Center for the Study of Ethics in the Professions, 2007)
- with Elliot D. Cohen and Frederick Elliston, Ethics and the Legal Profession, 2nd ed (Prometheus Book, 2009)
- Thinking like an Engineer: Studies in the Ethics of a Profession (Zhejiang University Press, 2012)
- The Architect’s Professional Ethics: Readings and Problems (forthcoming)

== See also ==
- American philosophy
- List of American philosophers
