= Stephen David Ross =

American philosopher (born 1935)

Stephen David Ross (born 1935) is an American philosopher, currently Distinguished Research Professor of Philosophy, Interpretation, and Culture and of Comparative Literature at Binghamton University. He has published over 30 books in interdisciplinary philosophy, especially on art, literature, ethics, and metaphysics, from American pragmatism through poststructuralism, from human beings to animals and things.

== Biography ==
He was born May 4, 1935, to Allan Ross and Bessie Schlosberg. He studied mathematics at Columbia University, where he received an MA in 1957, and a PhD in philosophy in 1961. He taught philosophy at the University of Wisconsin-Milwaukee and the University of Colorado in Boulder before moving to Binghamton University/State University of New York in 1967. He married Marilyn Gaddis Rose in 1968.

He spent the rest of his teaching career in Binghamton, where he helped create two interdisciplinary PhD programs, one in Philosophy, Literature, and the Theory of Criticism in the Department of Comparative Literature, the second in Philosophy, Interpretation, and Culture (PIC), located first in the Department of Philosophy, later becoming an independent program. He was appointed Distinguished Professor of Philosophy, Interpretation, and Culture and of Comparative Literature in 2006. He is currently Alfred North Whitehead Fellow in the European Graduate School, Saas-Fee, Switzerland. He was editor of the journal International Studies in Philosophy from 1979 to 2011.

== Work ==
His career has been devoted to different possibilities of expressing and living with uncertain beliefs, unsettled experiences, and inexhaustible realities. He has explored different forms of writing and varied terminologies for expressing what resists expression, based on the conviction that such a resistance requires constant vigilance and innovative writing, the constant production and transformation of forms of knowledge, especially including philosophy, whose relations to art, literature, science, and religion enrich it profoundly with novel and imaginative questions and answers.

He began in American pragmatism, reading it to question itself fundamentally and to entail the inexhaustibility of nature and reason, the mysteriousness of things. He wrote several books on ordinality and an ordinal metaphysics, influenced by his mentor, Justus Buchler. He turned then to Alfred North Whitehead and his notion of prehension or perspective. A universe of orders composed of orders composing other orders, of perspectives, is an inexhaustible universe without totality. Everything is limited, including every limit, an inexhaustible play of limit and unlimit.

In 2002 he came to believe that such a sense of inexhaustibility required a very different style of writing, more literary and oblique, and found this in post-Heideggerian writings, especially Michel Foucault, Jacques Derrida, Emmanuel Levinas, and Deleuze and Guattari. The Ring of Representation was written in sonorous and voiced verbs—ringing, sounding—avoiding all forms of the verb "to be" so as to question the question of Being.

An ongoing theme throughout his work was that of an infinite ethics, infinite in each decision and inclusive of all things. This led him to Levinas's notions of betrayal and generosity, two notions that would deeply influence his writing. Betraying contains a double meaning, violation and revelation. He linked it with Anaximander's notion of injustice in all things, later defining it as the nonidentity of every identity with itself, a systematic and pervasive sense of how nature and reason exceed themselves, with evolution a foremost example of the first, art and literature of the second.

This was followed by seven volumes on gifts and generosity, undercutting the sense of possessing and having that color traditional views of knowledge, truth, and being. Then followed explorations of images in philosophy and art, understanding the world as images, a different way of thinking of perspectives. Images proliferate from other images, revealing and betraying them. This double movement of betraying led to books on enchantment and disenchantment, on asking and telling, to a novel, returning to an infinite and inclusive ethics through animals and other things.

These all express a sense of unceasing questioning, and questioning that questioning, that he suggests is profoundly ethical: ethical fullness.

In his recent writings he has turned to poetry.

== Some publications ==
- 2021: Pamphlet on Plenishment, Wars, and Plagues. Kindle Edition, Amazon Publishing
- 2021: Exposition of Plenishment in the Earth, An Ethic of Inclusion, with Appendix on Plague and War, abbreviation and commentary. Kindle Edition, Amazon Publishing
- 2020: Plenishment in the Earth: An Ethic of Inclusion. Kindle Edition, Amazon Publishing
- 2020: The Gift of Property: Having the Good betraying genitivity ecology and economy an ethic of the earth. Kindle Edition, Amazon Publishing
- 2020: A Democracy of Things, An Ethics of Perhaps. Amazon Publishing. North Charleston, SC: Kindle Direct Independent Publishing Platform, Paperback and Kindle edition
- 2019: Betraying Derrida, for Life Perhaps… ’ Kindle Edition, Amazon Publishing
- 2018: The Gift of Beauty: The Good as Art. Kindle edition. Amazon Publishing
- 2018: Perspective in Whitehead’s Metaphysics. Kindle edition. Amazon Publishing
- 2018: Invitation to Ethical Fullness: Questions Without Answers. Amazon Publishing
- 2018: A Life in Question, Amazon Publishing
- 2017: Ethical Fullness: Thinking of Animals, Believing in Things, Amazon Publishing
- 2013: A Philosophy Fiction, Atropos Press
- 2013: Betraying Derrida, for Life, Perhaps, Atropos Press
- 2012: Unsettling: Asking, Telling, Doing, Betraying, Atropos Press, European Graduate School
- 2012: Asking, for Telling, by Doing, As if Betraying, Atropos Press
- 2012: Enchanting: Beyond Disenchantment , SUNY Press
- 2009: Un forgetting: Re calling Time Lost, Global Academic Publishing
- 2008: The World as Aesthetic Phenomenon, Global Academic Publishing
- 2005: The Gift of Self: Shattering, Emptiness, Betrayal, Global Academic Publishing
- 2001: The Gift of Property: Having the Good, Betraying Genitivity, Economy and Ecology: An Ethic of the Earth, SUNY Press
- 1999: The Gift of Kinds: The Good in Abundance: An Ethic of the Earth, SUNY Press
- 1998: The Gift of Touch: Embodying the Good, SUNY Press
- 1997: The Gift of Truth: Gathering the Good, SUNY Press
- 1997: Ideals and Responsibilities: Ethical Judgment and Social Identity, Wadsworth Publishing Company
- 1996: The Gift of Beauty: The Good as Art, SUNY Press
- 1995: Plenishment in the Earth: An Ethic of Inclusion, SUNY Press
- 1994: Locality and Practical Judgment: Charity and Sacrifice, Fordham University Press
- 1994: The Limits of Language, Fordham University Press
- 1993: Injustice and Restitution: The Ordinance of Time, SUNY Press
- 1992: The Ring of Representation, SUNY Press
- 1989: Metaphysical Aporia and Philosophical Heresy, SUNY Press
- 1989: Inexhaustibility and Human Being: An Essay on Locality, Fordham University Press
- 1984: Art and its Significance: an Anthology of Aesthetic Theory (editor), SUNY Press; 2nd ed in 1987, 3rd ed in 1994
- 1983: Perspective in Whitehead's Metaphysics, SUNY Press
- 1982: A Theory of Art: Inexhaustibility by Contrast, SUNY Press
- 1981: Learning and Discovery, Gordon and Breach
- 1981: Philosophical Mysteries, SUNY Press
- 1980: Transition to an Ordinal Metaphysics, SUNY Press
- 1972: Moral Decision, Freeman, Cooper & Co.
- 1973: The Nature of Moral Responsibility, Wayne State University Press
- 1971: The Scientific Process, Martinus Nijhoff Press
- 1969: Literature and Philosophy: An Analysis of the Philosophical Novel, Appleton-Century-Crofts
- 1966: The Meaning of Education, Martinus Nijhoff Press

== Poetry ==
- 2022: It: an ethic of inclusion . Paperback and Kindle edition, Amazon Publishing.
- 2022: Philosophy Poems: collection one . Paperback and Kindle edition, Amazon Publishing
- 2023: Poems of Disaster: philosophy poems, collection two . Paperback and Kindle edition, Amazon Publishing
- 2023: Plenishing the Earth: poems of inexhaustible things in their abundance and fullness. Paperback and Kindle edition, Amazon Publishing
- 2024: Love in Truth: one of the books in the library . Paperback and Kindle edition, Amazon Publishing

== Influences ==
- Justus Buchler
- Jacques Derrida
- John Dewey
- Michel Foucault
- Martin Heidegger
- Luce Irigaray
- Emmanuel Levinas
- Alfred North Whitehead

== See also ==
- American philosophy
- List of American philosophers
