= Fred Gifford =

Fred Gifford (a.k.a.) Freddy Giff is a professor and the associate chair of the philosophy department at Michigan State University. He earned his Ph.D. at the University of Pittsburgh in 1984 and currently teaches courses on philosophy of technology, ethics and development, ethics and healthcare, and biotechnology.

== Contributions to Philosophy ==
Gifford's work focuses on philosophy of science, philosophy of medicine, bioethics, healthcare ethics, and ethics and development. He co-founded (with Stephen L. Esquith) the ethics and development graduate specialization at Michigan State University and he is particularly active within the current debate in development ethics.

== Professional Publications ==
Gifford is the author of over thirty peer-reviewed publications including “Bioethics in Costa Rica: Origins and Challenges," "Ethics of Research: Protection of Human Subjects," and the book co-edited with Stephen L. Esquith entitled Capabilities, Power, and Institutions: Towards a More Critical Development Ethics.

== Selected works ==
Co-editor with Stephen L. Esquith of Capabilities, Power, and Institutions: Towards a More Critical Development Ethics The Pennsylvania State University Press, (2010)

Fred Gifford and Ana Rodriguez, “Bioethics in Costa Rica: Origins and Challenges”, in Catherine Myser, ed., The Social Functions of Bioethics Around the Globe, Oxford University Press, 2010.

“Ethical Issues in Enhancement Research”, in Journal of Evolution and Technology Volume 17, number 2, May 2008.

“Ethics of Research: Protection of Human Subjects”, in the Encyclopedia of Life Sciences, http://www.els.net, London: Nature Publishing Group, Macmillan Reference Limited. 2008. (This is a revision of my article first published in March, 2001.)

“Pulling the Plug on Clinical Equipoise: A Critique of Miller and Weijer”, Kennedy Institute of Ethics Journal, Sept. 2007.

“So-Called “Clinical Equipoise” and the Argument from Design”, Journal of Medicine and Philosophy v. 32, n. 2, 2007, pp. 135–150.

“Taking Equipoise Seriously: The Failure of Clinical or Community Equipoise to Resolve the Ethical Dilemmas in Randomized Clinical Trials”, in H. Kincaid & J. McKitrick (Eds.), Establishing Medical Reality: Essays in the Metaphysics and Epistemology of Biomedical Science. New York: Springer, 2007, pp. 135–150.
