= Alan Code =

American philosopher

- Born: Alan Dodd Code; 1951 (age 74–75)

Education
- Education: University of Wisconsin–Madison (BA, MA, PhD)
- Doctoral advisor: Terry Penner

Philosophical work
- Era: Contemporary philosophy
- Region: Western philosophy
- School: Analytic philosophy
- Institutions: University of British Columbia; University of California, Berkeley; University of Michigan; Ohio State University; Rutgers University; Stanford University
- Doctoral students: Sally Haslanger
- Main interests: Aristotle, Ancient Greek philosophy

Alan Dodd Code (born 1951) is an American philosopher. He is Ward W. and Priscilla B. Woods Professor of Philosophy and Professor of Classics (by courtesy) at Stanford University, and also Professor Emeritus of Philosophy at UC Berkeley. He is a leading scholar of ancient Greek philosophy, especially well known for his articles on Aristotle's metaphysics, science, and logic.

== Education and career ==
Code did his BA, MA, and PhD at the University of Wisconsin–Madison, writing his dissertation under Terry Penner. Before taking up a position at Stanford in 2011, he was Board of Governors Professor of Philosophy at Rutgers University. Prior to that, he taught for many years at Berkeley, and also at the University of Michigan and Ohio State University.

He was elected a Fellow of the American Academy of Arts and Sciences in 2013.

== Philosophical work ==
Some of Code's papers are considered centrally important to the understanding of Aristotle's metaphysics and philosophy of science. He has commented on, clarified and extended the work of such eminent scholars as G. E. L. Owen and Montgomery Furth.

== See also ==
- American philosophy
- List of American philosophers
