= Judith Andre =

American philosopher

- Title: Professor of Philosophy

Academic background
- Education: Michigan State University

Academic work
- Institutions: Old Dominion University; Michigan State University
- Main interests: Ethical Issues in Global Public Health, Ethics and Development, animal welfare and Virtue ethics

Judith Andre is a philosophy professor (retired) and virtue theorist. She earned her Ph.D. at Michigan State University in 1979 and has taught courses on ethical issues in global public health, ethics and development, animal welfare, and virtue theory at Old Dominion University and Michigan State University before retiring.

== Contributions to philosophy ==
Andre got her BA (English Literature) 1967 at Viterbo College, and an MA and PhD (both Philosophy) at Michigan State University in 1970 and 1979 respectively.

Dr. Andre's work focuses on ethical issues brought about by globalization. She is especially interested in issues of public health in this broader context and often utilizes virtue theory when dealing with questions such as: What should be for sale?; Should we sell organs?; Should we sell wombs? For Andre, globalization brings about both "new moral challenges" and "new intellectual resources" from which to address these questions. She also looks at the connections between economics and health. These current interests have grown out of earlier work including "Nagel, Williams and Moral Luck," and "Blocked Exchanges: A Taxonomy".

== Selected publications ==
She is the author of over thirty peer-reviewed publications including "The Virtue of Honoring Oneself", "Disease" and the books Bioethics as Practice and Worldly Virtue.

== Awards and distinctions ==
Andre was awarded a Rockefeller Fellowship in 1990. In addition, she was invited to be a panel member at the 9th World Congress of Bioethics in Rijeka, Croatia and presented at the Institute for Biomedical Law and Ethics at the Ewha Womans University in Seoul, South Korea. She also won the Outstanding University Woman Faculty Award presented by the Faculty-Professional Women's Association at Michigan State University.

== See also ==
- American philosophy
- American philosophers
