= Alexander George (philosopher) =

American philosopher

- Born: Manhattan, New York, U.S.

Academic background
- Education: Columbia University (BA); Harvard University (MA, PhD)

Academic work
- Discipline: Philosophy
- Sub-discipline: Philosophy of language Philosophy of mathematics Analytic philosophy
- Institutions: Amherst College

Alexander George is an American philosopher working as a professor of philosophy at Amherst College.

== Career ==
Born and raised in Manhattan, George attended Lycée Français de New York. He received his Bachelor of Arts degree in 1979 from Columbia College and his Master of Arts and PhD from Harvard University in 1981 and 1986, respectively. George was a junior research fellow at New College and Wolfson College, Oxford University. In 2001, he received an honorary A.M. from Amherst College.

== Career ==
George's research interests include philosophy of language, philosophy of mathematics, and the history of analytic philosophy.

George is the founder of AskPhilosophers.org, a website that allows visitors to submit philosophical questions to a panel of professors of philosophy. The site was launched on October 1, 2005. As of October 2010, there have been over 3,250 questions posted and over 4,200 responses. The questions have come from people of all ages and all walks of life, from countries around the world. The purpose of the website is to put the skills of trained philosophers at the service of the public, thereby helping to bridge the gap between the philosophical questions people encounter in everyday life and the answers and ideas that philosophers have come up with over the past 2,500 years. A book of selected questions and answers from the site, What Would Socrates Say?, has been published in many countries.

Alex George's interest in chess problems led him to start the internet forum ChessProblem.net. He has also composed some retroanalytical compositions. With fellow Amherst professor Lawrence Douglas, Professor George publishes humorous pieces in The Chronicle of Higher Education and other publications. Sense and Nonsensibility (ISBN 0-7432-6048-1), a book that pokes gentle fun at the worlds of literature and academia, appeared in 2004.

== Bibliography ==
The Everlasting Check: Hume on Miracles

== See also ==
- American philosophy
- List of American philosophers
