= Archie J. Bahm =

American philosopher

- Born: 21 August 1907
- Died: 12 March 1996 (aged 88)
- Occupation: Prof. at the University of New Mexico

Archie John Bahm (21 August 1907 – 12 March 1996) was an American philosopher and professor of philosophy at the University of New Mexico.

== Biography ==
Bahm served as Acting Chair of the University of New Mexico's Department of Philosophy from 1954 to 1955 and again from 1964 to 1965. He was a member of numerous committees to support and promote the exchange of philosophical ideas and organized the Albuquerque Chapter of the Southwestern Regional American Humanist Association in 1954. He was one of the signers of the Humanist Manifesto. He was also an organizer, past president, and past secretary-treasurer of the New Mexico Philosophical Society.

Bahm in 1933 contributed “A Religious Affirmation” to The New Humanist, listing items that “a person should”:

1. Be creedless; that is, be intelligent enough to make adaptations without dependence upon some formula.
2. Be self-reliant; that is, be not dependent upon supernatural agency for intellectual support or moral guidance.
3. Be critical; that is, question assumptions and seek certitude scientifically.
4. Be tolerant; that is, be open-minded and hold conclusions tentatively.
5. Be active; that is, live today and grow by exercising his capacities.
6. Be efficient; that is, accomplish the most with the least effort.
7. Be versatile; that is, vary his interests to attain a variety of interesting thoughts.
8. Be cooperative; that is, find some of his satisfactions in social activities.
9. Be appreciative; that is, make the present enjoyable by his attitude.
10. Be idealistic; that is, create and live by ideals which he finds inspiring.

== Bibliography ==
- Aforismos del Yoga (with Patanjali)
- Axiology: The Science of Values
- Comparative Philosophy: Western, Indian, and Chinese Philosophies Compared
- Comparative Aesthetics
- Computocracy - Government by Computer Users
- Couleurs
- Directory of American Philosophers, 1968-69
- Directory of American Philosophers, 1970-71
- Directory of American Philosophers, 1972-73
- Directory of American Philosophers, 1973-81
- Directory of American Philosophers, 1982-83
- Directory of American Philosophers, 1984-91
- Directory of American Philosophers, 1992-93
- Directory of American Philosophers, 1994-2000
- Directory of American Philosophers 2000-2001
- Directory of American Philosophers, 2002-2003
- Epistemology: Theory of Knowledge
- Ethics: The Science of Oughtness
- Ethics as a Behavioral Science
- Executive Yoga
- The Heart of Confucius, Interpretations of Genuine Living and Great Wisdom - with sixteen Ming Dynasty Confucian Prints
- Metaphysics: An Introduction
- Organicism: Origin and Development, Life and Publications of the Author
- The Philosopher's World Model
- Philosophy: An Introduction
- Philosophy of the Buddha
- Polarity, Dialectic, and Organicity
- The Specialist: His Philosophy, His Disease, His Cure
- Tao Teh King by Lao Tzu
- What Is Philosophy?
- What Makes Acts Right?
- Why Be Moral?
- The World's Living Religions
- Yoga for Business Executives and Professional People
- Yoga Union with the Ultimate
- Yoga Sutras of Patanjali

== See also ==
- American philosophy
- List of American philosophers
