= Virgil Aldrich =

American philosopher of art, language, and religion

Virgil Charles Aldrich
- Born: 13 September 1903; Narsinghpur, India
- Died: 28 May 1998 (aged 94); Salt Lake City, Utah, United States
- Spouse: Louise Hafliger
- Children: David Virgil Aldrich
- Awards: L.H.D. from Ohio Wesleyan University and Kenyon College

Education
- Education: Ohio Wesleyan University, Oxford University, Sorbonne, University of California, Berkeley

Philosophical work
- Era: 20th century
- Region: Western philosophy
- School: Analytic philosophy, Philosophy of art
- Main interests: Philosophy of art, language, religion
- Notable works: Philosophy of Art, The Body of a Person
- Notable ideas: Definitions of vagueness, the distinction between vagueness of symbols and senses

Virgil Charles Aldrich (13 September 1903 in Narsinghpur, India – 28 May 1998 in Salt Lake City, Utah), was an American philosopher of art, language, and religion.

== Early life and education ==
The son of Floyd Clement Aldrich and his wife Ann Hanley, Virgil Aldrich earned his Bachelor of Arts degree at Ohio Wesleyan University in 1925. He studied at Oxford University in 1927 and then went on to earn a Diplôme d'Études Supérieures de Philosophie at the Sorbonne in 1928 before completing his Ph.D. at the University of California, Berkeley in 1931. He married Louise Hafliger on 3 September 1927, and they had one son, David Virgil Aldrich.

== Academic career ==
Aldrich's first academic appointment was his appointment as an instructor in philosophy at Rice University in 1931 and Sterling Fellow at Yale University in 1931–1932. Promoted to assistant professor, he remained at Rice until 1942, when he was appointed visiting professor at Columbia University from 1942 to 1946. Appointed professor of philosophy at Kenyon College in 1946, he remained there until 1965, serving as a visiting professor at Brown University in 1962–1963. In 1965, he became a professor of philosophy at the University of North Carolina at Chapel Hill, where he remained until his retirement in 1972. On his retirement, he moved to Salt Lake City, Utah, where he became an adjunct professor at the University of Utah.

Aldrich served as Director of the Kyoto American Studies Institute in Japan and for short periods was visiting professor at Harvard University, the University of Michigan, and the University of Texas. He served as trustee and president of the American Society of Aesthetics and president of American Philosophical Association.

== "Some Meanings of Vague" (1937) ==
In his article "Some Meanings of Vague", Aldrich puts forth a series of definitions of vague objects and sensum and then argues that any empiricist must account for vague sensum every bit as much as clear sensum, without skirting the issue. He takes there to be many kinds of vagueness—importantly, there is the vagueness of symbols and vagueness of senses. Here, symbols are anything that is used to refer to, including verbal words, signs, pictures, and more. Vagueness regarding symbols can be the same as the vagueness which regards the senses. There can, additionally, be vagueness of the practices surrounding the use of the symbol to refer. These, he suggests, should be avoided.

== Honors ==
- L.H.D., Ohio Wesleyan University, 1963
- L.H.D., Kenyon College, 1972

== Writings ==
Books:

- Language and philosophy ([Kyoto]: Kyoto American Studies Seminar, 1955)
- Philosophy of Art, (Englewood Cliffs, N.J., Prentice-Hall, 1963)
- The Body of a Person, (Lanham, MD: University Press of America, 1988)
- My Century, Nantucket, Massachusetts, EditAndPublishYourBook.com/Lulu, 20 November 2010
- Philosophical Reflections, Nantucket, Massachusetts, EditAndPublishYourBook.com/Lulu,

11 December 2010

Contributions:

- Readings in Philosophical Analysis (1951)
- Reflections on Art (1958)
- Religious Experience and Truth (1961)
- Faith and the Philosophers (1962)
- World Perspectives on Philosophy (1967)
- "Design, Composition, and Symbol", The Journal of Aesthetics and Art Criticism (Vol. 27, No. 4, Summer, 1969), pp. 379–388.
- Studies in philosophy: a symposium on Gilbert Ryle, Edited by Konstantin Kolenda. (Houston, Tex. : William Marsh Rice University, 1972)
- "Pictures and Persons" in Review of Metaphysics (1975)
- "Description and expression: Physicalism restricted," Inquiry vol. 20 (1977), pp. 149–164.
- Falling in love with wisdom: American philosophers talk about their calling, edited by David D. Karnos, Robert G. Shoemaker. (New York : Oxford University Press, 1993

Festschrift

- Body, mind, and method: essays in honor of Virgil C. Aldrich edited by Donald F. Gustafson and Bangs L. Tapscott. (Dordrecht and Boston: D. Reidel Pub. Co., 1979)

== See also ==
- American philosophy
- List of American philosophers

== Sources ==
- University of Utah Library
- Marquis Who's Who
