= Gordon Anderson (author) =

American philosopher

Gordon L. Anderson is an American philosopher, a publishing executive and the author of Philosophy of the United States and Secretary General of Professors World Peace Academy. He is a graduate of Claremont Graduate University, where he earned a doctorate in philosophy of religion in 1986.

He has been Senior Editor and Business Manager for the New World Encyclopedia since 2004, an Internet encyclopedia thousands of articles concerning the New Age Korean ecumenical Unification Movement.

== See also ==
- American philosophy
- List of American philosophers
