= Wilbur Marshall Urban =

American philosopher

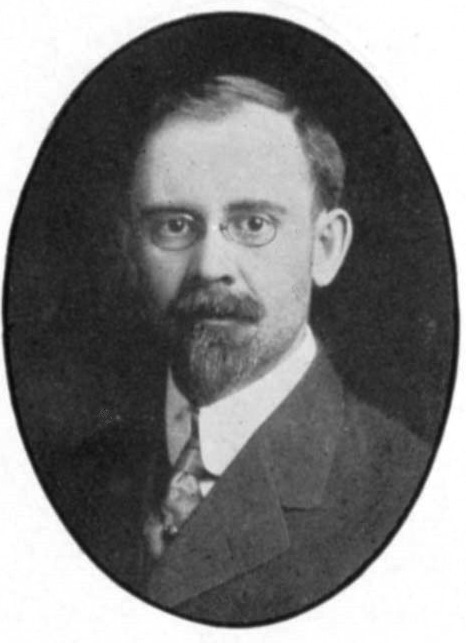
- Born: March 27, 1873; Mount Joy, Pennsylvania
- Died: October 15, 1952 (aged 79); New Haven, Connecticut
- Spouse: Elizabeth Newell Wakelin

Philosophical work
- Era: 20th-century philosophy
- Region: Western philosophy
- Institutions: Ursinus College; Trinity College (Connecticut); Dartmouth College; Yale University

Wilbur Marshall Urban (March 27, 1873–October 15, 1952) was an American philosopher of language, influenced by Ernst Cassirer. He wrote also on religion, axiology, ethics and idealism.

== Biography ==
Urban was born at on March 27, 1873 Mount Joy, Pennsylvania, to the Rev. Abraham Linwood Urban and Emma Louisa (Trexler) Urban.

== Philosophy ==
His Language and Reality, besides its exposition of Cassirer's ideas, has been described as the work “that first introduced Husserl’s phenomenology to the English speaking world”. It began with the words “Language is the last and deepest problem for the philosophic mind.”

He was Stone Professor of Philosophy at Dartmouth College, from 1920 to 1931, and President of the American Philosophical Association in 1925-6. He was then a professor at Yale University, succeeded in 1941 by Cassirer.

He was a critic of Alfred North Whitehead, and of Paul Tillich.

== In literary criticism ==
Cleanth Brooks, in The Well Wrought Urn (1947), gave extended attention to Urban's views on language and symbolism, as applied to poetry. Suzanne Langer, however, starting from a similar base in Cassirer's thought, had criticized what Urban had to say in detail on poetry, in Philosophy in a New Key (1942). These matters are discussed in Cleanth Brooks and William K. Wimsatt, Literary Criticism: A Short History (1957).

== Works ==
- The Problem of a "Logic of the Emotions" and Affective Memory (1901)
- Definition and Analysis of the Consciousness of Value (1907)
- Valuation: Its Nature and Laws, Being an Introduction to the General Theory of Value (1909)
- Ontological Problems of Value (1917)
- The Intelligible World: Metaphysics and Value (1929)
- The Philosophy of Language (1929)
- The Church and Modern Thought: The Cure of Modern Souls (1931)
- The Church and the Modern World: The New Erastianism (1935)
- Language and Reality: The Philosophy of Language and the Principles of Symbolism (1939)
- Fundamentals of Ethics: An Introduction to Moral Philosophy (1945)
- Beyond Realism and Idealism (1949)
- Humanity and Deity (1951)

== See also ==
- American philosophy
- List of American philosophers
