= George Sher =

American philosopher

George Sher is a moral philosopher and political philosopher who has taught at Rice University since 1991.

== Education and career ==
Sher earned his bachelor's degree at Brandeis University and his Ph.D. in Philosophy from Columbia University in 1972. He taught at the University of Vermont before moving to Rice.

== Philosophical work ==
His work has largely focused on liberalism, perfectionism, and issues in moral psychology. He is married to essayist and novelist Emily Fox Gordon.

== Bibliography ==
- Desert, Princeton University Press, 1987; paperback, 1989.
- Beyond Neutrality: Perfectionism and Politics, Cambridge University Press, 1997. Chinese edition (Hebei People's Publishing House) forthcoming.
- Approximate Justice: Studies in Non-Ideal Theory, Rowman and Littlefield, 1997.
- In Praise of Blame, Oxford University Press, 2006.
- Who Knew? Responsibility Without Awareness, Oxford University Press, 2009.
- Equality for Inegalitarians, Cambridge University Press, 2014.
- Me, You, Us, Oxford University Press, 2017.
- On Speaking One's Mind, Pacific Philosophical Quarterly, 2025.

== See also ==
- American philosophy
- List of American philosophers
