= William L. Reese =

William L. Reese (1921 - September 22, 2017) was a faculty member in the Department of Philosophy, State University of New York at Albany. He was born in Jefferson City, Missouri.

Reese gained his PhD from the University of Chicago in 1947. From 1967 to 1999 he was Professor of Philosophy at the State University of New York at Albany, and since 1999 has been professor emeritus and research professor in philosophy at the university.

== Works ==
- Dictionary of Philosophy and Religion: Eastern and Western Thought, New Jersey: Humanities Press Inc., 1980. ISBN 0-391-00688-6

"The Ascent from Below: An Introduction to Philosophical Inquiry," Boston: Houghton Mifflin Co., 1959. No ISBN "Philosophers Speak of God" with Charles Hartshorne, Humanity Books, 2nd Ed. 2000.

== See also ==
- American philosophy
- List of American philosophers
