= Mark Kuczewski =

American philosopher and bioethicist

Mark Kuczewski is an American philosopher and bioethicist. He has been a key contributor to the New Professionalism movement in medicine and medical education. In general, interest in professionalism has been widespread in medicine probably owing to the increasing regulatory and economic pressures on the practice of medicine. Many physicians have sought to identify the focal meaning of what it is to be a doctor in an effort to revitalize the profession. Kuczewski has been among a group that includes Richard and Sylvia Creuss, John Coulehan, and Matthew Wynia who see medical professionalism as including a commitment to social justice. That is, while professionalism entails such things as etiquette, communication skills, and basic medical ethics, professions are also expected to be leaders in educating the public and in advocating for the health of the public. Such leadership requires an understanding of the factors that lead some patient populations to be underserved and a commitment to bringing about social change to ameliorate these problems.

Kuczewski's interest in professionalism and social justice has led him to pursue ethical issues in the interactions between medicine and recent immigrant populations. He has brought his work in communitarian and casuistic methods to bear on questions such as medical repatriation, insurance for undocumented immigrants, and the eligibility of DREAMers (undocumented immigrants who were brought to the United States as children) to become practicing physicians. His scholarship and advocacy was the catalyst for the Loyola University Chicago Stritch School of Medicine becoming the first medical school in the United States to explicitly welcome applications from DREAMers with Deferred Action for Childhood Arrivals (DACA) status.

Under Kuczewski's direction, the Neiswanger Institute for Bioethics and Health Policy at Loyola University Chicago has become a leader in educational programming to promote the relationship between medical professionalism and social justice. The Neiswanger Institute has contributed elements to the Stritch curriculum that explore the relationship between the business of medicine and social justice. The institute also has online Master of Arts and doctoral programs that incorporating public health and leadership training in order to help health care professionals across the United States to promote service to the underserved.

Kuczewski was elected president of the American Society for Bioethics and Humanities and served a two-year term from 2009 to 2011. The ASBH is the major professional association in the United States for individuals engaged in bioethics and medical humanities. During his term, the society aggressively began moving toward a process called Quality Attestation that will attest to the credentials and expected competence of clinical ethics consultants.

== New Professionalism movement ==
The New Professionalism movement in medicine is a revival of communitarian bioethics that focus on the kinds of people and society we wish to be rather than on particular ethical questions of right and wrong. This focus on the relationship between the professional and the community can have important implications for medical education and professional development. While not eschewing case analysis and problem solving, the emphasis on the development of the person has created a renewed interest in narrative methods and reflection. Kuczewski has been an outspoken critic of efforts in medical education to focus on quantitative measures of professionalism education. He has argued that in an effort to make professionalism education “objective,” many medical educators are equating professionalism with trivial but easily measured behaviors.

== See also ==
- American philosophy
- List of American philosophers
