= Vernon Howard =

American writer

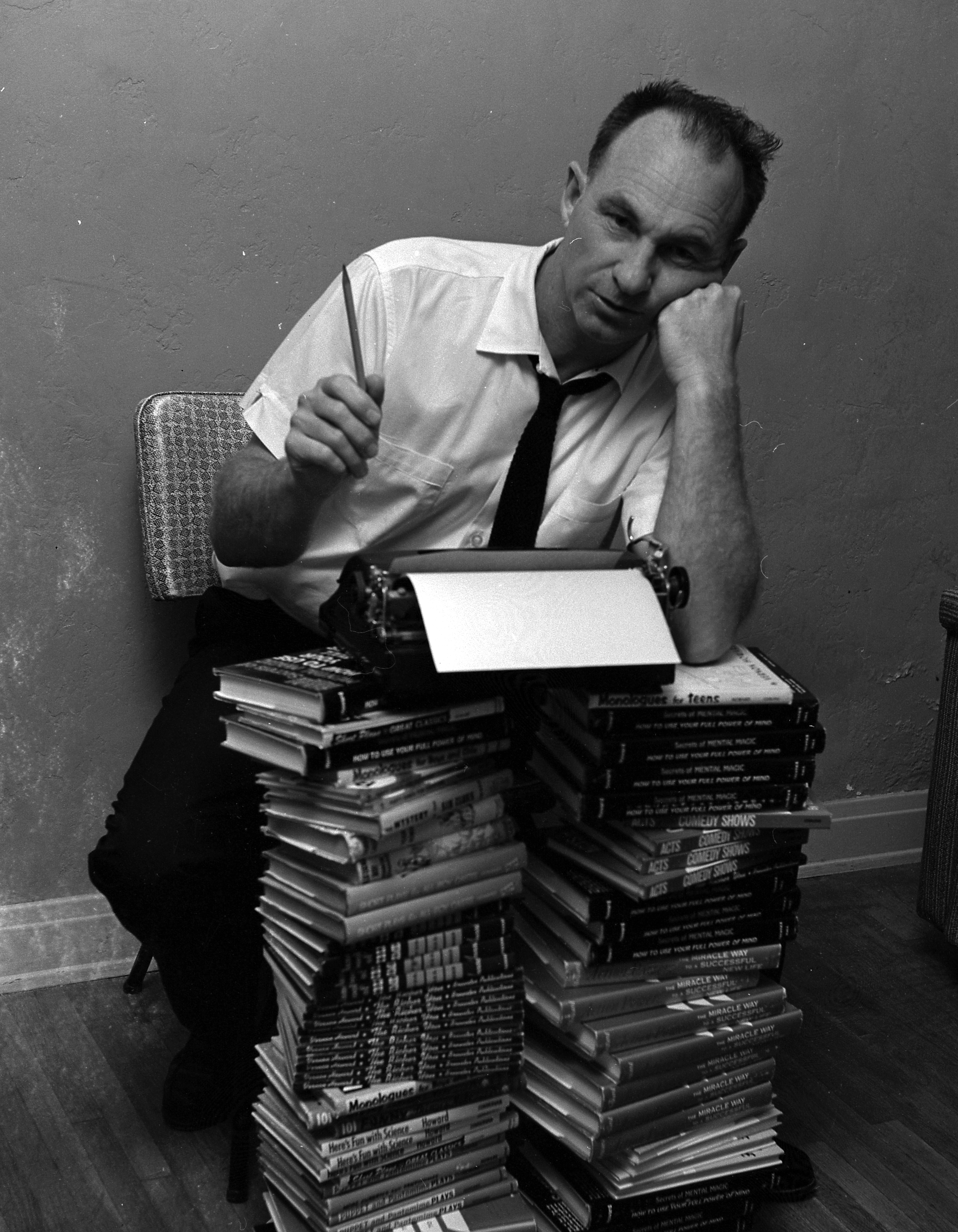
Howard with a stack of his own books, 1965

Vernon Linwood Howard (March 16, 1918 – August 23, 1992) was an American spiritual teacher, author, and philosopher.

== Career as writer and teacher ==
Howard was born near Haverhill, Massachusetts, and began his writing career in the 1940s as an author of humor and children's books. He began speaking on the principles of personal development in the late 1950s while living in southern California. In the 1960s, he began writing books that focused on spiritual and psychological growth. These writings emphasized the importance and practice of self-awareness. By the early 1970s, he had moved to Boulder City, Nevada, and had begun teaching spiritual development classes after being contacted by numerous individuals interested in his writings.

== Philosophy and teachings ==
Howard drew from what he perceived as being a "common thread" among several different philosophical and spiritual traditions for his insights and teachings. These included: Christian and Eastern mysticism, Gurdjieffian Fourth Way teachings, the Gospels of the New Testament, Jungian psychology, J. Krishnamurti and American Transcendentalism. He taught that there is a way out of suffering, and advocated self-honesty, persistence, the study and application of spiritual principles, and a sincere desire for inner change, according to Psycho-Pictography (page 34). He explained that a new and higher inner life is found through releasing the negative conditioned ego, which he described as the "false self". He asserted that this new life can only be found through awareness, and that the human ego is a barrier to this awareness. Thus, he taught that inner liberation is a ridding process, and that the false self is a fictitious collection of self-images or pictures about who we think we are (Psycho-Pictography, page 33).

== Legacy ==
In 1979, Howard founded the non-profit learning center New Life Foundation, where he continued to teach until his death in 1992. The foundation, now located in Pine, Arizona, continues Howard's legacy via personal classes held by some of the students who studied with Howard, as well as the marketing of his writings and recorded talks.

After Howard's death, several non-profit Foundations were established as a result of his many years of teaching. Mark L Butler, who studied with Howard from 1972 until 1992, established the Eagle Literary Foundation in Eagle, Idaho, in 1994. Guy Finley, who studied with him from 1978 until 1992, established the Life of Learning Foundation in Merlin, Oregon, in 1993. Both Butler and Finley are authors and teachers continuing with the spiritual principles learned from Howard's work. Tom Russell also studied twelve years with Vernon Howard and founded the nonprofit SuperWisdom Foundation to bring these principles to the internet through free weekly podcasts. An "Archive of Work by Vernon Howard" has also been made available for viewing online from the estate of one of Vernon Howard’s long time students and New Life Foundation Board member until the time of Vernon’s death, Concetta (Connie) M. Butler.

== Bibliography ==
Books

- Cosmic Command
- Psycho-Pictography: The New Way Use the Miracle Power of Your Mind
- The Mystic Path to Cosmic Power
- Esoteric Mind Power
- The Power of Your Supermind
- Pathways to Perfect Living
- Treasury of Positive Answers
- The Mystic Masters Speak
- There is a Way Out
- 1500 Ways to Escape the Human Jungle
- Inspire Yourself
- Esoteric Encyclopedia of Eternal Knowledge
- Solved:The Mystery of Life
- Your Power of Natural Knowing
- A Treasury of Trueness
- 700 Inspiring Guides to a New Life
- The Power of Esoterics
- Secrets of Higher Success
- Secrets of Mental Magic, How to Use Your Full Power of Mind
- Action power: The miracle way to a successful new life
- Your Magic Power To Persuade and Command People
- The Power of Psycho-Pictography: How to Change and Enrich Your Life with the Aid of Creative Visualisation (ISBN 0 85454 026 1, Vernon Howard, 1973)

Booklets

- Be Safe in a Dangerous World
- Conquer Anxiety & Frustration
- Conquer Harmful Anger 100 Ways
- Esoteric Path to a New Life
- Expose Human Sharks 100 Ways
- Freedom From a Life of Hell
- Freedom from Harmful Voices
- How To Handle Difficult People
- Live Above This Crazy World
- Mystery Stories for Winning Happiness
- Practical Exercises for Inner Harmony
- Sex and Sweethearts
- Women — 50 Ways to See Thru Men
- Your Power to Say NO
- 50 Ways to Escape Cruel People
- 50 Ways to Get Help from God
- 50 Ways to See Thru People

== See also ==
- American philosophy
- List of American philosophers
- Simple living

== Notes ==
- García Muñoz, Ernest.(2012) Reedición: 2024. Conciencia y felicidad. Una introducción a la mística, desde el pragmatismo de Vernon Howard. ASIN: B008RMKP12 https://www.amazon.com/dp/B0CYHM9C8F?ref_=pe_93986420_774987470
- Contemporary Authors Vol. 108, p. 230. Thomson-Gale, 2003. ISBN 0-8103-1908-X
