= Frederick Rauscher =

Frederick Rauscher (born 26 November 1961) is a philosophy professor and well known Kant scholar currently teaching at Michigan State University. Rauscher earned his Ph.D. in philosophy at the University of Pennsylvania in 1993. Previously, he taught at Eastern Illinois University and the University of Pennsylvania. Rauscher currently teaches courses on Kant, early modern philosophy, ethical theory, and German Idealism. Students have noted that Rauscher's voice bears an uncanny resemblance to that of Jerry Seinfeld.

== Contributions to philosophy ==
Rauscher's work primarily focuses on Kant, early modern philosophy, German Idealism, ethical theory, Nineteenth-Century philosophy, social and political philosophy, and philosophy of law. He was the Associate Chair and Director of the Philosophy Graduate Program at Michigan State University in 2007-8 and is the creator and manager of a website for Brazil – U.S. interaction on Kant studies.

== Professional publications ==
Rauscher has published numerous peer-reviewed articles in journals such as Cadernos de Filosofia Alemã, Ethic@, The Kantian Review, History of Philosophy Quarterly, The Journal of the History of Philosophy, The British Journal for the History of Philosophy, and Biology and Philosophy. His books include Immanuel Kant, Notes and Fragments and Evolutionary Psychology: Alternative Approaches.

== Awards and distinctions ==
In addition to being named Associate Chair and Director of the Philosophy Graduate Program at Michigan State University, Rauscher received the Michigan State University Fintz Teaching Excellence Award in Arts and Humanities in 2003 and was also granted a National Endowment for the Humanities Collaborative Research Grant in 2005–06. He was also a Deutscher Akademischer Austauschdienst (DAAD) Scholar at Institut für Philosophie and the Marburg Kant Archives and is a member of Phi Beta Kappa.

== Selected works ==
- Immanuel Kant, Notes and Fragments, edited by Paul Guyer, translated by Curtis Bowman, Paul Guyer, and Frederick Rauscher. (New York: Cambridge, 2005) in series The Cambridge Edition of the Works of Immanuel Kant. Primary responsibility for translation of selections from Kant's Nachlaß on moral philosophy.
- Evolutionary Psychology: Alternative Approaches, Steven Scher and Frederick Rauscher, eds. (New York: Kluwer Press, 2003).
- “Minando ouro: utilizando o Nachlaß e as preleções de Kant como fonte para sua filosofia política” ["Mining for Gold: Using Kant’s Nachlaß and Lectures as a Source for Political Philosophy”], trans. Cauê Cardoso Polla, Cadernos de Filosofia Alemã [Journal of German Philosophy] XIV, jul-dec 2009, 11–30
- “Razão prática pura como uma faculdade natural” [“Pure Practical Reason as a Natural Faculty”] trans. Milene Consenso Tonetto, Ethic@ 5 (2006) pp 173–192

== See also ==
- American Philosophy
- American Philosophers
- German Idealism
