= John Kaag =

American philosopher

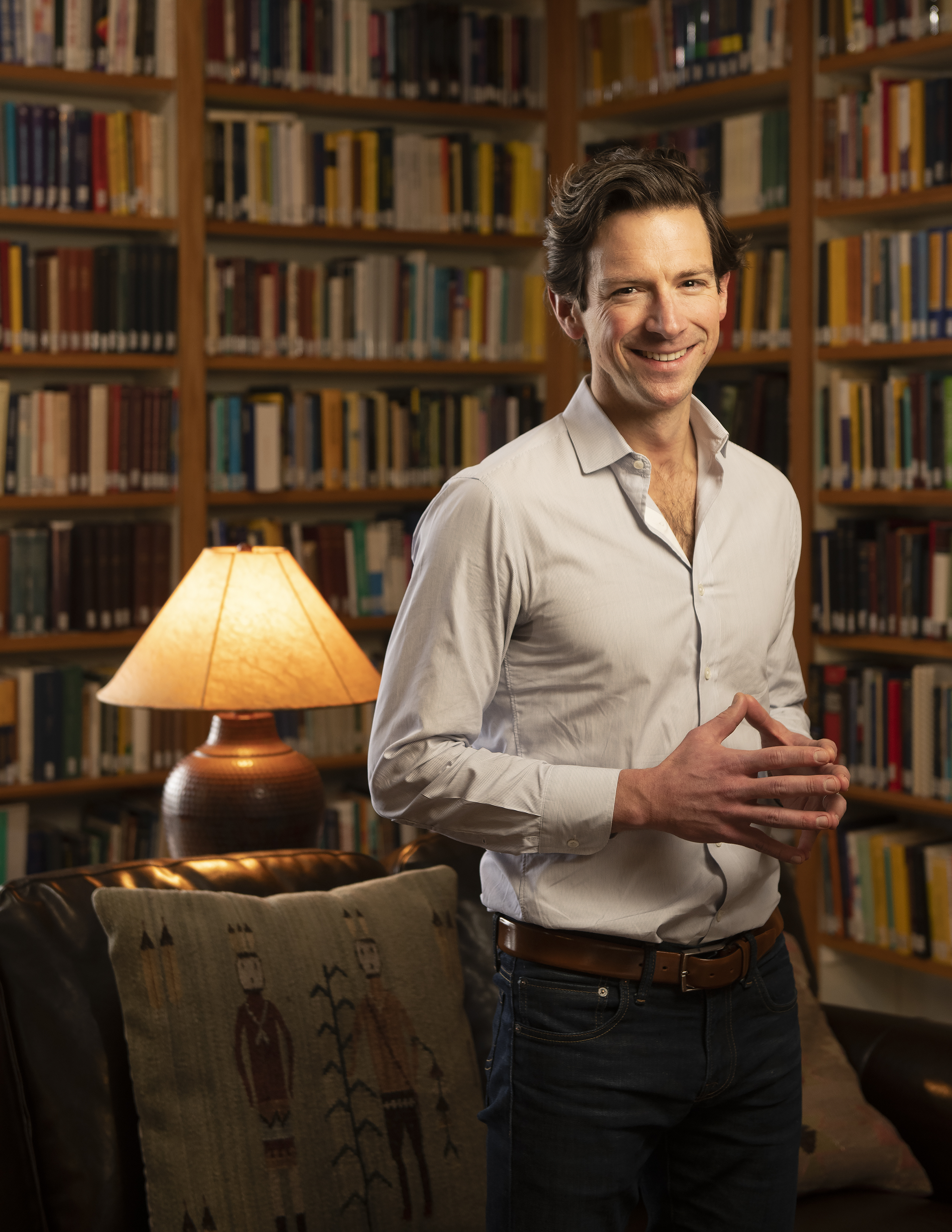
- Born: 27 September 1979 (age 47); Reading, Pennsylvania, US

Education
- Education: University of Oregon

John Kaag (born 1979) is an American philosopher and chair and professor of philosophy at the University of Massachusetts Lowell. Kaag specializes in American philosophy. His writing has been published in The Paris Review, The New York Times, and Harper's Magazine.

== Early life and education ==
Kaag was born to Jan and Rebecca Kaag.

Kaag received his master's degree in Philosophy in 2003 from Pennsylvania State University and his PhD in philosophy in 2007 from the University of Oregon. He did his post-doctoral study at the American Academy of Arts and Sciences and Harvard University.

== Career ==
John Kaag is professor and Chair of Philosophy at the University of Massachusetts, Lowell. Kaag was a Miller Scholar at the Santa Fe Institute from 2019 to 2021, and is now an External Professor at the Santa Fe Institute.

In February 2023, Kaag delivered the lecture "William James and the Sick Soul" for Harvard Divinity School's William James Lectures on Religious Experience series.

== Awards ==
Kaag's book American Philosophy: A Love Story won the John Dewey Prize from the Society for U.S. Intellectual History.

Hiking with Nietzsche was named the Best Book of 2018 by NPR and a New York Times Editors' Choice.

== Bibliography ==
- Idealism, Pragmatism, and Feminism: The Philosophy of Ella Lyman Cabot (2011). Lanham: Rowman & Littlefield. ISBN 978-0-7391-6781-6.
- Thinking Through the Imagination: Aesthetics in Human Cognition (2014). New York: Fordham University Press. ISBN 978-0-8232-5493-4.
- American Philosophy: A Love Story (2016). New York: Farrar, Straus and Giroux. ISBN 978-0-3741-5448-6.
- Hiking with Nietzsche: On Becoming Who You Are (2018). New York: Farrar, Straus and Giroux. ISBN 978-0-3741-7001-1.
- Sick Souls, Healthy Minds: How William James Can Save Your Life (2020). Princeton: Princeton University Press. ISBN 978-0-6911-9216-1.
- Be Not Afraid of Life: In the Words of William James (2023). Princeton: Princeton University Press. ISBN 978-0-6912-4015-2.
- Henry at Work: Thoreau on Making a Living (2023). Princeton: Princeton University Press. ISBN 978-0-6912-4469-3.
- American Bloods: The Untamed Dynasty That Shaped a Nation (2024). New York: Farrar, Straus and Giroux. ISBN 978-0-3741-0391-0.
- Thinking through Writing: A Guide to Becoming a Better Writer and Thinker (2024). Princeton: Princeton University Press. ISBN 978-0-6912-4959-9.

== See also ==
- American philosophy
- List of American philosophers
