= Theodore Schick =

American philosopher

Theodore Schick is an American author in the field of philosophy.

His articles have appeared in numerous publications and include topics such as functionalism and its effect on immortality, the logic behind the criteria of adequacy, and applying a scientific approach to the paranormal. In 1994, Schick and Lewis Vaughn published How to Think About Weird Things: Critical Thinking for a New Age, which is designed to teach the reader how to think critically about extraordinary claims. Schick and Vaughn say the adequacy of scientific hypotheses depends on their testability, fruitfulness, scope, simplicity, and conservatism.

== Biography ==
He received a B.A. from Harvard University and a Ph.D. in philosophy from Brown University. He was a long-time professor of philosophy at Muhlenberg College and the director of the Muhlenberg Scholars program. His upper-level courses included the philosophy of mind, biomedical ethics, and the philosophy of science. He played lead guitar in the band Doctors of Rock at Muhlenberg College. He retired in 2021 after 41 years as a Professor of Philosophy.

== Bibliography ==
- with Lewis Vaughn: Doing Philosophy: An Introduction Through Thought Experiments, ISBN 0-7674-2050-0.
- Schick, Theodore; Vaughn, Lewis (January 28, 2013). How to Think About Weird Things: Critical Thinking for a New Age (Seventh ed.). McGraw-Hill Education. ISBN 978-0-07-803836-5.

== See also ==
- American philosophy
- List of American philosophers
