= William S. Sahakian =

William S. Sahakian (Armenian: Ուիլյամ Սահակյան) (January 1, 1922 – April 6, 1986) was an Armenian-American philosopher. Receiving his BS at Northeastern University with a major in psychology and sociology in 1944, Sahakian later completed his graduate studies in philosophy at Harvard University and at Boston University. In 1951, Sahakian received his Ph.D. degree from Boston University. Sahakian's dissertation was entitled, The emotive ethic in contemporary British and American philosophy. Sahakian also received a Master of Divinity degree at Boston University in 1947.

Besides teaching, Sahakian was the author of numerous books on various topics in philosophy and psychology, including Outline-history of philosophy (1968), Systems of ethics and value theory (1963), Philosophies of religion (1965), Psychology of personality; readings in theory (1965), History of psychology; a source book in systematic psychology (1968), Psychotherapy and counseling; studies in technique (1969), Psychology of learning; systems, models, and theories (1970), Psychopathology today; experimentation, theory and research (1970), Social psychology: experimentation, theory, research (1972), and Systematic social psychology (1974),

With his wife, Mabel Lewis Sahakian (1921–1982), William Sahakian wrote and published several books, including Ideas of the great philosophers (1966), Realms of philosophy (1965)), Rousseau as educator (1974), John Locke (1975), and Plato (1977).

Sahakian's books have been translated in various languages.

From 1949 until 1974, Sahakian served as the Chairman of Suffolk University's philosophy department. He was scheduled to begin serving again as the department head in July 1986, but, after suffering a massive heart attack, Sahakian died on 6 April 1986.

In addition to his work in psychology and philosophy, Sahakian served as a pastor in Massachusetts. He served in the 1980s as pastor at Riverdale Congregational Church in Dedham, Massachusetts and served as pastor in churches in Chelsea and Bedford before 1955.

== See also ==
- American philosophy
- List of Armenian philosophers
- List of American philosophers
- List of philosophers
