= Jean Elizabeth Hampton =

American philosopher

Jean Elizabeth Hampton (June 1, 1954 – April 2, 1996) was an American political philosopher, author of Hobbes and the Social Contract Tradition, Political Philosophy, The Authority of Reason, The Intrinsic Worth of Persons and, with Jeffrie G Murphy, Forgiveness and Mercy.

== Work ==
She subscribed to the "moral education" theory of punishment, where the goal is to first educate the criminal and then secondly educate society about the morally wrong action that has been done by the criminal. This theory does not condone 'pain' inflicted punishment, nor does it believe that incarceration is always the answer. The theory states that all criminals, even if they have wronged society, are still due the autonomous rights guaranteed them by the state, and it is the state's duty to uphold the moral education of the criminal the best way that it can.

She later supported the expressive theory of retribution (see her article "An Expressive Theory of Retribution" from Retributivism and Its Critics, ed. Wesley Cragg. Franz Steiner, 1992).

Hampton was on sabbatical in Paris with her husband, Richard Healey, a University of Arizona philosophy professor, when she suffered a cerebral hemorrhage March 29, 1996. She died three days later as a result of complications from that hemorrhage. She was 41.

== Selected bibliography ==
=== Books ===
- Hampton, Jean (1986). Hobbes and the Social Contract Tradition. Cambridge New York: Cambridge University Press. ISBN 9780521261845.
- Hampton, Jean; Copp, David; Roemer, John E. (1993). The Idea of Democracy. Cambridge New York: Cambridge University Press. ISBN 9780521483261.
- Hampton, Jean (1997). Political Philosophy. Boulder, Colorado: Westview Press. ISBN 9780521556149.
- Hampton, Jean (1998). The Authority of Reason. Cambridge New York: Cambridge University Press. ISBN 9780813308586.
- Hampton, Jean (2007). Daniel Farnham (ed.). The Intrinsic Worth of Persons: Contractarianism in Moral and Political Philosophy. Cambridge; New York: Cambridge University Press. ISBN 9780521673259.

=== Book chapters ===
- Hampton, Jean (1996), "The case for feminism", in Leahy, Michael; Cohn-Sherbok, Dan (eds.), The liberation debate: rights at issue, Routledge, pp. 3–24, ISBN 9780415116947.
- Hampton, Jean (2005), "Feminist contractarianism", in Cudd, Ann E.; Andreasen, Robin O. (eds.), Feminist theory: a philosophical anthology, Oxford, UK Malden, Massachusetts: Blackwell Publishing, pp. 280–301, ISBN 9781405116619.

== See also ==
- American philosophy
- List of American philosophers
