= Elmer Sprague =

American philosopher (1924–2019)

Elmer Sprague (1924 – April 19, 2019) was a professor at Brooklyn College of the City University of New York, where he taught philosophy for 44 years. He obtained a B.A. from the University of Nebraska, and a B.A. and D.Phil. from Oxford. He was a Rhodes Scholar at Oxford (1948–51), and was the Paul Robert and Jean Shuman Hanna Professor of Philosophy at Hamline University (1987).

Growing up in Lincoln, Nebraska, "where Lee Lawrie's sculptures on the state capitol dominate the city" led to Sprague's interest in "sculpture watching," which in turn led him to publishing Brooklyn Public Monuments: Sculpture for Civic Memory and Urban Pride.

His previous publications include articles on Ryle and Hume, and the books, Metaphysical Thinking and What is Philosophy published by New York Oxford Press in 1961. His specialties are the philosophy of mind, metaphysics and the philosophy of language. His book Persons and their Minds, published in 1999, is a Wittgensteinian-Ryleian critique of modern philosophy of mind. He viewed it as a mistake to treat mind and body as two abstract categories to be somehow assembled into a third abstract category purportedly encompassing both. Rather he thought the features that have been attributed separately to mind and to body ought to be returned to their lived context in "the person." His finely contextual approach is exemplified in his books: What Is Philosophy? (1961), Metaphysical Thinking (1978), and Persons and Their Minds (1999). He also had a longstanding interest in the history of British philosophy and published widely in this area. Early in Elmer's career at Brooklyn College he and his colleague Paul Taylor were asked by the Philosophy Department to prepare an anthology for use in the department's introductory course. The result was the very successful Knowledge and Value that influenced many other anthologies of its type.

Like his written work, Elmer's teaching was characterized by its clarity. He was an extremely influential teacher and the recipient of a college-wide Excellence in Teaching Award. A number of his students went on to academic careers in philosophy. He also inspired scores of other students, many of whom would visit the Philosophy Department at Brooklyn College periodically to meet and speak with him. Elmer once described himself as a person who couldn't be told things but always had to learn them for himself. This revealing comment might lead those who did not know Elmer to believe that he was a solitary inquirer or considered this to be the paradigm of learning and knowledge. This was not at all the case. In fact, he was a strong proponent of the importance of collaborative or collective inquiry. For years he participated in the Brooklyn Wittgenstein Club, a study group of various (and ever changing) members of the department. These sessions, including comments by the other participants in the group, often served as a catalyst for Elmer to develop new insights about material with which he was already extremely familiar. In the 1980s Brooklyn College developed a core curriculum, a set of general education requirements for undergraduates that included an introductory course in philosophy. Elmer was an enthusiastic supporter of the new curriculum and began to teach his students using the group method. He divided the students into groups, presented them with questions about a given reading, and asked them to arrive at answers collectively.

Elmer was also an outstanding photographer. For example, anyone who was fortunate enough to view the pictures he took of many of the natural sights of Iceland during a philosophy conference in 1984 would be struck by their haunting beauty. He and Gretchen moved to a home in the Hudson Valley a few years before his retirement, but he retained an abiding interest in New York City, especially the borough of Brooklyn. After his retirement he became a volunteer archivist in the New York City Parks Department and helped to develop a database for the city's public monuments. His last book, Brooklyn Public Monuments: Sculpture for Civic Memory and Urban Pride, was published in 2008. It combined his skill as a photographer with his knowledge of the borough in which for so many years he had lived, taught, and raised his children. Elmer's major philosophical writings were in the areas of metaphysics and the philosophy of mind as well as in analyzing the distinctive nature of philosophy, itself. He viewed it as a mistake to treat mind and body as two abstract categories to be somehow assembled into a third abstract category purportedly encompassing both. Rather he thought the features that have been attributed separately to mind and to body ought to be returned to their lived context in "the person." His finely contextual approach is exemplified in his books: What Is Philosophy? (1961), Metaphysical Thinking (1978), and Persons and Their Minds (1999). He also had a longstanding interest in the history of British philosophy and published widely in this area. Early in Elmer's career at Brooklyn College he and his colleague Paul Taylor were asked by the Philosophy Department to prepare an anthology for use in the department's introductory course. The result was the very successful Knowledge and Value that influenced many other anthologies of its type and provided an ongoing funding source for department activities and needs.

== See also ==
- American philosophy
- List of American philosophers
