= Leonard M. Fleck =

Leonard Michael Fleck (born 1944) is an American philosophy professor and medical ethicist. He earned his Ph.D. from St. Louis University in 1975 and taught courses at St. Mary's College (Indiana) before going on to teach and at Michigan State University where he currently holds a dual appointment with the philosophy department and the Center for Ethics and Humanities in the Life Sciences. Fleck was also a member of Hillary Clinton's Task Force on Health Reform in 1993 and the staff ethicist for the Michigan governor's task force on access to health care in 1989-1990.

== Contributions to Philosophy ==
Fleck's work primarily focuses on medical ethics, priority-setting or rationing, health care policy, and decision making in reproduction. He also explores the role of democratic deliberation when controversial issues of ethics are addressed and the formation of public policy surrounding emerging genetic technologies. In addition to the honors above, Fleck is also a member of the Hastings Center and served for three years as chair of the Philosophy and Medicine Committee of the American Philosophical Association.

== Professional Publications ==
During his career, Fleck has written over one hundred professional publications dealing with a broad range of topics in health care ethics and especially on issues related to health care justice and health care policy. Fleck published a number of articles on ethical issues focused on emerging genetic technologies while he acted as co-principal investigator for two three-year NIH ELSI grants. He completed a book for Oxford University Press called "Just Caring: The Moral and Practical Challenges of Health Reform and Health Care Rationing" which explores the role of democratic deliberation when problems of health care justice are addressed. As a side note, Fleck also published a scholarly article on Ursula K. Le Guin's book The Dispossessed.

== Awards and Distinctions ==
In addition to being appointed a member of Hillary Rodham Clinton's Task Force on Health Reform in 1993 and the staff ethicist for the Michigan governor's task force on access to health care, Fleck was also awarded the University Distinguished Faculty Award from Michigan State University in 2003, is an elected fellow of the Hastings Center, and was awarded numerous fellowships and grants.

== Selected works ==
- Personalized medicine's ragged edge. Hastings Cent Rep. 2010;40(5):16-18.
- Just Caring: Health Care Rationing and Democratic Deliberation. Oxford: Oxford University Press; 2009.
- Regulating reproductive technologies: Can we trust "democratic deliberation"? Hastings Cent Rep. 2007;37(4):22-5.
- Fleck LM, Petersmark K. Ethical Considerations Related to Obesity Intervention. In: Fitzgerald HE, Davies HD, eds. Obesity in Childhood and Adolescence: Understanding Development and Prevention. 2nd ed. Westport, CT: Greenwood Press; 2007:271-303.
- The costs of caring: Who pays? Who profits? Who panders? Hastings Cent Rep. 2006;36(3):13-7.

== See also ==
- American Philosophy
- American Philosophers
- Medical Ethics
