= Donna Dickenson =

American philosopher and medical ethicist

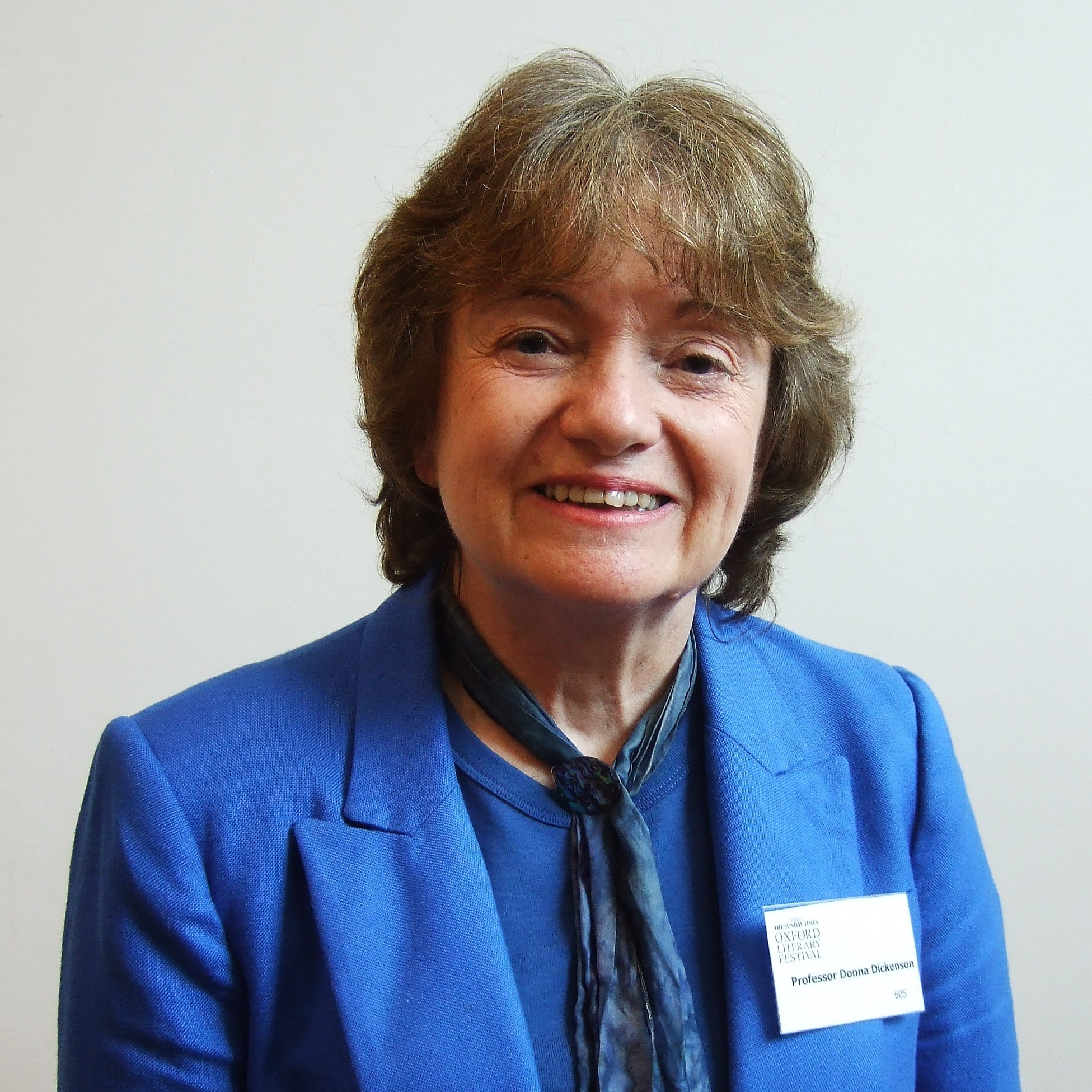
- Donna Dickenson at the 2012 Oxford Literary Festival
- Born: 1946 (age 79–80); New England, US
- Education: Wellesley College, London School of Economics
- Occupation: Philosopher
- Spouse: Christopher Britton
- Awards: International Spinoza Lens prize, 2006

Donna L. Dickenson (born 1946) is an American philosopher who specializes in medical ethics. She is Emeritus Professor of Medical Ethics and Humanities at the University of London, fellow of the Ethox and HeLEX Centres at the University of Oxford, and visiting fellow at the Centre for Ethics in Medicine, University of Bristol.

She has written over 20 books on the subject, including Bioethics: All That Matters (a short introduction) (2012); Me Medicine vs. We Medicine: Reclaiming Biotechnology for the Common Good (2013), Moral Luck in Medical Ethics and Practical Politics (1991), Risk and Luck in Medical Ethics (2003), Property in the Body: Feminist Perspectives (2007), and Body Shopping: Converting Body Parts to Profit (2009). She is also the co-author of The Cambridge Medical Ethics Workbook (2001), and second edition of The Cambridge Medical Ethics Workbook (2010).

== Education ==
Dickenson is an alumna of Choate Rosemary Hall in Connecticut and Wellesley College in Massachusetts, where her B.A. was in political science. She obtained an M.Sc. in international relations from the London School of Economics. She returned to the U.S. to work as a research assistant at Yale University, and spent a year working for the Vera Institute of Justice in New York City. In 1974, she took up a post at the Open University in the UK, and later obtained her doctorate in philosophy with a study on moral luck in ethics and politics. She worked as a lecturer at the Open University for 22 years; during that time she developed a nationwide course on death and dying, funded by the Department of Health to disseminate new advances in palliative care and ethical issues to a wider public.

== Career ==
In 1997, she moved to Imperial College, London as Leverhulme Reader in Medical Ethics and Law, and in 2001 to the University of Birmingham as John Ferguson Professor of Global Ethics. In 2005, she became Professor of Medical Ethics and Humanities at Birkbeck College, London, where she directed the Birkbeck Institute for the Humanities. She also directed four international research projects for the European Commission, including the Network for European Women's Rights (2004-2006), funded by the Vth Framework Programme of European Commission to investigate contrasting European approaches to ethical and legal issues in reproductive ethics, trafficking, women's political participation and social entitlements (Heather Widdows et al. (eds), Women's Reproductive Rights [Basingstoke: Palgrave Macmillan, 2006]).

She has given expert evidence to bodies including the House of Commons Science and Technology Committee and the European Association of National Bioethics Committees, and has served on many national ethics governance bodies, such as the Ethics Committee of the UK Royal College of Obstetricians and Gynaecologists (2003- 2009).

In 2006, she became the first woman to receive the International Spinoza Lens prize, a bi-annual prize in ethics awarded in the Netherlands.

== See also ==
- American philosophy
- List of American philosophers
