= Janet McCracken =

Janet McCracken is the chair of Classical studies and professor of philosophy at Lake Forest College. She specializes in aesthetics.

== Biography ==
McCracken earned a Bachelor of Arts from Vassar College and a Master of Arts and PhD from University of Texas at Austin. She currently serves as the director of the Ethics Center at Lake Forest College and was the Krebs Provost and Dean of the Faculty from 2005 to 2011 and the associate dean of the faculty from 2000 to 2002.

Her husband Chad McCracken also teaches philosophy at Lake Forest College.

== Selected publications ==
=== Books ===
- Taste and the Household: The "Domestic Aesthetic" and Moral Reasoning. author (State University of New York Press, October 2001)
- Thinking About Gender: A Historical Anthology. editor and commentary. (Harcourt-Brace College Publishers, 1997)

=== Chapters in anthologies ===
- "Perry Mason as Greek Tragedy: the Eternal Allure of Aristotle." Perry Mason and Philosophy. ed. by Robert Arp. Open Court, forthcoming 2018.
- "Grief and the Memnonics of Place: A Thank You Note," in Passion, Death, and Spirituality: The Philosophy of Robert C. Solomon (Sophia Studies in Cross-cultural Philosophy of Traditions and Cultures). Edited by Kathleen Higgins and David Sherman. Cham, Switzerland: Springer, 2012
- The Aesthetics of Playtime Recycling," in The Aesthetics of Human Environments. Edited by Arnold Berleant and Allen Carlson. Peterborough, Ontario: Broadview Press, 2007. Based on a presentation, "Recycling Aesthetics," (American Society for Aesthetics Fall 2002 Conference, October 31, 2002.)

=== Journal articles ===
- "The Non-Western of the New West." Film & History, vol. 44, no. 2 (Fall 2014): 82–87.
- "Dogs and Birds in Plato." Philosophy and Literature, vol. 38, no. 2 (October 2014): 446–61.
- "Falsely, Sanely, Shallowly: Reflections on the Special Character of Grief." International Journal of Applied Philosophy, vol. 19, no. 1 (2005): 139–56.

== See also ==
- American philosophy
- List of American philosophers
