= David Alan Johnson =

Australian-American mathematician

- Born: 1952 (age 73–74)

Academic background
- Education: University of Nebraska–Lincoln (BA, 1976); Princeton University (PhD, 1989)

Academic work
- Discipline: Philosophy
- Sub-discipline: Epistemology, philosophical logic
- Institutions: University of Nebraska–Lincoln; Princeton University; Ohio State University; University of Connecticut; Wesleyan University; College of William & Mary; Syracuse University; UCLA; Yeshiva University
- Notable works: Hume, Holism, and Miracles (1999); Truth Without Paradox (2004)
- Website: www.yu.edu/faculty/pages/johnson-david

David Alan Johnson (born 1952) is Associate Professor of Philosophy and chair of the Department of Philosophy at Yeshiva University and has previously taught at UCLA, Syracuse University, Ohio State University, University of Connecticut, Wesleyan University, and College of William & Mary.

== Work ==
He was raised in Lincoln, Nebraska, and earned his BA from the University of Nebraska–Lincoln while studying under Robert Audi. He earned his PhD from Princeton University while studying under Gilbert Harman, and was influenced by Saul Kripke's work. His areas of concentration are Analytic philosophy, Philosophical logic, Epistemology, and Philosophy of Religion, and he is conservative and theist.

In his first book, Hume, Holism, and Miracles, Johnson purports to have refuted David Hume's popular argument for the irrationality of belief in testimony of miracles (as can be found in his essay entitled "Of Miracles") as well as several reconstructions of Hume's argument, such as those of philosophers Jordan Howard Sobel, John Stuart Mill, J. L. Mackie, and Antony Flew. Subsequently, Robert Fogelin (of Dartmouth College) responded to Johnson's critique (among others') of Hume in his book A Defense of Hume on Miracles, claiming that they had misunderstood Hume's argument..

Johnson's second book, Truth Without Paradox, purports to resolve some traditional problems in Metaphysics, including the Liar paradox and the Lottery paradox. In its fifth and final chapter, Johnson presents an ontological argument and a historical argument for the existence of God and the validity of the Bible.

== Books ==
- Hume, Holism, and Miracles (Cornell University Press, 1999)
- Truth Without Paradox (Rowman & Littlefield Publishers, 2004)

== See also ==
- American philosophy
- List of American philosophers
