= Tad Schmaltz =

American philosopher (born 1960)

Tad M. Schmaltz (born 1960) is a professor of philosophy at the University of Michigan, Ann Arbor. Prior to that, he was a professor of philosophy at Duke University, where he began his teaching career in 1989. He graduated magna cum laude with a BA in philosophy from Kalamazoo College in 1983, received his doctorate in 1988 from the University of Notre Dame. He is the author of Malebranche's Theory of the Soul (Oxford University Press, 1996) and Radical Cartesianism (Cambridge University Press, 2002). He is editor of the Journal of the History of Philosophy.

Schmaltz spent his early childhood in Ft. Wayne, Indiana, before moving to Ann Arbor, Michigan, where he attended St. Paul Lutheran School on Earhart Road.

== See also ==
- American philosophy
- List of American philosophers
