= Marcus Berquist =

American philosopher and academic (1934 – November 2, 2010)

Marcus Berquist (1934 – November 2, 2010) was an American philosopher and academic. He was one of the founders of Thomas Aquinas College, and an authority on the writings of Thomas Aquinas.

He received his bachelor's degree in philosophy from the College of St. Thomas in St. Paul, Minn. and his licentiate degree in philosophy from Université Laval in Quebec. He nearly completed his Ph.D. from Université Laval with Charles De Koninck as his mentor but did not due to De Koninck's death.

He taught at Thomas Aquinas College for over thirty-one years.

He is a proponent of angels as described in the Gospels and explains that, "It is only with difficulty and many mistakes that we can come to knowledge of invisible beings, beings that are more real and more alive than bodies."

== See also ==
- American philosophy
- List of American philosophers
