= David Rynin =

American philosopher

David Rynin (October 15, 1905 – February 24, 2000) was an American philosopher. He is known mostly as an exponent of logical positivism. He served as president of the Pacific division of the American Philosophical Association in the years 1956–7. Until his death, he was professor emeritus at the University of California, Berkeley.

== See also ==
- American philosophy
- List of American philosophers
