= Bruce Wilshire =

American philosopher

Bruce W. Wilshire (February 8, 1932 – January 1, 2013) was an American philosopher who taught in the philosophy department at Rutgers University, from which he retired as Professor Emeritus in 2009. Beginning as a specialist in William James, he became known for his work on philosophy and theater, his criticisms of analytic philosophy, and his interest in Native American philosophy.

== Biography ==
Wilshire's father, Gilbert Wilshire, piqued his interest in science and astronomy at an early age, so that he began reflecting on the "big questions" (creation, the nature of the universe, and related issues). His mother June was very religious and devout. As a teenager in high school he met E. J. Carnell, the philosophical theologian who was president of Fuller Theological Seminary. The young student was deeply impressed by the man, his thoughts, and found him to be inspirational. He started his college career as a freshman at Pasadena City College, where he was a navigator. In his junior year he moved on to Wheaton College. Among works influential on his early formation were Living Issues in Philosophy by Harold Titus, Lord Jim by Joseph Conrad, and World Hypotheses by Stephen Pepper, which was a source for key metaphors that guided much of his later thinking.

Wilshire received his BA from the University of Southern California (USC) and his MA and PhD from New York University (NYU). While attending USC, he drove a taxicab to make ends meet, experiencing encounters with people he felt gave him insight into the human condition. Early in his graduate school career, he was drafted to serve in the Korean War. Shortly after being drafted he fell ill with pneumonia and then scarlet fever, which led to his being stationed around the United States: first at Fort Ord in Monterey, California, then at Fort Jackson in Columbia, South Carolina, and finally in Atlanta, Georgia, where he gave crude psychology tests to draftees. While in Atlanta, Wilshire read Sydney Hook's dissertation The Metaphysics of Pragmatism. He also enjoyed acting in local theater productions (his was a dramatic physical presence at 6' 4" tall). Some of his influential friends of the time were Harold Citron and Frank Wittow, founder of an Atlanta theater. His interest in acting and theater eventually led to the publication of one of his most widely influential books in 1982: Role-Playing and Identity: The Limits of Theatre as Metaphor, a meditation on the nature of performance.

After being honorably discharged, he traveled to New York City to join the American Theatre Wing to study theater, funded by the GI Bill, which paid $110 a month. During that time he took a course in social philosophy at NYU with the Marxist Sydney Hook. The 50-page paper he wrote for the course, “The Problem of Work,” was a defining event that convinced Wilshire he would be a philosopher. Another mentor at NYU was William Barrett, who was well known for debating prominent scientists of the time. While a graduate student he taught in the NYC public schools and took education classes. He completed his master's degree within two years, writing his thesis on “Kierkegaard’s Theory of Truth,” then proceeded to complete his PhD with a 1966 dissertation: “William James and Phenomenology: Philosophical Issues in William James’ Principles of Psychology.” In 1967 he moved to the south campus of Purdue University as a tenure-track assistant professor of philosophy. By 1969 he moved to Rutgers University in New Brunswick, New Jersey, with a tenured position, where he remained the rest of his professional career.

His first book, William James and Phenomenology (1968), brought together continental thought and William James’s genius for lively description. Wilshire went on to become an eminent James scholar, editing William James: The Essential Writings (1971). He also explored the hitherto unsuspected link between American philosophy and Native American thought, arguing in The Primal Roots of American Philosophy for deep affinities between Ralph Waldo Emerson, William James, and Charles Sanders Peirce with Black Elk. A philosophical pluralist, Wilshire became the leader of the American Philosophical Association’s Committee on Pluralism in the 1970s and 1980s. The Rutgers philosophy department turned in an increasingly analytic direction over the years he taught there. Ironically, he wrote one of the most trenchant critiques of analytical philosophy, Fashionable Nihilism (2002), while teaching in a department that was rated the number one analytic department in the United States by the end of his career. Every August for many years he hiked in the high Sierra Nevada mountains. Wilshire authored seven books, among them Wild Hunger (1999), a theory of the roots of addictive behavior as traceable to the lack of experiencing open landscape in modern times, and Get ‘Em All, Kill ‘Em! (2004), an exploration of the nature of genocide that was a grief response to the accidental death of his adult daughter Rebekah after she was thrown from a horse.

In 2001 he was awarded the Herbert Schneider Award from the Society for the Advancement of American Philosophy. Upon retirement in 2009, he and his wife, Donna Esther Welch Wilshire, moved to Columbia, Missouri. During these final years he underwent the death of his wife and suffered a massive stroke a couple years before passing away on New Year's Day, 2013. He composed his final work in this period, The Much-at-Once: Music, Science, Ecstasy, the Body (New York: Fordham University Press, February 2016; ISBN 0823268349), which seeks to rediscover the fullness of life in the world by way of a more complete activation of the body's potentials; it is being published posthumously.

== Select publications ==
- Romanticism and Evolution: The Nineteenth Century (New York: Capricorn Books, 1968), volume 6 in The Spirit of Western Civilization, "a series of independent but related volumes on the dominant ideas of the great ages of Western Civilization." Wilshire wrote a 20-page introduction and brief commentaries on selections from Rousseau, Kant, Schiller, Blake, Wordsworth, Goethe, Coleridge, Emerson, Hegel, Marx, Mill, Darwin, Spencer, James, Baudelaire, Schopenhauer, Kierkegaard, Dostoevsky, and others.
- William James and Phenomenology: A Study of "The Principles of Psychology" (Bloomington: Indiana University Press, 1968; ISBN 0253190908).
- Role Playing and Identity: The Limits of Theatre as Metaphor (Bloomington: Indiana University Press, 1982; ISBN 0253205999, ISBN 978-0253205995). Wilshire places theater at the center of his study of human phenomenology.
- Wild Hunger: The Primal Roots of Modern Addiction (New York: Rowman & Littlefield, 1999; ISBN 0847689689) is an earnest examination of the roots of the addictive behaviors plaguing contemporary societies, which makes an impassioned plea for rediscovering our primal need for ecstatic involvement with the world and other human beings.
- Fashionable Nihilism: A Critique of Analytic Philosophy (Albany: State University of New York Press, 2002; ISBN 0791454290) is a collection of nine related essays. Wilshire criticizes the impersonal nature of analytic philosophy, and how it is overwhelmingly accepted by contemporary academia. The book has been criticized for neglecting to clearly define the analytic methods it criticizes, and for misrepresenting various authors and groups.
- Get 'Em All! Kill 'Em!: Genocide, Terrorism, Righteous Communities (Lanham, MD: Lexington Books, 2004; ISBN 0739112791) advances a comprehensive theory of genocide and terrorism, attempting to explain their motivations and receptions psychologically. In the book Wilshire analyzes five historical cases of genocide: "Nazis' in Europe, Serbs' in Bosnia, Pol Pot's group's in Cambodia, Hutus' in Rwanda, [and] whites' in California."
- The Much-at-Once: Music, Science, Ecstasy, the Body (New York: Fordham University Press, February 2016; ISBN 0823268349). Appealing to our powers of hearing and feeling, with a special emphasis on music, Wilshire engages composers, writers, and thinkers ranging from Beethoven and Mahler to Emerson and William James.
