= Rod L. Evans =

American philosopher

Rod L. Evans is an American philosopher, author, and lecturer who writes and speaks on ethics, religion, political philosophy, and English usage.

Evans graduated from Old Dominion University and received a Ph.D. in philosophy from the University of Virginia. He is currently Lecturer of Philosophy at Old Dominion University.

He has published seventeen books, including books about political philosophy, religion, lexicography, English usage, and recreational linguistics.

== Publications ==
- Alcohol and Drugs
- Fundamentalism: Hazards and Heartbreaks
- Drug Legalization: For and Against
- The Right Words
- The Quotable Conservative
- The Gilded Tongue
- The Artful Nuance: A Refined Guide to Imperfectly Understood Words in the English Language
- Thingamajigs and Whatchamacallits
- Tyrannosaurus Lex: The Marvelous Book of...Wordplay

== See also ==
- American philosophy
- List of American philosophers
