= Public Health Ethics =

- Discipline: Public health, bioethics
- Language: English
- Edited by: Lynette Reid, Kathryn MacKay

Publication details
- History: 2008–present
- Publisher: Oxford University Press
- Frequency: Triannual
- Impact factor: 4.3 (2025)

Standard abbreviations
- ISO 4: Public Health Ethics

Indexing
- ISSN: 1754-9973 (print); 1754-9981 (web)
- LCCN: 2008243858
- JSTOR: 17549973
- OCLC no.: 229430725

Links
- Journal homepage; Online archive

Public Health Ethics is a triannual peer-reviewed academic journal covering bioethics as it pertains to public health. It was established in 2008 and is published by Oxford University Press. The editors-in-chief are Kathryn MacKay (University of Sydney) and Lynette Reid (Dalhousie University). According to the Journal Citation Reports, the journal has a 2025 impact factor of 4.3.
