= Nancy S. Jecker =

American bioethicist, philosopher and author

Nancy Ann Silbergeld Jecker
- Born: October 25, 1960 (age 65)
- Education: Stanford University; University of Washington
- Scientific career
- Fields: Bioethics
- Workplaces: University of Washington

Nancy Ann Silbergeld Jecker (born October 25, 1960) is a bioethicist, philosopher, and author. She is Professor of Bioethics and Humanities at the University of Washington School of Medicine, Department of Bioethics and Humanities, with Adjunct Professorships at the university's Department of Philosophy, School of Law, and Department of Global Health. She also holds visiting professorships at the University of Johannesburg, Gauteng South Africa and the Chinese University of Hong Kong Centre for Bioethics

== Education ==
Jecker earned a bachelor's degree in philosophy from Stanford University (1982), and master's degrees in philosophy from both Stanford University (1982) and the University of Washington (1984). She was awarded the PhD in philosophy from the University of Washington (1986)

== Academic work ==
Jecker has published over 200 journal articles and chapters and 5 books. Her research focuses on justice, personhood and human dignity, individual and societal aging, medical futility, and global perspectives in philosophy and bioethics. Jecker's 2025 book (with coauthor Caesar Atuire), What is a Person? Untapped Insights from Africa proposes an emergent view of personhood that builds on insights from African and Western philosophy. Jecker’s 2020 book, Ending Midlife Bias: New Values for Old Age, coined the term, 'midlife bias,' to refer to the privileging of midlife values across the lifespan. Her other books include Wrong Medicine: Doctors, Patients and Futile Treatment, 2nd Edition, ; Bioethics: An Introduction to the History, Methods, and Practice, 3rd edition ; and Aging and Ethics: Philosophical Problems in Gerontology.

Jecker was elected President of the International Association of Bioethics (2022-2024). She was a three time recipient of the Japanese Society for the Promotion of Science International Fellow award (2025, 2021–2022, and 2018–2019) and a three time Rockefeller Foundation Fellowship awardee. Jecker was a visiting professor at the National University of Singapore Yong Loo Lin School of Medicine, Centre for Biomedical Ethics (2018); Scholar-in-residence at the Brocher Foundation in Geneva, Switzerland (2017); visiting professor at The University of Bucharest Research Institute, Romania (2017); and keynote speaker at the Israeli Ministry of Health (2017).

Jecker was elected to the board of directors for the International Association of Bioethics (2019–2028) and to the board of directors for the American Society for Bioethics and Humanities (2016–2019).

== Bibliography ==
=== Books ===
- Jecker NS, Atuire CA, 2025. What is a Person? Untapped Insights from Africa. Oxford University Press. ISBN 978-0-19-769092-5
- Jecker NS, 2020. Ending Midlife Bias: New Values for Old Age, Oxford University Press. ISBN 978-1-160-06870-3
- Schneiderman LJ, Jecker NS, 2021 (Japanese translation), 2015 (Chinese translation), 2011 (2nd edition), and 1995 (1st edition). Wrong Medicine: Doctors, Patients, and Futile Treatment, Johns Hopkins University Press. Japanese translation by Keiso Shobo Publishing Company, Toky. Chinese translation by Ho-Chi Book Publishing Company, New Taipei City,. E-Book by Amazon Digital Services, Inc.
- Jecker NS, Jonsen AR, Pearlman RA, editors, 2011 (3rd edition), 2007 (2nd edition), and 1997 (1st edition). Bioethics: An Introduction to the History, Methods, and Practice, Jones and Bartlett Publishers ISBN 978-0-7637-8552-9
- Jecker Nancy S, editor, 1991. Aging and Ethics: Philosophical Problems in Gerontology. Humana Press. . E-Book by Springer Publishers

=== Most cited journal articles ===
- Schneiderman LJ, Jecker NS, Jonsen AR. Medical futility: its meaning and ethical implications. Annals of internal medicine. 1990 Jun 15;112(12):949-54. (open access) (Cited 1450 times, according to Google Scholar)
- Schneiderman LJ, Jecker NS, Jonsen AR. Medical futility: response to critiques. Annals of Internal Medicine. 1996 Oct 15;125(8):669-74. (Cited 221 times, according to Google Scholar.)
- Jecker NS, Self DJ. Separating care and cure: An analysis of historical and contemporary images of nursing and medicine. The Journal of medicine and philosophy. 1991 Jun 1;16(3):285-306. Cited144 times.
- Shah SK, Miller FG, Darton TC, Duenas D, Emerson C, Lynch HF, Jamrozik E, Jecker NS, Kamuya D, Kapulu M, Kimmelman J. Ethics of controlled human infection to address COVID-19. Science. 2020 May 22;368(6493):832-4. (open access) (Cited 88 times,.)
- Jecker NS. You've got a friend in me: sociable robots for older adults in an age of global pandemics. Ethics and Information Technology. 2020 Jul 16:1-9. Cited 32 times.
- Jecker NS. Nothing to be ashamed of: sex robots for older adults with disabilities. Journal of Medical Ethics. 2021 Jan 1;47(1):26-32. (Cited 20 times)
