= Robert F. Almeder =

American philosopher

Robert Almeder
- Born: December 11, 1939 (age 86); Boston, Massachusetts
- Education: PhD in philosophy (University of Pennsylvania, 1969)
- Occupation: Professor Emeritus of Philosophy at Georgia State University.
- Known for: Philosophy of science, philosophy of mind, epistemology, ethics
- Awards: Outstanding Educator of America Award (1973); Georgia State University Alumni Distinguished Professor Award for College of Arts and Sciences (1984) and for University (1995)

Robert F. Almeder (born December 11, 1939, deceased April 19, 2026) is Professor Emeritus of Philosophy at Georgia State University. He is known in particular for his work on the philosophy of science, and has also written on the philosophy of mind, epistemology and ethics. He is the author of 24 books, including The Philosophy of Charles S. Peirce (1980), Death and Personal Survival (1992), Harmless Naturalism: The Limits of Science and the Nature of Philosophy (1998), Human Happiness and Morality (2000), and Truth and Skepticism (2010).

Almeder served as the editor of the American Philosophical Quarterly (1998–2003), and co-edited the annual Biomedical Ethics Reviews (1983–2004). He was the inaugural McCullough Distinguished Professor of Philosophy at Hamilton College in New York (2005–2007), where he taught courses on human rights, biomedical ethics and the law.

== Background ==
Almeder completed his PhD on "The Metaphysical and Logical Realism of Charles Peirce" at the University of Pennsylvania in 1969. Since then he has been the president of the Charles S. Peirce Society and president of the Georgia Philosophical Association. He joined the philosophy faculty at Georgia State University in 1972 as an associate professor, and became a full professor in 1980. He retired in 2005.

Almeder received the Outstanding Educator of America Award in 1973, and the Georgia State University Alumni Distinguished Professor Award for teaching and research in 1984 and 1995. He was the recipient of a Fulbright Scholarship in 1992 and then again in 2005.

Georgia State University instituted a student award in honour of Almeder upon his retirement, the Robert F. Almeder Prize, awarded to the student who writes the best paper at the annual Georgia State Student Philosophy Symposium.

== Views on mind ==
Almeder was strongly influenced by Charles Sanders Peirce, Ian Stevenson, and W.O. Quine, and subscribes to Cartesian dualism, broadly rejecting scientism and materialism. Stevenson's reincarnation research work on children who claimed to remember past lives convinced Almeder that minds are irreducible to brain states. He has argued in several papers and in his Beyond Death: The Evidence for Life After Death (1992) that Stevenson's critics, most notably the philosopher Paul Edwards, have misunderstood the nature of Stevenson's work.

== Editorial roles ==
Almeder served as the editor of the American Philosophical Quarterly from 1998–2003, and co-edited the annual Biomedical Ethics Reviews from 1983 to 2004. He has also served on several editorial boards, including:

- The American Philosophical Quarterly (1978–1998)
- The History of Philosophy Quarterly (1983–1994)
- The Journal of Business Ethics (1983–1996)
- Journal of Philosophical Research (1980–present)
- The Transactions of the Charles S. Peirce Society: A Quarterly Journal of American Philosophy (1980–present)
- The International Journal of Applied Philosophy (1982–present)
- The Journal of Value Inquiry (1991–present)
- Public Affairs Quarterly (1995–present)

== Works ==
=== Selected books ===
Almeder has authored and co-authored 24 books, including:

- (2010). Truth and Scepticism. Rowman and Littlefield.
- with James Humber (eds.). (1983–2004). Biomedical Ethics Reviews. Humana Publishing Corporation (new edition each year).
- with Cassandra L. Pinnick and Noretta Koertge (eds.) (2003). Scrutinizing Feminist Epistemology: An Examination of Gender in Science. Rutgers University Press.
- (2000). Human Happiness and Morality: A Brief Introduction to Ethics. Prometheus Press.
- (1998). Harmless Naturalism. Open Court.
- (1992). Death and Personal Survival: The Evidence for Life After Death. Rowman and Littlefield.
- with James Fetzer (1992). Glossary of Epistemology and Philosophy of Science. Paragon Press.
- with M. Snoeyenbos and J. Humber (eds.) (1992). Business Ethics: Corporate Values and Society. Prometheus Press (revised edition).
- (1991). Blind Realism: An Essay on Human Knowledge and Natural Science. Rowman and Littlefield.
- (1987). Beyond Death: The Evidence for Life After Death. Charles C Thomas; translated into Japanese, 1992.
- (1982). Praxis and Reason: Studies in the Philosophy of Nicholas Rescher. The University Press of America.
- (1980). The Philosophy of Charles S. Peirce: A Critical Introduction. Oxford: Basil Blackwell, and Rowman and Littlefield.
- with James Humber (eds.). (1979). Biomedical Ethics and the Law. Plenum Press.

=== Selected papers ===
- (2001). "On reincarnation: A reply to Hales", Philosophia.
- (1997). "Carnap and Quine on Empiricism", History of Philosophy Quarterly, Vol. 14, No. 3 (July), pp. 349–364.
- (1997). "A Critique of Arguments Offered Against Reincarnation", Journal of Scientific Exploration, 11(4), pp. 499–526.
- (1994). "Liberal Feminism and Academic Feminism", Public Affairs Quarterly, Vol. 8, No. 4 (October), pp. 299–315
- (1988). "Response to 'Past Tongues Remembered'," Skeptical Inquirer, vol. 12 (Spring).
- (1974). "Truth and Evidence", The Philosophical Quarterly, Vol. 24, No. 97 (October), pp. 365–368
