= Addison Webster Moore =

American philosopher

- Born: July 30, 1866; Plainfield, Indiana
- Died: August 25, 1930 (aged 64)

Addison Webster Moore (30 July 1866 – 25 August 1930) was a U.S. pragmatist philosopher. He was president of the Western Philosophical Association in 1911 and president of the American Philosophical Association in 1917.

He was born in Plainfield, Indiana, United States. He studied at DePauw University, earning an A.B. in 1890 and an A.M. in 1893. He then studied at Cornell (1893–94) and took his Ph.D. in 1898 at the University of Chicago, attracted by John Dewey's arrival there. When Dewey went to Columbia University in 1904, Moore took over the Metaphysics and Logic courses at Chicago, and became professor of philosophy in 1909.

Moore was a supporter of Dewey's instrumentalist version of pragmatism. In 1910, he published Pragmatism and Its Critics, consisting of one chapter explaining pragmatism and four chapters addressing criticisms directed towards this doctrine.

== Bibliography ==
- The functional versus the representational theories of knowledge in Locke's Essay, Chicago, The University of Chicago press, 1902.
- Existence, Meaning, and Reality in Locke's Essay and in Present Epistemology, Chicago, The University of Chicago Press, 1903.
- Pragmatism and its critics, Chicago, Ill., The University of Chicago press, 1910.
- with John Dewey (and al.), Creative intelligence : essays in the pragmatic attitude, New York : H. Holt and Company, 1917.
- The Collected Writings of Addison W. Moore, 3 vol., John R. Shook (ed.), Bristol: Thoemmes Press, 2003. ISBN 1-84371-002-1

== See also ==
- American philosophy
- List of American philosophers
