= Paul Saka =

American philosopher

Education
- Education: University of Arizona (PhD), University of Illinois at Urbana-Champaign (PhD), University of Chicago (BA)
- Theses: Lexical Decomposition in Cognitive Semantics (1991); Meaning and the Ascription of Attitudes (1998)

Philosophical work
- Era: 21st-century philosophy
- Region: Western philosophy
- Institutions: University of Texas Rio Grande Valley
- Main interests: philosophy of language, cognitive semantics

Paul Saka is an American scholar known for his multi-disciplinary work. He is a professor of philosophy at the University of Texas Rio Grande Valley and Associate Editor for the Internet Encyclopedia of Philosophy.

With one PhD in linguistics and another PhD in philosophy, his two dissertations argue against truth-conditional semantics and for a mentalist theory of meaning. The negative part of his program has been sharpened by his “argument from ignorance”. The positive part of his program includes a pioneering contribution on the semantics of pejorative language, plus work on ambiguity, the liar paradox, the problem of opacity, and quotation and the use-mention distinction.

== Books ==
- How to Think about Meaning, Springer (2007).
