= Stephen L. Esquith =

Stephen L. Esquith is a philosophy professor and the former Dean of the Residential College in the Arts and Humanities at Michigan State University. He earned his Ph.D. in political philosophy at Princeton University in 1979 and has taught courses at Michigan State University since 1980. Much of his current work deals with ethical issues in development.

== Contributions to Philosophy ==
Steve Esquith's work primarily focuses on philosophy of law, moral philosophy, political philosophy, and ethical problems in developing countries. Specifically, he started working in ethics and development in 1990 after returning from Poland where he was a Fulbright scholar. Esquith has written on topics such as "the rule of law, the problem of democratic political education, mass violence and reconciliation, and moral and political responsibility." In addition, he has been involved in several civic engagement projects within the public school system, led a study abroad program focusing on development in Mali, and spent an academic year as a senior Fulbright scholar at the University of Bamako where he taught courses on ethics and development at the Institut Polytechnic Rural and the Institut Supérieure de Formation et de Recherche Appliquée. Esquith served as chair of the philosophy department at Michigan State University before going on to become Dean of the Residential College in the Arts and Humanities. He also helped to found and serves as a co-leader of the doctoral specialization in Ethics and Development at MSU.

== Professional Publications ==
Esquith has written and/or presented over one hundred scholarly works during his career, but his primary scholarly contribution is Intimacy and Spectacle published by Cornell in 1994. This publication is an adroit critique of both modern and classical liberal political philosophy that was reviewed by several political philosophers. Currently, Esquith just completed a new book on the topic of mass violence and democratic political education entitled The Political Responsibilities of Everyday Bystanders and co-edited, with Dr. Fred Gifford, a volume of critical essays on ethics and development entitled Institutions and Urgency in Capabilities, Power, and Institutions: Towards a More Critical Development Ethics.

== Awards and Distinctions ==
In addition to being appointed Dean of the Residential College in the Arts and Humanities, Stephen Esquith is currently on the editorial board of the journal Polity and has been a senior Fulbright Scholar in both Mali and Poland. He has also been awarded several grants and awards including a Michigan State University Teacher-Scholar Award in 1984, a community service learning award in 1999 and several community engagement grants throughout his career.

== Selected works ==
- The Political Responsibilities of Everyday Bystanders (The Pennsylvania State University Press, 2010)
- Co-editor, with Fred Gifford, of Capabilities, Power, and Institutions: Towards a More Critical Development Ethics (The Pennsylvania State University Press, 2010)
- "Complicity in Mass Violence," Ethical Dimensions of Global Development, ed. Verna Gehring (Rowman and Littlefied, 2006)
- "Power, Poise, and Place: Toward an Emersonian Theory of Democratic Citizenship," The Emerson Dilemma: Essays on Emerson and Social Reform, ed. T. Gregory Garvey (University of Georgia Press, 2000)
- "War, Political Violence, and Service Learning," Teaching Philosophy, Vol. 23, No. 3, September 2000, pp. 241–54.
- "Toward a Democratic Rule of Law: East and West," Political Theory, Vol. 27, No. 3, June 1999, pp. 334–356
- Intimacy and Spectacle: Liberal Theory as Political Education (Ithaca: Cornell University Press, 1994), 285 pp. [reviewed in American Political Science Review, Vol. 89, No. 2, June 1995, p. 483; Political Theory, Vol. 24, No. 1, February 1996, pp. 120–28; Choice, Vol.32, No.10, June 1995; Ethics, Vol. 106, No. 4, July 1996, pp. 890–91; Journal of Politics, Vol. 58, No. 2, May 1996; Salesianum (in Italian), Vol.59, No.1, 1997, pp. 189–91.]
- Editor, Political Dialogue: Theories and Practices, in Poznan Studies in the Philosophy of the Sciences and the Humanities, Vol.46, (Amsterdam: Rodopi,1996), 355pp.
- Special Guest Editor with Marek Wilczynski, "The Transition to Democracy in Poland," Centennial Review, Vol. XXXVI, No. 1, Winter 1993, 246 pp.
- Special Guest Editor, "Ethics in the Professions," Centennial Review, Vol. XXXIV, No. 2, Spring 1990, 320 pp.

== See also ==
- American philosophy § 20th century
- List of American philosophers
