= Nalini Bhushan =

American philosopher

Nalini Bhushan is an American philosopher and the Andrew W. Mellon Professor in the Humanities at Smith College. Her work is on the philosophy of chemistry and Indian philosophy, among other subjects.

Lee C. McIntyre described Bhushan's edited volume Of Minds and Molecules (2000), co-edited with her husband Stuart Rosenfeld, as an effort to provide a "synthesis" of the field to date. A review in Philosophy of Science stated that the essays collected in Of Minds and Molecules were "helping" philosophy of chemistry "to take its place in the world of ideas". Another reviewer noted, however, that a number of anthologies of papers in the field had previously been published, and thus that the book's claim to be the "first" such anthology was probably inaccurate.

Her monograph Minds without Fear: Philosophy in the Indian Renaissance (2017), co-authored with Jay L. Garfield, argues that Indian intellectual life during the British Raj was vibrant—contrary to the assumptions of many scholars. Minds without Fear was the subject of several essays in a symposium in Sophia.

== Selected bibliography ==
- Bhushan, Nalini; Rosenfeld, Stuart M., eds. (2000). Of Minds and Molecules: New Philosophical Perspectives on Chemistry. Oxford: Oxford University Press. ISBN 978-0-19-535181-1. OCLC 352886903.
- Bhushan, Nalini; Garfield, Jay L. (June 22, 2017). Minds without Fear: Philosophy in the Indian Renaissance. Oxford University Press. doi:10.1093/oso/9780190457594.001.0001. ISBN 978-0-19-045759-4.
