= Leonard Linsky =

American philosopher

- Born: November 13, 1922; Chicago, Illinois, U.S.
- Died: August 27, 2012 (aged 89)

Education
- Education: University of California, Berkeley
- Thesis: A Study in Meaning: the Interchangeability of Expressions in Non-extensional Contexts (1949)

Leonard Linsky (November 13, 1922 – August 27, 2012) was an American philosopher of language. He was an Emeritus Professor of the University of Chicago.

== Philosophical work ==
Linsky was best known for work on the theory of reference, and also as a historian of early analytical philosophy. He is often cited as an example of the "orthodox view" in the theory of reference. He questioned the "intensional isomorphism" concept of Rudolf Carnap.

== Books ==
=== Authored ===
- Referring, London: Routledge & Keagan Paul, 1967.
- Names and Descriptions, Chicago: University of Chicago Press, 1977.
- Oblique Contexts, Chicago: University of Chicago Press, 1983.

=== Edited ===
- Semantics and the Philosophy of Language: A Collection of Readings, Urbana, Ill.: University of Illinois Press, 1952.
- Reference and Modality (Oxford Readings in Philosophy), Oxford: Oxford University Press, 1971.

== See also ==
- American philosophy
- List of American philosophers
