= David Manley (philosopher) =

American philosopher

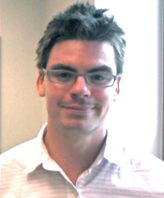
David Manley

David Manley is an American philosopher specializing in metaphysics, future technology, human reasoning, and global priorities. He formerly published widely in natural language semantics, ontology, and epistemology. He is Associate Professor of Philosophy at the University of Michigan, Ann Arbor, Michigan.

== Work ==
- John Hawthorne, David Manley (2012). The Reference Book. Oxford University Press. ISBN 978-0199693672.
- D. Chalmers David Manley and Ryan Wasserman, ed. (2009). Metametaphysics: New Essays on the Foundations of Ontology. Oxford University Press. ISBN 978-0199546046.
