= Michael Gelven =

American philosopher

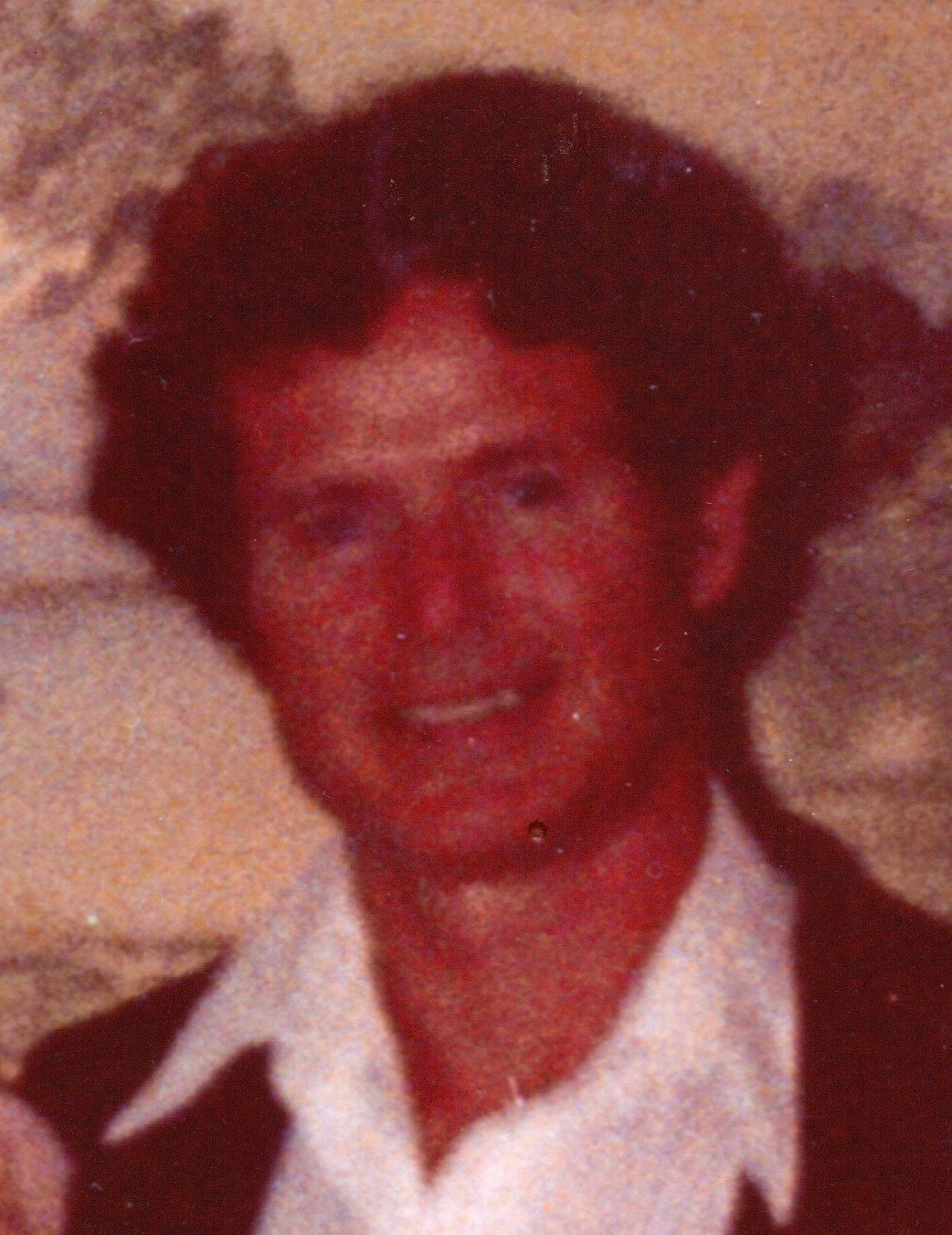
Michael Gelven

Michael Gelven (22 June 1937 – 1 June 2018) was an American philosopher and a Distinguished Research Professor Emeritus of Philosophy at Northern Illinois University, where he taught for 46 years.

Gelven was born in Missouri. He held a Ph.D. in philosophy from Washington University in St. Louis, penned a well-known commentary on Martin Heidegger's Being and Time, and wrote several books as well as numerous scholarly articles. Gelven was primarily interested in continental philosophy and had a wide range of specialties including metaphysics, Heidegger, Kant, Nietzsche, and philosophy of war.

== Bibliography ==
=== Books ===
- A Commentary on Heidegger's Being and Time (1st edition; 1970)
- Winter, Friendship, and Guilt: The Sources of Self-Inquiry (1973)
- A Commentary on Heidegger's Being and Time (2nd edition; Sep. 1989)
- Spirit and Existence: A Philosophical Inquiry (Aug. 1990)
- Truth and Existence: A Philosophical Inquiry (Nov. 1990)
- Why Me?: A Philosophical Inquiry into Fate (Nov. 1991)
- The Quest for the Fine (Jan. 1996)
- The Risk of Being: What It Means to Be Good and Bad (Nov. 1997)
- This Side of Evil (Jun. 1999)
- War and Existence: A Philosophical Inquiry (Jan. 2000)
- The Asking Mystery: A Philosophical Inquiry (Mar. 2000)
- Truth and the Comedic Art (Sep. 2000)
- What Happens to Us When We Think: Transformation and Reality (Jul. 2003)
- Judging Hope: A Reach to the True and the False (Jun. 2004)
- Why Johnny Can't Think: In the Name of "Openness," American Minds Have Been Closed (Dec. 2013)

=== Articles ===
- “Language as Saying and Showing,” Journal of Value Inquiry (1983)
- “The Literary and the True,” Man and World (1984)
- “Nietzsche's Existential Methodology,” Proceedings of the Heraclitean Society (1985)
- “Is Sacrifice a Virtue,” Journal of Value Inquiry (1987)

== See also ==
- American philosophy
