= Richard Martin =

Richard Martin or Richard Martyn may refer to:

== Entertainment ==
- Richard Martin (actor) (1917–1994), American actor
- Richard Martin (British director) (born 1935), British television director
- Richard Martin (Canadian director) (born 1956), Canadian film director
- Richard Martin (curator) (1947–1999), fashion historian, curator of the Metropolitan Museum of Art's Costume Institute
- Richard Martin, author of Coal Wars and featured in Bill Nye Saves the World
- Richard Martin, one of the many pen names of John Creasey

== Politics ==
- Richard Martin (lord mayor of London) (died 1617), Master of the Mint and Lord Mayor of London
- Richard Martin (Recorder of London) (1570–1618), lawyer and Recorder of London
- Richard Martin (Irish politician) (1754–1834), (a.k.a. "Humanity Dick"), Irish MP and campaigner against cruelty to animals
- Richard Martin (mayor of Swansea) (1843–1922), industrialist
- Sir Richard Martin, 1st Baronet, of Cappagh (1831–1901), Anglo-Irish baronet and privy counsellor
- Sir Richard Martin, 1st Baronet, of Overbury Court (1838–1916), English banker and Liberal Party politician
- Richard Martin (Missouri politician) (1915-1996), member of the Missouri House of Representatives
- Rick Martin (South Carolina politician) (born 1967), member of the South Carolina House of Representatives
- Richard Martyn (mayor of Galway) (c. 1602 – 1648), lawyer and member of the Catholic Confederates of Ireland
- Richard Martyn (New Hampshire politician) (1630–1694), State Representative in 1672 and 1679, and Speaker of the House in 1692

== Sports ==
- Richard Martin (cricketer) (1789–?), English cricketer
- Richard Martin (footballer, born 1962) (born 1962), French football player
- Richard Martin (footballer, born 1987) (born 1987), English football player
- Richard D. Martin (1932–2008), American football coach, athletic director and college conference administrator
- Rick Martin (Richard Martin, 1951–2011), Canadian ice-hockey player

== Other ==
- Richard Martin (martyr) (died 1588), English martyr
- Richard Martin (British Army officer) (1847–1907), British Army officer and colonial official
- Richard H. Martin Jr. (1858–1950), British architect in the U.S.
- Richard Milton Martin (1916–1985), American logician and philosopher
- Richard Frewen Martin (1918–2006), British test pilot
- Richard Beamon Martin (1913–2012), bishop in the Episcopal Church

== See also ==
- Dick Martin (disambiguation)
- Ricky Martin (disambiguation)
