= Sara Negri =

Mathematical logician

Sara Negri (born 21 January 1967) is a mathematical logician who studies proof theory. She is Italian, worked in Finland for several years, where she was a professor of theoretical philosophy in the University of Helsinki, and currently holds a position as professor of mathematical logic at the University of Genoa.

== Education and career ==
Negri was born in Padua, and studied at the University of Padua. She earned a master's degree there in 1991 and a Ph.D. in 1996, both in mathematics. Her dissertation, Dalla Topologia Formale all'Analisi, was supervised by Giovanni Sambin.

She went to Helsinki as a docent in 1998, and became a full professor there in 2015. She has also taken several visiting positions, including a Humboldt Fellowship in 2004 and 2005 at LMU Munich. She became full professor of mathematical logic at the University of Genoa, in Italy, in 2019.

== Recognition ==
Negri was elected to the Academia Europaea in 2018.

== Books ==
Negri is the co-author, with Jan von Plato, of two books:

- Structural Proof Theory (Cambridge University Press, 2001)
- Proof Analysis: A Contribution to Hilbert's Last Problem (Cambridge University Press, 2011)
