= Dickie Martin =

Dickie Martin may refer to:

- Harry B. Martin (1873 – 1959), American cartoonist and golf writer
- Richard Frewen Martin (1918 – 2006), British test pilot

== See also ==
- Dick Martin (disambiguation)
- Richard Martin (disambiguation)
