= Paul Hertz =

German scientist (1881-1940)

Paul Hertz (29 July 1881 – 24 March 1940) was a German-American theoretical physicist, mathematician, and philosopher.

Hertz was born in 1881 in Hamburg. He studied physics and mathematics in Heidelberg, Göttingen, Leipzig, and then again in Göttingen. He earned a PhD in 1904 as a student of Max Abraham. He published research in statistical mechanics, and later in the philosophy of science and mathematical logic. His work and proof systems anticipated key concepts in structural proof theory, and is now seen as a stepping stone to the creation of the sequent calculus by Gerhard Gentzen.

In 1933, Hertz was excluded from teaching in Nazi Germany for being Jewish, according to the Law for the Restoration of the Professional Civil Service. He first immigrated and lectured in Switzerland, and then moved to Prague, before moving to the United States in 1938 to be with the rest of his family. Hertz failed to establish himself professionally, and died in 1940 in Philadelphia, age 58.

An archive of Hertz's work is held in the University of Pittsburgh.
