= Dick Martin (disambiguation) =

Dick Martin may refer to:

- Dick Martin (1922–2008), American comedian, co-host of Rowan & Martin's Laugh-In
- Dick Martin (artist) (1927–1990), American illustrator, particularly associated with the Land of Oz
- Dick Martin (trade unionist) (1944–2001), Canadian trade unionist

== See also ==
- Dickie Martin (disambiguation)
- Richard Martin (disambiguation)
