= Tautology (rule of inference) =

Commonly used rules of replacement in propositional logic

In propositional logic, tautology is either of two commonly used rules of replacement. The rules are used to eliminate redundancy in disjunctions and conjunctions when they occur in logical proofs. They are:

The principle of idempotency of disjunction:

$$P \lor P \Leftrightarrow P$$

and the principle of idempotency of conjunction:
$$P \land P \Leftrightarrow P$$

Where "$\Leftrightarrow$" is a metalogical symbol representing "can be replaced in a logical proof with".

== Formal notation ==
Theorems are those logical formulas $\phi$ where $\vdash \phi$ is the conclusion of a valid proof, while the equivalent semantic consequence $\models \phi$ indicates a tautology.

The tautology rule may be expressed as a sequent:

$$P \lor P \vdash P$$

and

$$P \land P \vdash P$$

where $\vdash$ is a metalogical symbol meaning that $P$ is a syntactic consequence of $P \lor P$, in the one case, $P \land P$ in the other, in some logical system;

or as a rule of inference:

$$\frac{P \lor P}{\therefore P}$$

and

$$\frac{P \land P}{\therefore P}$$

where the rule is that wherever an instance of "$P \lor P$" or "$P \land P$" appears on a line of a proof, it can be replaced with "$P$";

or as the statement of a truth-functional tautology or theorem of propositional logic. The principle was stated as a theorem of propositional logic by Russell and Whitehead in Principia Mathematica as:

$$(P \lor P) \to P$$

and

$$(P \land P) \to P$$

where $P$ is a proposition expressed in some formal system.
