= F. S. C. Northrop =

American philosopher (1893–1992)

- Born: Filmer Stuart Cuckow Northrop; November 27, 1893; Janesville, Wisconsin, U.S.
- Died: July 21, 1992 (aged 98); Exeter, New Hampshire, U.S.
- Occupation: Legal philosopher
- Known for: The Meeting of East and West (1946)

Academic background
- Education: Beloit College (BA 1915); Yale University (MA 1919); Harvard University (MA 1922; PhD 1924)
- Doctoral advisor: Alfred North Whitehead

Academic work
- Institutions: Yale University (1923–1962)
- Doctoral students: Frederic Fitch

Filmer Stuart Cuckow Northrop (November 27, 1893 – July 21, 1992) was an American legal philosopher and influential comparative philosopher. He was known particularly for his work on Alfred North Whitehead and Albert Einstein, for work in the international peace movement, and for the book The Meeting of East and West (1946).

== Early life and education ==
Northrop was born November 27, 1893, in Janesville, Wisconsin.

After receiving a BA degree from Beloit College in 1915, serving in the US Army 1917–1919, and earning an MA from Yale University in 1919, he went on to Harvard University, where he earned another MA in 1922 and a PhD in the philosophy of science in 1924. At Harvard, Northrop studied under Alfred North Whitehead.

== Career ==
Northrop was appointed to the Yale University faculty in 1923 as an instructor in Philosophy, and later was named professor in 1932. In 1947 he was appointed Sterling Professor of Philosophy and Law. He chaired the philosophy department from 1938 to 1940 and was the first Master of Silliman College, from 1940 to 1947. He retired emeritus in 1962.

He was the author of twelve books and innumerable articles on all major branches of philosophy. Chapter-length studies of seven of these books can be found in Fred Seddon’s An Introduction to the Philosophical Works of F. S. C. Northrop. His most influential work, The Meeting of East and West, was published in 1946 at the aftermath of World War II. Its central thesis is that East and West both must learn something from each other to avoid future conflict and to flourish together. His jurisprudential work primarily concerned sociological jurisprudence.

Northrop was a regular attendee of the Macy Cybernetics Conferences in the 1940s and 1950s. In 1962, he gathered some of the key participants from those conferences (including Warren Sturgis McCulloch and Donald MacCrimmon MacKay) at a Wenner-Gren Foundation Symposium on the topic of The Determination of the Philosophy of a Culture. He also attended the International Meetings, conferences on contemporary issues and interfaith dialogue, at the monastery of Toumliline in Morocco in the late 1950s.

Northrop was personally acquainted with and close to a great number of leading figures in philosophy, politics, and science. These included G. H. Hardy, Bertrand Russell, Ludwig Wittgenstein, Erwin Schrödinger, Hermann Weyl, Norbert Wiener, Mao Zedong, John Foster Dulles and Mohammed Iqbal, among many others. For instance, see the dedication to Man, Nature, and God.

He was a fellow of the Amercian Academy of Arts and Sciences and a member of the American Academy of Political and Social Science.

== Death ==
Northrop married his first wife, Christine Johnston, on August 6, 1919, after returning from World War I US Army service. They remained married until her death in 1969, and then he married Marjorie Carey in 1969.

Northrop died in his sleep on July 21, 1992, at a nursing home in Exeter, New Hampshire.

== Selected works ==
- Science and First Principles, New York: The Macmillan Company, 1931. Reprinted in 1979, Ox Bow Press.
- The Meeting of East and West: An Inquiry Concerning World Understanding, New York: The Macmillan Company, 1946. Reprinted in 1979, Ox Bow Press.
- The Logic of the Sciences and the Humanities, New York: Meridian Books, Inc., 1947. Reprinted in 1983, Ox Bow Press.
- (ed.) Ideological Differences and World Order: Studies in the Philosophy and Science of the World's Cultures, New Haven: Yale University Press, 1949.
- The Taming of the Nations: A Study of the Cultural Basis of International Policy, New York: The Macmillan Company, 1952. Reprinted in 1987, Ox Bow Press.
- With Gross, Mason W. (eds.), Alfred North Whitehead: An Anthology, New York: The Macmillan Company, 1953.
- European Union and United States Foreign Policy: A Study in Sociological Jurisprudence, New York: The Macmillan Company, 1954.
- The Complexity of Legal and Ethical Experience: Studies in the Method of Normative Subjects, Boston: Little, Brown and Company, 1959. Reprinted in 1959, Greenwood Press.
- Philosophical Anthropology and Practical Politics, New York: The Macmillan Company, 1960.
- Man, Nature and God: A Quest for Life's Meaning, The Credo Series, Planned and edited by Ruth Nanda Anshen, paperback 1963. New York: A Trident Press Book, Simon and Schuster, December 1962.
- With Livingston, Helen H. (ed.), Cross-Cultural Understanding: Epistemology in Anthropology. New York: Harper & Row, 1964.
- The Prolegomena To a 1985 Philosophiae Naturalis Principia Mathematica, OxBow Press, Woodbridge, Conn. 1985

== Audio ==
- Lecture: "Cultural Mentalities and Medical Science" delivered June 28, 1956
