= Ricky Martin (disambiguation) =

Ricky Martin (born 1971) is a Puerto Rican musician.

It may also refer to:

- Ricky Martin (1991 album), an album by Ricky Martin
- Ricky Martin (1999 album), an album by Ricky Martin
- Ricky Martin, winner of The Apprentice (British series 8)

== See also ==
- Richard Martin (disambiguation)
