= Richard Milton Martin =

American philosopher (1916–1985)

- Born: 12 January 1916; Cleveland, Ohio
- Died: 22 November 1985 (aged 69); Milton, Massachusetts

Academic background
- Education: Harvard University, Columbia University, Yale University
- Thesis: A Homogeneous System for Formal Logic. (1941)
- Doctoral advisor: Frederic Fitch

Academic work
- Discipline: Philosophy, logic
- Institutions: University of Texas, New York University, Northwestern University

Richard Milton Martin (12 January 1916, Cleveland, Ohio – 22 November 1985, Milton, Massachusetts) was an American logician and analytic philosopher.

In his Ph.D. thesis written under Frederic Fitch, Martin discovered virtual sets a bit before Quine, and was possibly the first non-Pole other than Joseph Henry Woodger to employ a mereological system. Building on these and other devices, Martin forged a first-order theory capable of expressing its own syntax as well as some semantics and pragmatics (via an event logic), all while abstaining from set and model theory (consistent with his nominalist principles), and from intensional notions such as modality.

== Life and career ==
Richard Milton Martin was born on January 12, 1916 in Cleveland, Ohio to Frank Wade Martin and Lena Beatrice (Bieder).

From Harvard, where he had studied under Alfred North Whitehead during his last year before retirement, Martin earned an A.B. in 1938.

He then obtained an M.A. from Columbia (1939), and his Ph.D. from Yale (1941). His dissertation, supervised by.logician Frederic Fitch, was on “A Homogeneous System for Formal Logic.”

He was an instructor in mathematics at Princeton University 1942–44, then at the University of Chicago 1944–46. He then taught philosophy at Bryn Mawr College 1946–48, the University of Pennsylvania 1948–59, the University of Texas 1959–63 and at New York University 1963–73. From 1973 until his retirement in 1984 he taught at Northwestern University, Martin also held visiting appointments at Universitact Bonn, Yale, Universitact Hamburg, the New School for Social Research, and Temple University.

In 1976, Martin largely retired from teaching (only giving one course per year at Northwestern from then on) becoming a research associate with Boston University Center for the Philosophy and History of Science. He made excellent use of the resulting leisure, so that his final decade of life was by far his most productive, publishing over 100 book chapters and journal articles.

He published what Meguire describes as "the definitive treatment of his logic" within Semiotics and Linguistic Structure (1978). The next year saw the publication of his edited volume of the writings of Carolyn Eisele on Charles Sanders Peirce.

He also helped edit, and contributed chapters to, the Festschriften books The Logical Enterprise (1975) dedicated to Fitch, and Studies in the Philosophy of J. N. Findlay (1985). (Having been a colleague of J. N. Findlay at Austin, Texas.)

At the time of his death, Martin served on the editorial board of eight journals and on the advisory board of the Peirce Edition Project. In 1981, he became president of the Charles S. Peirce Society. In 1984, he was elected president of the Metaphysical Society of America, and he delivered their presidential address at Vanderbilt University in March 1985.

Despite having held tenure track appointments from 1948 until his retirement in 1984, the only Ph.D. thesis known to have been completed under Martin’s supervision is that of James Scoggin. Otherwise, Martin’s legacy is coextensive with his published writings.

Martin died at his home in Milton, Massachusetts, on November 22.

== Ideas ==
"...one of the most many-sided, prolific, and scholarly of analytic philosophers."

—Hans Burkhardt, Foreword to Metaphysical Foundations: Mereology and Metalogic.

Martin was part of the first wave of American analytic philosophers; arguably, only Quine (1908–2000), Fitch (1909–1987), and Henry Leonard (1905–1967) preceded him. His chronological elders Nelson Goodman (1906–1998) and Wilfrid Sellars (1912–1989) were arguably his contemporaries, as they all began their careers in earnest at about the same time, namely right after World War II. Martin's formal treatment of syntax followed Alfred Tarski; of semantics, Rudolf Carnap. Martin was generally well-disposed towards Carnap's work, contributed a long paper to the Schilpp volume on Carnap, and was seen as a disciple. Paradoxically, Martin was a positivist and radical nominalist who also sympathized with process theology and orthodox Christianity.

Between 1943 and 1992, Martin published 16 books and about 240 papers (of which 179 were included in his books) on an extraordinary range of subjects, including aesthetics, logic, the foundation of mathematics, metaphysics, syntax/semantics/pragmatics, the philosophy of science, phenomenology, process philosophy, theology, Frege, and C.S. Peirce. Martin preached and practiced that philosophy should be done formally, by employing first-order logic, the theory of virtual sets and relations, and a multiplicity of predicates, all culminating in an event logic. Starting with the papers reprinted in his 1969 Belief, Martin argued that the Frege's Art des Gegebensein was crucial to his thinking. Just what this Art entailed remains to be elucidated.

Martin was especially fond of applying his first-order theory to the analysis of ordinary language, a method he termed logico-linguistics. He often referenced the work of the linguists Zellig Harris (admiringly) and Henryk Hiz (more critically); Martin, Harris, and Hiz all taught at Pennsylvania in the 1950s. Yet Martin was dismissive of the related theoretical work by Noam Chomsky and his MIT colleagues and students. Ironically, Martin appears to have been Chomsky's main teacher of logic; while a student at Pennsylvania, Chomsky took every course Martin taught.

Quine's Word and Object cites Martin with approval, but Martin's wider impact has not been commensurate with the breadth and depth of his writings; the secondary literature on Martin consists of little more than reviews of his books.

== Quotations ==
“Over the portals of the entrance to contemporary philosophy is writ: Enter here fully equipped with the tools of the new logic.” Intension, p. 153.

“God made first-order logic and all the rest is the handiwork of man.” Semiotics, p. xv.

== Works ==
The first four titles below and the first part of Semiotics (1978) are monographs. The other titles are fairly loose collections of papers, most first published in journals.

- 1958. Truth and Denotation: A Study in Semantical Theory. University of Chicago Press.
- 1959. Toward a Systematic Pragmatics (Studies in Logic and the Foundations of Mathematics). Greenwood Press.
- 1959. The Notion of Analytic Truth. University of Pennsylvania Press.
- 1963. Intension and Decision. Prentice-Hall.
- 1969. Belief, Existence, and Meaning. New York University (NYU) Press.
- 1971. Logic, Language, and Metaphysics. NYU Press.
- 1974. Whitehead's Categorial Scheme and Other Papers. Martinus Neijhoff.
- 1978. Events, Reference, and Logical Form. Catholic University of America Press.
- 1978. Semiotics and Linguistic Structure. State University of New York (SUNY) Press.
- 1979. Pragmatics, Truth, and Language. Reidel.
- 1979. Peirce's Logic of Relations and Other Studies. Boston Studies in the Philosophy of Science. John Benjamins.
- 1980. Primordiality, Science, and Value. SUNY Press.
- 1981. Logico-Linguistic Papers. Foris (Netherlands).
- 1983. Mind, Modality, Meaning, and Method. SUNY Press.
- 1988. Metaphysical Foundations: Mereology and Metalogic. Philosophia Verlag.
- 1992. Logical Semiotics and Mereology. John Benjamins.

A complete bibliography of Martin's articles published in journals, conference proceedings, and books edited by others can be found in Meguire, Philip, 2005.

== See also ==
- American philosophy
- List of American philosophers
