= Richard Martin (footballer, born 1962) =

French footballer

Personal information
- Full name: Richard Martin
- Date of birth: October 5, 1962 (age 64)
- Place of birth: Avignon, France
- Height: 1.77 m (5 ft 9 1/2 in)
- Position: Striker

Senior career*
Years	Team	Apps	(Gls)
1981–1985	Avignon	68	(30)
1985–1989	Martigues	103	(34)
1989–1991	Chamois Niortais	12	(0)
1991–1992	Nyons	?	(?)
- * Club domestic league appearances and goals

Richard Martin (born October 5, 1962 in Avignon, France) is a former professional footballer who played as a striker.

Member of Sports Team
Team	Years Played	Matches	Goals Scored
Avignon Foot 84	1981-1985	68	30
FC Martigues	1985-1989	103	34
Chamois Niortais F.C.	1989-1991	12	0
