= Jan von Plato =

Finnish logician (b. 1951)

- Born: June 23, 1951 (age 75)

Jan von Plato (b. June 23, 1951) is a Finnish logician, mathematician, philosopher, and science historian. Since his retirement in 2017 he has led GODELIANA at the University of Helsinki. He received a 2.5 million euro grant from the European Research Council to decipher the coded notebook of Kurt Gödel, the Austrian mathematician and philosopher, written in Gabelsberger shorthand. von Plato received a second grant for HERITAGE, a research project transcribing works by Gödel, the German philosopher and mathematician Gerhard Gentzen, and Swiss Mathematician Paul Bernays, to study concepts in the foundations of modern logic.
