= Richard Martin (Missouri politician) =

American politician

Member of the U.S. House of Representatives from Missouri's 7th district

Missouri House of Representatives
- Incumbent
- Assumed office 1971

Personal details
- Born: 1915 Sedan, Minnesota, US
- Died: 1996 (aged 80–81) Dallas, Texas, US
- Party: Democratic
- Children: 3 (2 sons, 1 daughter)
- Occupation: attorney

Richard E. Martin (December 23, 1915 - December 16, 1996) was an American Democratic politician who served in the Missouri House of Representatives. He was born in Sedan, Minnesota and was educated at the University of Minnesota. His son John Richard Martin was a graduate of the United States Naval Academy and was killed in a plane crash on November 25, 1969, near Jacksonville, Florida.
