= Frederic Fitch =

American logician (1908–1987)

- Born: September 9, 1908; Greenwich, Connecticut, US
- Died: September 18, 1987 (aged 79); New Haven, Connecticut, US
- Known for: Fitch's paradox of knowability

Academic background
- Education: Yale University
- Doctoral advisor: F. S. C. Northrop

Academic work
- Discipline: Logic
- Institutions: Yale University
- Doctoral students: Alan Ross Anderson

Frederic Brenton Fitch (September 9, 1908 – September 18, 1987) was an American logician, a Sterling Professor at Yale University.

== Education and career ==
At Yale, Fitch earned his B.A in 1931 and his Ph.D. in 1934 under the supervision of F. S. C. Northrop. From 1934 to 1937 Fitch was a postdoc at the University of Virginia. In 1937 he returned to Yale, where he taught until his retirement in 1977.

His doctoral students include Alan Ross Anderson, Ruth Barcan Marcus, and William W. Tait.

== Work ==
Fitch was the inventor of the Fitch notation for arranging formal logical proofs as diagrams. In his 1963 published paper "A Logical Analysis of Some Value Concepts" he proves "Theorem 5" (originally by Alonzo Church), which later became famous in context of the knowability paradox.

Fitch worked primarily in combinatory logic, authoring an undergraduate-level textbook on the subject (1974), but he also made significant contributions to intuitionism and modal logic. He was interested in the problem of the consistency, completeness, categoricity, and constructivity of logical theories, especially non-classical logics, and contributed to the foundations of mathematics and to inductive probability. He dealt with the theory of references in "The Problem of the Morning Star and the Evening Star" (1949).

He also contributed to the philosophy of how logic relates to language.

== Works ==
- 1952: Symbolic Logic, An Introduction, The Ronald Press Company
- 1963: "A Logical Analysis of Some Value Concepts", doi:10.2307/2271594 (This paper has over 400 citations.)
- 1974: Elements of Combinatory Logic, Yale University Press
- 1975: (with Alan Ross Anderson, Ruth Barcan Marcus, and Richard Milton Martin): The Logical Enterprise. Yale University Press. 1975. ISBN 978-0-300-01790-8.

== See also ==
- Fitch notation
