= Gerhard Gentzen =

German mathematician (1909–1945)

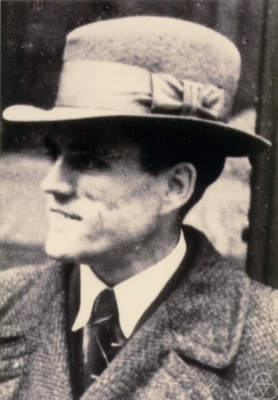
- Gentzen in 1945
- Born: 24 November 1909; Greifswald, Germany
- Died: 4 August 1945 (aged 35); Prague, Czechoslovakia
- Cause of death: Starvation
- Resting place: Ďáblice Cemetery
- Education: University of Göttingen
- Known for: Gentzen's consistency proof Gentzen's Hauptsatz; Gentzen's natural deduction calculus Gentzen's sequent calculus Gödel–Gentzen translation Analytic proof Ordinal analysis Proof-theoretic semantics
- Scientific career
- Fields: Mathematics
- Doctoral advisor: Paul Bernays

Gerhard Karl Erich Gentzen (24 November 1909 – 4 August 1945) was a German mathematician and logician. He made major contributions to the foundations of mathematics, proof theory, especially on natural deduction and sequent calculus. He died of starvation in a Czech prison camp in Prague in 1945.

== Life and career ==
Gentzen was a student of Paul Bernays at the University of Göttingen. Bernays was fired as "non-Aryan" in April 1933 and therefore Hermann Weyl formally acted as Gentzen's supervisor after that. Gentzen joined the Sturmabteilung in November 1933, although he was by no means compelled to do so. Nevertheless, he kept in contact with Bernays until the beginning of the Second World War. In 1935, he corresponded with Abraham Fraenkel in Jerusalem and was implicated by the Nazi teachers' union as one who "keeps contacts to the Chosen People." In 1935 and 1936, Hermann Weyl, head of the Göttingen mathematics department in 1933 until his resignation under Nazi pressure, made strong efforts to bring him to the Institute for Advanced Study in Princeton.

Between November 1935 and 1939 he was an assistant of David Hilbert in Göttingen. Gentzen joined the Nazi Party in 1937. In April 1939, Gentzen swore the oath of loyalty to Adolf Hitler as part of his academic appointment. From 1943 he was a teacher at the German Charles-Ferdinand University of Prague. Under a contract from the SS, Gentzen worked for the V-2 project.

Gentzen was arrested during the citizens uprising against the occupying German forces on 5 May 1945. He, along with the rest of the staff of the German University in Prague, were detained in a Soviet prison camp, where he died of starvation on 4 August 1945. He is probably buried in an unmarked grave at the Ďáblice Cemetery in Prague.

== Work ==
Gentzen's main work was on the foundations of mathematics, in proof theory, specifically natural deduction and the sequent calculus, building off of previous work of Paul Hertz. His cut-elimination theorem is the cornerstone of proof-theoretic semantics, and some philosophical remarks in his "Investigations into Logical Deduction", together with Ludwig Wittgenstein's later work, constitute the starting point for inferential role semantics.

One of Gentzen's papers had a second publication in the ideological Deutsche Mathematik that was founded by Ludwig Bieberbach who promoted "Aryan" mathematics.

Gentzen proved the consistency of the Peano axioms in a paper published in 1936. In his Habilitationsschrift, finished in 1939, he determined the proof-theoretical strength of Peano arithmetic. This was done by a direct proof of the unprovability of the principle of transfinite induction, used in his 1936 proof of consistency, within Peano arithmetic. The principle can, however, be expressed in arithmetic, so that a direct proof of Gödel's incompleteness theorem followed. Gödel used a coding procedure to construct an unprovable formula of arithmetic. Gentzen's proof was published in 1943 and marked the beginning of ordinal proof theory.

== Publications ==
- "Über die Existenz unabhängiger Axiomensysteme zu unendlichen Satzsystemen". Mathematische Annalen. 107 (2): 329–350. 1932. doi:10.1007/bf01448897. S2CID 119534269.
- "Untersuchungen über das logische Schließen. I". Mathematische Zeitschrift. 39 (2): 176–210. 1935a. doi:10.1007/bf01201353. S2CID 121546341. Archived from the original on 24 December 2015.

— (1964) [1935]. "Investigations into logical deduction". American Philosophical Quarterly. 1 (4): 249–287.

- "Untersuchungen über das logische Schließen. II". Mathematische Zeitschrift. 39 (3): 405–431. 1935b. doi:10.1007/bf01201363. S2CID 186239837.

— (1965) [1935]. "Investigations into logical deduction". American Philosophical Quarterly. 2 (3): 204–218.

- "Die Widerspruchsfreiheit der Stufenlogik". Mathematische Zeitschrift. 41: 357–366. 1936a. doi:10.1007/BF01180425. S2CID 122979277.
- "Die Widerspruchsfreiheit der reinen Zahlentheorie". Mathematische Annalen. 112: 493–565. 1936b. doi:10.1007/BF01565428. S2CID 122719892.
- "Der Unendlichkeitsbegriff in der Mathematik. Vortrag, gehalten in Münster am 27. Juni 1936 am Institut von Heinrich Scholz" [Lecture held in Münster on 27 June 1936 at the institute of Heinrich Scholz]. Semester-Berichte Münster (in German): 65–80. 1936–1937.
- "Unendlichkeitsbegriff und Widerspruchsfreiheit der Mathematik". Actualités scientifiques et industrielles. 535: 201–205. 1937.
- "Die gegenwärtige Lage in der mathematischen Grundlagenforschung". Deutsche Mathematik. 3: 255–268. 1938.
- "Neue Fassung des Widerspruchsfreiheitsbeweises für die reine Zahlentheorie". Forschungen zur Logik und zur Grundlegung der Exakten Wissenschaften. 4: 19–44. 1938.
- "Beweisbarkeit und Unbeweisbarkeit von Anfangsfällen der transfiniten Induktion in der reinen Zahlentheorie". Mathematische Annalen. 119: 140–161. 1943. doi:10.1007/BF01564760. S2CID 120335524.

=== Posthumous ===
- "Zusammenfassung von mehreren vollständigen Induktionen zu einer einzigen". Archiv für mathematische Logik und Grundlagenforschung (in German). 2 (1): 81–93. 1954. doi:10.1007/BF01969420.
- M. E., Szabo, ed. (1969). Collected Papers of Gerhard Gentzen. Studies in logic and the foundations of mathematics (Hardcover ed.). North-Holland. ISBN 0-7204-2254-X. - (English translation).
- "Der erste Widerspruchsfreiheitsbeweis für die klassische Zahlentheorie". Archiv für mathematische Logik und Grundlagenforschung. 16 (3–4): 97–118. 1974. doi:10.1007/BF02015370. S2CID 117444881. – Published by Paul Bernays.
- "Über das Verhältnis zwischen intuitionistischer und klassischer Arithmetik". Archiv für mathematische Logik und Grundlagenforschung. 16 (3–4): 119–132. 1974. doi:10.1007/BF02015371. S2CID 120131107. – Published by Paul Bernays.
- "The normalization of derivations". The Bulletin of Symbolic Logic. 14: 245–257. 2008. – Published by Jan von Plato.

== See also ==
- Bertrand Russell
