= List of Iran's parliament representatives (12th term) =

List of Iran's parliament representatives (12th term) or "List of the representatives of Iran's Islamic Consultative Assembly (12th term)" (Persian: فهرست نمایندگان دوره دوازدهم مجلس شورای اسلامی), is a list of the 290 members of Iran's Islamic Consultative Assembly in the 12th term, elected in 2024.

== Tasnim News version ==
Per Tasnim News on 12 May 2024, the list was as follows:

No.	Province	Constituency	Name	Political faction	List
1	Alborz province	Karaj, Eshtehard and Fardis	Ali Shirinzad	Principlist	Front of Islamic Revolution Stability
2	Alborz province	Karaj, Eshtehard and Fardis	Alireza Abbasi	Principlist	Front of Islamic Revolution Stability
3	Alborz province	Savojbolagh, Nazarabad and Taleqan	Ali Haddadi	Principlist	Coalition Council of Islamic Revolution Forces
4	Ardabil province	Ardabil, Namin, Nir and Sareyn	Ali Nikzad	Principlist	
5	Ardabil province	Ardabil, Namin, Nir and Sareyn	Ahad Biote	Principlist	
6	Ardabil province	Ardabil, Namin, Nir and Sareyn	Sadeif Badri	Principlist	
7	Ardabil province	Parsabad and Bilesavar	Ebrahim Fahimi	Independent	
8	Ardabil province	Germi	Mohammad Khosh Sima	Independent	
9	Ardabil province	Meshginshahr	Babak Rezazadeh	Independent	
10	Ardabil province	Khalkhal and Kowsar	Vahid Kanani	Reformists	Voice of the Nation
11	Bushehr province	Bushehr, Ganaveh and Deylam	Jafar Pour kabkani	Principlist	
12	Bushehr province	Dashti and Tangestan	Gholamhossein Zarei	Principlist	
13	Bushehr province	Dashtestan	Ebrahim Rezaei	Principlist	
14	Bushehr province	Kangan, Deyr, Jam and Asaluyeh	Mousa Ahmadi	Principlist	
15	Chaharmahal and Bakhtiari province	Shahrekord, Ben and Saman	Ahmad Rastineh Hafashjani	Principlist	
16	Chaharmahal and Bakhtiari province	Ardal, Farsan, Kuhrang and Kiar	Hamidreza Azizi	Principlist	
17	Chaharmahal and Bakhtiari province	Borujen	Gholamreza Mirzaei	Principlist	
18	Chaharmahal and Bakhtiari province	Lordegan	Seyyed Ruhollah Mousavi	Reformists	Voice of the Nation/Moderation and Development
19	East Azerbaijan province	Tabriz, Osku and Azarshahr	Masoud Pezeshkian	Reformists	Voice of the Nation/Moderation and Development/NEDA/National Trust
19	East Azerbaijan province	Tabriz, Osku and Azarshahr	Vacant from 28 July 2024		
20	East Azerbaijan province	Tabriz, Osku and Azarshahr	Ali Jafari Azar	Principlists	
21	East Azerbaijan province	Tabriz, Osku and Azarshahr	Ruhollah Motefaker Azad	Principlists	
22	East Azerbaijan province	Tabriz, Osku and Azarshahr	Reza Seddiqi	Principlists	
23	East Azerbaijan province	Tabriz, Osku and Azarshahr	Alireza Novin	Principlists	
24	East Azerbaijan province	Tabriz, Osku and Azarshahr	Alireza Monadi	Principlists	
25	East Azerbaijan province	Maragheh and Ajab Shir	Farid Mousavi	Reformists	Voice of the Nation/Moderation and Development
26	East Azerbaijan province	Marand and Jolfa	Ezzatullah Habibzadeh	Independent	
27	East Azerbaijan province	Mianeh	Mehdi Esmaeili	Principlists	
28	East Azerbaijan province	Mianeh	Maryam Abdulahi	Independent	
29	East Azerbaijan province	Sarab	Majid Basirpour	Reformists	Moderation and Development/NEDA/National Trust
30	East Azerbaijan province	Bonab	Mohammad Bagheri	Reformists	Voice of the Nation
31	East Azerbaijan province	Shabestar	Mahmoud Taheri	Independent	
32	East Azerbaijan province	Malekan	Zahra Khoddadi	Reformists	Voice of the Nation/Moderation and Development/NEDA
33	East Azerbaijan province	Ahar and Heris	Baitullah Abdullahi	Reformists	Voice of the Nation/Moderation and Development/NEDA/National Trust
34	East Azerbaijan province	Kaleybar, Khoda Afarin and Hurand	Behnam Rezvani	Independent	
35	East Azerbaijan province	Bostanabad	Gholamreza Nouri-Ghezeljeh	Reformists	Voice of the Nation/Moderation and Development/NEDA/National Trust
35	East Azerbaijan province	Bostanabad	Vacant from 21 August 2024		
36	East Azerbaijan province	Hashtrud and Charuymaq	Faramarz Shahsaviri	Independent	
37	East Azerbaijan province	Varzaqan	Reza Alizadeh	Principlists	
38	Fars province	Shiraz	Ismail Hosseini	Principlist	
39	Fars province	Shiraz	Rouhollah Nejabat	Principlist	
40	Fars province	Shiraz	Ja'far Ghaderi	Principlist	
41	Fars province	Shiraz	Ebrahim Azizi	Principlist	
42	Fars province	Abadeh, Bavanat and Khorrambid	Rahim Zarei	Principlist	
43	Fars province	Neyriz and Estahban	Farhad Tahmasebi	Principlist	
44	Fars province	Eqlid	Moslem Salehi	Principlist	
45	Fars province	Jahrom	Mohammad Reza Rezaei Kouchi	Principlist	
46	Fars province	Darab and Zarrin Dasht	Mohammad Javad Asgari	Principlist	
47	Fars province	Sepidan	Ardwan Akbarpour	Independent	
48	Fars province	Sarvestan, Kharameh and Kavar	Gholamreza Tawakkul	Principlist	
49	Fars province	Fasa	Hassan Ali Mohammadi	Principlist	
50	Fars province	Firuzabad, Farashband, Qir and Karzin	Mohammad Mehdi Farvardin	Principlist	
51	Fars province	Kazerun	Gholamreza Dehghan Naserabadi	Reformists	Voice of the Nation
52	Fars province	Larestan, Khonj and Gerash	Alaeddin Boroujerdi	Principlist	
53	Fars province	Lamerd and Mohr	Seyyed Mousa Mousavi	Principlist	
54	Fars province	Marvdasht, Pasargad and Arsanjan	Esfandiar Abdulahi	Independent	
55	Fars province	Mamasani	Omid Nasibi	Principlist	
56	Gilan province	Rasht	Jabbar Kouchakinejad Eram sadati	Principlist	
57	Gilan province	Rasht	Mahdi Falah	Principlist	
58	Gilan province	Rasht	Mohammadreza Ahmadi Sangari	Principlist	
59	Gilan province	Astara	Vali Dadashi	Independent	
60	Gilan province	Astaneh Ashrafiyeh	Ibrahim Najafi	Principlist	
61	Gilan province	Bandar-e Anzali	Ahmad Donyamali		
61	Gilan province	Bandar-e Anzali	Vacant from 21 August 2024		
62	Gilan province	Rudbar	Mehrdad Godarzvand Chegini	Independent	
63	Gilan province	Rudsar and Amlash	Mohammad Ali Jani	Independent	
64	Gilan province	Sowme'eh Sara	Saeed Rahmatzadeh	Principlist	
65	Gilan province	Talesh, Rezvanshahr and Masal	Yasser Islamdoost	Principlist	
66	Gilan province	Fuman and Shaft	Seyed Karim Masoumi	Principlist	
67	Gilan province	Lahijan and Siahkal	Salman Zare	Principlist	
68	Gilan province	Langarud	Mehrdad Lahoti	Reformists	Voice of the Nation/Moderation and Development/NEDA/National Trust
69	Golestan province	Gorgan and Aqqala	Ramezan ali Sangdoueini	Principlist	
70	Golestan province	Gorgan and Aqqala	Abdul Ghafoor Amanzadeh	Reformists	Voice of the Nation
71	Golestan province	Ramian and Azadshahr	Jamshid Qaim Maqam		
72	Golestan province	Aliabad	Rahmatollah Nourouzi	Principlist	
73	Golestan province	Kordkuy, Torkaman and Bandar-e Gaz	Abdoljalal Eiri	Principlist	
74	Golestan province	Gonbad-e Qabus	Abdul Hakim Aq Arkakli		
75	Golestan province	Minudasht, Kalaleh and Maraveh Tappeh	Seyyed Najib Hosseini	Reformists	Voice of the Nation
76	Hamadan province	Hamadan and Famenin	Hamid-Reza Haji Babaee	Principlist	
77	Hamadan province	Hamadan and Famenin	Abbas Sufi	Independent	
78	Hamadan province	Asadabad	Ali Akbar Ranjbarzadeh	Principlist	
79	Hamadan province	Bahar and Kabudrahang	Fathullah Tavasuli	Independent	
80	Hamadan province	Tuyserkan	Mohammad Mehdi Mofatteh	Principlist	
81	Hamadan province	Razan	Seyyed Abulhasan Mostafavi Ghamam	Principlist	
82	Hamadan province	Malayer	Ahad Azadikhah	Principlist	
83	Hamadan province	Malayer	Ahmed Aryainejad	Principlist	
84	Hamadan province	Nahavand	Alireza Nethari	Independent	
85	Hormozgan province	Bandar Abbas, Qeshm and Abumusa	Fatemeh Jarareh	Principlist	
86	Hormozgan province	Bandar Abbas, Qeshm and Abumusa	Ahmad Moradi		
87	Hormozgan province	Bandar Abbas, Qeshm and Abumusa	Mohammad Ashouri Taziani	Reformists	Voice of the Nation
87	Hormozgan province	Bandar Abbas, Qeshm and Abumusa	Vacant from 1 December 2024		
88	Hormozgan province	Bandar Lengeh, Bastak and Parsian	Ahmad Jabbari	Principlist	
89	Hormozgan province	Minab, Rudan, Jask and Sirik	Seyyed Abdul Karim Hashemi Nakhel Ebrahimi	Principlist	
90	Ilam province	Ilam, Eyvan, Shirvan, Chardavol and Mehran	Fereydon Hemati	Reformists	Voice of the Nation
91	Ilam province	Ilam, Eyvan, Shirvan, Chardavol and Mehran	Sara Falahi		
92	Ilam province	Dehloran, Darreh Shahr and Abdanan	Asadullah Cheraghi	Principlist	
93	Isfahan province	Isfahan	Amir Hossein Bankipour Fard	Principlist	
94	Isfahan province	Isfahan	Abbas Moghtadaei Khourasgani	Principlist	
95	Isfahan province	Isfahan	Mehdi Toghyani	Principlist	
96	Isfahan province	Isfahan	Rasool Bakhshi	Principlist	
97	Isfahan province	Isfahan	Hamed Yazdian	Principlist	
98	Isfahan province	Ardestan	Ahmad Bakshayesh Ardestani	Independent	
99	Isfahan province	Shahin Shahr and Meymeh and Bourkhar	Hossein-Ali Haji-Deligani	Principlist	
100	Isfahan province	Khomeyni Shahr	Mohammad Taghi Naghd Ali	Principlist	
101	Isfahan province	Semirom	Rahim Karimi		
102	Isfahan province	Shahreza and Semirom Sofla	Habib Ghasemi	Principlist	
103	Isfahan province	Faridan and Fereydunshahr	Ismail Siavashi	Principlist	
104	Isfahan province	Falavarjan	Ramezan Rahimi	Principlist	
105	Isfahan province	Kashan and Aran va Bidgol	Mustafa Moini	Principlist	
106	Isfahan province	Golpayegan and Khvansar	Seyyed Masoud Khatami	Principlist	
107	Isfahan province	Lenjan	Akbar Poladi Baghbadrani		
108	Isfahan province	Mobarakeh	Zahra Saidi	Reformists	Voice of the Nation
109	Isfahan province	Nain, Khur and Biabanak	Elham Azad	Independent	
110	Isfahan province	Najafabad, Tiran and Karvan	Abolfazl Aboutorabi	Principlist	
111	Isfahan province	Natanz and Qamsar	Hossein Abdoli	Reformists	Voice of the Nation
112	Kerman province	Kerman and Ravar	Shahbaz Hasanpour	Independent	
113	Kerman province	Kerman and Ravar	Majid Dostali	Principlist	
114	Kerman province	Baft, Rabor and Arzuiyeh	Yasser Soleimani	Independent	
115	Kerman province	Bam, Rigan, Fahraj and Narmashir	Mousa Ghazanfarabadi	Principlist	
116	Kerman province	Jiroft and Anbarabad	Behnam Saidi	Principlist	
117	Kerman province	Rafsanjan and Anar	Ahmad Anaraki Mohammadi	Reformists	Voice of the Nation/Moderation and Development/NEDA/National Trust
118	Kerman province	Zarand and Kuhbanan	Abdul Hossein Hemmati	Independent	
119	Kerman province	Sirjan and Bardsir	Mohammad Motamedizadeh	Principlist	
120	Kerman province	Shahr-e-Babak	Gholamreza Navidi	Principlist	
121	Kerman province	Kahnuj, Manujan, Rudbar-e Jonub, Qaleh Ganj and Faryab	Mansour Shokrollahi	Principlist	
122	Kermanshah province	Kermanshah	Abdolreza Mesri	Principlist	
123	Kermanshah province	Kermanshah	Mohammad Rashidi	Principlist	
124	Kermanshah province	Kermanshah	Fazlullah Ranjbar	Reformists	Voice of the Nation
125	Kermanshah province	Eslamabad-e Gharb and Dalahu	Mojtaba Bakhshipour	Reformists	Voice of the Nation
126	Kermanshah province	Paveh, Javanrud, Salas-e Babajani and Ravansar	Rastgar Yousefi	Principlist	
127	Kermanshah province	Sonqor	Seyyed Javad Hosseinikia	Principlist	
128	Kermanshah province	Qasr-e Shirin, Sarpol-e Zahab and Gilan-e Gharb	Fathullah Hosseini		
129	Kermanshah province	Kangavar, Sahneh and Harsin	Vahid Ahmadi	Principlist	
130	Khuzestan province	Ahvaz, Bavi, Hamidiyeh and Karun	Seyed Mohsen Mousavizadeh	Principlist	
131	Khuzestan province	Ahvaz, Bavi, Hamidiyeh and Karun	Mojtaba Yousefi	Principlist	
132	Khuzestan province	Ahvaz, Bavi, Hamidiyeh and Karun	Mohammad Amir	Principlist	
133	Khuzestan province	Abadan	Javad Saadounzadeh	Reformists	Voice of the Nation
134	Khuzestan province	Abadan	Seyyed Mohammad Molavi	Principlist	
135	Khuzestan province	Abadan	Jalil Mokhtar	Principlist	
136	Khuzestan province	Andimeshk	Jahanbakhsh Qalavand	Independent	
137	Khuzestan province	Izeh and Bagh-e Malek	Farshad Ebrahimpour Noorabadi	Principlist	
138	Khuzestan province	Mahshahr, Omidiyeh and Hendijan	Amir Hayat Moghadam	Principlist	
139	Khuzestan province	Behbahan and Aghajari	Mohammad Tala Mazloumi	Principlist	
140	Khuzestan province	Khorramshahr	Mustafa Maturzadeh	Principlist	
141	Khuzestan province	Dezful	Seyyed Ahmad Avayi	Principlist	
142	Khuzestan province	Dasht-e Azadegan and Hoveyzeh	Majid Dagheri	Principlist	
143	Khuzestan province	Ramhormoz and Ramshir	Amir Hossein Nazari		
144	Khuzestan province	Shadegan	Hashem Khanfari Pourjafari	Principlist	
145	Khuzestan province	Shush	Mohammad Kaab Omair	Principlist	
146	Khuzestan province	Shushtar and Gotvand	Seyyed Mohammad Sadat Ebrahimi	Reformists	Voice of the Nation
147	Khuzestan province	Masjed Soleyman, Andika, Lali and Haftkel	Ali Askar Zahiri Abdo Vand	Reformists	Voice of the Nation
148	Kohgiluyeh and Boyer-Ahmad province	Boyer-Ahmad and Dena	Mohammad Bahrami	Reformists	Voice of the Nation/Moderation and Development/NEDA/National Trust
149	Kohgiluyeh and Boyer-Ahmad province	Kohgiluyeh and Bahmaei	Seyyed Haji Mohammad Movahed	Principlist	
150	Kohgiluyeh and Boyer-Ahmad province	Gachsaran	Gholamreza Tajgardoon	Reformists	Voice of the Nation/Moderation and Development
151	Kurdistan province	Sanandaj, Diwandarreh and Kamyaran	Salar Moradi	Principlist	
152	Kurdistan province	Sanandaj, Diwandarreh and Kamyaran	Mohsen Fathi		
153	Kurdistan province	Bijar	Alireza Zandian	Principlist	
154	Kurdistan province	Saqqez and Baneh	Mohsen Bigleri	Reformists	Voice of the Nation/NEDA
155	Kurdistan province	Qorveh and Dehgolan	Mohammad Rasool Sheikhi	Principlist	
156	Kurdistan province	Marivan and Sarvabad	Omid Karimian	Reformists	Voice of the Nation/NEDA
157	Lorestan province	Khorramabad and Dowreh	Hadi Hashemi nia	Principlist	
158	Lorestan province	Khorramabad and Dowreh	Reza Sepahvand	Reformists	Voice of the Nation/Moderation and Development/NEDA
159	Lorestan province	Aligudarz	Hamidreza Godarzi	Reformists	Voice of the Nation
160	Lorestan province	Borujerd	Abbas Godarzi Boroujerdi	Principlist	
161	Lorestan province	Borujerd	Fatemeh Maghsoudi		
162	Lorestan province	Poldokhtar	Seyyed Hamid Reza Kazemi	Principlist	
163	Lorestan province	Delfan and Selseleh	Mohammad Hossein Mohammadi		
164	Lorestan province	Dorud and Azna	Ruhollah Lak Aliabadi	Principlist	
165	Lorestan province	Kuhdasht and Rumeshkan	Ali Emami Rad	Principlist	
166	Markazi province	Arak, Komijan and Khondab	Seyyed Mohammad Jamalian	Reformists	Voice of the Nation/Moderation and Development
167	Markazi province	Arak, Komijan and Khondab	Nadergholi Ebrahimi	Principlist	
168	Markazi province	Tafresh, Ashtian and Farahan	Valiullah Bayati	Independent	
169	Markazi province	Khomeyn	Mohammad Bayat	Independent	
170	Markazi province	Saveh and Zarandieh	Mohammad Sabzi	Principlist	
171	Markazi province	Shazand	Hoshang Hadianpour	Principlist	
172	Markazi province	Mahalat and Delijan	Mohammad Jalali	Principlist	
173	Mazandaran province	Sari and Miandorud	Allea Zamani Kiasari	Independent	
174	Mazandaran province	Sari and Miandorud	Ali Babaei Karnami	Principlist	
175	Mazandaran province	Babol	Hasan Netaj	Principlist	
176	Mazandaran province	Babol	Ahmad Fatemi	Independent	
177	Mazandaran province	Qaem Shahr, Savadkuh and Juybar	Emran Abbasi Kali	Reformists	Voice of the Nation/NEDA/National Trust
178	Mazandaran province	Qaem Shahr, Savadkuh and Juybar	Ali Keshvari	Independent	
179	Mazandaran province	Amol	Reza Hajipour	Principlist	
180	Mazandaran province	Behshahr, Neka and Galoogah	Gholamreza Shariati	Principlist	
181	Mazandaran province	Tonekabon, Ramsar and Abbasabad	Shamsuddin Hosseini	Principlist	
182	Mazandaran province	Nowshahr, Chalus and Kelardasht	Kamran Poladi		
183	Mazandaran province	Nur and Mahmudabad	Abdul Wahid Fayazi	Principlist	
184	Mazandaran province	Babolsar and Fereydunkenar	Ali Asghar Bagherzadeh	Principlist	
185	North Khorasan province	Bojnord, Maneh and Samalqan, Garmeh, Jajarm, Raz and Jargalan	Seyyed Mohammad Pakmehr	Principlist	
186	North Khorasan province	Bojnord, Maneh and Samalqan, Garmeh, Jajarm, Raz and Jargalan	Mohammad Mehdi Shahriari	Reformists	Voice of the Nation/Moderation and Development/NEDA/National Trust
187	North Khorasan province	Esfarayen	Hadi Ghavami	Reformists	Voice of the Nation/Moderation and Development
188	North Khorasan province	Shirvan	Abbas Godrati	Independent	
189	Qazvin province	Qazvin, Abyek and Alborz	Fatemeh Mohammad Beigi	Principlist	
190	Qazvin province	Qazvin, Abyek and Alborz	Sallar Velayatmadar	Principlist	
191	Qazvin province	Buin Zahra	Ruhollah Abbaspour	Principlist	
192	Qazvin province	Takestan	Abbas Bigdeli	Principlist	
193	Qom province	Qom	Mohammad Manan Raisi	Principlist	
194	Qom province	Qom	Mojtaba Zonnour	Principlist	
195	Qom province	Qom	Ghasem Ravanbakhsh	Principlist	
196	Razavi Khorasan province	Mashhad and Kalat	Nasrollah Pejmanfar	Principlist	
197	Razavi Khorasan province	Mashhad and Kalat	Hassan Ali Akhlaghi Amiri	Principlist	
198	Razavi Khorasan province	Mashhad and Kalat	Maytham Zuhorian	Principlist	
199	Razavi Khorasan province	Mashhad and Kalat	Javad Karimi-Ghodousi	Principlist	
200	Razavi Khorasan province	Mashhad and Kalat	Ali Asghar Nakhaee Rad	Principlist	
201	Razavi Khorasan province	Torbat-e Jam, Taybad and Bakharz	Othman Sallari	Reformists	Voice of the Nation/Moderation and Development
202	Razavi Khorasan province	Torbat-e Heydarieh and Mahvelat	Jalil Rahimi		
203	Razavi Khorasan province	Chenaran and Binalud	Hussein Emamirad	Principlist	
204	Razavi Khorasan province	Khaf and Roshtkhar	Amir Tavakoli Rudi	Reformists	Voice of the Nation/Moderation and Development/NEDA
205	Razavi Khorasan province	Dargaz	Hossein Mohammadzadeh	Reformists	Moderation and Development/NEDA/National Trust
206	Razavi Khorasan province	Sabzevar, Joghatai and Joveyn	Mohammad Reza Mohseni Thani	Reformists	Voice of the Nation/Moderation and Development
207	Razavi Khorasan province	Sabzevar, Joghatai and Joveyn	Behrouz Mohebi Najm Abadi	Principlist	
208	Razavi Khorasan province	Fariman and Sarakhs	Ehsan Ghazizadeh Hashemi	Principlist	
209	Razavi Khorasan province	Quchan and Faruj	Ali Azari	Principlist	
210	Razavi Khorasan province	Kashmar, Kuhsorkh, Bardaskan and Khalilabad	Javad Nikbin	Principlist	
211	Razavi Khorasan province	Gonabad and Bajestan	Hadi Mohammadpour	Principlist	
212	Razavi Khorasan province	Nishapur and Firuzeh	Seyyed Yahya Soleimani	Principlist	
213	Razavi Khorasan province	Nishapur and Firuzeh	Mohammad Rostami	Principlist	
214	Semnan province	Semnan and Mehdishahr	Abbas Golro	Principlist	
215	Semnan province	Damghan	Ali Akbar Alizadeh Barmi	Principlist	
216	Semnan province	Shahrud	Ahmed Ajam	Principlist	
217	Semnan province	Garmsar	Yasser Arabi		
218	Sistan and Baluchestan province	Zahedan	Hossein Ali Shahrari	Principlist	
219	Sistan and Baluchestan province	Zahedan	Fada Hossein Maleki	Principlist	
220	Sistan and Baluchestan province	Iranshahr, Sarbaz, Dalgan and Fanuj	Rahmdel Bagheri	Principlist	
221	Sistan and Baluchestan province	Chabahar, Nik Shahr, Konarak and Qasr-e Qand	Mohammad Anwar Bejarzehi	Principlist	
222	Sistan and Baluchestan province	Khash, Mirjaveh, Nosratabad and Kurin	Ali Kurd	Independent	
223	Sistan and Baluchestan province	Zabol, Zehak, Hirmand, Nimrouz and Hamun	Mohammad Sargazi	Principlist	
224	Sistan and Baluchestan province	Zabol, Zehak, Hirmand, Nimrouz and Hamun	Farhad Shahraki	Principlist	
225	Sistan and Baluchestan province	Saravan, Sib and Suran, Mehrestan	Mohammad Noor Dahani	Independent	
226	South Khorasan province	Birjand and Darmian	Seyyed Hasan Hashemi		
227	South Khorasan province	Nehbandan and Sarbisheh	Mostafa Nakhaei	Reformists	Voice of the Nation/NEDA
228	South Khorasan province	Qaen	Salman Eshaghi	Principlist	
229	South Khorasan province	Ferdows, Tabas, Sarayan and Boshruyeh	Majid Nasiraei	Principlist	
230	Tehran province	Tehran, Rey, Shemiranat, Eslamshahr and Pardis	Mohammad Bagher Ghalibaf	Principlist	
231	Tehran province	Tehran, Rey, Shemiranat, Eslamshahr and Pardis	Amir Hossein Sabeti	Principlist	
232	Tehran province	Tehran, Rey, Shemiranat, Eslamshahr and Pardis	Morteza Aghatehrani	Principlist	
233	Tehran province	Tehran, Rey, Shemiranat, Eslamshahr and Pardis	Hamid Rasai	Principlist	
234	Tehran province	Tehran, Rey, Shemiranat, Eslamshahr and Pardis	Reza Taghipour Anvari	Principlist	
235	Tehran province	Tehran, Rey, Shemiranat, Eslamshahr and Pardis	Mahmoud Nabavian	Principlist	
236	Tehran province	Tehran, Rey, Shemiranat, Eslamshahr and Pardis	Manouchehr Mutaki	Principlist	
237	Tehran province	Tehran, Rey, Shemiranat, Eslamshahr and Pardis	Ismail Kothari	Principlist	
238	Tehran province	Tehran, Rey, Shemiranat, Eslamshahr and Pardis	Mehdi Kochakzadeh	Principlist	
239	Tehran province	Tehran, Rey, Shemiranat, Eslamshahr and Pardis	Bijan Nobaveh-Vatan	Principlist	
240	Tehran province	Tehran, Rey, Shemiranat, Eslamshahr and Pardis	Mojtaba Zarei	Principlist	
241	Tehran province	Tehran, Rey, Shemiranat, Eslamshahr and Pardis	Kamran Ghazanfari	Principlist	
242	Tehran province	Tehran, Rey, Shemiranat, Eslamshahr and Pardis	Mohammad Siraj	Principlist	
243	Tehran province	Tehran, Rey, Shemiranat, Eslamshahr and Pardis	Ruhollah Izadkhah	Principlist	
244	Tehran province	Tehran, Rey, Shemiranat, Eslamshahr and Pardis	Ahmad Naderi	Principlist	
245	Tehran province	Tehran, Rey, Shemiranat, Eslamshahr and Pardis	Abolfazl Zohrevand	Principlist	
246	Tehran province	Tehran, Rey, Shemiranat, Eslamshahr and Pardis	Hossein Samsami	Principlist	
247	Tehran province	Tehran, Rey, Shemiranat, Eslamshahr and Pardis	Ibrahim Azizi	Principlist	
248	Tehran province	Tehran, Rey, Shemiranat, Eslamshahr and Pardis	Malek Shariati Niasar	Principlist	
249	Tehran province	Tehran, Rey, Shemiranat, Eslamshahr and Pardis	Alireza Salimi	Principlist	
250	Tehran province	Tehran, Rey, Shemiranat, Eslamshahr and Pardis	Zainab gheyseri	Principlist	
251	Tehran province	Tehran, Rey, Shemiranat, Eslamshahr and Pardis	Somayeh Rafiei	Principlist	
252	Tehran province	Tehran, Rey, Shemiranat, Eslamshahr and Pardis	Seyyed Ali Yazdikhah	Principlist	
253	Tehran province	Tehran, Rey, Shemiranat, Eslamshahr and Pardis	Ali Khezrian	Principlist	
254	Tehran province	Tehran, Rey, Shemiranat, Eslamshahr and Pardis	Peyman falsafi	Principlist	
255	Tehran province	Tehran, Rey, Shemiranat, Eslamshahr and Pardis	Abolghasem Jarare	Principlist	
256	Tehran province	Tehran, Rey, Shemiranat, Eslamshahr and Pardis	Seyyed Morteza Mahmoudi	Principlist	
257	Tehran province	Tehran, Rey, Shemiranat, Eslamshahr and Pardis	Zohreh Lajevardi	Principlist	
258	Tehran province	Tehran, Rey, Shemiranat, Eslamshahr and Pardis	Mojtaba Rahmandost	Principlist	
259	Tehran province	Tehran, Rey, Shemiranat, Eslamshahr and Pardis	Abdul Hossein Rooh Al Amini	Principlist	
260	Tehran province	Pakdasht	Farhad Bashiri	Principlist	
261	Tehran province	Damavand and Firuzkuh	Shahrukh Ramin	Reformists	Voice of the Nation
262	Tehran province	Baharestan and Robat Karim	Hassan Qashqai	Principlist	
263	Tehran province	Shahriari, Qods and Malard	Hossein Haghverdi	Principlist	
264	Tehran province	Varamin, Pishva and Qarchak	Mehdi Zamani Afshar		
265	West Azerbaijan province	Urmia	Seyyed Salman Zaker	Principlists	
266	West Azerbaijan province	Urmia	Hakem mamakan	Independent	
267	West Azerbaijan province	Urmia	Shahin Jahangiri	Independent	
268	West Azerbaijan province	Bukan	Mohammad Qassim Osmani	Reformists	Voice of the Nation
269	West Azerbaijan province	Piranshahr and Sardasht	Kamal Hosseinpour		
270	West Azerbaijan province	Khoy and Chaypareh	Adel Najafzadeh	Independent	
271	West Azerbaijan province	Salmas	Yaghoub Rezazadeh	Principlists	
272	West Azerbaijan province	Maku, Chaldoran, Poldasht and Showt	Omar pour Aghdam		
273	West Azerbaijan province	Mahabad	Sallam sotudeh	Independent	
274	West Azerbaijan province	Miandoab	Ali Ahmadi	Principlist	
275	West Azerbaijan province	Shahin Dezh and Takab	Mohammad Mirzaei	Reformists	Voice of the Nation
276	West Azerbaijan province	Naqadeh and Oshnavieh	Abdul Karim Hosseinzadeh	Reformists	Voice of the Nation/Moderation and Development/NEDA/National Trust
276	West Azerbaijan province	Naqadeh and Oshnavieh	Vacant from 30 October 2024		
277	Yazd province	Yazd and Ashkezar	Mohammad saleh Jokar	Principlist	
278	Yazd province	Ardakan	Mustafa Pourdehghan	Reformists	Voice of the Nation/Moderation and Development/NEDA/National Trust
279	Yazd province	Mehriz, Bafq, Behabad, Abarkuh and Khatam	Mohammad Reza Sabaghian	Reformists	Voice of the Nation
280	Yazd province	Taft and Meybod	Seyyed Jalil Mirmohammadi Meybodi	Principlist	
281	Zanjan province	Zanjan and Tarom	Mostafa Taheri	Principlist	
282	Zanjan province	Zanjan and Tarom	Nabiullah Mohammadi	Reformists	Voice of the Nation
283	Zanjan province	Abhar and Khorramdarreh	Mansour Alimardani	Reformists	Voice of the Nation
284	Zanjan province	Mah Neshan and Ijrud	Seyyed Jamal Mousavi	Principlist	
285	Zanjan province	Khodabandeh	Ahmed Bigdeli	Reformists	Voice of the Nation
286	Armenians (South)	——	Gaghard Mansourian	Independent	
287	Armenians (North)	——	Ara Shaverdian	Independent	
288	Zoroastrian	——	Behshid Barkhordar	Independent	
289	Jewish	——	Homayoun Sameh	Independent	
290	Assyrian	——	Sharli Envieh Takie	Independent	

== Other parliament members per other sources ==
Other sources indicate other members of the 12th parliament as follows:

- Mohsen Zanganeh was a member during 2025 and 2026 per Iran International.

== See also ==
- List of Iran's parliament representatives (11th term)
