= Raanan Gillon =

British medical academic

- ראנן גילון
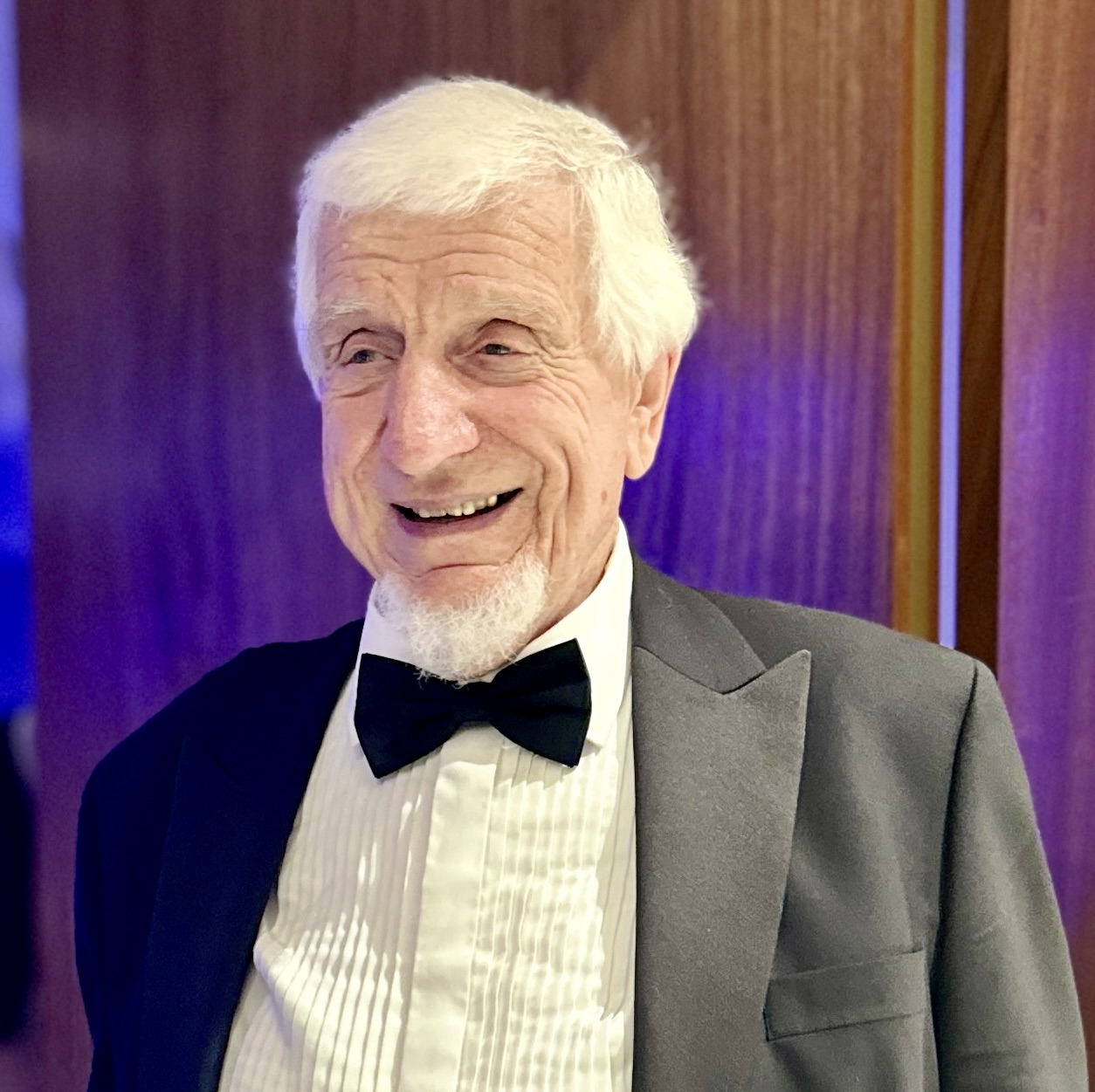
- Raanan Gillon (Royal College of Physicians, 2023)
- Born: 1941 (age 84–85); Jerusalem
- Medical career
- Profession: Physician
- Institutions: Imperial College London
- Sub-specialties: Medical ethics

Raanan Evelyn Zvi Gillon FRCP (Hebrew: רענן אביגדור צבי גלעון; born April 1941) is emeritus professor of medical ethics at Imperial College London, and past president of the British Medical Association.

A general practitioner until his retirement in 2002, Gillon edited the Journal of Medical Ethics from 1980 to 2002, and from 1995 to 1999 was professor at Imperial. He is an author on several works on medical ethics including Philosophical Medical Ethics.

Gillon is credited with making "a major philosophical contribution to critical thinking about moral issues raised by the practice of medicine" and with being "the leading British advocate and interpreter of Beauchamp and Childress's four principles approach" to moral reasoning in healthcare.

== Early life and education ==
Raanan Gillon was born in April 1941 in Jerusalem, to a Jewish father, Meir Selig Gillon, and English mother, Diana Gillon, who had converted to Judaism. At the age of seven, he moved with his family to London, where he attended Marlborough Primary School in Chelsea and the Anglican "Religious, Royal and Ancient Foundation" of Christ's Hospital School, also known as the Bluecoat School.

He resisted the school's encouragement to be confirmed in the Church of England and his father's efforts to have a Jewish Bar Mitzvah. He has been an atheist ever since, albeit one who is sympathetic to religion.

== Career ==
Gillon's interest in medical ethics was stimulated during his undergraduate training; during this time he won a British Medical Association (BMA) student essay prize on the set title "Suicide and Voluntary Euthanasia". Following his graduation from medicine in 1964, Gillon wished to pursue a doctorate in Medical Ethics, but was discouraged by Oxford University's Regius Professor of Medicine, Sir George Pickering, on the grounds that the topic was not one that could be studied. While he was rejected for a house (hospital training) post in paediatrics he was offered one in geriatrics, something he attributed to his prize-winning essay where he had argued for legalisation of physician assisted suicide and voluntary euthanasia, a position he now repudiates. Rejecting a position in geriatrics, he subsequently worked for seven years as a medical journalist for the Medical Tribune before returning to medical practice.

Following a number of "house jobs" he achieved membership of the Royal College of Physicians (RCP) and began working as a general practitioner. He once again attempted to pursue medical ethics but was told by professor David Hamlyn (UCL) that just as medical doctors were trained so were philosophers. Gillon subsequently enrolled on the philosophy undergraduate degree at Birkbeck College, London, on a part-time basis and graduated in 1979. He then registered for a PhD under the supervision of professor Roger Scruton on the topic of the concept of a person. However, in 1980 he was awarded the editorship of the Journal of Medical Ethics and so withdrew from his doctoral studies when he took up the post in 1981.

Gillon has been involved with the development of medical ethics in the UK since the 1970s and has been called the UK's leading advocate and interpreter of the four principles approach to medical ethics, pioneered by Beauchamp and Childress. Based on a series of articles written for the BMJ, Gillon's book Philosophical Medical Ethics has been reprinted 13 times and he is a member of the BMA's medical ethics committee. Between 1981 and 2001 he edited the Journal of Medical Ethics and he was a longstanding chairman of the Institute of Medical Ethics, where he is now honorary president. In 1986 he received a travel scholarship from the RCP to visit the United States and visit a number of centres that were teaching medical ethics.

In the late 1970s, assisting Michael Lockwood who introduced him to Beauchamp and Childress's principles of medical ethics, Gillon taught on the Worshipful Society of Apothecaries' course, DPMSA, on philosophical medical ethics, possibly the first such course in the UK. In 1983 he set up Imperial College's one week intensive course in medical ethics, one of the first courses on the subject in the UK. As of September 2017, the course continues to run and is advertised as running in September 2018.

In 2013, he was elected to the position of President of the Institute of Medical Ethics. He became a Trustee of London Nightline.

== Selected works ==
- Philosophical Medical Ethics. John Wiley & Sons, Great Britain, 1986.
- "Medical Ethics: Four Principles Plus Attention to Scope", British Medical Journal, Vol. 309, No. 6948 (16 July 1994), pp. 184–184.
- "Medical Ethics and Law as a Core Subject in Medical Education: A Core Curriculum Offers Flexibility in How It Is Taught—but Not That It Is Taught", British Medical Journal, Vol. 316, No. 7145 (30 May 1998), pp. 1623–1624. (With Len Doyal)
- "Ethics Needs Principles—four Can Encompass the Rest—and Respect for Autonomy Should Be ‘first Among Equals’", Journal of Medical Ethics, Vol. 29, No. 5 (2003), pp. 307–312.
- "Medical Ethics and Law for Doctors of Tomorrow: The 1998 Consensus Statement Updated", Journal of Medical Ethics, Vol. 36, No. 1 (2010), pp. 55–60. (With G.M. Stirrat, C. Johnston, & K. Boyd)

== Honours ==
- Honorary Doctor of Science, Oxford University.
- Henry Knowles Beecher award for contributions to ethics and the life sciences by the Hastings Center (1999). (joint with Alastair V. Campbell)
