= Kennedy Institute of Ethics =

Academic center at Georgetown University

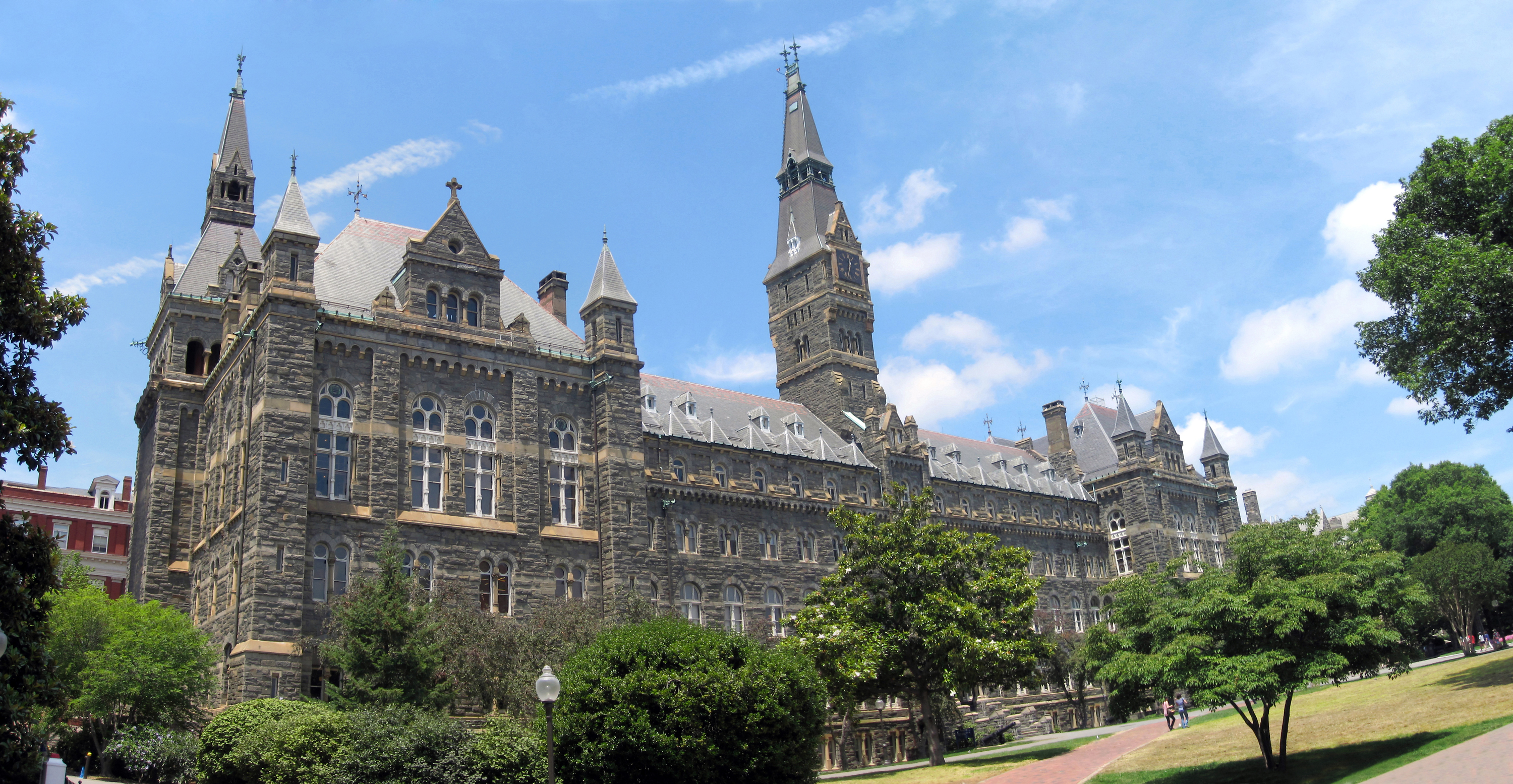
- The institute is located in Healy Hall
- Formation: 1971
- Type: Bioethics institute
- Location: Washington, D.C., United States
- Parent organization: Georgetown University
- Website: kennedyinstitute.georgetown.edu

The Kennedy Institute of Ethics (also known as Joseph and Rose Kennedy Institute of Ethics) is a bioethics institute in Washington, D.C. Located at Healy Hall, it was established at Georgetown University in 1971 as a bioethics center, think tank and library. Its first director, André Hellegers, said the institution's goal was to "bring expertise to the new and growing ethical problems in medicine today." The Joseph P. Kennedy Jr. Foundation granted $1.35 million to the Institute, contributing to the establishment of its Bioethics Research Library and providing for two Chairs. The Institute was soon in need of more financial support, which it received from Georgetown University and by several public, private and governmental grants. The philosopher Tom Beauchamp and the bioethicist Robert Veatch were among the first scholars to join the Kennedy Institute of Ethics. The institute features a top-ranked graduate program in applied ethics.

Scholars based at the Institute have included Johns Hopkins Berman Institute of Bioethics professor Ruth Faden, The Catholic University of America president Edmund Pellegrino and Ruhr University Bochum professor Hans-Martin Sass. Claire Lademacher, future Princess of Luxembourg, was a visiting scholar for a few months in the fall of 2012.

The Bioethics Research Library, founded by André Hellegers and the theology professor LeRoy Walters, was formalized in June 1973. Today it contains over 32,000 monographs, covering all fields of bioethics. The institute publishes the Kennedy Institute of Ethics Journal

== See also ==
- section link|Georgetown University Library|Bioethics Research Library
- Kennedy Institute of Ethics Journal
