= Charles Marriot Culver =

American psychiatrist (1934–2015)

Charles Culver
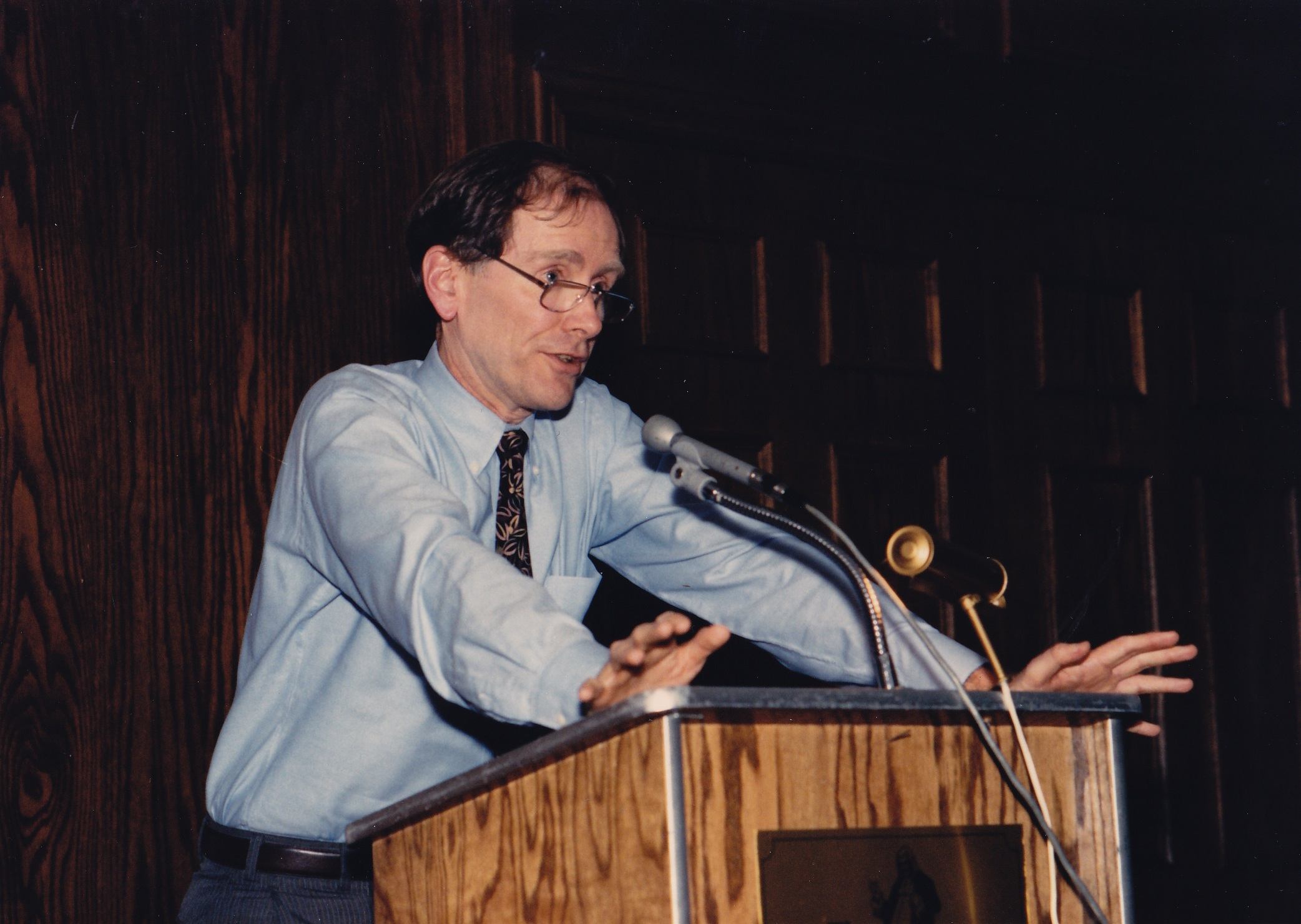
- Culver in 1989
- Born: Charles Marriot Culver; November 7, 1934; Akron, Ohio, U.S.
- Died: February 24, 2015 (aged 80); Miami, Florida, U.S.
- Education: Columbia University (B.A.) Duke University (PhD) Dartmouth College (MD)
- Occupation(s): Chairman and founder of DHMC Ethics Committee Co-founder of South Florida Bioethics/Health Law Working Group Associate Director Barry University Physician Assistant Program
- Years active: 1961–2010
- Known for: Founding of DHMC Ethics Committee, founding of bioethics field in the United States
- Medical career
- Profession: Ethicist Psychiatrist; College Professor Writer
- Sub-specialties: Medical Ethics, Bioethics, Genetics
- Awards: Fulbright Award (1990); Jabuti Prize (1996)

Charles Culver (November 7, 1934 – February 24, 2015) was a medical ethicist and a psychiatrist. He was primarily known for his work in medical ethics and his contributions in founding the field of bioethics in the United States.

== Biography ==
=== Early life ===
Culver was born on November 7, 1934, to Vernon and Virginia Culver. He attended Garfield High School in Akron, Ohio.

In 1951, Culver and his family moved to New York City, where he majored in psychology at Columbia University. Culver did his later studies at Duke University and did his residency in psychiatry at Dartmouth Hitchcock Medical Center.

=== Death ===
Culver died February 24, 2015, in Miami. He suffered from Parkinson's disease.
He is survived by his wife, Dr. Marta Culver, a psychiatrist; their son, Martin Culver; and Vicki, Elizabeth and Michelle, daughters by a previous marriage.

== Ethics reform in the United States ==
Culver was a pioneer in medical ethics. Up until the 1970s, not much work was ever done in the United States regarding the subject. Culver first received much of his national attention after publishing his article Basic Curricular Goals in Medical Ethics in the New England Journal of Medicine later in 1985. This article is said to have been distinguished for prompting much emphasis on medical ethics curriculum in United States medical education.

Along with other faculty at Dartmouth Hitchcock Medical Center (where Culver spent most of his career), Culver and others did extensive work on ethics consultation and moral theory. Soon thereafter Culver and one of his dear friends, Bernard Gert, would found the Dartmouth Hitchcock Medical Center Ethics Committee.

== Ethics Committees ==
=== Dartmouth Hitchcock Medical Center Ethics Committee ===
In 1975 Culver and Dartmouth College Stone Professor Bernard Gert, founded the Dartmouth Hitchcock Medical Center Ethics Committee. Its primary function was/and still is to provide thorough and in-depth ethic consultation at the hospital. The DHMC Ethics Committee was one of the first ever established in the world and can be said to have been one of Culver's greatest achievements. Due to its foundation, Dartmouth Medical School began requiring medical ethics courses in its curriculum.

In the latter part of the 1970s, the Dartmouth Hitchcock Medical Center Ethics Committee became known as the Mary Hitchcock Memorial Hospital Ethics Committee.

=== Mary Hitchcock Memorial Hospital Ethics Committee ===
The Mary Hitchcock Memorial Hospital Ethics Committees was arguably the first fully functional ethics committee in the world. Prior to its foundation, no such committee had ever done such extensive and landmark work. The committee became so large that it sponsored national conferences that were attended by students from leading American medical schools.

=== Political activism ===
The Mary Hitchcock Memorial Hospital Ethics Committee played pivotal roles in trying to enact laws that aimed at improving ethical patient care. The committee was active in the New Hampshire state legislature and played a central role in passing the Terminal Care Document and the Durable Power of Attorney for Health Care acts.

The committee also retained a notable regional influence and assisted other hospitals establish ethics committees. The Veterans Affairs Hospital in White River Junction, Vermont opened their ethics committee in 1980.

In 1992, Culver left Dartmouth–Hitchcock Medical Center, and psychiatrist Charles Solow, MD became chairman.

== International recognition ==
Culver did extensive work in Uruguay, Brazil and Argentina.

=== Uruguay ===
Upon being awarded the Fulbright award in 1990 for his nationwide contributions in the United States, Culver was asked to give several conferences pertaining to bioethics and medical ethics throughout Uruguay. Many of these conferences took place in the country's national Congress (The General Assembly of Uruguay), the Universidad Católica del Uruguay Dámaso Antonio Larrañaga as well as other institutions throughout Montevideo.

=== Argentina ===
After leaving Dartmouth in 1992, Culver taught classes at the only U.S-accredited school in Argentina, Asociación Escuelas Lincoln, and with the then dean of the school, Raymond McKay, helped establish the Lincoln University College, a program that allowed students to start their studies in Argentina and later transfer to a university in the United States with accredited courses.

=== Brazil ===
Culver gave several bioethics talks in São Paulo, Brazil. He was awarded the Jabuti Prize for the best medical book published in Brazil in 1996.

=== Barry University ===
Culver returned to the United States and settled in Miami, Florida, in 1994. He was associate director of Barry University's Physician Assistant Program, a program he helped found and accredit. At Barry University, he was also professor of medical education at the School of Graduate Medical Sciences.

=== University of Miami ===
For two decades Culver did extensive work with the University of Miami Miller School of Medicine and its bioethics program. He played an essential role in establishing the Bioethics Program national conference. It is one of the oldest and largest bioethics conferences in the world.

== South Florida Bioethics and Health Law Working Group ==
Culver was of the four founders of the University of Miami School of Law-sponsored South Florida Bioethics/Health Law Working Group, today known as the Bioethics and Health Law Consortium of South Florida.

== Publications ==
Culver, Charles M. and Gert, Bernard. Philosophy in Medicine. New York: Oxford, 1982. Oxford Japanese edition, Hokuju Shyyppan Co., Ltd., 1984. Translated by Massakatsu Okada and eight others. Excerpts from the book are reprinted in the following anthologies: Contemporary Issues in Bioethics, 2nd ed., edited by Thomas L. Beauchamp and LeRoy Walters, 1982, pp. 184 186; Bioemedical Ethics, 2nd ed., edited by Thomas A. Mappes and Jane S. Zembaty, 1986, pp. 409 415; and Bioethics: Readings and Cases, edited by Baruch A. Brody and H. Tristram Engelhardt Jr., 1987, pp. 55 57.

Culver, Charles M, Editor, Ethics at the Bedside. Hanover, N.H.: University Press of New England, 1990.

Gert, Bernard, Berger, Edward M., Cahill, George F. Jr., Clouser, K. Danner, Culver, Charles M., Moeschler, John B., and Singer, George H.S. Morality and the New Genetics. Portola Valley, CA: Jones and Bartlett, 1996.

Gert, Bernard, Culver, Charles M., and Clouser, K. Danner. Bioethics: A Return to Fundamentals. New York: Oxford University Press, 1997.

Gert, Bernard, Culver, Charles M. and Clouser, K. Danner. Bioethics: A Systematic Approach. New York: Oxford University Press. This book is in part a revision and second edition of Bioethics: A Return to Fundamentals. It was published by Oxford in 2006.
