= K. Danner Clouser =

American bioethicist

- Occupation: Philosopher
- Employer: Pennsylvania State University

K. Danner Clouser (26 April 1930 – 14 August 2000) was an American bioethicist.

He gained his bachelor's degree from the Lutheran Theological Seminary at Gettysburg in 1955, then completed a PhD at Harvard University in 1961. After having taught at Dartmouth College and Carleton College, he moved to the Pennsylvania State University, where he pursued his career and became University Professor of Humanities (emeritus). In 1968, he established one of the first humanities courses at the Pennsylvania State University College of Medicine. At Dartmouth College, he met several moral philosophers with whom he continued to collaborate: Bernard Gert, Charles M. Culver, and Ronald M. Green

As an associate editor of the Encyclopedia of Bioethics, he contributed to the development of American bioethics, where he advocated a "common morality" as opposed to classical principlism. One of his peers, Albert Jonsen, qualified him as being "the wittiest ethicist."

K. Danner Clouser died from pancreatic cancer.

== See also ==
- American philosophy
- List of American philosophers
- Principlism
