= Sepahvand =

Sepahvand is a Persian surname. Notable people with the surname include:

- Farzad Sepahvand (born 1986), Iranian Paralympic athlete
- Morteza Sepahvand (born 1979), Iranian boxer
- Reza Sepahvand, Iranian physicist and politician
