= Charles Culver =

Charles or Charlie Culver may refer to:

- Charles Vernon Culver (1830–1909), member of the U.S. House of Representatives from Pennsylvania
- Charles Marriot Culver (1934–2015), medical ethicist and psychiatrist
- Charlie Culver (1892–1970), American baseball player
