= Edmund Pellegrino =

American academic (1920–2013)

- Edmund D. Pellegrino

11th President of the Catholic University of America
- In office 1978–1982
- Preceded by: Clarence C. Walton, Ph.D.
- Succeeded by: Rev. William J. Byron, S.J.

Personal details
- Born: June 22, 1920 Newark, New Jersey
- Died: June 13, 2013 (aged 92)

Edmund Daniel Pellegrino (June 22, 1920 – June 13, 2013) was an American bioethicist and academic who served as the 11th president of The Catholic University of America (CUA) from 1978 to 1982. For 35 years, Pellegrino was a distinguished professor of medicine and medical ethics and the Director of the Kennedy Institute of Ethics at Georgetown University. Pellegrino was an expert both in clinical bioethics, and in the field of medicine and the humanities, specifically, the teaching of humanities in medical school, which he helped pioneer). He was the second layman to hold the position of President of Catholic University.

He was the Chairman of the President's Council on Bioethics, under the 43rd U.S. President, George W. Bush, and was the founder of the Edmund D. Pellegrino Center for Clinical Bioethics (renamed in his honor in 2013) at Georgetown University.

== Biography ==
Pellegrino was born in Newark, New Jersey and raised in Brooklyn, New York. He and his wife, Clementine Coakley Pellegrino, were married for 68 years, until her death in May, 2012. He was the father of seven children: Thomas (d. 2011); Stephen (d. 1981); Virginia; Michael; Andrea; Alice; and Leah. Pellegrino had two grandchildren, Daniel Pellegrino and Alice Cowan, and two great grandsons, Andrew Cowan and Stephen Pellegrino. A graduate of St. John's University and New York University, Dr. Pellegrino was the author of more than 575 published articles and chapters in medical science, philosophy and ethics. He served residencies in medicine at Bellevue Hospital, Goldwater Memorial Hospital, and Homer Folks Tuberculosis Hospital, following which he was a research fellow in renal physiology (kidney physiology) and renal medicine (nephrology) at New York University Medical Center. He served as a department chair and dean, as well as President of the Catholic University of America. Dr. Pellegrino was a Master of the American College of Physicians, a Fellow of the American Association for the Advancement of Science, a Hastings Center Fellow, and the recipient of more than 50 honorary degrees. The author of 11 books, Dr. Pellegrino's research interests included the history of medicine, the philosophy of medicine, professional ethics, the patient-physician relationship and biomedical ethics in a culturally pluralistic society. Dr. Pellegrino was a Senior Fellow of The Center for Bioethics And Human Dignity. Beginning in 1978, Pellegrino was appointed a professor of clinical medicine and community medicine at Georgetown University. In 1982, he was made the John Carroll Professor of Medicine and Medical Ethics and became the Director of the Kennedy Institute of Ethics in 1983. Pellegrino remained on the faculty at Georgetown until 2013 and, upon his retirement, the Edmund D. Pellegrino Center for Clinical Bioethics was renamed in his honor. In 1998, he was awarded the Laetare Medal by the University of Notre Dame, the oldest and most prestigious award for American Catholics.

Dr. Pellegrino had appeared on episode 11 on YouTube of "Da Ali G Show" on HBO, when Ali G conducts a panel on medical ethics with several renowned experts, including Dr. Pellegrino, pressing his guests on issues of cloning (why not clone Carmen Electra?), euthanasia (vs. "youth in Asia") and plastic surgery. Dr. Pellegrino's comment, "It's a matter of taste," has become one of the most paraphrased lines from the episode.

Academic offices
Preceded by Clarence C. Walton, Ph.D.	President of CUA; 1978–1982	Succeeded by Rev. William J. Byron, S.J.
