= Hans-Martin Sass =

German bioethicist (1935–2023)

Hans-Martin Sass (4 December 1935 – February 6, 2023) was a bioethicist. He was a Professor Emeritus of Philosophy at Ruhr University, Bochum, Germany, and a Senior Research Scholar Emeritus at the Kennedy Institute of Ethics at Georgetown University, Washington DC.

== Life ==
He held academic positions at People's University of China and Peking Union Medical College in Beijing, China, and at the Bochum Center for Medical Ethics, which he helped found in 1985, in Bochum, Germany. He was editor of the Ethik in der Praxis / Practical Ethics series at Lit Verlag (Münster, Germany) and the Medizinethische Materialien, Bochum. He was the author of over 250 articles and books. He was a member of the International Bioethics Committee of UNESCO and of many international and national advisory bodies and philosophical and bioethical journals.

An expert in European continental philosophy, he was widely published on Hegel, Marx, 19th- and 20th-century German philosophy, and liberal political theory. During his research, teaching, and consulting in cultural risk assessment, research ethics, clinical ethics, and public-health ethics, Dr. Sass developed cross-cultural perspectives in the major fields of bioethics (based on concepts of personal and professional responsibility), regulated markets, mutual trust, and partnership ethics.

Dr. Sass was a Rechtsritter ("Knight of Justice") of the Johanniterorden, the Order of Saint John (Bailiwick of Brandenburg).

== Death ==
Dr. Sass died unexpectedly on February 6, 2023. He was preceded in death by his wife, Renate, in 2004. He is survived by his daughters, Gabriele Sass and Angelika Sass; his granddaughters, Elisabeth and Anna; his sister, Annemarie Clarke; and his brother, Klaus Sass.

== Focus and interest ==
His main focus in bioethics was on the transition from paternalistic models of patient care towards partnership models between providers and customers of health care. He developed a widely used and translated ‘Interactive Post-Hippocratic Action Guide’ and other models for communication-in-trust and cooperation-in-trust interactions of individual, institutional and corporate persons in risk assessment, research and business ethics. His proposed virtues and principles for cross-cultural health care ethics include for the patient the balance between quality of life and length of life, individual self-determination and compliance with expert advice, for the expert the balance between professional responsibility and respect for clients’/patients’ autonomy, do-no-harm and do-good; trust, truthfulness and a prudent mix of solidarity and subsidiarity are important for all parties involved in the care for health, quality and happiness of life. His work included translation of the Values History (of Doukas and McCullough) from English to German allowing for dissemination of this advance directive instrument to be spread throughout Europe. He proposed that most ethical issues should be decided by risk-competent and health-literate citizens rather than bureaucracies and legislation, but that governments and institutions have the responsibility to introduce and to support health information and health competence as an essential part of educating risk-competent citizens for the 21st century.

As to health care reform and health education he defines in criticizing the WHO approach: Health is not just a status; rather the balanced result of health-literate and risk-competent care of one's own physical, emotional, and social well-being and well-feeling, achieved in competent understanding, modification and enhancement of individual genetic, social and environmental properties, with the support of health care professionals and through equal access health care services, including information, predictive and preventive medicine. He also was concerned that modern principles of bioethics do not put enough emphasis on professionalism and compassion in expert services and on developing and supporting better communication-in-trust and cooperation-in-trust models of provider-customer interactions. His most recent work include studies in cross-cultural bioethics and fundamentally common issues in different cultures of bioethics.

== Written works ==
- Health and Happiness of Political Bodies (2020 Lit)
- Cultures in Bioethics (2016, Lit: Zuerich)
- Bioethics and Biopolitics. Beijing Lectures by a European Scholar (2007, Chin/Engl, Xian:press.fmmu.sn.cn)
- Differentialethik (2006, Lit: Muenster, includes Bibliography pp. 247–274)
- "Emergency Management in Public Health Ethics". Eubios J Asian Intern Bioethics 2005;15(5)161-166
- "Ethical Dilemma in Stem Cell Research". Formosan J Medical Humanities 2005; 6(3&4)
- "E-Health: Health Promotion and Wellness Communities". Eubios J Asian Intern Bioethics 2004;14:170-174
- "Asian and Western Bioethics – Converging, Conflicting, Competing". Eubios. J Asian Intern Bioethics 2004; 14:13-22.
- "Formulating Global Post-Hippocratic Health Care Virtues". Europe Phil’s of Medicine & Health Care 2(1):6-10; also J Intern Bioethique 1995;6(1):5-7; Kos 1995; 118:46-51
- "Bochum Working Paper on the Practice of Medical Ethics" (with Herbert Viefhues, transl by Stuart Spicker), Bochum: Zentrum fuer Medizinische Ethik, January 1988
