= Principlism =

Type of applied ethics approach

Principlism is an applied ethics approach to the examination of moral dilemmas centering the application of certain ethical principles. This approach to ethical decision-making has been prevalently adopted in various professional fields, largely because it sidesteps complex debates in moral philosophy at the theoretical level.

Rather than engaging in abstract debate about the best or most appropriate approach at the normative level (e.g., virtue ethics, deontology or consequentialist ethics), principlism is purported to offer a practical method of dealing with real-world ethical dilemmas.

== Origins ==
The origins of principlism, as we know it today, are to be found in two influential publications from the late 1970s in the United States.

The Belmont Report.

The approach was first advocated by the National Commission for the Protection of Human Subjects of Biomedical and Behavioral Research in a document called the "Belmont Report". The Commission came into existence on July 12, 1974, when the National Research Act (Pub. L. 93-348) was signed into law. After nearly four years of monthly deliberations, the Commission met in February 1976 for four days at the Smithsonian Institution's Belmont Conference Center which resulted in a statement of three basic ethical principles: respect for persons, beneficence, and justice, for biomedical and behavioural research.

The approach was introduced for the second time by Tom Beauchamp and James Childress in their book Principles of Biomedical Ethics (1979), in which they state that the following four prima facie principles lie at the core of moral reasoning in health care: respect for autonomy, beneficence, non-maleficence, and justice. In the opinion of Beauchamp and Childress, these four principles are part of a "common morality"; an approach that "takes its basic premises directly from the morality shared by the members of society—that is, unphilosophical common sense and tradition."

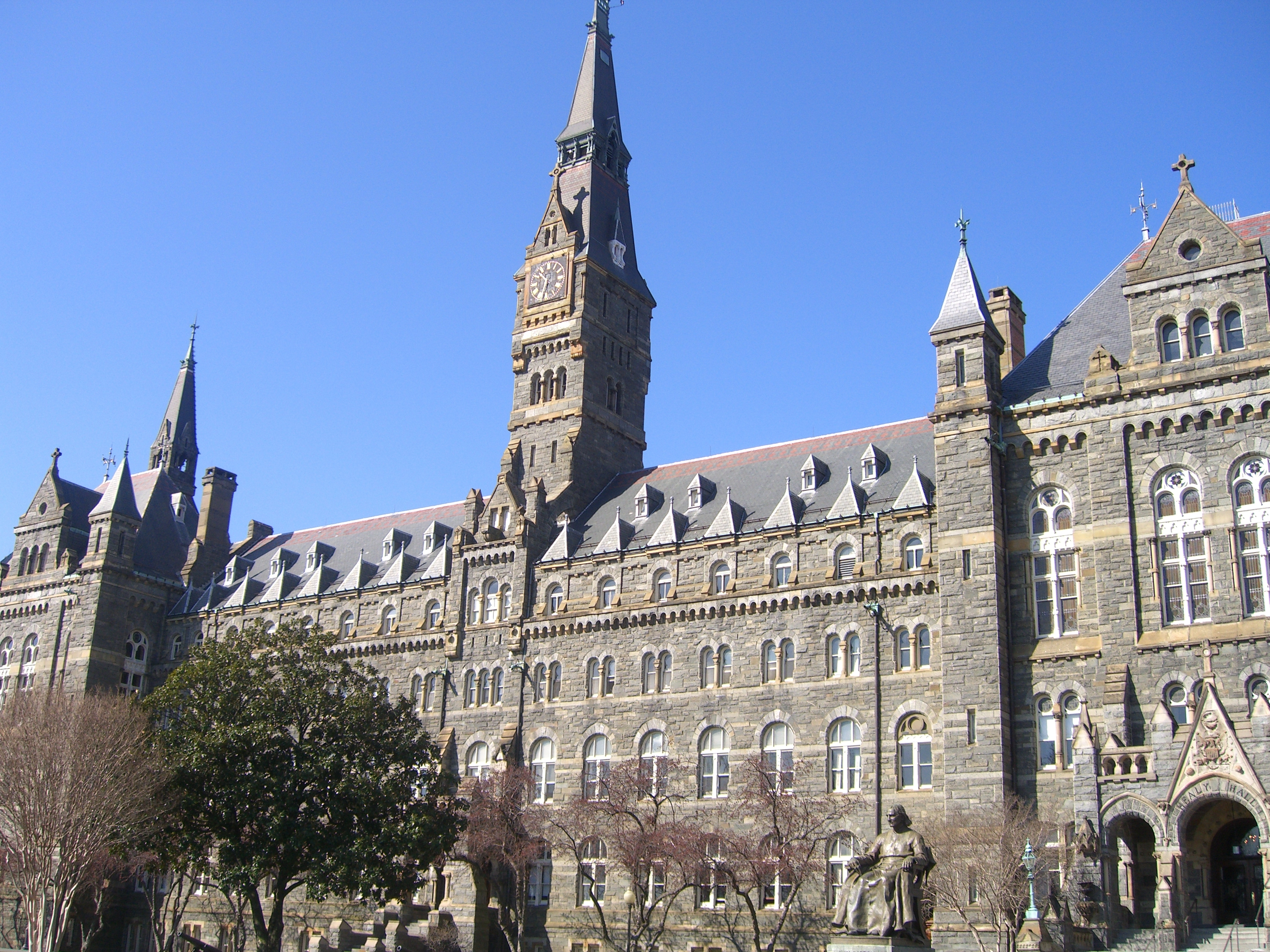
Georgetown University campus

The four principles are sometimes referred to as the Georgetown principles or the Georgetown mantra, so-called because both Beauchamp and Childress were based at Georgetown University when the first edition of Principles of Biomedical Ethics was published.

The principlist approach is derived from normative ethical thought, but it is not aligned to any one single theory. Whilst Beauchamp and Childress claim that these principles are commonly understood and accepted within society—and thus have a broad degree of support—they also assert that they are drawn from two normative ethical traditions: the duty-based moral philosophy (deontological approach) of Immanuel Kant; and the outcome-based (consequentialist) ethics of Jeremy Bentham and John Stuart Mill.

== The four principles ==
These ethical principles can be elucidated in slightly different ways, but the explanations provided by Beauchamp and Childress can be summarised as follows.

=== Respect for autonomy ===
This principle refers to the capacity of an individual to be self-determining and to make decisions for themselves without undue pressure, coercion or other forms of persuasion. It is contrasted with the notion of paternalism which occurs when actions of a health care practitioner override or do not seek to respect the wishes of the patient, believing that they are better able to decide what is in the patient's best interests. The doctor has no right to make important decisions on behalf of competent patients, as a general principle. Even where the doctor acts in the patient's interests, it is important that the patient's own choices and wishes be respected.

Respect for autonomy is operationalised through the requirement for informed consent whereby people who have the capacity for self-determination must be fully informed before being asked for their consent.

=== Beneficence ===
This principle describes an obligation to act for the benefit of others. Acting in this way might involve preventing or removing harm, or it might involve the active promotion of some good (e.g., health). The aim of beneficent action is to produce the "best" one can out of a range of possibilities. It can involve cost/benefit analysis such that the "best" here will be the possible action in which the benefits produced maximally outweigh the costs or the risks. Put simply, it is to act always in the best interests of the patient.

=== Non-maleficence ===
Duties of non-maleficence require refraining from causing harm (whether deliberately or through negligence). Generally, obligations of non-maleficence are more stringent than obligations of beneficence, but again a cost/benefit analysis may need to be undertaken to identify the best possible action. In some situations harm may be unavoidable and then we must be sure that the benefits outweigh the harm.

=== Justice ===
The principle of justice requires that we do what we can to ensure that costs and benefits are fairly distributed. It is possible to obey the principle of non-maleficence and the principle of beneficence, yet still not behave in an ethical manner, for these two principles say nothing about how benefits should be apportioned. In a given case it may well be that we can only procure a major benefit for some people by slightly harming the interests of others. The principle of beneficence may say we should go ahead, but then the benefits and costs would be unfairly distributed.

== As a practical approach ==
Principlism has evolved into a practical approach for ethical decision-making that focuses on the common-ground moral principles of autonomy, beneficence, nonmaleficence, and justice. The practicality of this approach is that principlism can be derived from, is consistent with, or at the very least is not in conflict with a multitude of ethical, theological, and social approaches towards moral decision-making. This pluralistic approach is essential when making moral decisions institutionally, pedagogically, and in the community as pluralistic interdisciplinary groups by definition cannot agree on particular moral theories or their epistemic justifications. However, pluralistic interdisciplinary groups can and do agree on intersubjective principles. In the development of a principlistic moral framework it is not a necessary condition that the epistemic origins and justifications of these principles be established. Rather the sufficient condition is that most individuals and societies, would agree that both prescriptively and descriptively there is wide agreement with the existence and acceptance of the general values of autonomy, nonmaleficence, beneficence, and justice.

Principlism is a useful addition to trauma-informed care frameworks.

== As a matter of debate ==
Principlism has been subjected to challenges since its introduction by Tom Beauchamp and James Childress in 1979. The term principlism itself was first presented, not by Beauchamp and Childress, but by two of the most vocal critics, K. Danner Clouser and Bernard Gert.

=== Criticism ===
Clouser and Gert assert that the principled approach lacks theoretical unity; the principles lack any systematic relationship because they are drawn from conflicting moral theories, and hence often lead to conflicting conclusions. The apparent "pick and mix" selection of certain theories and principles, without an underlying theoretical basis, is a cause of great concern for Clouser who states:

It is a kind of relativism espoused (perhaps unwittingly) by many books (usually anthologies) of bioethics. They parade before the reader a variety of "theories" of ethics—Kantianism, deontology, utilitarianism, other forms of consequentialism, and the like—and say, in effect, choose whichever of the competing theories, maxims, principles, or rules suits you for any particular case. Just take your choice! They each have flaws—which are always pointed out—but on balance, the authors seem to be saying, they are probably all equally good!

Others have objected to the choice or limitations of the particular principles, such as Herissone-Kelly (2003), who questions the argument that Beauchamp and Childress present in support of their global applicability; and Walker (2009), who believes that more principles need to be added if they are truly to represent a common sense morality.

Additionally, it has been suggested, that application of a principlist approach serves to exclude the moral agent—who performs the act—from the moral judgements; in order to see what is good and not merely what are the rights involved, we must consider the virtue and intentions of the person acting. For example, Häyry (2003), in his scrutiny of the objection that the "Georgetown principles" are not truly representative of European values (being more aligned with American liberalism), points to the lack of representation of virtue ethics within their chosen principles:

By ignoring moral (and religious) virtues, and thereby all deliberations about the ideal nature of a good, virtuous human being, Beauchamp and Childress left their views wide open to accusations of short-sighted hedonism; excessive individualism and sneaking nihilism.

=== Support ===
On the other hand, there are also staunch supporters of principlism such as Raanan Gillon who has claimed that the four principles can explain and justify all the substantive moral claims in medical ethics. According to Gillon, these principles provide a transcultural, transnational, transreligious, and transphilosophical framework for ethical analysis.

In spite of any shortcomings of the principlist approach in bioethical analysis, the perceived benefits have been significant as evidenced by its pervasive use. Principlism is by far the most dominant approach to ethical analysis in healthcare and the book Principles of Biomedical Ethics by Beauchamp and Childress remains the most influential book in modern bioethics.
