= Hume and the Problem of Causation =

1981 book by Tom Beauchamp and Alexander Rosenberg

- Author: Tom Beauchamp; Alexander Rosenberg
- Language: English
- Genre: Non-fiction
- Publisher: Oxford University Press
- Publication date: 1981

Hume and the Problem of Causation is a book written by Tom Beauchamp and Alexander Rosenberg, published in 1981 by Oxford University Press.

Beauchamp and Rosenberg developed a single interpretation of David Hume’s view on the nature of causation that rests on all of his works, and defended it against historical and contemporary objections. They argued in particular that Hume was not a skeptic about induction but sought to undermine a priori justifications of induction advanced by rationalist philosophers.

The book is now out of print.
