= Clarence C. Walton =

10th president of The Catholic University of America

Clarence Cyril Walton (June 22, 1915 – April 13, 2004) was the 10th president of The Catholic University of America and the first layman to hold the position. He was also the first to hold the title 'president' and not 'rector.'

== Early life ==
Clarence Walton was born in Scranton, Pennsylvania, to Leo and Mary Walton. His background has been described as working-class, his father worked for Delaware, Lackawanna and Western Railroad, and was of Irish American origin. In World War II he served in the United States Navy. He married Betty Kennedy in 1943 and with her had two children. His wife had also served during the war with WAVES.

== Education and career ==
He earned his bachelor's degree from the University of Scranton and a master's in history from Syracuse University. He also attended the then University of Geneva-affiliated Geneva Graduate Institute. His doctorate, also in history, came from The Catholic University of America. Following his studies, he taught history and political science at Duquesne University, the University of Scranton, and Columbia University.

Upon becoming president of The Catholic University of America, a student from Columbia University, where he served with distinction as Dean of the School of General Studies stated of him: "He's a really good guy in the American tradition. He comes on as almost goody-goody, at the same time he's a very clever, shrewd diplomat. He's genuinely liberally progressive." He also had a strong interest in business ethics and later taught it at Villanova University. Despite being called "liberally progressive" in 1969, and having critiqued capitalism, he has been described as a devout Catholic and thus banned Ti-Grace Atkinson from speaking at the University because of her views on the Blessed Virgin Mary. However this ban was overturned in court and he attended or observed the event. Due to this Patricia Buckley Bozell, who while listening to Atkinson ran to the podium to slap her for ridiculing the Virgin Birth then left, felt Walton to ultimately be weak and "sniveling" for following the court order and knowingly attending.

Academic offices
Preceded by Bishop William J. McDonald	President of CUA; 1969–1978	Succeeded by Edmund D. Pellegrino, M.D.
