= André Hellegers =

André Eugène Désiré Joseph Hellegers (June 9, 1926 – May 7, 1979) was a Dutch-born bioethicist and the first director of the Kennedy Institute of Ethics.

== Early life ==
Hellegers was born in Venlo, Netherlands on June 9, 1926. He graduated from University of Edinburgh Medical School in 1951, and became professor of obstetrics and gynecology at Johns Hopkins University in 1953. His experiences at the university greatly informed his later work on philosophy and biomedical ethics.

== Academic career ==
Beginning in 1964, Hellegers developed a deep interest in the growing field of bioethics. Hellegers organized the Kennedy Institute for the Study of Human Reproduction and Bioethics in 1971 and was its first director.

== Personal life ==
Hellegers died on May 7, 1979 at the age of 52.
