= Diploma in the Philosophy of Medicine =

Academic award in the UK

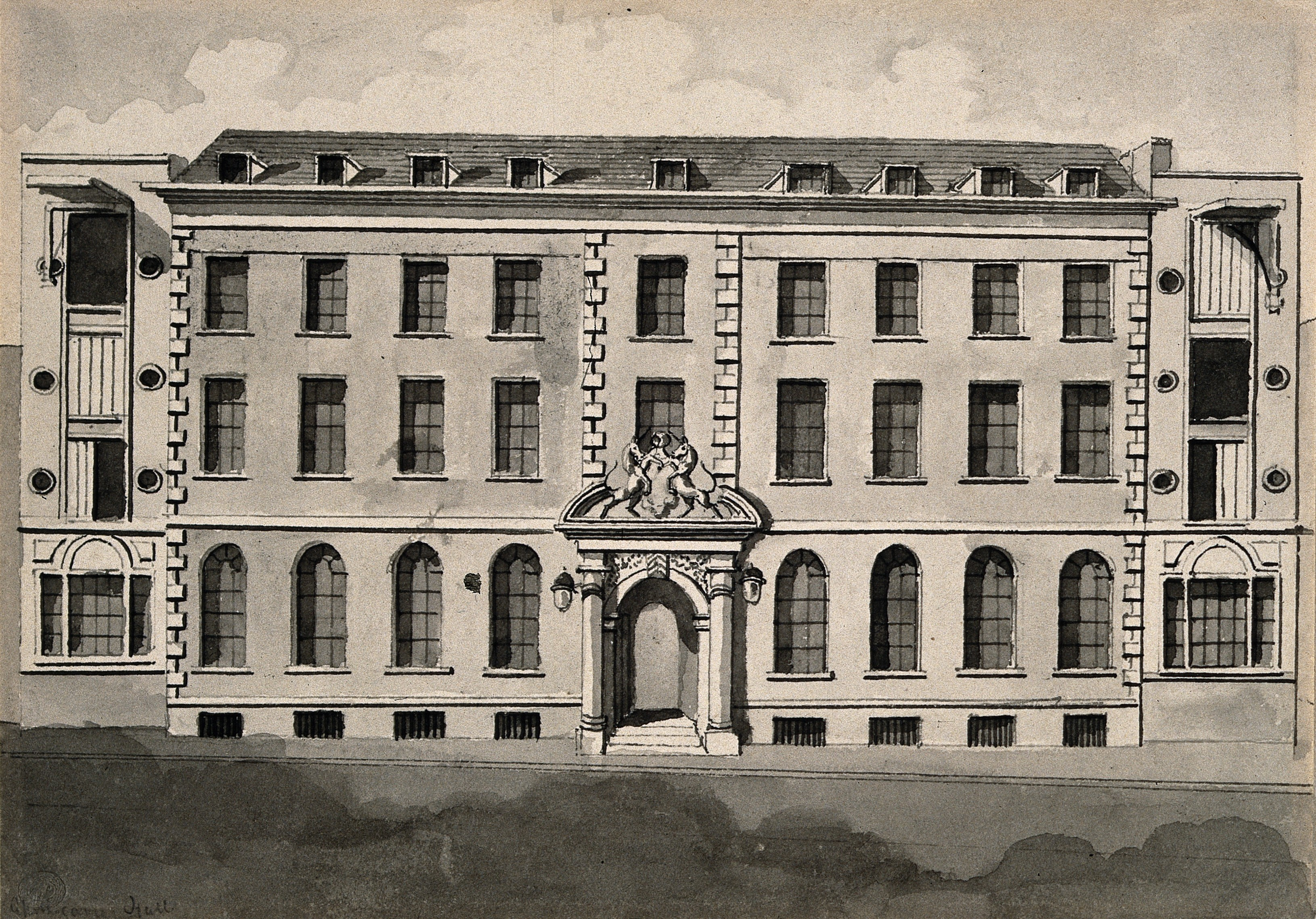
Apothecaries Hall

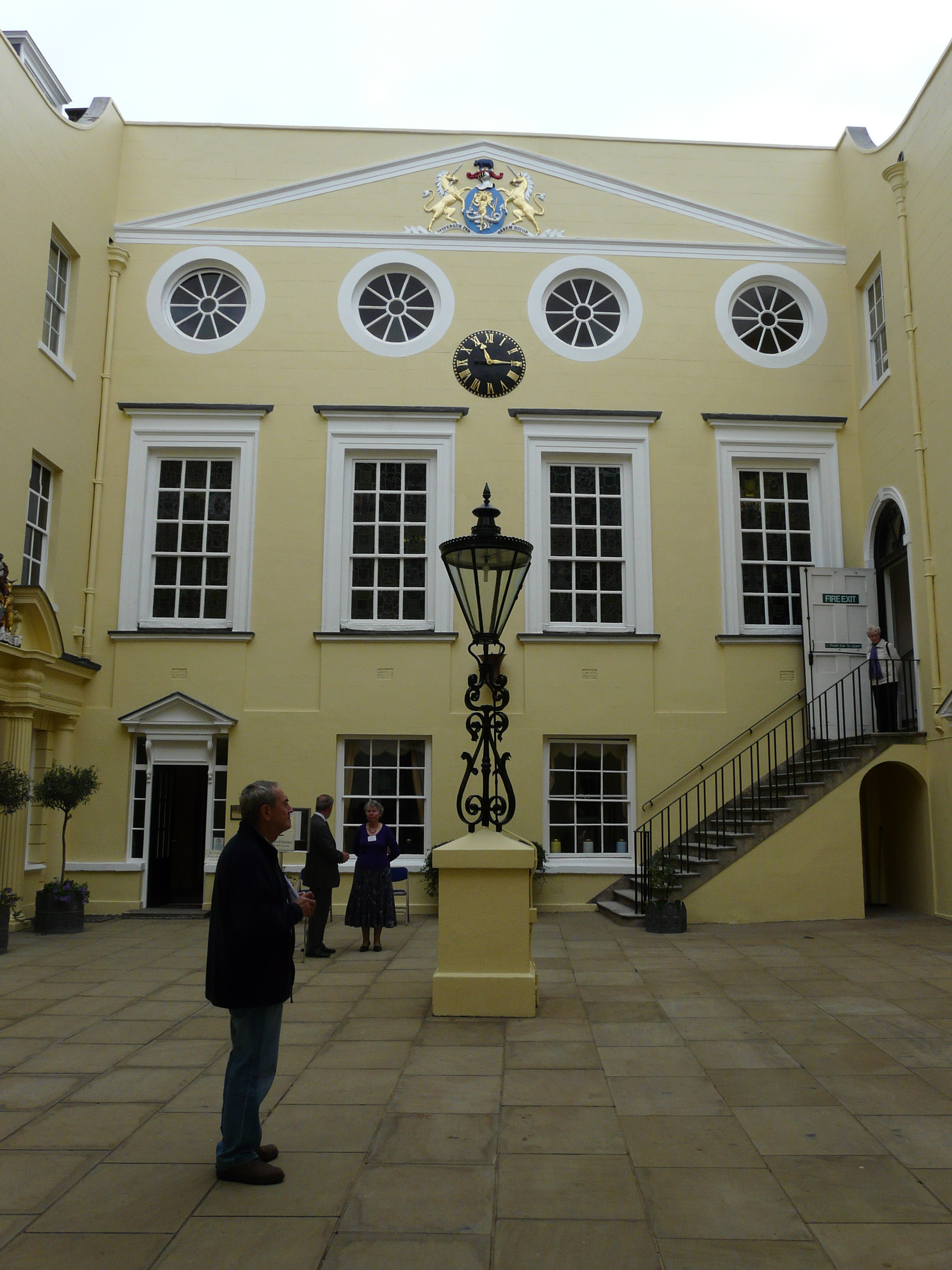
Apothecaries Hall Courtyard

The Diploma in the Philosophy of Medicine (DPMSA) is an academic award in the United Kingdom. It is awarded to students who have completed a one-year study of the philosophy of medicine in a course run by the Faculty of the History and Philosophy of Medicine and Pharmacy, and have passed an examination.

Many UK medical schools require their students to complete a project called a student-selected component. One of the required topics includes medical ethics. The diploma is accredited for many medical schools and has an annually-awarded prize.

== History ==
The curriculum was created by Michael Lockwood in 1978, with assistance from Raanan Gillon. Its structure reflects philosophical developments as applied to medicine. It is the oldest philosophy and ethics of medicine and healthcare course in the UK. Previously, the diploma was earned after a two-year study period on alternating Saturdays, and was predominantly attended by graduates and medical students. After an extensive revision in 1993, the course was shortened to one year and opened up to a wider range of students.

== Exam ==
Students must maintain a 70% attendance record and receive passing grades on a final written paper, dissertation and essay to be awarded the diploma.
