= William Joseph McDonald =

Irish-American Catholic bishop (1904–1989)

His Excellency, The Most Reverend William J. McDonald
- Auxiliary Bishop of San Francisco; Titular Bishop of Aquae Regiae
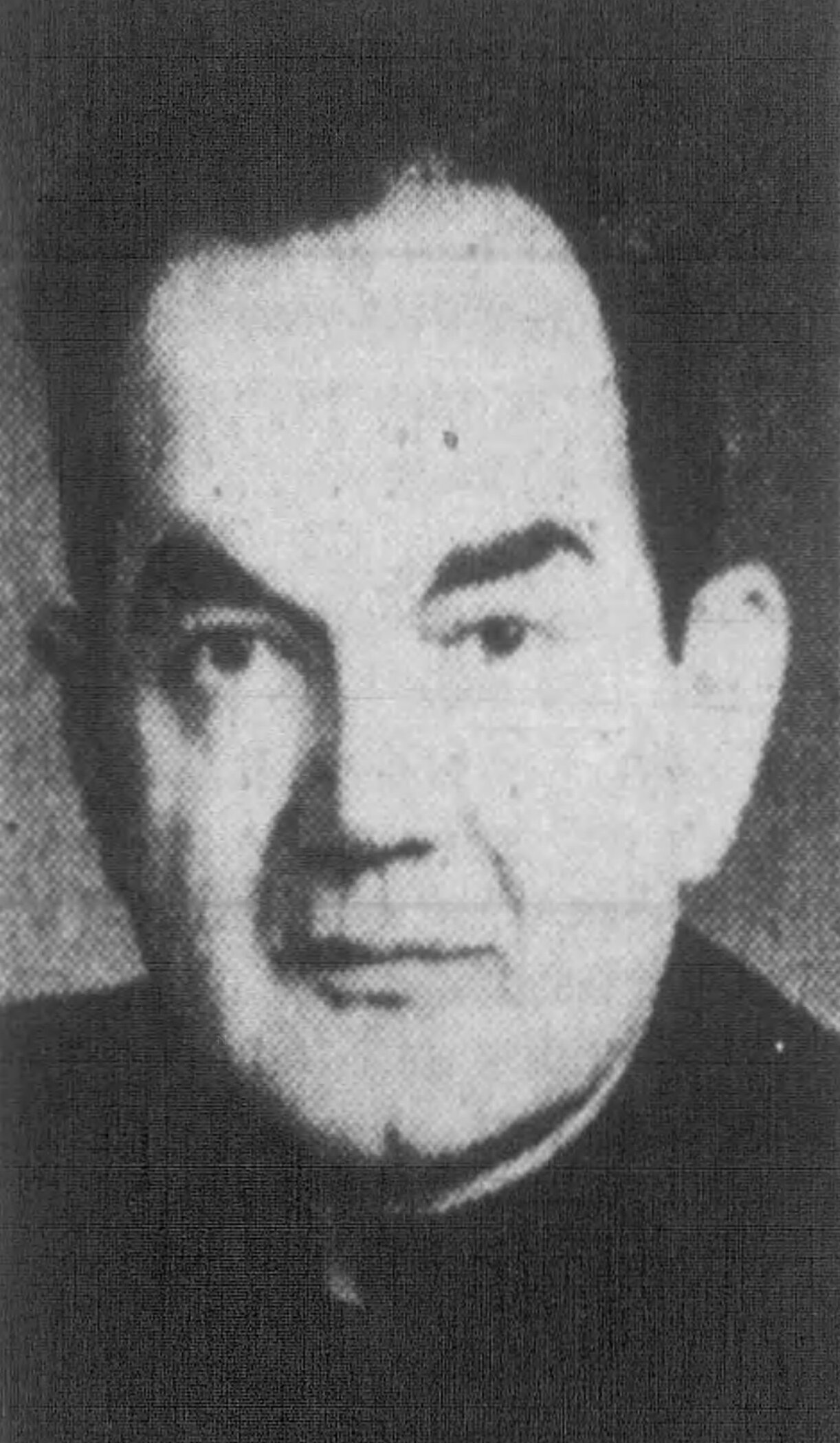
- McDonald in 1958
- Church: Catholic Church
- Appointed: March 17, 1964
- In office: July 26, 1967 - June 5, 1979
- Other post: Titular Bishop of Aquae Regiae
- Previous posts: Auxiliary Bishop of Washington (1964-1967); Rector, Catholic University of America (1957 to 1967)

Orders
- Ordination: June 10, 1928 by James J. Roche
- Consecration: May 19, 1964 by Egidio Vagnozzi

Personal details
- Born: June 17, 1904 Kilkenny, County Kilkenny, United Kingdom of Great Britain and Ireland
- Died: January 7, 1989 (aged 84) San Francisco, California, US
- Education: Catholic University of America
- Motto: In lumine Tuo (In Your light)

William Joseph McDonald (June 17, 1904 – January 7, 1989) was an Irish-born bishop of the Catholic Church in the United States. He served as an auxiliary bishop of the Archdiocese of Washington in the District of Columbia from 1964 to 1967 and the Archdiocese of San Francisco in California from 1967 to 1979. He also served as rector of Catholic University of America from 1957 to 1967.

== Biography ==
=== Early life ===
William McDonald was born on June 17, 1904, in Kilkenny in County Kilkenny, then part of the United Kingdom of Great Britain and Ireland. He trained for the priesthood in St Kieran's College in Kilkenny.

=== Priesthood ===
McDonald was ordained a priest for the Archdiocese of San Francisco at St. Mary's Cathedral in Kilkenny by Bishop James J. Roche on June 10, 1928. After arriving in California, the archdiocese assigned as an assistant pastors in parishes as well as an administrative worker. He also served as a chaplain at the Newman Center of Stanford University in Stanford, California as well as editor of the archdiocesan newspaper, The Monitor.

In 1936, the archdiocese sent McDonald to Washington, D.C. to study at Catholic University of America (CUA). He received a master's degree in philosophy in 1937 and a doctorate in 1938. CUA in 1940 appointed him as an instructor in their School of Philosophy. By 1950, McDonald had become a full professor. McDonald in 1952 inaugurated the first nationwide religious television show by any religious denomination. He was named vice rector of CUA in 1954. McDonald was named rector of CUA in 1957. During his tenure as rector, the university underwent a large building program and recorded a large increase in enrollments.

From 1960 to 1963, McDonald served as editor-in-chief of the New Catholic Encyclopedia, then as president of the International Federation of Catholic Universities.

=== Auxiliary Bishop of Washington ===
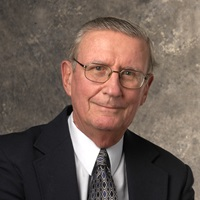
Reverend Curran (2017)

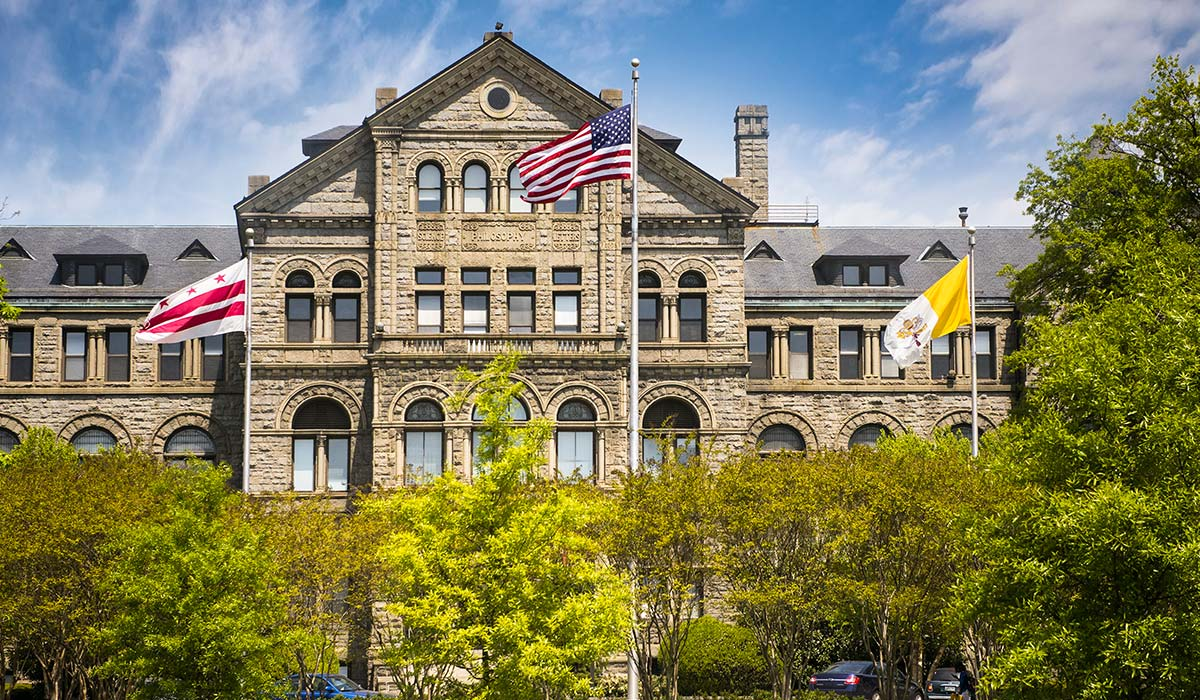
Catholic University of America, Washington, D.C. (2019)

On March 17, 1964, Pope Paul VI appointed McDonald as the titular bishop of Aquae Regiae and as an auxiliary bishop of Washington. He was consecrated a bishop by Archbishop Egidio Vagnozzi at the Shrine of the Immaculate Conception in Washington on May 19, 1964. His principal co-consecrators were Archbishops Patrick O'Boyle and Joseph McGucken. McDonald attended the third and fourth sessions of the Second Vatican Council in Rome in 1964 and 1965, serving as a peritus,

On April 17, 1967, McDonald informed Reverend Charles Curran, a theologian in the CUA School of Theology, that the CUA board of directors had voted to dismiss him. Curran had outraged conservative members of the board, including the powerful archbishop of Philadelphia, John Krol, with his liberal views on sexual ethics and artificial birth control.

Curran's dismissal was met with anger by the faculty and the student body. The faculty had been chafing on the restrictions of the university; it had previously called for the abolishment of the post of rector, to be replaced by a secular president. Within a few days, all of the schools at CUA had gone on strike. As the board reconsidered its decision, McDonald joined a group of board members that wanted to rehire Curran. On April 24, the board surrendered and Curran was rehired. When McDonald resigned from CUA a few months later, he was replaced by a president.

=== Auxiliary Bishop of San Francisco ===
Paul VI appointed McDonald on July 26, 1967, as an auxiliary bishop of San Francisco. At that time, McDonald resigned as rector of CUA.

=== Retirement and legacy ===
McDonald's resignation as auxiliary bishop of San Francisco was accepted by Pope John Paul II on June 5, 1979. He died of a heart attack in San Francisco on January 7, 1989, at age 84. He was interred at Holy Cross Catholic Cemetery in Colma, California.

Academic offices
Preceded by Bryan J. McEntegart	Rector of CUA; 1957–1967	Succeeded by Clarence C. Walton, Ph.D.
