= Master of Applied Ethics =

Professional master's degree in philosophy in China

A Master of Applied Ethics (Chinese: 应用伦理硕士) is the only professional master's degree in philosophy conferred by Chinese universities. This program aims to integrate traditional philosophical teachings with the pressing ethical issues emerging in the modern world. The degree is primarily structured to offer specialized knowledge in various sectors, and its curriculum incorporates interdisciplinary approaches to address ethical concerns in technology, life sciences, artificial intelligence, big data, and business.

== Overview ==
The Master of Applied Ethics program aims to train students to have an ethical theoretical foundation, combined with practical application skills in various professional fields. Graduates of this program are expected to possess the ability to discern ethical challenges, make moral judgments, and contribute to policy analysis and governance. The curriculum is designed to be interdisciplinary and is rooted in both traditional philosophical ethics and contemporary applied ethics.

== Concentrations ==
The Master of Applied Ethics program offers various concentrations, including:

=== Technology ethics ===
This concentration focuses on the ethical implications of emerging technologies and their integration into society. Students delve into topics like data privacy, surveillance, biotechnological advancements, and more.

=== Life-medical ethics ===
This concentration emphasizes the ethical challenges in biomedicine and healthcare. Topics explored may include genetic engineering, patient rights, medical experiments, and end-of-life decisions.

=== Artificial intelligence and big data ethics ===
This concentration responds to the national strategies for AI development and big data. Students in this track will gain proficiency in understanding the ethical frameworks related to AI and big data. They will also familiarize themselves with domestic and international policies, regulations, and standards regarding the ethical governance of AI and big data. Specialized courses for this concentration include "Ethics, Governance, and Compliance of Artificial Intelligence," "Data Ethics, Law, and Public Policy," and "Algorithm and Ethics Specialized Research."

=== Corporate governance ethics ===
This track focuses on the development and innovation of business in the age of globalization. Graduates will be trained to combine product and service innovations with corporate social responsibility. Courses in this concentration include "Introduction to Business Ethics," "Organizational Ethics in the 21st Century: ESG Special Topic," and "Business Ethical Decision-making."

== Admissions ==
Each concentration has specific targeted audiences. For instance, the AI and Big Data Ethics track targets professionals involved in AI product development, design, and management, while the Business Ethics concentration aims at professionals in management, education, and research.
