= LeRoy Walters =

American philosopher (born 1940)

- Born: 1940 (age 85–86)

Education
- Education: Yale University (PhD)

Philosophical work
- Era: 21st-century philosophy
- Region: Western philosophy
- Institutions: Georgetown University
- Main interests: Christian ethics, bioethics

LeRoy Walters (born 1940) is an American philosopher and Joseph P. Kennedy, Sr. Professor Emeritus of Christian Ethics at Georgetown University. He is known for his works on bioethics, Christian ethics, Holocaust studies and the life of Dietrich Bonhoeffer.

== Early life and education ==
Walters was born in Sterling, Illinois in 1940. He was raised in a Mennonite community in Pennsylvania and earned a bachelor's degree from Messiah College in 1962. He received a bachelor of divinity degree from the Associated Mennonite Seminaries in 1965. He travelled in Europe afterwards, studying for one year at Heidelberg University and for one year at the Free University of Berlin. After returning to the United States in 1967, Walters began a PhD program at Yale University. He completed his PhD in Religious Studies at Yale University Graduate School in 1971.

== Academic career ==
In 1971, Walters was senior research scholar at the Kennedy Institute of Ethics at Georgetown University. He curated the Bibliography of Bioethics and Encyclopedia of Bioethics, and founded the Bioethics Research Library. He served as director of the Bioethics Center from 1971 until 1993, and director of the Kennedy Institute of Ethics from 1996 until 2000. Walters played an important role in the development of bioethics as new forms of gene therapy and biotechnologies were developed in the 1970s. His research and role as an advisor to policy makers and academic bodies helped to position the Kennedy Institute as one of the primary bioethics organizations of the time. He was chair of the Recombinant DNA Advisory Committee of the National Institutes of Health from 1993 until 1996, and served on the committee for three terms.

Walters became assistant professor of philosophy at Georgetown in 1975, associate professor in 1990, and full professor in 1993. He was also named Joseph P. Kennedy, Sr. Professor Emeritus of Christian Ethics in 1993. He has researched Holocaust studies, especially the euthanasia of disabled people in Nazi Germany, and has researched the life of Dietrich Bonhoeffer, prominent opponent of Nazi eugenics and euthanasia policies.

== Personal life ==
Walters was married to Jane Martin Walters until her death in 1988. In 1990, he married Sue Meinke Walters. He has two sons.

== Books ==
- The Ethics of Human Gene Therapy, with Julie Gage Palmer, Oxford University Press, 1997.
- Contemporary Issues in Bioethics, co-editor (with Tom L. Beauchamp, Jeffrey P. Kahn, and Anna C. Mastroianni, 7th ed., Wadsworth, 2008.
