= Reza Sepahvand =

Iranian physicist and politician

- رضا سپهوند
- Scientific career
- Fields: Physics
- Institutions: Lorestan University

Reza Sepahvand is an Iranian physicist, politician and Professor of Physics at Lorestan University. He is a member of the 12th Islamic Consultative Assembly from Khorramabad.
