= Tom Beauchamp =

American philosopher (1939–2025)

- Born: Tom Lamar Beauchamp III; December 2, 1939
- Died: February 19, 2025 (aged 85)
- Education: BA, MA (1963); Southern Methodist University; BD (1966); Yale Divinity School; PhD (1970, in philosophy); Johns Hopkins University
- Occupation: Philosopher
- Employer: Georgetown University
- Website: Homepage; Georgetown University; Homepage; Kennedy Institute of Ethics

Tom Lamar Beauchamp III (December 2, 1939 – February 19, 2025) was an American philosopher. He specialized in the work of David Hume, moral philosophy, bioethics, and animal ethics. Beauchamp was Professor Emeritus of Philosophy at Georgetown University, where he was Senior Research Scholar at the Kennedy Institute of Ethics.

Beauchamp authored or co-authored several books on ethics and on Hume, including Hume and the Problem of Causation (1981, with Alexander Rosenberg), Principles of Biomedical Ethics (1985, with James F. Childress), and The Human Use of Animals (1998, with F. Barbara Orlans et al). He was the co-editor with R. G. Frey of The Oxford Handbook of Animal Ethics (2011). He was also the co-editor of the complete works of Hume, The Critical Edition of the Works of David Hume (1999), published by Oxford University Press.

== Education ==
Beauchamp earned a BA from Southern Methodist University in 1963, a BD from Yale Divinity School, and PhD in philosophy from Johns Hopkins University in 1970. He was a fellow of the Hastings Center.

== Career ==
Beauchamp worked on the staff of the National Commission for the Protection of Human Subjects of Biomedical and Behavioral Research, where he co-wrote the Belmont Report in 1978. He subsequently joined with James Childress to write Principles of Biomedical Ethics (1979), the first major American bioethics textbook. Beauchamp was also an expert on the philosophy of David Hume. He was the coeditor of the complete works of Hume published by Oxford University Press, and together with Alexander Rosenberg was the author of Hume and the Problem of Causation (1981), in which Hume's regularity theory of causation is defended, along with a nonskeptical interpretation of Hume's arguments against induction.

He also wrote extensively about animal rights, and defended a theory of animal rights which would significantly alter, though would not end, the ways in which non-human animals are currently used.

Beauchamp retired in 2016. A ceremony celebrating his career featured tributes from Maggie Little, Bill Blattner, Jeffrey Kahn, James Childress, Alexander Rosenberg, Patricia King, David DeGrazia, Wayne Davis, Jack DeGioia, and his children.

Arthur Caplan, a professor of bioethics at the New York University Grossman School of Medicine, called Beauchamp "a key figure in the foundation of the entire field of bioethics.”

== Death ==
Beauchamp died on February 19, 2025, at the age of 85. He was buried at Abel's Hill Cemetery, in Chilmark, Massachusetts, on February 24.

== See also ==
- American philosophy
- List of American philosophers
- List of animal rights advocates
- Principlism
