= Bernard Gert =

American moral philosopher (1934–2011)

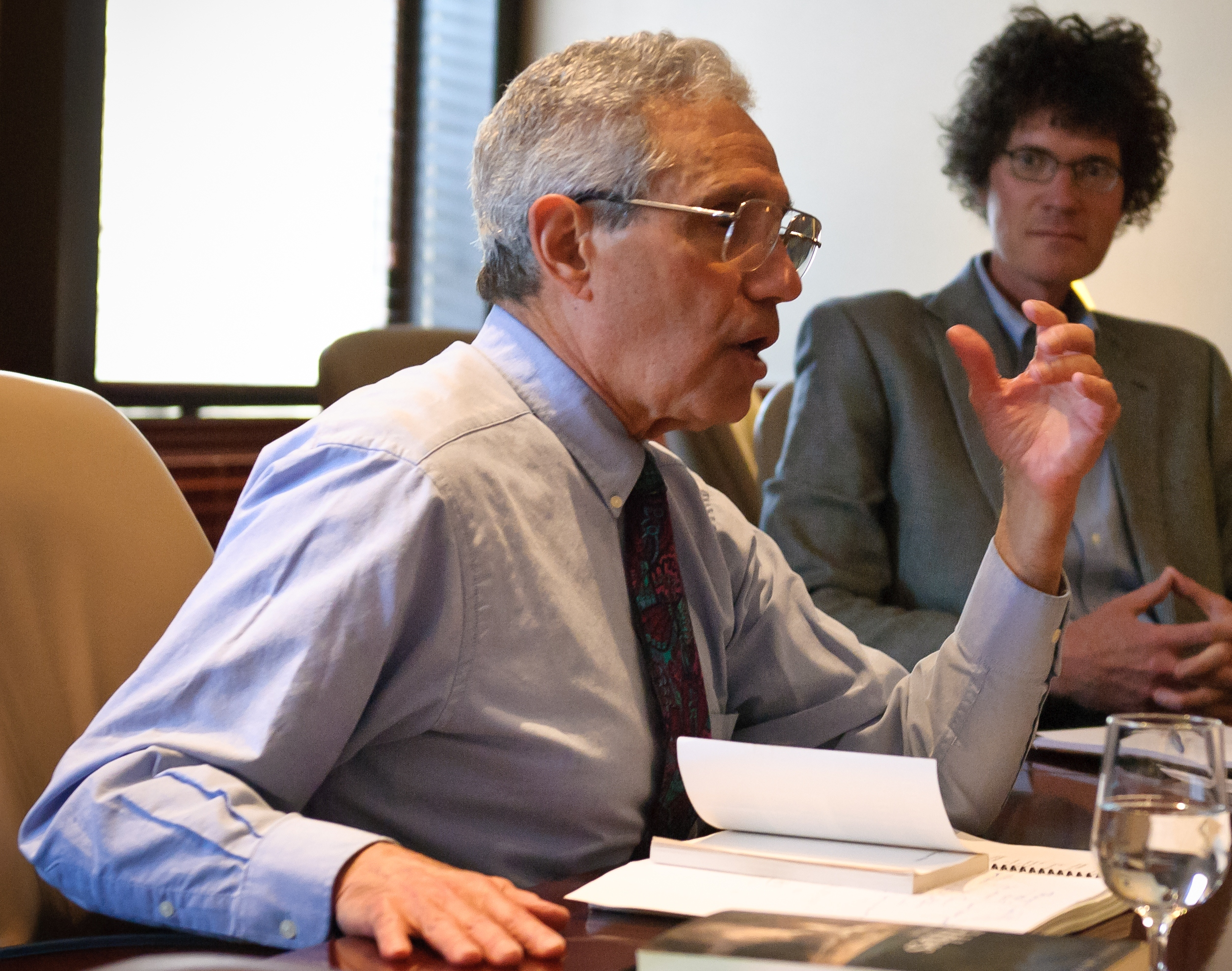
- Born: 16 October 1934; Cincinnati, Ohio
- Died: 24 December 2011 (aged 77); Chapel Hill, North Carolina

Philosophical work
- Era: 20th-century philosophy
- Region: Western philosophy
- School: Analytic
- Main interests: Normative ethics, metaethics, bioethics, Thomas Hobbes
- Notable ideas: Ten moral rules

Bernard Gert (/ɡɜːrt/; October 16, 1934 – December 24, 2011) was a moral philosopher known primarily for his work in normative ethics, as well as in medical ethics, especially pertaining to psychology.

His work has been called "among the clearest and most comprehensive on the contemporary scene", "far more detailed and more concretely worked out" and "systematic" than competing comprehensive ethical theories. Because it avoids pitfalls associated with other dominant ethical theoretical approaches (such as deontology, utilitarianism, contractarianism, and virtue ethics), Gert's moral theory "provides what many people are looking for".

== Life ==
Born in Cincinnati, Ohio, Gert studied philosophy at Cornell University. He was a professor at Dartmouth College for fifty years, from 1959 to 2009. At the time of his death in 2011, he was the Stone Professor of Intellectual and Moral Philosophy, emeritus at Dartmouth. He also had other adjunct and visiting appointments, including the University of Edinburgh 1974-5 and being a fellow of the Hastings Center, an independent bioethics research institution. He died in 2011 in North Carolina.

A source of notoriety among his contemporaries was that his family became a family of philosophers: his two children, Joshua and Heather, both became philosophers, and both married two other philosophers.

== Metaethics ==
=== Definition of morality ===
Gert advocates the following definition of morality:

Morality is an informal public system applying to all rational persons, governing behavior that affects others, and includes what are commonly known as the moral rules, ideals, and virtues and has the lessening of evil or harm as its goal.

=== Morality as known to all ===
According to Gert, his theory counts as a natural law theory because he holds that all moral agents must be able to understand morality in order to count as moral agents. In other words, "moral judgments can only be made about those who know what kind of behavior morality prohibits, requires, discourages, encourages, and allows."

=== Harm as the central moral concept ===
According to Gert, harm (or "evil") is the central moral concept. Gert believes harm is what all rational creatures seek to avoid. He advances the following five-concept account of harm:

- death
- pain
- disability
- loss of freedom
- loss of pleasure.

He maintains that commonsense morality is far more concerned with prohibiting (and discouraging) evil than with requiring (or encouraging) people to enhance goods or benefits.

=== Rationality and impartiality ===
On Gert's view, the bases for morality are rationality and impartiality.

On Gert's conception of rationality, it is irrational to fail to be averse to harm. Everyone avoids harm insofar as they are rational. Rationality does require that we avoid harming ourselves without an adequate reason. A rational person would not cause his own pain unless it were for an adequate reason, for example, to cure a disease. Even a masochist causes pain in himself for a reason, presumably for pleasure. This helps show that no rational being seeks to harm himself for its own sake.

The sort of adequate reason in question involves avoiding any of the five basic evils or obtaining of any of the following basic goods:

- pleasure
- freedom
- ability
- consciousness

According to Gert, acting rationally does not always require acting morally. For example, it is not irrational to set a trap for someone who is wearing an Armani suit so that they fall into a swimming pool in front of a video camera, since the pleasure one can get out of watching the video constitutes an adequate reason for harming the other person. It would also be rational for a sadist to torture other people for fun provided the sadist could get away with it.

There are five sorts of irrational desire according to Gert: seeking death, pain, disability, loss of freedom, or loss of pleasure. We arrive at moral rules by extending these objects of irrational desire to others. Rationality, alone, does not require this. However, if we adopt the principle of impartiality, whereby we apply the rules without regard to who gains or loses, we extend these prohibitions to others. This results in rules such as do not kill, do not cause pain, do not disable, and so forth.

=== Why be moral? ===
On Gert's view, there are several reasons to act morally. The primary one is i) that if you don't, someone else will be harmed. While it is rational not to care about others, the fact that they will be harmed is enough of a reason itself.

Other reasons to act morally include ii) that acting immorally will corrupt one's own character, and iii) that some forms of immoral action can make the world inhospitable to oneself, such that in some cases it is irrational to act immorally toward others.

== Normative ethics ==
=== Ten moral rules ===
In his book Common Morality: Deciding What to Do, Gert proposes ten moral rules which, if followed, create a moral system. The rules are as follows:

1. Do not kill
2. Do not cause pain
3. Do not disable
4. Do not deprive of freedom
5. Do not deprive of pleasure
6. Do not deceive
7. Keep your promises
8. Do not cheat
9. Obey the law
10. Do your duty

The first five of these rules directly prohibit harming other people. Thus, they can be summarized with the slogan, 'do not harm'. The second five rules get their force from the fact that if it were generally allowed that those rules be broken, many harms (and losses of benefits) would result. They can be summarized with the slogan, 'do not violate trust'.

=== Exceptions to the rules: the two-step procedure ===
Gert holds that the moral rules are not absolute, but admit of exceptions. To determine whether a moral rule applies in a certain case or whether there is an exception, Gert advises people to follow what he calls the "two step procedure." The first step is to ascertain all morally relevant information about the scenario at hand in order to make a justified evaluation. The second step is to consider the consequences of other people knowing that they can violate the moral rule in similar circumstances.

An example would be if you were to consider violating rule #9 (breaking the law) in order to run a red light. You evaluate the scenario and notice that there are no cars around, so running the red light will not cause any harm. However, you do not want other people to know that they can run red lights, too, because that would lead to more car accidents, resulting in more pain and death. Conversely, an acceptable example of violating the moral rules would be killing in self-defense. If you evaluate the situation, you find that if you do not kill the other person, they will violate one of the moral rules and kill you. Also, it would not be problematic for other people to know that killing in self-defense is allowable.

=== Moral ideals ===
Moral ideals, according to Gert, are objectives to lessen the amount of harm or evil in the world. These differ from moral rules, which are requirements that people avoid performing certain kinds of actions which produce harms to others. Morality encourages, but does not require, people to live up to moral ideals. Examples of moral ideals are the objectives of reducing the incidence of domestic violence or of breast cancer.

What Gert calls utilitarian ideals are objectives to increase the amount of good in the world. For example, the objective of giving poor children extra presents for Christmas.

== Categorizing Gert's moral theory ==
Although his moral system shares similarities to deontology, rule utilitarianism, and contractarianism, Gert does not ally himself with any of those positions. He writes, "I think that my view is best characterized as a natural law theory . . . in the tradition of Hobbes". He also writes, "my view has been characterized as Kant with consequences, as Mill with publicity, and as Ross with a theory."

However, when Walter Sinnott-Armstrong once labeled the theory as "a sophisticated form of negative objective universal public rule consequentialism", Gert replied that "there may be no point in denying that I am some form of consequentialist".

== Bibliography ==
- The Morality Monographs
  - The Moral Rules: A New Rational Foundation for Morality, Harper and Row, 1970.
  - Morality: A New Justification of the Moral Rules, Oxford University Press, 1988.
  - Morality: Its Nature and Justification, Oxford University Press, 1998.
  - Morality: Its Nature and Justification, Revised Edition, Oxford University Press, 2005.
- Common Morality: Deciding What to Do, Oxford University Press, 2004.
- Bioethics: A Systematic Approach, 2nd Edition, Oxford University Press, 2006
- Hobbes: Prince of Peace, Polity Press, 2010.
