= Department of Philosophy (New York University) =

Division of New York University

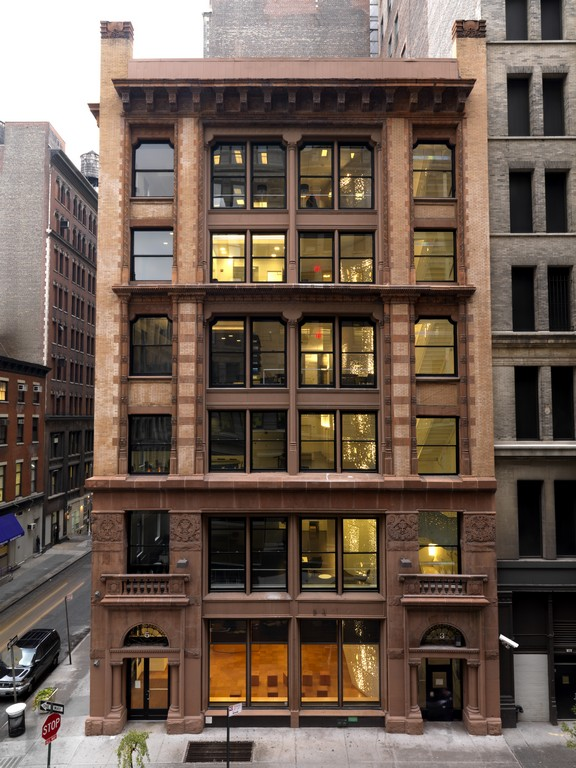
- Established: 1832
- Parent institution: New York University Arts and Science (College and Graduate School)
- Chairperson: Sharon Street
- Location: 5 Washington Pl, New York City, New York, 10003, United States
- Website: as.nyu.edu/philosophy

The Department of Philosophy is an academic department at the College and the Graduate School of Arts and Science at New York University in New York City, New York, United States.

The department, through the College and the Graduate School, offers B.A. and Ph.D. degrees in philosophy, as well as a minor in philosophy and a joint major in language and mind with the NYU Departments of Linguistics and Psychology. It is home to the New York Institute of Philosophy, a research center that supports multi-year projects, public lectures, conferences, and workshops in the field, as well as outreach programs to teach New York City high school students interested in philosophy.

The faculty and students have close relations with the philosophy department of Columbia University. Every year, NYU and Columbia philosophy graduate students organize the Annual NYU/Columbia Graduate Student Philosophy Conference. Furthermore, doctoral students are able to cross-register to take courses at Columbia University, as well as at the other members of the Inter-University Doctoral Consortium (IUDC): Princeton University, CUNY Graduate Center, Rutgers University, Fordham University, Stony Brook University, and The New School. Within NYU, the department works especially closely with the School of Law, whose Center for Law and Philosophy hosts the Colloquium in Legal, Political, and Social Philosophy on a weekly basis during the fall semester of each academic year. Many former and current faculty members of the department have held or currently hold dual appointments in both philosophy and law, including Ronald Dworkin, Thomas Nagel, Liam Murphy, Samuel Scheffler, Jeremy Waldron, and Kwame Anthony Appiah. Other research centers affiliated with the department are the Center for Bioethics and the Center for Mind, Brain, and Consciousness.

The department is housed in 5 Washington Place, a historic building within the jurisdiction of the New York City Landmarks Preservation Commission near the border between the neighborhoods of NoHo and Greenwich Village. The interior of the building was completely renovated in 2007 by Steven Holl Architects, featuring design elements inspired by the writings of philosopher Ludwig Wittgenstein, namely his Remarks on Colour.

== Gallery of prominent faculty ==
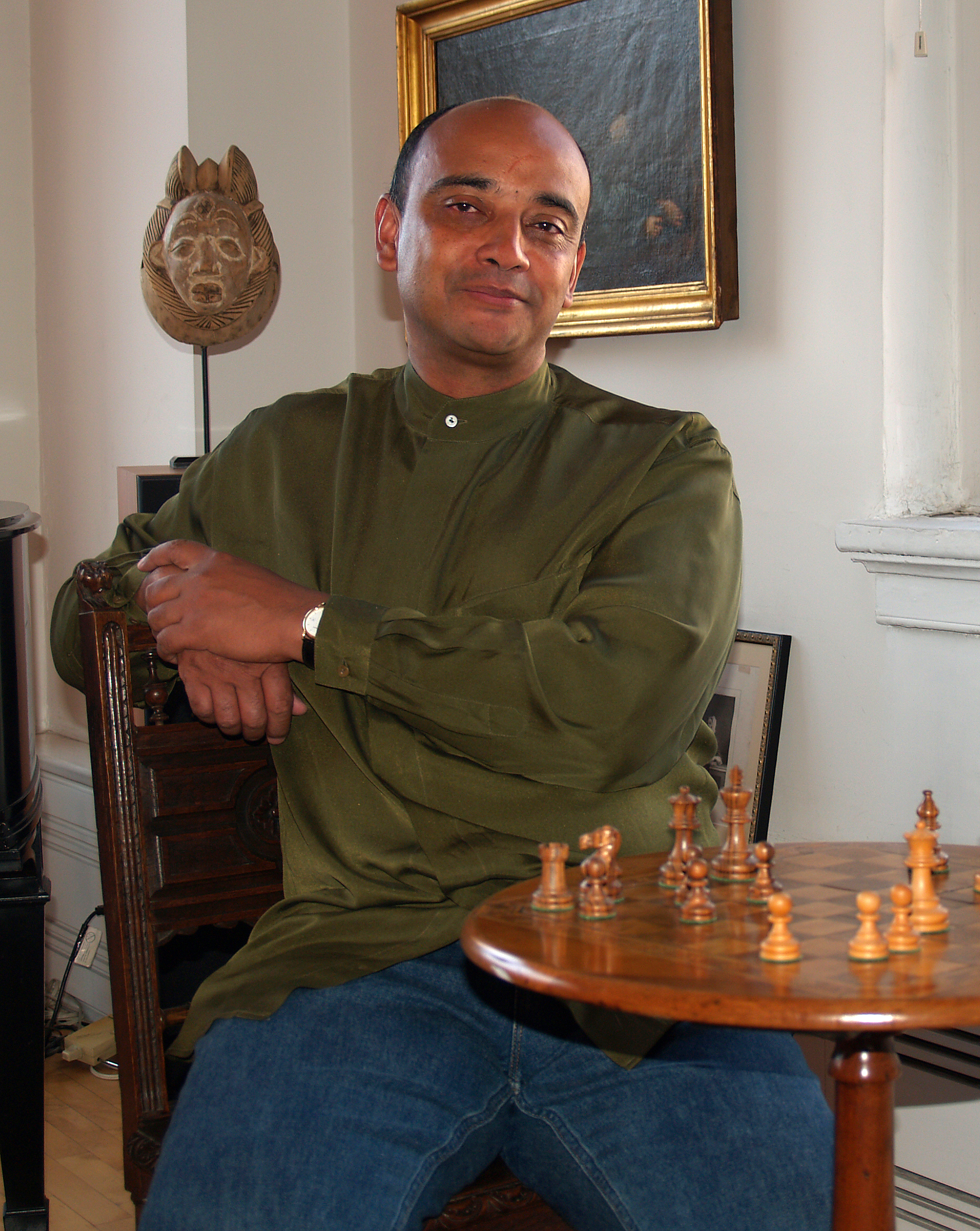
Anthony Appiah (2014-)

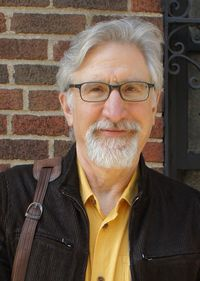
Ned Block (1996-)

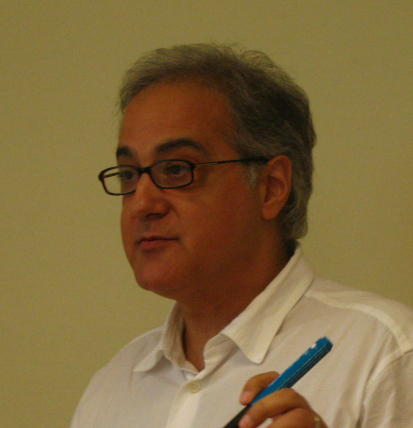
Paul Boghossian (1992-)

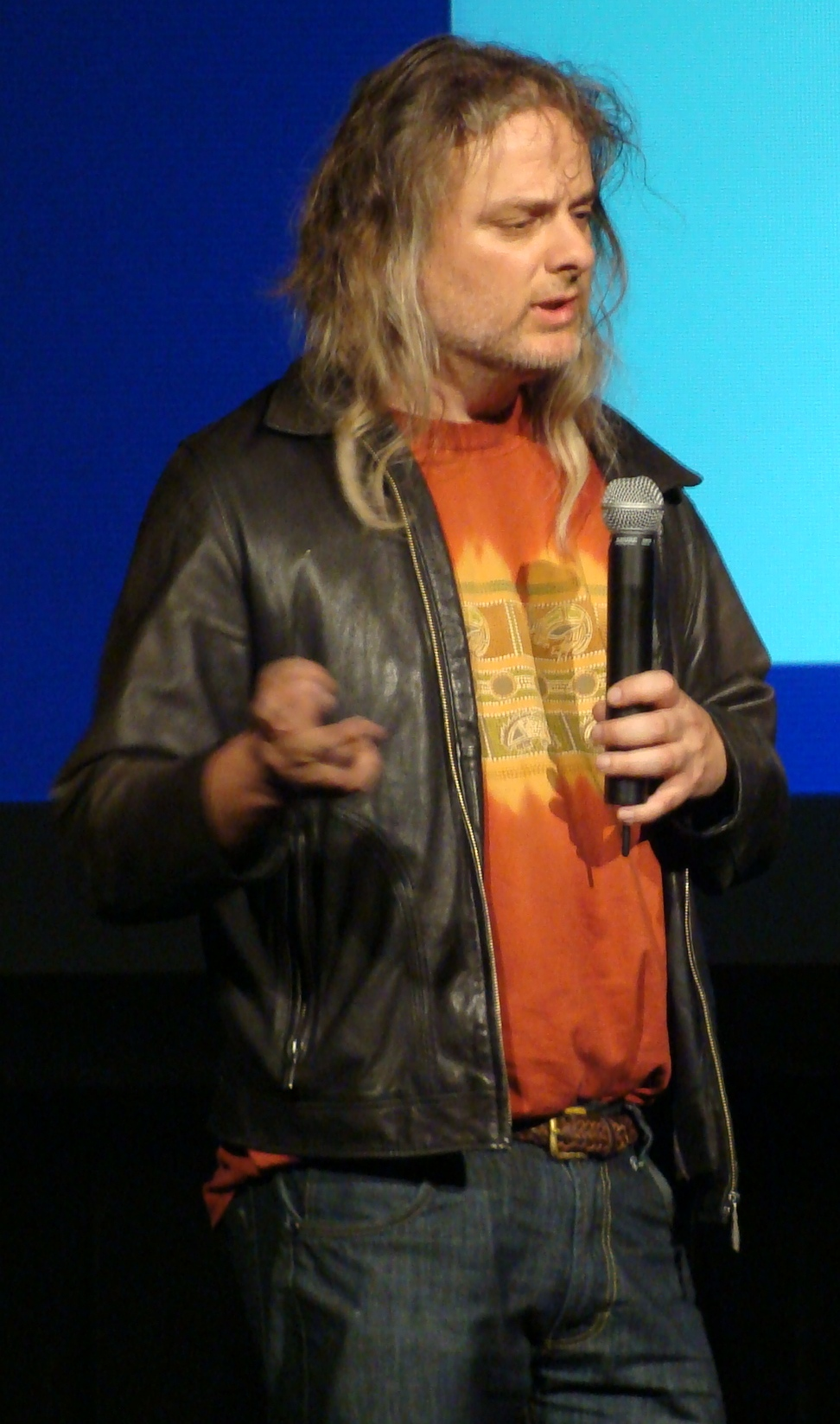
David Chalmers (2009-)

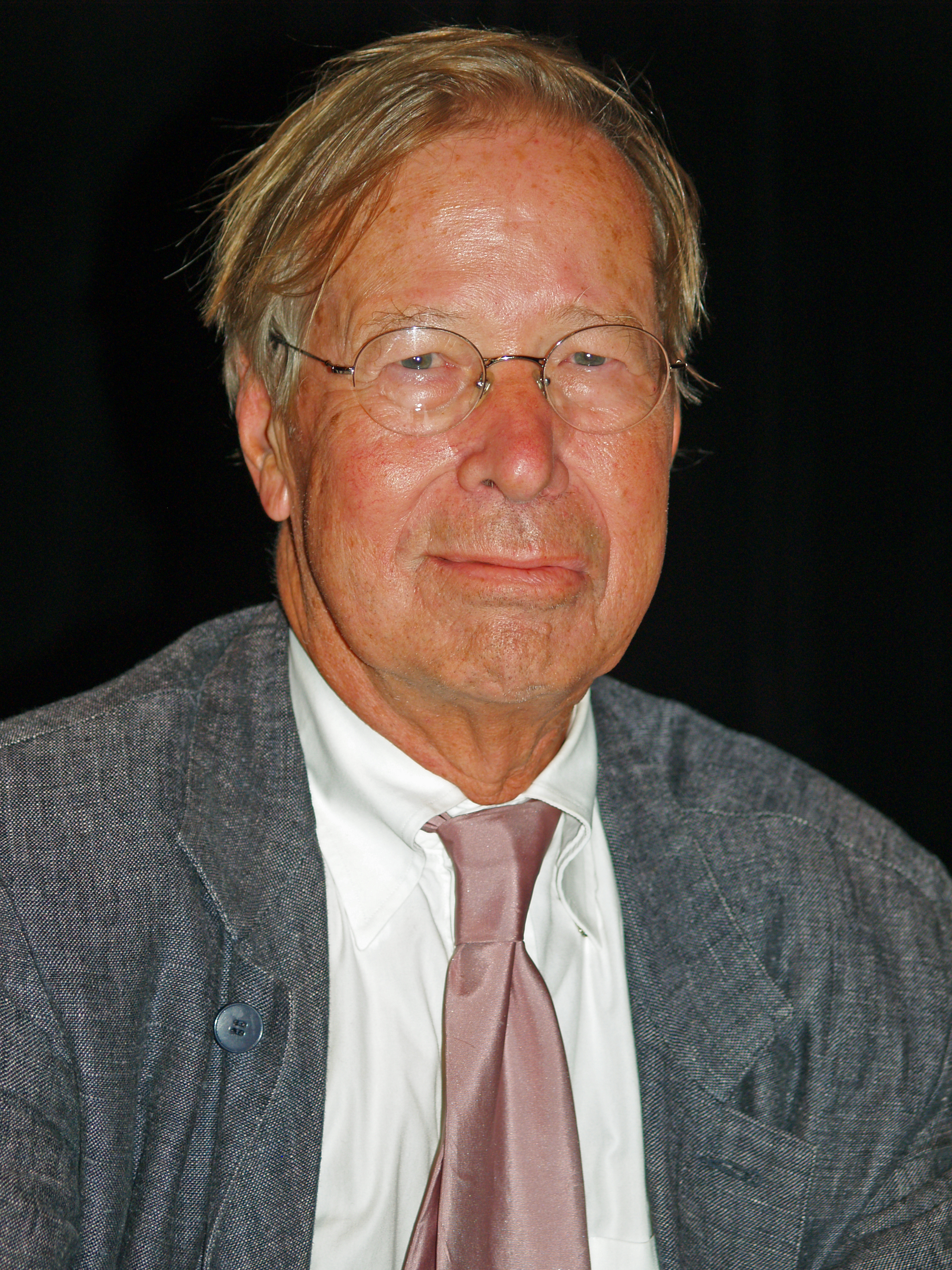
Ronald Dworkin (1975–2013)

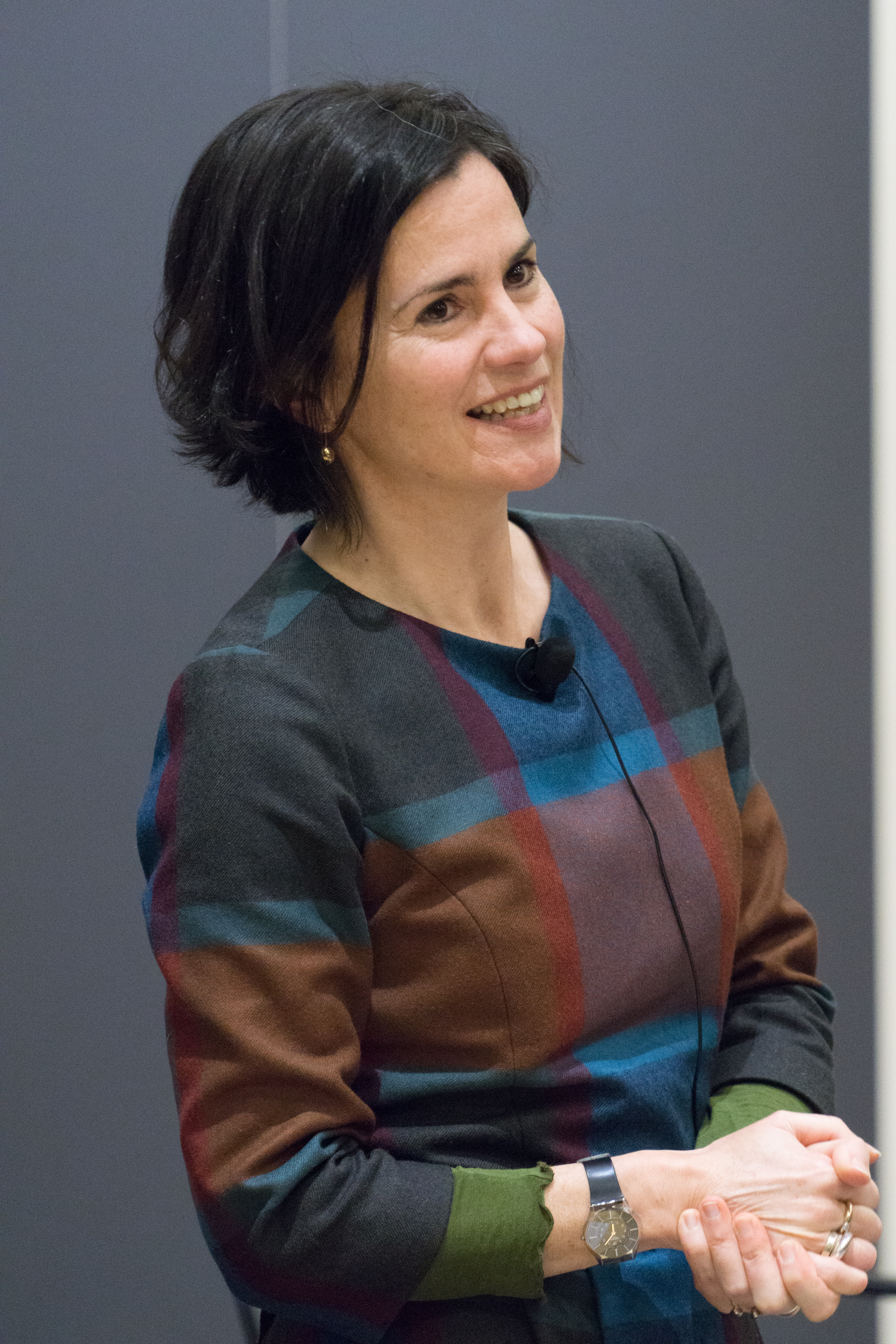
Miranda Fricker (2022-)

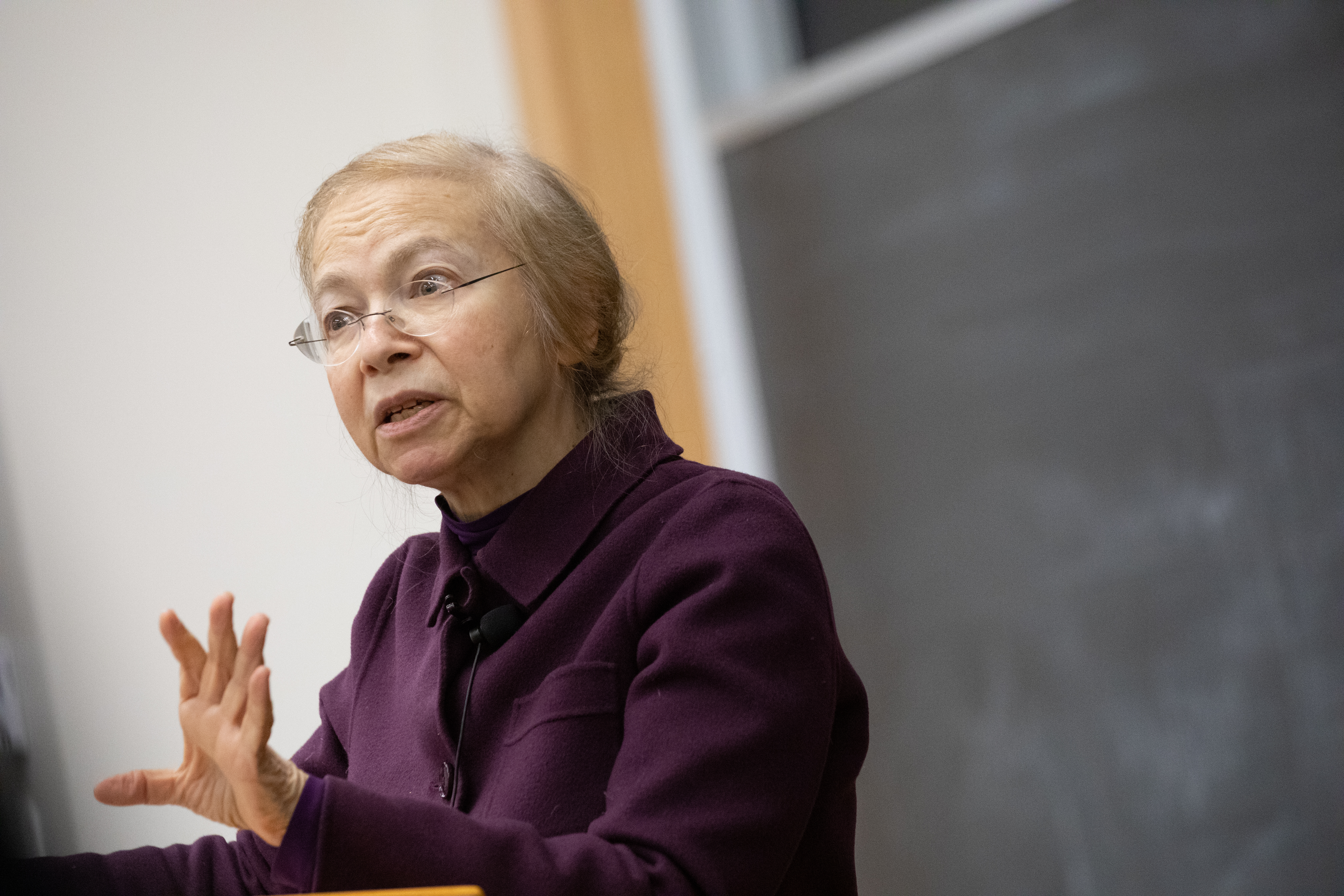
Frances Kamm (1980s-2003, Emeritus)

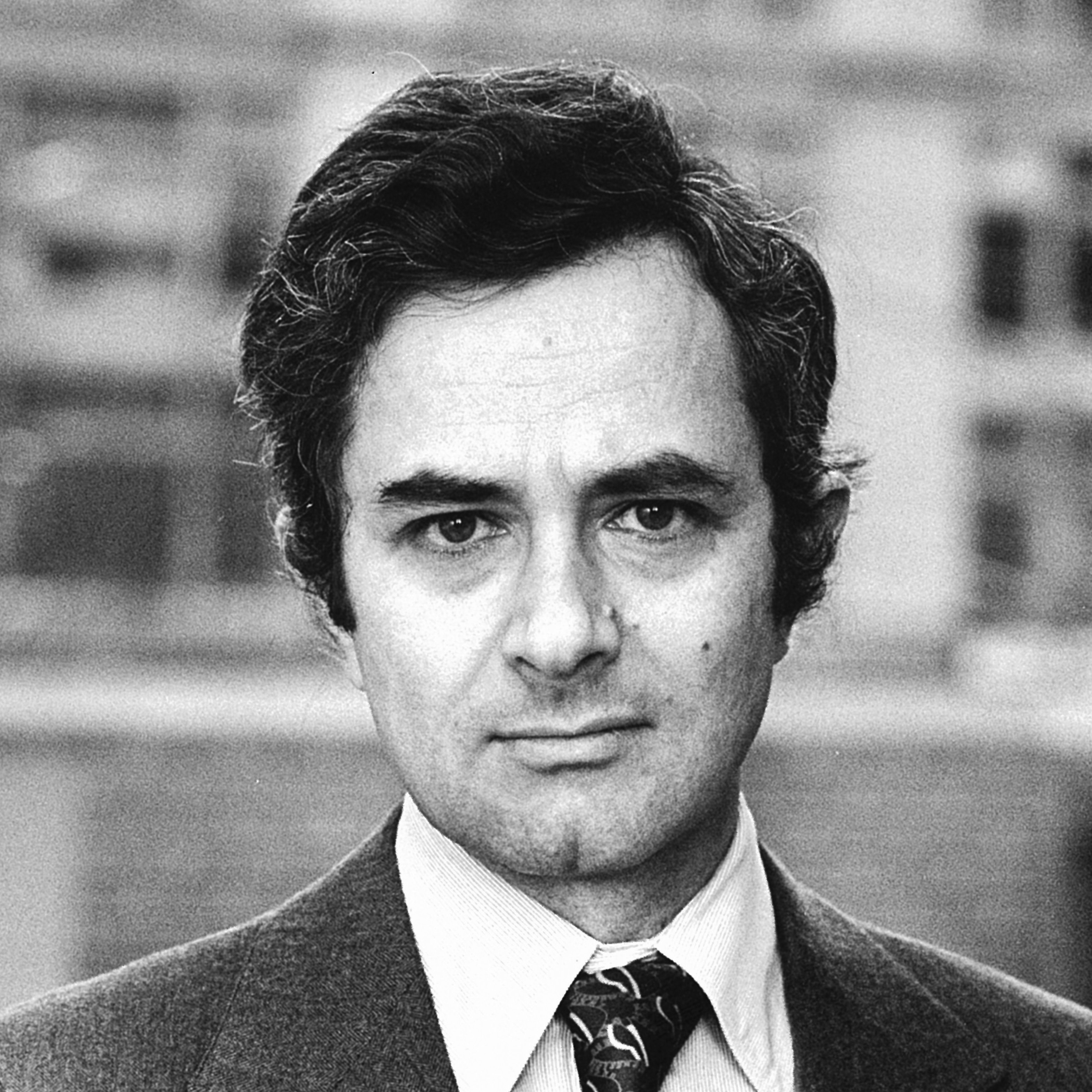
Thomas Nagel (1980–2016, Emeritus)

== Current faculty ==
This list includes all regular and affiliated faculty.

- Kwame Anthony Appiah, ethics, political philosophy, philosophy of mind, philosophy of race, probability and decision theory
- Jonathan Bain, philosophy of physics
- Juliana Bidananure, political and legal philosophy, philosophy of public policy, ethics
- Ned Block, philosophy of mind, philosophy of neuroscience and cognitive science
- Paul Boghossian, philosophy of mind, philosophy of language, epistemology
- David Chalmers, philosophy of mind, philosophy of language, metaphysics, epistemology, philosophy of technology
- Sanford Diehl, ethics, social and political philosophy
- Cian Dorr, metaphysics, epistemology, philosophy of language, philosophy of physics
- Hent de Vries, metaphysics, philosophy of religion
- Hartry Field, metaphysics, epistemology, philosophy of logic, philosophy of mathematics
- Kit Fine, logic, metaphysics, philosophy of language
- Daniel Fogal, ethics, bioethics, epistemology, philosophy of language
- Laura Franklin-Hall, philosophy of biology
- Miranda Fricker, moral philosophy, social epistemology
- Jane Friedman, epistemology
- Don Garrett, early modern philosophy
- Robert David Hopkins, aesthetics, philosophy of mind
- Paul Horwich, philosophy of language, metaphysics, Wittgenstein, philosophy of science
- Dale Jamieson, environmental ethics
- Anja Jauernig, Kant, early modern philosophy, 19th and early 20th century German philosophy, history of philosophy of science, aesthetics, and animal ethics
- Marko Malink, ancient philosophy, philosophical logic
- Matthew Mandelkern, philosophy of language, semantics, philosophy of cognitive science
- S. Matthew Liao, bioethics
- Tim Maudlin, foundations of physics, metaphysics, logic, philosophy of science
- Philip Mitsis, ancient philosophy
- Sophia Moreau, moral philosophy, legal philosophy, political philosophy
- Jessica Moss, ancient philosophy
- Liam Murphy, legal philosophy, moral and political philosophy
- Claudia Passos-Ferreira, philosophy of mind, moral psychology, ethics, bioethics
- John Richardson, Heidegger, Nietzsche, ancient philosophy
- Samuel Scheffler, moral and political philosophy
- Jeff Sebo, bioethics, animal ethics, and environmental ethics
- Sharon Street, ethics
- Tamson Shaw, political philosophy, history of political thought, Nietzsche
- Michael Strevens, philosophy of science, concepts, philosophical applications of cognitive science
- Peter Unger, metaphysics, epistemology, philosophy of mind, ethics
- Jeremy Waldron, philosophy of law, social and political philosophy
- James Walsh, logic
- Jerome C. Wakefield, conceptual foundations of clinical theory, philosophy of psychopathology, psychiatric epidemiology of depression, integrative clinical theory, Freud studies

== Emeritus faculty ==
- Richard Foley, epistemology
- Frances Kamm, ethics
- Béatrice Longuenesse, Kant, Hegel, modern philosophy, philosophy of mind
- Thomas Nagel, philosophy of mind, philosophy of law, political philosophy, ethics
- William Ruddick, philosophy of science and medicine, professional and applied ethics, bioethics
- Stephen Schiffer, philosophy of language, philosophy of mind, metaphysics, epistemology
- J. David Velleman, ethics, moral psychology

== Notable former faculty ==
- Raziel Abelson, ethics and ordinary language philosophy
- Margaret Athelton, early modern period philosophy, philosophy of psychology, feminist philosophy
- William Barrett, existentialist philosophy
- James Burnham, political philosophy
- Keith DeRose, epistemology, philosophy of language, philosophy of religion, and history of modern philosophy
- Ronald Dworkin, philosophy of law
- Paul Edwards, ethics
- Sidney Hook, philosophy of history, philosophy of education, political philosophy, ethics
- Michael Lockwood, philosophy of mind
- Ferdinand Lundberg, social philosophy
- Kai Nielson, metaphilosophy, ethics, social and political philosophy
- Christopher Peacocke, philosophy of mind, epistemology
- James Pryor, epistemology, philosophy of language
- Theodore Sider, metaphysics and philosophy of language

== Notable former visiting scholars ==
- Moshe Halbertal, Maimonides, ethics, philosophy of religion
- Derek Parfit, identity, philosophy of logic, ethics
- Peter Singer, applied ethics

== Notable alumni ==
- Ruth Barcan Marcus, philosopher and logician known for the Barcan formula
- Brent Barraclough, classical pianist
- Stanley Bosworth, founding headmaster of Saint Ann's School
- Peter Daou, political strategist and advisor to Hillary Clinton and John Kerry
- David Enoch, philosopher
- Richard Gambino, professor and pioneer of the field of Italian-American studies
- Lewis Frumkes, humorist and writer
- Sandra Harding, philosopher of feminist and postcolonial theory
- Paul Kurtz, philosopher and father of secular humanism
- Tibor Machan, libertarian philosopher
- Walter Ralston Martin, Christian minister and apologist
- Leonard Peikoff, objectivist philosopher and intellectual heir to Ayn Rand
- Shimon Peres, former president and two time prime minister of Israel
- William Reeves, co-founder of BlueCrest Capital Management
- Tim Rollins, artist
- Isaac Rosenfeld, writer
- Harold M. Schulweis, rabbi and theologian
- Jeff Sebo, philosopher
- David Sidorsky, philosopher
- Harold Spivake, former Chief of the Music Division of the Library of Congress
- Stephen Yagman, federal lawyer

== Other philosophers affiliated with NYU ==
The following people are notable philosophers not affiliated with the Department of Philosophy who currently hold or have held faculty positions within other departments at New York University

- Jacques Derrida
- Avital Ronell
- Slavoj Žižek

== Student organizations ==
At the graduate level, students can participate in the NYU chapter of Minorities and Philosophy (MAP), an international organization consisting of philosophy students committed to addressing minority issues in the profession, theoretical issues regarding philosophy of gender, race, sexual orientation, class, disability, native language, etc., and philosophy done from minority perspectives. The MAP chapter at NYU pursues these goals through a variety of events, including talks, film screenings, workshops, trainings, and collaborative events organized with other NYC-area chapters.

At the undergraduate level, students can participate in the NYU Philosophy Forum, which hosts talks and panels with faculty members, postdoctoral fellows, and graduate students throughout the academic year. In addition, the Philosophy Forum organizes the Annual Undergraduate Philosophy Conference @ NYU. The conference is held at the end of the spring semester of each academic year, is open to the public, and generally features undergraduate students selected from various universities giving presentations of their original work on any philosophical topic, panels on philosophical topics of interest, as well as lectures by notable philosophers who are invited from both the faculty at NYU and other institutions. Past keynote lecturers for the conference include Thomas Nagel, David Chalmers, and Saul Kripke, with other notable speakers and panelists including Kwame Anthony Appiah, Ned Block, Paul Boghossian, S. Matthew Liao, Michele Moody-Adams, Sharon Street, and Paul Thagard.

== Rankings ==
The latest edition of the Philosophical Gourmet Report from 2024–25 ranks the department as 1st in the US and 1st in the English speaking world. The 2024 QS World University Rankings list the department as ranked 1st globally.
