= Paul Boghossian =

American philosopher (born 1957)

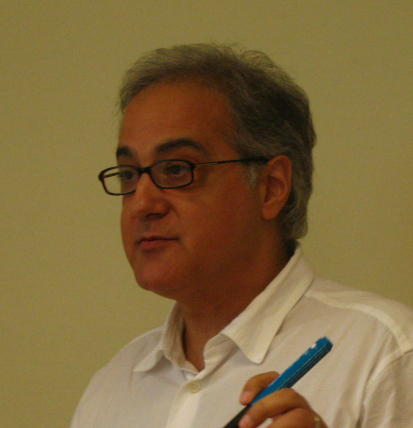
- Boghossian in 2008
- Born: Paul Artin Boghossian; 4 June 1957 (age 69); Haifa, Israel

Education
- Education: Trent University (BSc, 1976); Princeton University (PhD, 1987)
- Thesis: Essays on Meaning and Belief (1987)
- Doctoral advisor: Paul Benacerraf

Philosophical work
- Era: Contemporary philosophy
- Region: Western philosophy
- School: Analytic
- Institutions: New York University
- Main interests: Epistemology, philosophy of mind, philosophy of language
- Notable ideas: Epistemic analyticity; A priori justification; Criticism of epistemic relativism

Paul Artin Boghossian (/bəˈɡoʊziən/; born June 4, 1957) is an American philosopher. He is Julius Silver Professor of Philosophy at New York University, where he chaired the department from 1994 to 2004. His research interests include epistemology, the philosophy of mind, and the philosophy of language. He is also director of the New York Institute of Philosophy and Distinguished Research Professor of Philosophy at the University of Birmingham.

== Education and career ==
The child of Armenian genocide survivors, Boghossian was born in Haifa and left Israel at age 15 for Canada. He earned a B.S. in physics at Trent University in 1978 and a Ph.D. in philosophy at Princeton University in 1987. Before joining the faculty at NYU, he was a professor of philosophy at the University of Michigan from 1984 to 1992, and was also a visiting professor at Princeton. He has held research fellowships from the National Endowment for the Humanities, Magdalen College, Oxford, the University of London, and the Australian National University, and is a fellow of the New York Institute for the Humanities. He has served on the editorial board of Philosophers' Imprint, Episteme, and Philosophical Studies. In postmodern circles, he is known for his response to the Sokal hoax.

His book Fear of Knowledge won a Choice Award as an outstanding Academic Book of 2006.

In 2012, he was elected a Fellow of the American Academy of Arts and Sciences.

As chair of the NYU philosophy department from 1994 to 2004, Boghossian is credited with transforming it from a department without a Ph.D. program into the top-ranked philosophy program in the United States, through an intensive hiring campaign focused on core areas of analytic philosophy.

In 2025 and 2026, Boghossian chaired a group commissioned by the chancellors of Vanderbilt University and Washington University to examine the state of the academic humanities. The resulting report criticized these fields for "deterioration in scholarly standards fueled by the substitution of political criteria for properly scholarly criteria in the assessment of research and a more general repudiation of long-standing ideals of rigor and objectivity".

== Philosophical work ==
Boghossian is known for defending a version of the analytic–synthetic distinction in the face of Quine's influential critique. In Analyticity Reconsidered (1996) and subsequent work, he distinguishes between metaphysical analyticity—a statement being true purely in virtue of its meaning—and epistemic analyticity, where understanding a statement's meaning is sufficient to justify belief in its truth. Boghossian concedes that Quine was right to doubt the metaphysical notion of analyticity, but argues that the epistemic notion remains coherent and valuable for explaining certain kinds of a priori knowledge. In subsequent (and ongoing) work, he acknowledges that epistemic analyticity cannot account for all instances of a priori knowledge—such as knowledge of color exclusion facts or normative principles—and increasingly emphasizes the role of rational intuition as a complementary, non-linguistic source of a priori justification.

In metaepistemology, Boghossian is a leading critic of epistemic relativism and constructivism. In Fear of Knowledge (2006), he challenges what he terms the doctrine of Equal Validity, the idea that there are many radically different yet equally valid ways of knowing the world, with science being just one of them. Boghossian argues that such relativist positions are inherently self-defeating, as they cannot be consistently formulated without appealing to non-relativistic standards.

In the philosophy of color, Boghossian, in collaboration with David Velleman, has challenged both dispositional and physicalist accounts of color properties. Arguing that neither view can adequately capture the nature of color as we experience and conceptualize it, they propose instead that colors are monadic, non-relational, essentially qualitative properties—features that, on their view, cannot be instantiated by external objects. This leads them to endorse a form of color eliminativism.

In the philosophy of mind, Boghossian is known for introducing the "slow switching" argument against the compatibility of content externalism with privileged self-knowledge. Drawing on earlier work by Tyler Burge, Boghossian argues that if the content of one's thoughts depends on external environmental or linguistic factors, then gradual shifts in such contexts—such as moving from Earth to a Twin Earth where terms like "water" refer to chemically different substances—can alter the content of one's thoughts without the subject being introspectively aware of the change. Since individuals may remain unaware of such environmental shifts, they cannot, solely through introspection, determine the precise content of their thoughts (e.g., whether they are thinking of water or twin-water). This, Boghossian argues, undermines the notion that we possess authoritative, introspective access to the contents of our minds if those contents are externally individuated.

== Selected publications ==
=== Books ===
- Fear of Knowledge: Against Relativism and Constructivism, Oxford University Press, 2006.
- Content and Justification: Philosophical Papers, Oxford University Press, 2008.
- (with Timothy Williamson) Debating the A Priori, Oxford University Press, 2020.

=== Articles ===
- "How Are Objective Epistemic Reasons Possible?" in Philosophical Studies, Dec 2001, pp. 340–380.
- "Inference and Insight," in Philosophy and Phenomenological Research, November, 2001, pp. 633–641.
- "On Hearing the Music in the Sound," in The Journal of Aesthetics and Art Criticism (2002).
- "The Gospel of Relaxation" (review of The Metaphysical Club by Louis Menand), The New Republic, September 2001.
- "What is Social Construction?" in Times Literary Supplement, February 23, 2001, pp. 6–8.
- New Essays on the A Priori (co-edited with Christopher Peacocke), Oxford University Press 2000.
- "Knowledge of Logic," in New Essays on the A Priori, Oxford University Press 2000.
- "Analyticity," in Bob Hale and Crispin Wright (eds.): The Philosophy of Language (Oxford: Basil Blackwell, 1997), pp. 331–368.

=== Media ===
- 'The Secrets of the World': Debate with philosophers Rebecca Roache and Hilary Lawson, and author Rupert Sheldrake.
- 'The Word and the World': Debate with philosopher Ray Monk and novelist Joanna Kavenna.
- 'Strange New Worlds': Debate with literary critic Terry Eagleton and Chocolat author Joanne Harris.

== =External links ==
- Official website
