= Helga Varden =

Norwegian-American philosopher

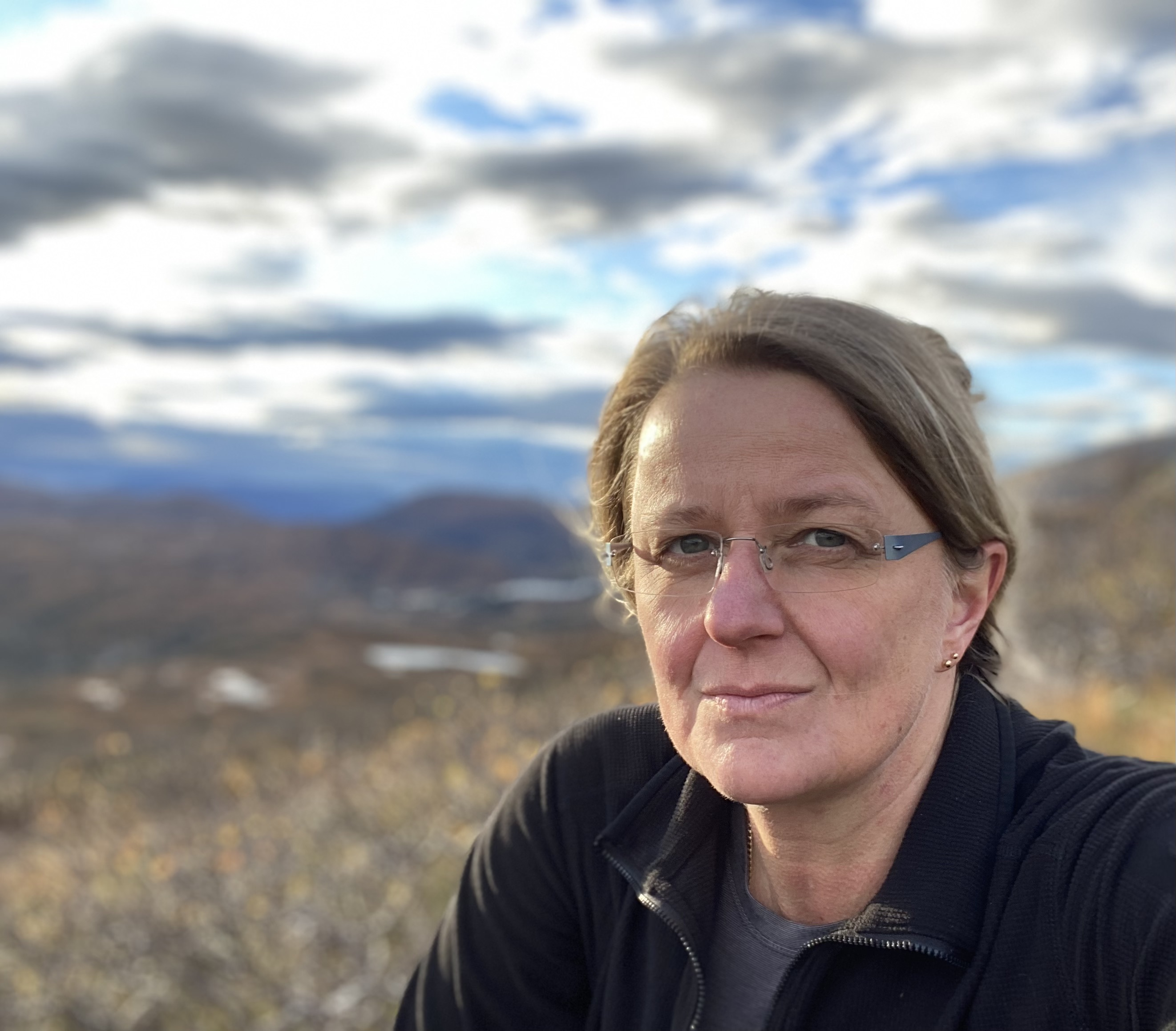
- Awards: William and Flora Hewlett Grant (2012–13); IVR Prize for Young Scholars (2007); George Paxton Young Memorial Prize (2005); Markus Herz Award (2005); Research Council of Norway scholarship (2004–05); Fulbright Fellowship (2000)

Education
- Education: University of Toronto (PhD); University of Tromsø (MA); LSE (MSc); Newcastle University (BA)
- Thesis: The Liberal Ideal of Political Obligations: The Lockean Voluntarist vs. Kant’s Non-Voluntarist Ideal of Political Obligations (2006)
- Doctoral advisor: Arthur Ripstein
- Other advisors: Gopal Sreenivasan; Sergio Tenenbaum; Daniel Weinstock; Sophia Moreau

Philosophical work
- Era: Contemporary philosophy
- Region: Western philosophy
- School: Kantianism
- Institutions: University of Illinois at Urbana-Champaign
- Main interests: Legal philosophy, political philosophy, feminist philosophy
- Website: https://helgavarden.com/

Helga Varden is a Norwegian-American philosopher and Professor of Philosophy and Gender and Women Studies at the University of Illinois at Urbana-Champaign. She was Brady Distinguished Visiting Professor in Ethics and Civic Life at Northwestern University between 2014-2015. She is known for her works on Kantian philosophy.

== Career ==
Helga Varden is a professor in philosophy (home department), in gender and women studies, and in political science at the University of Illinois at Urbana-Champaign. Varden’s main research interests are in Kant's practical philosophy as well as legal, political and feminist philosophy. In addition to her book—Sex, Love, and Gender: A Kantian Theory (OUP 2020)—she has published on a range of classical philosophical issues, including Kant’s answer to the murderer at the door, private property, political obligations, and political legitimacy, as well as on applied issues such as terrorism, care relations, privacy, poverty, and our moral responsibilities for animals.

== Selected publications ==
- Sex, Love, and Gender: A Kantian Theory, Oxford: Oxford University Press 2020
- Essays on Kant's Ethics and Political Philosophy (in Persian), Tehran: Naqde Farhang Publications, 2024
- (2021). “Towards a Kantian Theory of Philosophical Education and Human Wisdom—with the help of Arendt,” Journal of the Philosophy of Education, special edition on Kant on Education and Improvement: Themes and Problems, eds. David Bakhurst and Martin Sticker, pp. 1-16.
- (2021). “Kant and Arendt on Barbaric and Totalitarian Evil,” Proceedings of the Aristotelian Society, Vol. cxxi (2): 221-248.
- (2021). “Locke on Property,” in J. Gordon-Roth & S. Weinberg (eds.) 2021, The Lockean Mind, Routledge, pp. 428-437.
- (2020). “Kantian Care,” in Asha L. Bhandary & Amy Baehr (eds.) Caring for Liberalism: Dependency and Political Theory, Routledge, pp. 50-74.
- (2020). “Kant and Moral Responsibility for Animals,” in Lucy Allais and John Callanan (eds.) Kant & Animals, Oxford: Oxford University Press, pp. 157-175.
- (2018). “Kant on Sex. Reconsidered: A Kantian Account of Sexuality: Sexual love, Sexual Identity, and Sexual Orientation,” Feminist Philosophy Quarterly 4(1): 1-33.
- (2017). “Kant and Women.” Pacific Philosophical Quarterly, Vol. 98(4): 653-694. (Electronic publication, Oct. 24, 2015.) DOI:10.1111/papq.12103
- (2016). “Rawls vs. Nozick vs. Kant on Domestic Economic Justice,” in Kant and Social Policies, eds. Andrea Luisa Bucchile Faggion, Nuria Sánchez Madrid, Alessandro Pinzani, Palgrave Macmillan, pp. 93-123.
- (2014). “The Terrorist Attacks in Norway, July 22nd 2011— Some Kantian Reflections.” Norsk Filosofisk Tidsskrift/Norwegian Journal of Philosophy, Vol. 49(3-4): 236-59.
- (2012). “A Kantian Critique of the Care Tradition: Family Law and Systemic Justice.” Kantian Review, 17(2): 327-356.
- (2012). “The Lockean ‘Enough-and-as-Good’ Proviso - an Internal Critique.” Journal of Moral Philosophy 9, pp. 410-22.
- (2011). “A Kantian Conception of Global Justice.” Review of International Studies, Vol. 37(5): 2043-2057.
- (2010). “Kant and Lying to the Murderer at the Door… One more Time: Kant’s Legal Philosophy and Lies to Murderers and Nazis.” The Journal of Social Philosophy, Vol. 41, No. 4, Winter 2010: 403-421.
- (2010). ”Kant’s Non-Absolutist Conception of Political Legitimacy: How Public Right ‘Concludes’ Private Right in ‘The Doctrine of Right’.”Kant-Studien, Heft 3: 331-51.
- (2008). “Kant’s Non-Voluntarist Conception of Political Obligations: Why Justice is Impossible in the State of Nature.” Kantian Review, Vol. 13(2): 1-45.
- (2006). “Kant and Dependency Relations: Kant on the State’s Right to Redistribute Resources to Protect the Rights of Dependents.” Dialogue – Canadian Philosophical Review, Vol. XLV: 257-84.
