= S. Matthew Liao =

Taiwanese-born American philosopher

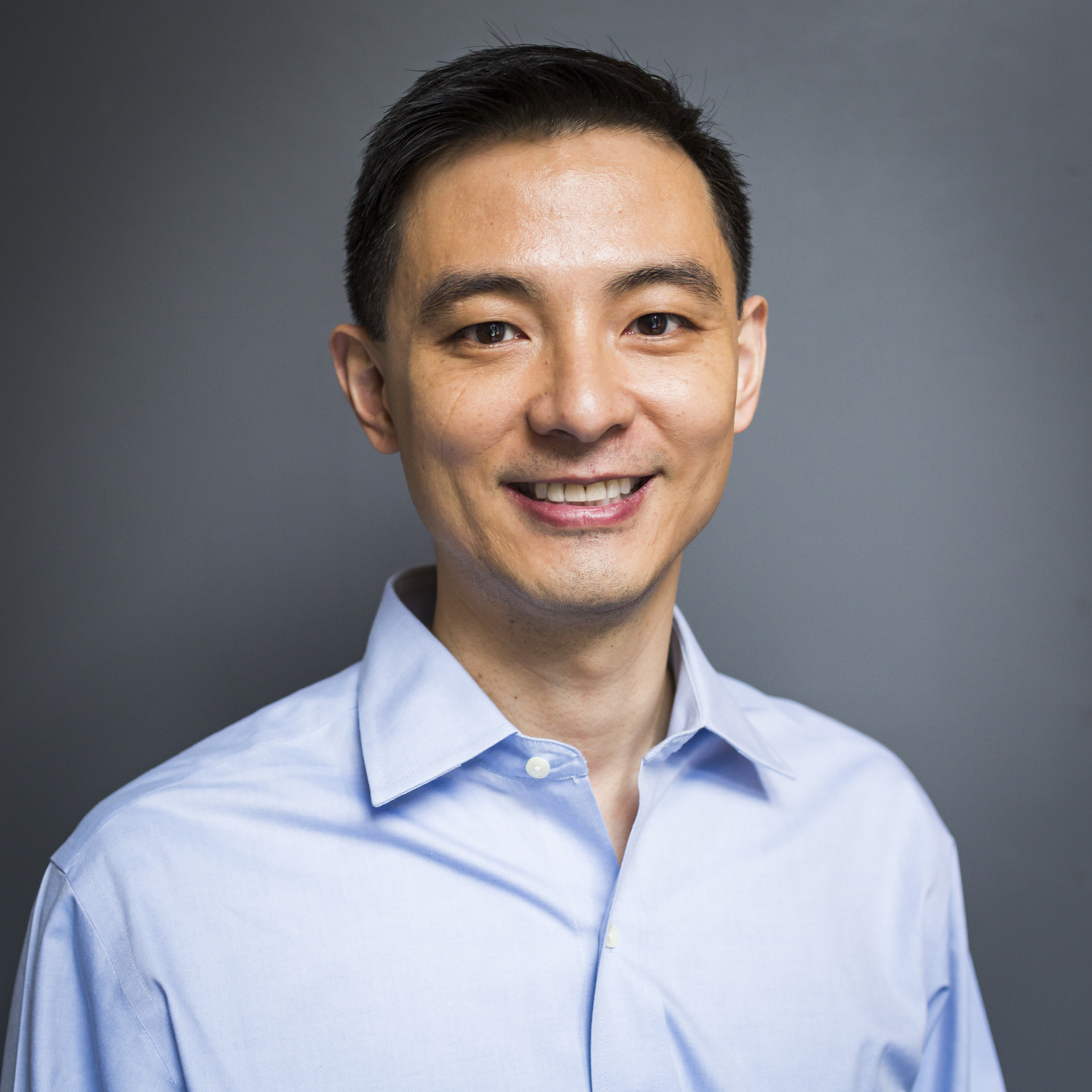
- Born: 1972 (age 53–54); Taichung, Taiwan

Education
- Education: Princeton University (BA); University of Oxford (DPhil)
- Thesis: The right of children to be loved (2001)

Philosophical work
- Era: Contemporary philosophy
- Region: Western philosophy
- School: Analytic
- Main interests: Bioethics; Normative Ethics; Political Philosophy; Epistemology; Moral Psychology; Metaphysics

S. Matthew Liao (born 1972) is a Taiwanese-American philosopher specializing in bioethics and normative ethics. He is the Arthur Zitrin Chair of Bioethics at New York University, where he is also the director of the Center for Bioethics and Affiliated Professor in the Department of Philosophy. He has previously held appointments at Oxford, Johns Hopkins, Georgetown, and Princeton.

In addition to his many publications, Liao has written one book, The Right to Be Loved, and edited or co-edited four others. Their titles are: Philosophical Foundations of Human Rights (2015), Moral Brains: The Neuroscience of Morality (2016), Current Controversies in Bioethics (2017), and Ethics of Artificial Intelligence (2020). He is currently writing an upcoming popular press book that analyzes the ethical dilemmas posed by near-term neurotechnologies.

Liao is the editor-in-chief of the Journal of Moral Philosophy and, in 2019, he was appointed as an Elected Fellow at The Hastings Center.

== Biography ==
Liao received his undergraduate degree magna cum laude in politics from Princeton University in 1994 and then earned his D.Phil. in philosophy at Oxford University in 2001. His doctoral dissertation concerned whether children have a right to be loved and what it might consist of. He then held teaching positions at Oxford, including at its Uehiro Institute for Practical Ethics, until 2003.

From 2003 to 2004, Liao was the Harold T. Shapiro Research Fellow in the University Center for Human Values at Princeton University. From 2004 to 2006, he served as the Greenwall Research Fellow at Johns Hopkins University and as a Visiting Researcher at the Kennedy Institute of Ethics at Georgetown University.

From 2006 to 2009, he was the deputy director and James Martin Senior Research Fellow in the Program on the Ethics of the New Biosciences at Oxford University. While there, he founded Ethics Etc., a group blog for discussing contemporary philosophical issues in ethics and related areas, which has received over 10 million hits since 2007. Since 2009, he has held an appointment in the Bioethics Department at New York University.

== Views ==
=== Children's Rights and Human Rights ===
In 2015, Liao wrote a book called The Right to Be Loved, which explores the foundations of children’s right to be loved and whether love can be an appropriate object of rights. He draws together interdisciplinary research from philosophy, human development, and neuroscience to argue that children have human rights to the fundamental conditions for pursuing a characteristically good life, and that being loved is one such condition. The book raises novel questions about the obligations that parents have toward their children and, among other things, suggests that we should reimagine public policies regarding adoption. The Right to Be Loved received Choice Review’s Outstanding Academic Title award and, in 2017, was the central focus of a summer school in Antwerp.

Liao has applied insights from his work on children’s rights to broader issues of human rights and public health ethics. In his volume, Philosophical Foundations of Human Rights, he expands this account, arguing that having rights to the fundamental conditions also entails having rights to the means necessary to attain them. In particular, he identifies human rights to certain fundamental capacities, such as the ability to think, be motivated by facts, develop interpersonal relationships, and choose an act freely; the social institutions required to exercise those capacities; and the goods or resources necessary to sustain ourselves. Recently, Liao has extended this framework to argue that we have the human right to basic health and public health care, and outlined the responsibilities that these rights place upon governments, transnational corporations, NGOs and charities, and individual citizens.

=== Neuroethics ===
Liao has written extensively about the ethical questions raised by recent advances in neurotechnology, such as psychopharmaceuticals, functional magnetic resonance imaging, and deep brain stimulation. For instance, he suggests some parents who find themselves unable to love their children might use drugs to induce those feelings in themselves. Liao argues that we already enhance our ability to feel love through a variety of non-pharmacological means, including spending more time with them, processing our reasons for antipathy, and reflecting on the role of love in human development. However, those alone are not always enough. Certain pharmacological drugs such as propranolol and oxytocin have been found enhance affiliative behavior and feelings of affection. Liao contends that, in light of children’s right to be loved, parents unable to love their children may be duty-bound to take these ‘love pills’ after other avenues are exhausted.

Liao has also discussed the use of memory modification technologies (MMTs) to deaden traumatic memories and treat post-traumatic stress disorder. For instance, beta blockers like propranolol can reduce the emotional strength of memories, making them consolidated less strongly in our long-term memory. Liao analyzes ways in which MMTs can harm ourselves and others, including by alienating us from our true selves, interfering with our moral agency, and forgetting important events. He makes a case on the behalf of patients with trauma, arguing that there may be times when using MMTs is permissible. He has also discussed the ethical dilemmas involved in using MMTs to make soldiers more resilient against the traumas of combat. For example, reducing the emotional impact of killing might diminish soldiers’ conscience. In 2015, Liao gave a TED Talk at CERN discussing his work on the ethics of memory modification and PTSD.

=== Ethics of Artificial Intelligence ===
Liao works at the forefront of the emerging field of AI ethics, having recently completed the volume Ethics of Artificial Intelligence, which brings together perspectives from some of the most prominent philosophers and AI researchers on AI and morality. In 2016, he co-organized an international conference focusing on the same topic at NYU. Liao has also spoken about the implications of designing and using AI devices in healthcare settings, developing a pragmatic, rights-based framework for assessing the ethical risks of AI tools.

=== Ethics of Reproductive Technology ===
Liao also has explored the ethical questioned raised by advances in reproductive technology, such as the use of CRISPR-Cas9 for germline gene editing, ‘three-parent IVF’ or mitochondrial replacement therapy, and embryonic stem cell research. Recently, he forwarded a rights-based theories of reproductive genetic engineering, arguing that people should not use gene editing deliberately to create offspring who will lack any of the fundamental capacities for pursuing a good life. For instance, assuming that hearing is one such capacity, prospective parents should not use gene editing technologies such as CRISPR with the intention of making their future child deaf. Liao contrasts this human rights account of reproductive engineering with perfectionist, libertarian, and life-worth-living theories thereof, arguing that the fundamental conditions help establish a lower bound for the permissibility of gene editing.

Liao has also written about mitochondrial replacement techniques (MRTs), or three-parent IVFs, which replace an egg or zygote’s mitochondrial DNA with genetic material from a third party to prevent certain genetic diseases from being passed down. This method raises the question of whether MRTs affect an already existing being or bring into existence an entirely new one. Liao argues that the enucleation process involved in MRTs disrupts the zygote’s organismic continuity, thus creating a numerically distinct being and raising distinct ethical issues. He has extended this research into the policy domain, collaborating with members of the Human Fertilisation and Embryology Authority and the Nuffield Council on Bioethics to outline policy, regulatory, and legal approaches to MRTs.

In addition, Liao has analyzed the ethics of embryonic stem cell research, which may believed should be banned because the process of harvesting them destroys embryos. He proposes the Blastocyst Transfer Method as an alternate extraction method, which removes enough pluripotent stem cells from the inner cell mass to form a stem cell line without harming the embryo. Liao has also argued against the Embryo Rescue Case, which forces one to choose between saving a child or any number of embryos. He contends that simply because it seems wrong to save the embryos instead of the child, that does not necessarily demonstrate that embryos are not rightsholders. As one of the founding members of the Hinxton Group, Liao also took part in drafting policy and legal recommendations regarding the ethical use of stem cells.

=== Human Engineering ===
Liao is well-known for pioneering the idea of human engineering as a potential solution to accelerating climate change. In the paper, Human Engineering and Climate Change, he assesses proposed behavioral, market, and geoengineering solutions to climate change, arguing that they fall short because of insufficient motivation, the difficulty of implementing reforms, and gaps in scientific knowledge. Instead, Liao advocates for enhancing humans in order to reduce our carbon footprints. For instance, he suggests designing drugs that would make us intolerant of meat, which requires significant energy to produce, or cause future humans to be smaller or shorter. Similarly, he proposes that we research cognitive enhancement, as intelligence is linked to lower birth rates, and moral enhancement, as a way to amplify our altruism and empathy. Liao argues that human engineering is less risky that global-scale geoengineering projects and would increase the efficacy of behavioral and market solutions. This line of thought has been the subject of significant discussion and, in 2013, Liao gave a TED Talk on it in New York City. In 2016, Liao proposed the idea that humans could be made to consume less meat by making the population at large allergic to its consumption, using tick-borne Alpha-gal syndrome as a possible vector for spreading such an allergy.

=== Normative Ethics ===
Liao has also worked on theories of non-consequentialism, reconciling non-aggregation with saving the greater number, and the importance of intentions for moral permissibility. Recently, he argued against non-consequentialist theories which claim that an actor’s reasons against harming others should be understood in terms of those who will be harmed instead of the actor’s mental states. Liao contends that this victim-centered approach generates counter-intuitive conclusions in dilemmas that other non-consequentialist theories such as the Doctrine of Double Effect can answer easily. Separately, he has addressed the Number Problem, which concerns how the greater number could be rescued without aggregating their claims and violating the separateness of persons. Liao makes the case that non-consequentialists need not omit numbers altogether so long as they consider other inputs, such as justice, an agent’s intentions, and so on.

Liao has also written about the role and importance of intention in moral decision-making. For instance, he has analyzed the Closeness Problem, according to which the DDE is flawed because an agent’s intention might be so fine-grained that it would not constitute intended harm despite the impermissibility of their act. Liao examines why existing answers to this problem fall short and argues that a pluralistic account of non-consequentialism does not because it draw on other considerations, such as consequences, using others as a mere means, and so on. In addition, he has defended the Intention Principle, on which an agent’s intention can render an otherwise permissible act impermissible. Liao argued that cases developed by Judith Jarvis Thomson, Frances Kamm, and T. M. Scanlon that seemed undermine this principle suffered from confounding factors that undermined their force.

=== Philosophical Methods ===
Liao is also interested in philosophical methodology, especially the evidentiary status and role of folk intuitions. He argues that research in experimental philosophy does not disprove the reliability of commonsense intuitions, even if those judgments can sometimes conflict. Instead, he forwards a framework for integrating a moderate experimentalist approach with traditional philosophical analysis. For instance, Liao has drawn on evidence that judgments about Judith Jarvis Thomson's famous Loop Case are context-dependent to suggest that her interpretation of the thought experiment is flawed. More recently, Liao drew together insights from philosophy, psychology, and neuroscience to argue that intuitions should not be understood as heuristics and explores the broader implications that a novel approach to them might have for discussions about their robustness.

== Bibliography ==
=== Books ===
- Ethics of Artificial Intelligence (ed.), Oxford University Press 2020.
- Current Controversies in Bioethics (ed.), Routledge 2016.
- Moral Brains: The Neuroscience of Morality (ed.), Oxford University Press 2016.
- Philosophical Foundations of Human Rights (ed.), Oxford University Press 2015.
- The Right to Be Loved, Oxford University Press 2015.

=== Selected articles ===
- Liao, S. Matthew (2005). "The Ethics of Using Genetic Engineering for Sex Selection". Journal of Medical Ethics. 31 (2): 116–118. doi:10.1136/jme.2003.005983. PMC 1734079. PMID 15681683.
- Liao, S. Matthew (2005). "Rescuing Human Embryonic Stem Cell Research: The Blastocyst Transfer Method". The American Journal of Bioethics. 5 (6): 8–16. doi:10.1080/15265160500318746. PMID 16282102. S2CID 86348915.
- Liao, S. Matthew (2006). "The Right of Children to Be Loved". Journal of Political Philosophy. 14 (4): 420–440. doi:10.1111/j.1467-9760.2006.00262.x.
- Liao, S. Matthew (2008). "A Defense of Intuitions". Philosophical Studies. 140 (2): 247–262. doi:10.1007/s11098-007-9140-x. JSTOR 27734294. S2CID 170440977.
- Liao, S. Matthew; Sandberg, Anders (2008). "The Normativity of Memory Modification". Neuroethics. 1 (2): 85–99. doi:10.1007/s12152-008-9009-5. S2CID 18284483.
- Liao, S. Matthew (2010). "The Basis of Human Moral Status". Journal of Moral Philosophy. 7 (2): 159–179. doi:10.1163/174552409X12567397529106.
- Liao, S. Matthew (2011). "Parental Love Pills: Some Ethical Considerations". Bioethics. 25 (9): 489–494. doi:10.1111/j.1467-8519.2009.01796.x. PMID 20132194. S2CID 20340055.
- Liao, S. Matthew (2012). "Putting the Trolley in Order: Experimental Philosophy and the Loop Case". Philosophical Psychology. 25 (5): 661–671. doi:10.1080/09515089.2011.627536. S2CID 18402436.
- Liao, S. Matthew; Etinson, Adam (2012). "Political and Naturalistic Conceptions of Human Rights: A False Polemic?". Journal of Moral Philosophy. 9 (3): 327–352. doi:10.1163/17455243-00903008.
- Liao, S. Matthew; Sandberg, Anders; Roache, Rebecca (2012). "Human Engineering and Climate Change". Ethics, Policy & Environment. 15 (2): 206–221. Bibcode:2012EPolE..15..206L. doi:10.1080/21550085.2012.685574. S2CID 6644012.
- Liao, S. Matthew (2016). "Health (care) and Human Rights: A Fundamental Conditions Approach". Theoretical Medicine and Bioethics. 37 (4): 259–274. doi:10.1007/s11017-016-9373-9. PMID 27476575. S2CID 28071854.
- Liao, S. Matthew (2017). "Do Mitochondrial Replacement Techniques Affect Qualitative or Numerical Identity". Bioethics. 31 (1): 20–26. doi:10.1111/bioe.12308. PMID 27973721. S2CID 3768632.
- Liao, S. Matthew (2019). "Designing Humans: A Human Rights Approach". Bioethics. 33 (1): 98–104. doi:10.1111/bioe.12519. PMID 30311673. S2CID 52962266.

== See also ==
- Ethics of artificial intelligence
- Neuroethics
- Mind uploading
- Neuroenhancement
- Normative ethics
- Sorites Paradox
- Natural rights and legal rights
- Bioterrorism
