= North American Kant Society =

American philosophical society (established 1985)

- Founders: Hoke Robinson; Lewis White Beck
- Established: 1985
- Mission: The study of Kantian philosophy
- President: Daniel Sutherland
- Chair: Robert Clewis
- Key people: Huaping Lu-Adler
- Website: https://northamericankantsociety.org/

North American Kant Society (NAKS) is an organization whose purpose is to advance the study of Kantian thought and scholarship. It was established by the philosopher Hoke Robinson in 1985 at the Sixth International Kant Conference hosted on the campus of the Pennsylvania State University.

The internationally noted Kantian scholar Lewis White Beck contributed to the founding of the North American Kant Society in 1985 while fostering cooperative research into the works of Kant among scholars in both the United States and Germany during the twentieth century.

The journal Kantian Review is published by the North American Kant Society in collaboration with Cambridge University Press.

== Awards ==
=== The Henry Allison Senior Scholar Prize ===
This prize is granted annually for an outstanding article or book dealing with different aspects of Kant’s philosophy, with articles and books awarded in alternating years.

- 2024 Tobias Rosefeldt, "Kant on Decomposing Synthesis and the Intuition of Infinite Space," Philosopher's Imprint, January 2022, 22 (1), 1-23.
- 2023 Helga Varden, Sex, Love, and Gender: A Kantian Account (Oxford University Press, 2020)
- 2022 Patrick Kain, 'The Development of Kant’s Conception of Divine Freedom', in Brandon C. Look (ed.), Leibniz and Kant (Oxford University Press, 2021).
- 2020 Marcus Willaschek, Kant on the Sources of Metaphysics: The Dialectic of Pure Reason (Cambridge, 2019)
- 2019 Melissa Merritt, Kant on Reflection and Virtue (Cambridge, 2018)
- 2018 Konstantin Pollok, Kant's Theory of Normativity: Exploring the Space of Reason (Cambridge, 2017)
- 2016 Lucy Allais, Manifest Reality: Kant’s Idealism and his Realism (Oxford, 2015)
- 2015 Julian Wuerth, Kant on Mind, Action, and Ethics (Oxford, 2014)
- 2014 Pauline Kleingeld, Kant and Cosmopolitanism: The Philosophical Ideal of World Citizenship (Cambridge, 2013)

=== Sellars Prize Winners ===
- 2019 Samuel Kahn, "Kant, an Unlucky Philosopher of Luck"
- 2018 Robert Clewis, “Beauty and Utility in Kant’s Aesthetics: The Origins of Adherent Beauty”
- 2016 Erica Holberg, "The Importance of Pleasure in the Moral for Kant's Ethics"
- 2015 Mavis Biss, “Kantian Moral Striving”
- 2014 Justin Shaddock, "Kant and the Most Difficult Thing That Could Ever Be Undertaken on behalf of Metaphysics"
- 2013 Owen Ware, “Self-Love and Self-Conceit in Kant’s Moral Psychology."
- 2012 Eric Entrican Wilson, “Kant on Autonomy and the Value of Persons.”
- 2011 Ernesto V. Garcia, "A New Look at Kantian Respect for Persons."
- 2010 Matthew C. Altman, "What Kant Has to Teach Us About Same-Sex Marriage."

== See also ==
- North American Nietzsche Society
- North American Society for Philosophical Hermeneutics
