= Pauline Kleingeld =

Dutch philosopher

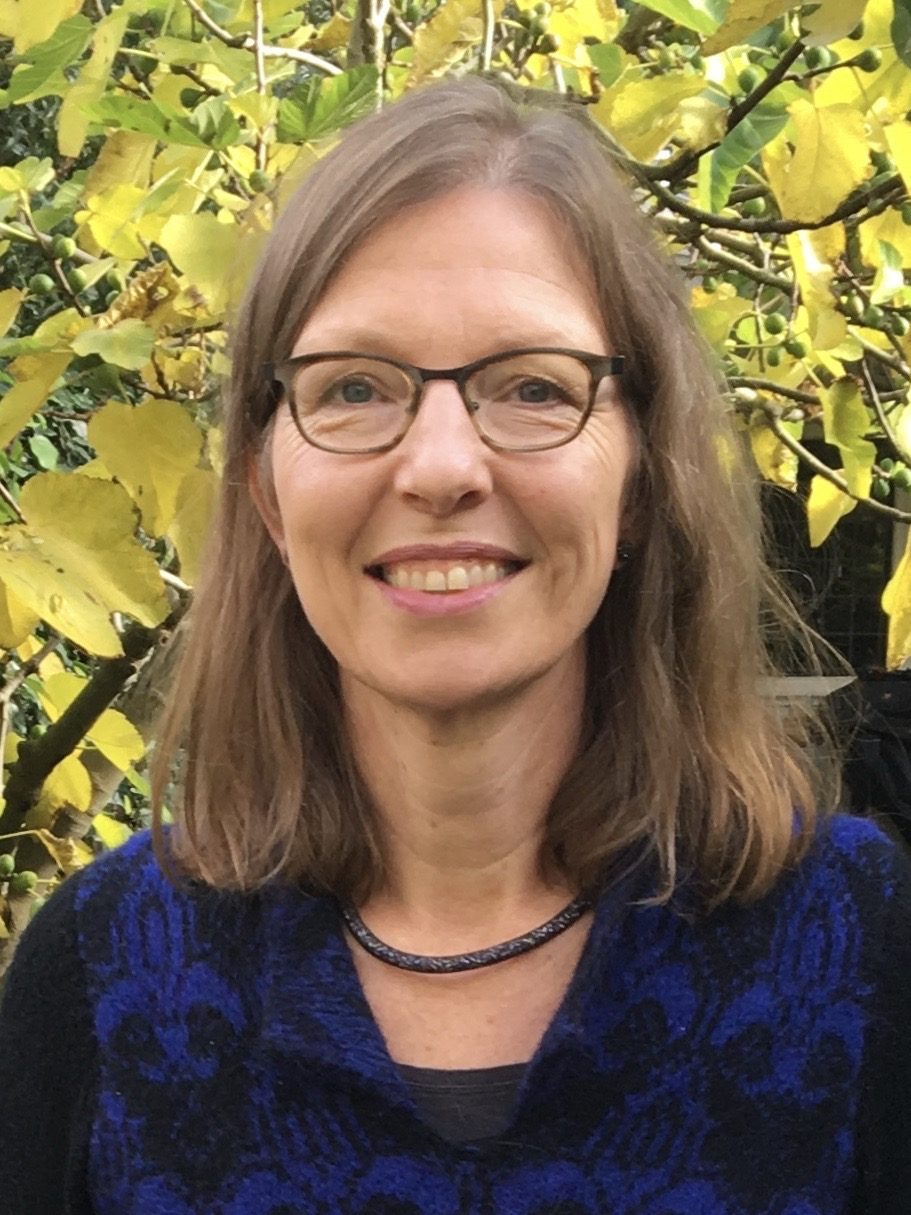
- Born: October 30, 1962 (age 63); Rotterdam

Philosophical work
- Era: 21st-century philosophy
- Region: Western philosophy
- Institutions: University of Groningen
- Main interests: Ethics
- Website: www.rug.nl/staff/pauline.kleingeld/

Pauline Kleingeld (born 1962) is Professor of Philosophy at the University of Groningen, the Netherlands. She is known for her work in ethics and political philosophy, with an emphasis on Kant and Kantianism. In 2020 she was awarded the Spinoza Prize.

== Education and career ==
Kleingeld studied at the Universities of Leiden and Frankfurt (religious studies and philosophy) and received her PhD from Leiden University in 1994 with a dissertation on Kant's philosophy of history. She taught at Washington University in St. Louis from 1993–2004, first as assistant professor, and from 2001 as associate professor of philosophy. She was Professor of Philosophy at Leiden University from 2004–2010. She has taught at the University of Groningen since 2011.

Kleingeld was elected a member of the Royal Holland Society of Sciences and Humanities in 2007, a member of the Royal Netherlands Academy of Arts and Sciences in 2015, a Corresponding Fellow of the British Academy in 2022, a member of the Berlin-Brandenburg Academy of Sciences and Humanities in 2022, a member of the Institut International de Philosophie in 2023, and a member of the Academia Europaea in 2023.

She served as President of the North American Kant Society from 2001–2003, as Dean of the Faculty of Philosophy, Leiden University, from 2006–2008, and as Chair of the Department of Ethics, Social and Political Philosophy at the University of Groningen from 2016–2020.

She has led many research projects funded by grants from the Dutch Research Council (NWO) and is currently the director of the research project funded by the Spinoza Prize, titled 'Kant, Kantianism and Morality'.

== Philosophical research ==
In her dissertation and first book, Fortschritt und Vernunft [Progress and Reason: On Kant's Philosophy of History] (1995), Kleingeld argues that Kant's philosophy of history plays a crucial role in his wider philosophical system.

In her second book, Kant and Cosmopolitanism (2012), she focuses on the discussion among Kant and his contemporaries about the ideal of world citizenship. This discussion offers new perspectives on current philosophical issues concerning the relation between cosmopolitanism and patriotism, the importance of states, the ideal of an international federation, cultural pluralism, and global justice. She also argues that Kant changed his views on many of these and related issues in the 1790s, including the issues of racial hierarchy and colonialism. The book was awarded the Biennial Senior Scholar Book Prize of the North American Kant Society.

In her more recent work, Kleingeld focuses on core issues in Kant's moral theory such as the various formulations of the Categorical Imperative, the notion of autonomy, freedom of the will, and Kant's method in the Groundwork for the Metaphysics of Morals.

In addition, she has written articles on moral psychology, on the Trolley Problem, on love and justice in the family, and on questions related to the sexism and racism in the work of Kant.

== Selected bibliography ==
=== Authored books ===
- Kant and Cosmopolitanism: The Philosophical Ideal of World Citizenship (Cambridge University Press 2012). (awarded the 2013 North American Kant Society Biennial Book Prize).
- Fortschritt und Vernunft: Zur Geschichtsphilosophie Kants. (Würzburg: Königshausen und Neumann, 1995).

=== Edited books ===
- Gottfried Achenwall, Natural Law: A Translation of the Textbook for Kant's Lectures on Legal and Political Philosophy. Edited by Pauline Kleingeld, translated by Corinna Vermeulen, with an introduction by Paul Guyer. London: Bloomsbury, 2020 (open access).
- Gottfried Achenwall, Prolegomena to Natural Law. Edited by Pauline Kleingeld, translated by Corinna Vermeulen. Groningen: University of Groningen Press, 2020 (open access).
- Immanuel Kant, 'Toward Perpetual Peace' and Other Writings on Politics, Peace, and History, New Haven: Yale University Press, 2006.

=== Articles ===
Her articles have been published in journals including:

- Philosophy & Public Affairs
- The Philosophical Quarterly
- Philosophers' Imprint
- Kant-Studien [Kantian Review]
- Journal of the History of Philosophy

as well as in numerous collections of essays.
