= Sex, Love, and Gender =

2020 book by Helga Varden

Sex, Love, and Gender: A Kantian Theory
- Author: Helga Varden
- Language: English
- Subject: philosophy of love, philosophy of sex, philosophy of gender
- Publisher: Oxford University Press
- Publication date: 2020
- Media type: Print (hardcover)
- Pages: 368
- ISBN: 9780198812838

Sex, Love, and Gender: A Kantian Theory is a 2020 book by Helga Varden in which the author applies Kantian thought to subjects such as philosophy of love and philosophy of sex.

== Reception ==
The book was reviewed by Melissa Seymour Fahmy in Mind, by Charlotte Sabourin in Kantian Review and by Lina Papadaki in Con-Textos Kantianos.

It was also reviewed by Jennifer Ryan Lockhart (Auburn University), Carol Hay (University of Massachusetts Lowell) and Janelle DeWitt (University of California Los Angeles) followed by a reply by Varden in SGIR Review.

== Synopsis ==
This book draws on Kant’s philosophy to construct a compelling philosophical account of sex, love, and gender that speaks to the lives of heterosexual, polysexual, polyamorous people, as well as those belonging to the LGBTQIA community. What makes Varden’s project unique is her sensitivity to sexual diversity, as well as her acknowledgement of the fact that we are rational, yet, also, embodied, social beings. In order to become healthy, affectionate and mindful gendered and sexual beings, she constantly reminds us, it is important to develop our full selves: our animality, humanity, and rationality.In her book, the author puts forward a careful analysis of Kant’s philosophy of virtue and right, while, at the same time, thoroughly examining Kant’s often perplexing views on sexuality, love, and gender. Even though those who are unfamiliar with Kant’s philosophy may find some parts of this book too advanced, it nonetheless makes an excellent introduction to Kant. The author offers an appealing reading of Kant’s much criticized views on sex, love, and gender, making the reader eager to further engage with his philosophy. At the same time, this book has a lot to offer to those more familiar with Kant, as well as Kant scholars. Varden thoroughly engages with the existing Kantian literature on sex, love, and gender, and overcomes many of what has created puzzlement, scorn, and even a total abandonment of Kant’s views, especially by feminist philosophers.
