= Frances Kamm =

20th- and 21st-century American philosopher

Frances M. Kamm
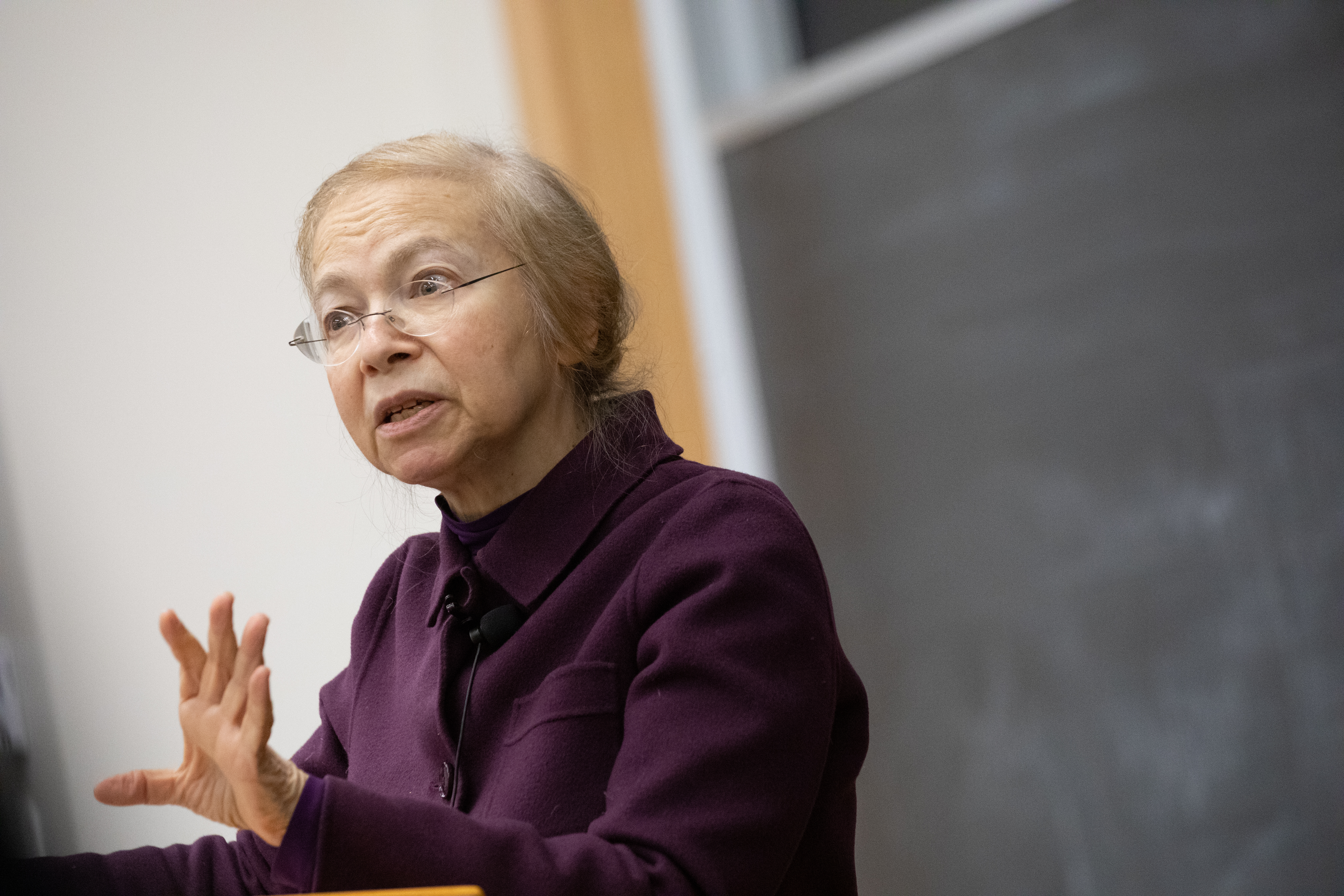
- Kamm in 2019

Education
- Education: Barnard College (BA); Massachusetts Institute of Technology (PhD)

Philosophical work
- Era: Contemporary philosophy
- Region: Western Philosophy
- School: Analytic philosophy
- Institutions: Rutgers University; Harvard University; New York University
- Main interests: Ethics, bioethics, philosophy of law, political philosophy, Kantianism

Frances Myrna Kamm (/kæm/) is an American philosopher specializing in normative and applied ethics. Kamm is currently the Henry Rutgers University Professor of Philosophy and Distinguished Professor of Philosophy at Rutgers University in New Brunswick, New Jersey. She is also the Littauer Professor of Philosophy and Public Policy Emerita at Harvard University's John F. Kennedy School of Government, as well as Professor Emerita in the Department of Philosophy at New York University.

== Biography ==
Kamm studied at Barnard College, receiving her B.A. in 1969. She completed her doctorate in 1980 at the MIT Department of Linguistics and Philosophy, where she was supervised by Barbara Herman. She was on the faculty of New York University during the 1980s to 1990s and received a professorship at Harvard in 2003, prior to her move to Rutgers.

Known for her use, and defence, of philosophical thought experiments and moral intuitions, Frances Kamm is a major figure in contemporary non-consequentialist ethics. Kamm's work spans across many issues in bioethics, normative ethics, and the philosophy of death, including: the moral justification of abortion, the ethics of war, physician-assisted suicide, the trolley problem and the doctrine of the double effect.

Kamm has worked as an ethics consultant for the World Health Organization. She is a fellow of the Hastings Center, an independent bioethics research institution in Garrison, New York. She held ACLS, AAUW, and Guggenheim fellowships, and has been a Fellow of the Program in Ethics and the Professions at the Kennedy School, the Center for Human Values at Princeton, and the Center for Advanced Study at Stanford. She is a member of the editorial boards of Philosophy & Public Affairs, Legal Theory, Bioethics, and Utilitas.

In August 2007, Kamm delivered the annual Oslo Lecture in Moral Philosophy. In 2008, she delivered the Uehiro Lectures at Oxford University in England. In 2011, Kamm was elected to the American Academy of Arts and Sciences as an ethics consultant. In 2013, she delivered the Tanner Lectures on Human Values at the University of California, Berkeley.

== Selected bibliography ==
Kamm has published a number of monographs:

- (1992). Creation and Abortion: a study in moral and legal philosophy, Oxford University Press
- (1994). Morality, Mortality Volume I: Death and Whom to Save from It, Oxford University Press
- (1994). Morality, Mortality Volume II: Rights, Duties, and Status, Oxford University Press
- (2007). Intricate Ethics: rights, responsibilities, and permissible harm, Oxford University Press
- (2011). Ethics of Enemies: terror, torture, and war, Oxford University Press
- (2012). The Moral Target: Aiming at Right Conduct in War and Other Conflicts, Oxford University Press
- (2013). Bioethical Prescriptions: To Create, End, Choose, and Improve Lives, Oxford University
- (2015). The Trolley Problem Mysteries, Oxford University Press
- (2020). Almost Over: Aging, Dying, Dead, Oxford University Press
- (2022). Rights and their limits: in theory, cases, and pandemics, Oxford University Press

Kamm has published a numbers papers in journals (including Journal of Philosophy, Philosophy & Public Affairs, Ethics, and Philosophical Studies), alongside contributing a number of chapters to edited volumes. A selection of her work can be found below:

- (1972). Abortion: A Philosophical Analysis, Feminist Studies, 1(2): 49–64.
- (1981). 'The Problem of Abortion', in R. Abelson and M. Friquenon (eds.), Ethics for Modern Life, 2nd ed, St Martin's Press
- (1983). Killing and Letting Die: Methodological and Substantive Issues, Pacific Philosophical Quarterly, 64: 297–312.
- (1985). Supererogation and obligation, Journal of Philosophy, 82(3): 118–138.
- (1985). Equal treatment and equal chances, Philosophy & Public Affairs, 14(2): 177-194
- (1986). Harming, Not Aiding, and Positive Rights, Philosophy & Public Affairs, 15 (1): 3-32.
- (1989). Harming Some to Save Others, Philosophical Studies, 57: 251–256.
- (1992). Non-consequentialism, the Person as an End-in-Itself, and the Significance of Status, Philosophy & Public Affairs, 21: 381–389.
- (1998). Moral Intuitions, Cognitive Psychology and the Harming/Not Aiding Distinction, Ethics, 108(3): 463-488
- (1998). Grouping and the Imposition of Loss, Utilitas, 10(3): 292-319
- (2000). The Doctrine of Triple Effect and Why A Rational Agent Need Not Intend the Means to His End, Aristotelian Society Supplementary Volume, 74: 41-57
- (2005). Aggregation and two moral methods, Utilitas, 17(1): 1-23
- (2009). Terrorism and Intending Evil, Philosophy & Public Affairs, 36(2): 157-186
- (2010). 'What Is and Is Not Wrong With Enhancement?', in J. Savulescu and N. Bostrom (ads.), Human Enhancement, Oxford University Press

== See also ==
- American philosophy
- Trolley problem
- Philosophical aspects of the abortion debate
- Just war theory
