= The Writer =

United States magazine for writers

- Categories: Literature
- Frequency: Monthly
- Founder: William H. Hills and Robert Luce
- First issue: April 1887
- Company: Madavor Media
- Country: United States
- Based in: Braintree, Massachusetts
- Website: www.writermag.com
- ISSN: 0043-9517

The Writer is a United States magazine for writers, published monthly by Madavor Media.

== History ==
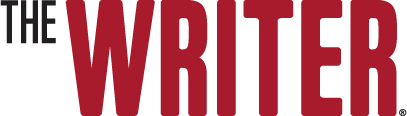
Previous logo

The Writer was first established by William H. Hills and Robert Luce, two Boston Globe reporters, as "a monthly magazine to interest and help all literary workers", in April 1887. Until the November 2000 issue, it was published in Boston. It is the oldest magazine for writers currently being published, and one of the oldest continually published magazines in the U.S. It is targeted at writers, and includes articles offering advice for writing and resources for publishing.

The Writer offers articles of interest to both novice and experienced writers, including market news, interviews, and tips on how to hone one's skills in particular aspects of the craft.

Over its 135-year history, The Writer has been overseen by a number of editors. Hills remained associated with the magazine until February 1926. On page 54 of that issue, he wrote a farewell essay in which he stated he felt he was putting the magazine in safe hands as he resigned his place as editor to William D. Kennedy.

Luce, who later became a Massachusetts Congressman, remained with the magazine through September 1888.

Hills is listed on the masthead as editor from April 1887 – September 1920, followed by Margaret Gordon as editor from October 1920 – September 1925. Hills is again listed from October 1925 until his retirement in February 1926. No explanation for Hills' absence from the masthead during Gordon's tenure is mentioned in those issues; but an editorial by Gordon in the Sept. 1925 issue (page 132), which refers to Hills as the magazine's conductor for nearly 40 years, suggests he was still involved in its operation, even if his name wasn't on the masthead. Hills' obituary in the December 1930 edition (page 315) also seems to indicate he was involved with the magazine continuously from 1887 to 1926.

William Dorsey Kennedy served as editor from March 1926 – December 1928.

From 1929 to 1933, an editorial board was listed, which prominently featured Virginia C. Lincoln and Bertha W. Smith. Other board members changed, but Lincoln and Smith, who were listed as publisher and managing editor, respectively, by the October 1929 issue, remained in those positions until February 1934.

From March 1934 – January 1936, Sargent Collier and Samuel G. Houghton served as publishers and editors.

The longest editorial era began in February 1936, when A.S. Burack took over the editor's chair. He would remain editor until his death in August 1978. Burack's widow, Sylvia, then took over as editor (and later as publisher as well). In 2000, she sold the magazine to Kalmbach Publishing.

From November 2000 to October 2007, The Writer was edited by Elfrieda Abbe, who also became publisher with the September 2006 issue. As of the November 2007 issue, she turned the editorial reins over to Jeff Reich (formerly the magazine's managing editor), to focus exclusively on her duties as publisher. She was preceded as publisher by Russell G. Larson and Judith Hill.

The Writer's current editorial board consists of James Applewhite, Andre Becker, T. Alan Broughton, Eve Bunting, Mary Higgins Clark, Roy Peter Clark, Barnaby Conrad, Lewis Burke Frumkes, James Cross Giblin, Gail Godwin, Eileen Goudge, Rachel Hadas, Shelby Hearon, John Jakes, John Koethe, Lois Lowry, Peter Meinke, Robert B. Parker, Katherine Patterson, Elizabeth Peters, Arthur Plotnik, and William G. Tapply. The late Phyllis A. Whitney had been a long-time editorial board member until her death in 2008.

Over the years, the magazine has gone through a number of physical changes. The first issue had only 18 pages; and for years The Writer had no illustrations. Currently, The Writer has more than 60 pages per issue, and includes color photographs on both the cover and interior.

The magazine's slogan has changed as well, since its inception. From at least 1896 to September 1925, the cover read, "A monthly magazine for literary workers." This changed to "An author's monthly forum" in October 1925. The new slogan ran until at least October 1929. From at least October 1930 – April 1932, the slogan changed subtly to "the author's forum." In March 1934, the slogan changed to "The pioneer magazine for literary workers", and would remain until October of that year. In November 1934, the slogan changed to "The oldest magazine for literary workers. Founded in Boston, 1887", and remained until 2000. At that point, the slogan changed to "The essential resource for writers since 1887." The slogan changed in December 2008 to "Advice and inspiration for today's writer," and again in January 2012 to "Imagine • Write • Publish."

In May 1962, during its 75th anniversary, The Writer was honored with a congratulatory letter from President John F. Kennedy.

As of 2011, The Writer has won the Folio magazine Editorial Excellence Award nine times.

In 2012, Kalmbach sold The Writer and BirdWatching to Madavor Media.
