= Sharon Street =

American philosopher and academic

- Born: 1973 (age 52–53)

Education
- Education: Amherst College; Harvard University

Philosophical work
- Era: Contemporary philosophy
- Region: Western philosophy
- School: Analytic philosophy
- Institutions: New York University; Harvard University
- Main interests: Metaethics, normative ethics
- Notable ideas: The metaethical implications of evolutionary biological explanations of normative capacities

Sharon Street (born 1973) is an American philosopher who is a professor of philosophy and chair of the Department of Philosophy at New York University. She specializes in metaethics, focusing in particular on how to reconcile our understanding of normativity with a scientific conception of the world.

== Education and career ==
Street received her B.A. from Amherst College in 1995 and her Ph.D. from Harvard University in 2003 under the supervision of Christine Korsgaard. Street's doctoral dissertation examined the metaethical implications of evolutionary biological explanations of our normative capacities, and whether such explanations might have an undermining effect on our moral and other normative commitments.

Street is currently Professor of Philosophy at New York University. She joined the NYU Philosophy Department in 2002.

== Philosophical work ==
Street's work has been particularly influential in the fields of metaethics, where she defends a doctrine she calls "Humean Constructivism", a term she uses to differentiate her work from the "Kantian constructivism" of her mentor, Christine Korsgaard. In addition to the development of Humean Constructivism, Street has also been an influential critic of naturalist and non-naturalist accounts of moral realism, as well as quasi-realist and theist metaethical positions.

== Bibliography (selected) ==
- Street, Sharon (January 2006). "A Darwinian Dilemma for Realist Theories of Value". Philosophical Studies. 127 (1). Springer: 109–166. doi:10.1007/s11098-005-1726-6. S2CID 170656319.
- Street, Sharon (2008). Russ Shafer-Landau (ed.). "Constructivism about Reasons". Oxford Studies in Metaethics. 3. Oxford Clarendon Press: 207–245. doi:10.1093/oso/9780199542062.003.0009. ISBN 978-0-19-954206-2.
- Street, Sharon (2009). "In Defense of Future Tuesday Indifference: Ideally Coherent Eccentrics and the Contingency of What Matters" (PDF). Philosophical Issues. 19. Wiley: 273–298. doi:10.1111/j.1533-6077.2009.00170.x.
- Street, Sharon (2010). "What is Constructivism in Ethics and Metaethics?". Philosophy Compass. 5 (5). Wiley: 363–384. doi:10.1111/j.1747-9991.2009.00280.x.
- Street, Sharon (2016). Peter Singer (ed.). "Nothing 'Really' Matters, but That's Not What Matters". Does Anything Really Matter: Parfit on Objectivity. Oxford University Press.
