= Richard Aquila =

Richard Aquila may refer to:

- Richard E. Aquila, American philosopher
- Richard Aquila (historian), American historian
- Richard II of Aquila, Italo-Norman nobleman and count of Fondi
