= John Richardson (philosopher) =

American philosopher

- Born: 1951 (age 74–75)

Education
- Education: Harvard University, University of California, Berkeley
- Doctoral advisor: Hubert Dreyfus

Philosophical work
- School: Continental philosophy
- Main interests: Heidegger, Nietzsche

John Richardson (born 1951) is a professor of philosophy at New York University. He is best known for his books on Heidegger and Nietzsche.

== Education and career ==
A graduate of Harvard University in 1972, he earned his Ph.D. from the University of California, Berkeley in 1981 under the supervision of Hubert Dreyfus. He has taught at New York University since 1981.

== Books ==
=== Authored books ===
- Existential Epistemology: A Heideggerian Critique of the Cartesian Project (Oxford University Press, 1986).
- Nietzsche's System (Oxford University Press, 1996).
- Nietzsche's New Darwinism (Oxford University Press, 2004).
- Heidegger (Routledge, 2012).
- Nietzsche's Values (Oxford University Press, 2020).

=== Edited books ===
- The Oxford Handbook of Nietzsche, with Ken Gemes (Oxford University Press, 2013).
- Nietzsche Oxford Readings in Philosophy, with Brian Leiter (Oxford University Press, 2001).
