= Peter Rohs =

German philosopher (born 1936)

Peter Rohs (born 11 January 1936) is a German philosopher.

== Academic career ==
Born in Jena, Rohs received his doctorate in 1964 from Christian-Albrechts-Universität at Kiel with a thesis on logic by Hegel and habilitated in 1975 at Goethe University in Frankfurt. He was a private lecturer for philosophy since 1975 and from 1985 to 1986 he was managing director of the Forum für Philosophie in Bad Homburg.

Since 1986 Rohs has been teaching as professor at the Philosophy Department of the Westfälische Wilhelms-Universität in Münster. At the centre of his thinking is the systematic project of a field-theoretical transcendental philosophy: he combines a field-theoretical interpretation of nature with a transcendental-philosophical theory of subjectivity. Rohs sees time as a bracket, he refers to the English philosopher John McTaggart Ellis McTaggart.

== Work ==
- Transzendentale Ästhetik. Anton Hain Verlag, Meisenheim 1973.
- Transzendentale Logik. Anton Hain Verlag, Meisenheim 1976.
- Die Vernunft der Erfahrung. Eine Alternative zum Anarchismus der Wissenschaftstheorie. Verlag Anton Hain Meisenheim, Königstein im Taunus 1979.
- Die Zeit des Handelns. Eine Untersuchung zur Handlungs- und Normentheorie. Verlag Anton Hain Meisenheim, Königstein im Taunus 1980. nschaft der Logik. Bouvier Verlag, Bonn 1982.
- Johann Gottlieb Fichte. C.H. Beck, München 1991.
- Form und Grund. Interpretation eines Kapitels der Hegelschen Wissenschaft der Logik. Bouvier Verlag, Bonn 1982.
- Feld-Zeit-Ich. Entwurf einer feldtheoretischen Transzendentalphilosophie. Klostermann, Frankfurt am Main 1996.
- Abhandlungen zur Feldtheoretischen Transzendentalphilosophie. Lit-Verlag, Münster 1998.
- Der Platz zum Glauben. Mentis, Münster 2013.
- Mind and the present. Outline of an analytic transcendental philosophy. Mentis, Münster 2020.

== Sources ==
- Marcus Willaschek (ed.): Feld-Zeit-Kritik. Die feldtheoretischen Transzendentalphilosophie von Peter Rohs in der Diskussion. Lit-Verlag, Münster 1997
