= Constitutivism =

Constitutivism is the position in meta-ethics which links what we ought to do morally with the rules about our make up as agents who perform actions of any kind. It claims to answer doubts about the validity of moral judgements, and about moral objectivity, by explaining that we cannot help but act, therefore we act in accordance with moral rules which are essential to any acting being.

Although a recent development in moral philosophy, it has its roots in the work of Kant in moral philosophy.

== Some authors in constitutivism ==
Christine Korsgaard and David Velleman are prominent writers on constitutivism, although defending different versions.

== Criticism ==
Constitutivism has been criticised for various reasons, chiefly for circularity. It is claimed that it presupposes the truth of what it seeks to justify, i.e. moral judgements and truths.
