= Arthur Ripstein =

American philosopher

- Born: Arthur Stephen Ripstein; June 12, 1958
- Spouse: Karen Weisman
- Awards: Killam Prize (2021)

Education
- Education: University of Manitoba (BA); Yale Law School (LLM); University of Pittsburgh (PhD)
- Thesis: Explanation and Empathy in Commonsense Psychology (1986)
- Doctoral advisor: John Haugeland

Philosophical work
- Era: Contemporary philosophy
- Region: Western philosophy
- School: Kantianism
- Institutions: University of Toronto
- Doctoral students: Helga Varden
- Main interests: Legal philosophy, political philosophy

Arthur Stephen Ripstein (born 12 June 1958) is a Canadian philosopher and Professor of Law and Philosophy and University Professor at the University of Toronto where he is Howard Beck QC Chair in law. He is known for his works on Kantian philosophy and is a winner of Izaak Walton Killam Memorial Prize.

== Books ==
- Private Wrongs (Harvard University Press, 2016)
- Rules for Wrongdoers (Oxford University Press, 2021)
- Kant and the Law of War (Oxford University Press, 2021)
- Force and Freedom: Kant's Legal and Political Philosophy (Harvard University Press, 2009)
- Equality, Responsibility and the Law (Cambridge University Press, 1998)
