= Dale Jamieson =

American philosopher

- Born: 1947 (age 78–79); Iowa, U.S.
- Scientific career
- Fields: Environmental studies
- Workplaces: Carleton College; New York University; University of Colorado Boulder

Dale Jamieson (born 1947) is Professor of Environmental Studies and Philosophy at New York University, a scholar of environmental ethics and animal rights, and an analyst of climate change discourse. He also serves as a faculty affiliate for the NYU School of Law and as director of NYU's Animal Studies Initiative, which was funded by Brad Goldberg with a $1 million donation in 2010. In addition to his affiliation with the NYU Departments of Environmental Studies and Philosophy, Jamieson also holds positions at The Dickson Poon School of Law and at the University of the Sunshine Coast in Australia.

Previously, Jamieson had been at Carleton College and the University of Colorado, Boulder, with visiting roles at other universities, including Cornell, Princeton, and Stanford. In 2015, he presented the Arthur C. Wickenden lecture at Miami University. He is a critic of geo-engineering proposals.

== Biography ==
Jamieson was born in Iowa, in 1947. He grew up in San Diego, California, where he was an avid surfer. He received his B.A. in 1970 from San Francisco State University, and his Ph.D. in philosophy from the University of North Carolina at Chapel Hill in 1976. He began his academic career at North Carolina State University, where he taught as a visiting instructor in philosophy from January 1975 to May 1978.

From 2009 to 2010, Jamieson served as the Wayne Morse Chair of Law and Politics, established in honor of the late former Senator, at the University of Oregon.

== Selected publications ==
- Animal Liberation is an Environmental Ethic (Environmental Values, 1997)
- Co-editor with Marc Bekoff, Readings in Animal Cognition (The MIT Press, 1995)
- Morality's Progress: Essays on Humans, Other Animals, and the Rest of Nature (Oxford, 2002)
- Ethics and the Environment: An Introduction (Cambridge, 2008)
- Co-editor with Lori Gruen and Chris Schlottmann, Reflecting on Nature: Readings in Environmental Philosophy, 2nd Edition (Oxford, 2012)
- Reason in a Dark Time: Why the Struggle to Stop Climate Change Failed--and What It Means For Our Future (Oxford, 2014)
- Love in the Anthropocene: Stories on Human Love in a World Without Nature co-authored with Bonnie Nadzam (OR Books, Sept 2015)
