= Anja Jauernig =

Philosophy professor (born 1972)

- Born: 1972 (age 53–54); Wehrda, West Germany

Academic background
- Education: Princeton University (PhD)
- Thesis: Leibniz Freed of Every Flaw: A Kantian Reads Leibnizian Metaphysics (2004)
- Doctoral advisor: Béatrice Longuenesse, Bas van Fraassen

Academic work
- Era: Contemporary philosophy
- Region: Western philosophy
- School or tradition: Kantianism
- Institutions: New York University
- Website: www.anjajauernig.com

Anja Jauernig (born 1972) is a German professor of philosophy at New York University Department of Philosophy.

== Biography ==
Jauernig was born in Wehrda, a small town in Germany that has since been incorporated into Marburg an der Lahn. She spent her formative years in Kirchzarten, a smaller town located in the Black Forest region near Freiburg im Breisgau. At the age of 15, her family relocated to Aachen, a city of historical significance as the residence of Charlemagne and the center of the Carolingian Empire around 800 AD.

She pursued undergraduate studies in philosophy, physics, and psychology at the University of Bonn, a city that formerly served as the capital of West Germany. Her academic trajectory included a year as a visiting student at the University of Oxford. Throughout her youth, she was actively involved in competitive swimming, spending a substantial portion of her time training and competing in pools—an environment she continues to enjoy.

In 1997, she moved to the United States to undertake doctoral studies in philosophy at Princeton University. She began her professional academic career in 2002 with a faculty position at the University of Notre Dame in Indiana. After nearly a decade in the Midwest, she relocated to the East Coast, first to University of Pittsburgh for three and a half years, and later to New York City, where she currently resides.

== Selected publications ==
- Jauernig, Anja (2021-02-18). The World According to Kant: Appearances and Things in Themselves in Critical Idealism (1 ed.). Oxford University PressOxford. doi:10.1093/oso/9780199695386.001.0001. ISBN 978-0-19-969538-6.
