= Barbara Herman =

American philosopher (born 1945)

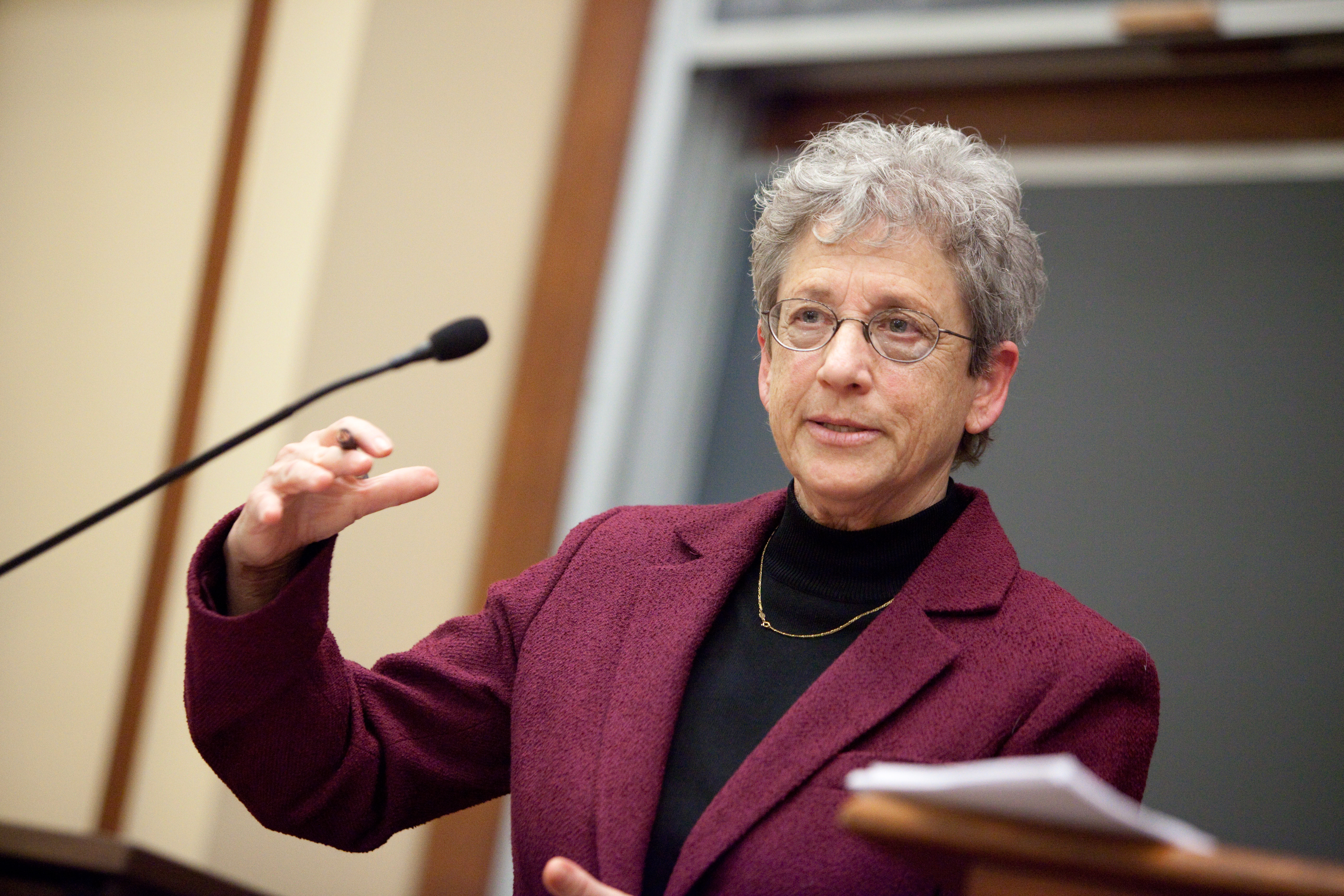
- Barbara Herman lecturing at the Edmond J. Safra Center for Ethics in 2011
- Born: May 9, 1945 (age 81); New York City

Education
- Education: Cornell University (BA); Harvard University (MA, PhD)
- Thesis: Morality as Rationality: A Study of Kant's Ethics (1976)
- Doctoral advisors: Stanley Cavell, John Rawls

Philosophical work
- Institutions: University of California, Los Angeles
- Main interests: Moral philosophy; Kantian ethics; History of ethics; Social and political philosophy
- Website: philosophy.ucla.edu/person/barbara-herman/

Barbara Herman (born May 9, 1945) is the Griffin Professor of Philosophy and Professor of Law at the University of California, Los Angeles Department of Philosophy. A well-known interpreter of Kant's ethics, Herman works on moral philosophy, the history of ethics, and social and political philosophy. Among her many honors and awards include a Guggenheim Fellowship (1985-1986) and election to the American Academy of Arts & Sciences (1995).

== Biography ==
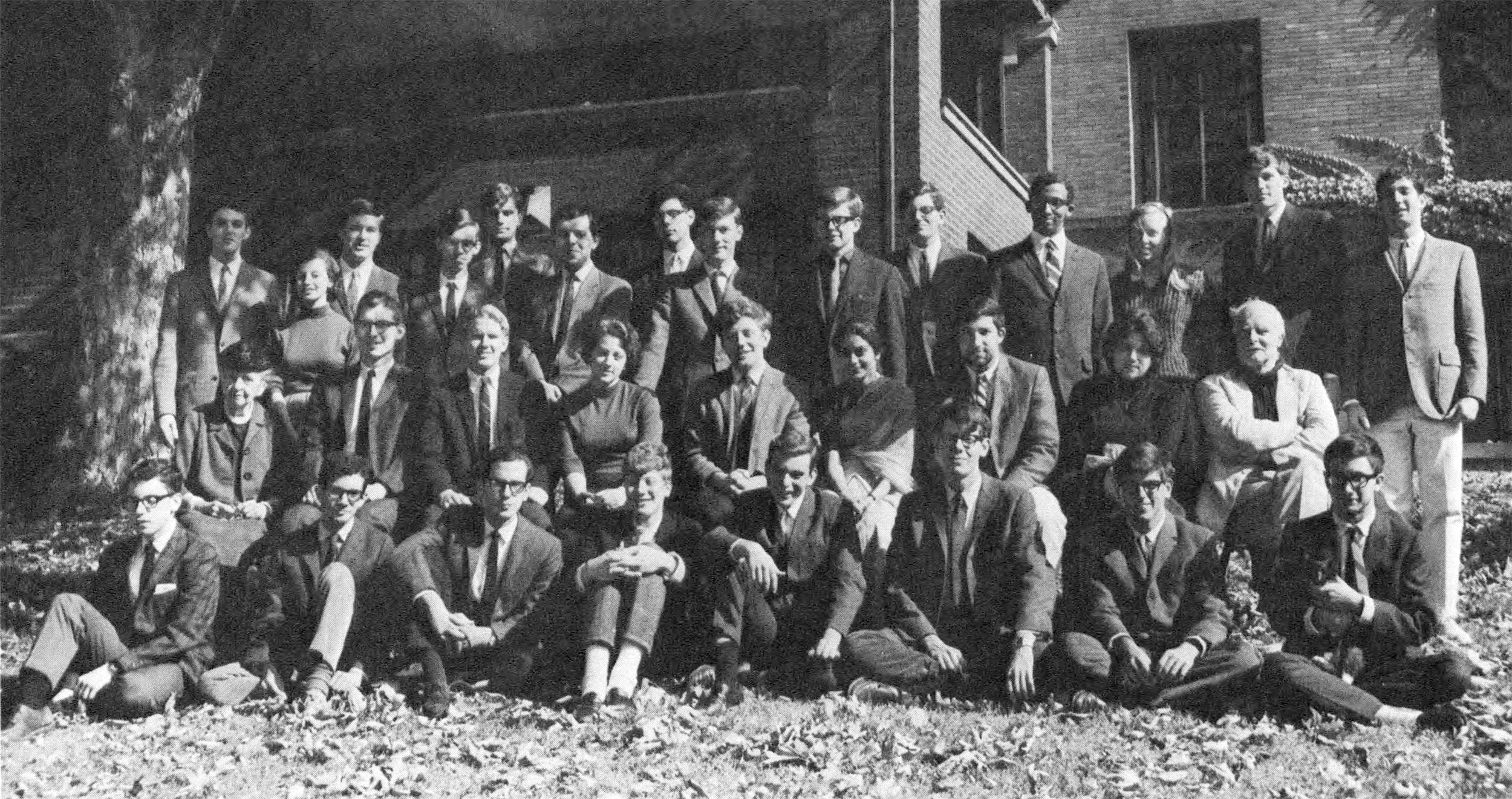
Barbara Herman as an undergraduate at Cornell (second row, fourth from the left) sits with fellow Telluride House members including faculty residents Frances Perkins (second row, first from the left) and Paul Grice (second row, first from the right).

Herman was born in New York City to Ruth and Robert Herman. Her mother was a secretary and her father a union organizer and professional fund-raiser. Her brother is physicist Jay Herman. Herman attended Flushing High School in Queens and Cornell University, where she majored in history. While a senior at Cornell, Herman was "the first woman to live at Telluride House under the new arrangements" after "Convention for the first time was able to grant full residential preferment to an undergraduate woman." There she lived alongside Gayatri Chakravorty Spivak, Clare Selgin Wolfowitz, and Paul Wolfowitz, as well as in-house faculty members including Frances Perkins and Paul Grice. She has since taught Telluride Association Summer Program (TASP) seminars at Deep Springs College and the Cornell branch.

Shortly after graduating from Cornell with a B.A. in 1966, Herman began doctoral studies in history at Harvard University. She soon discovered an affinity for philosophy and transferred to the philosophy department, but not before earning an M.A. in modern European history. Studying under Stanley Cavell and John Rawls, Herman wrote a dissertation entitled "Morality as Rationality: A Study of Kant's Ethics" in 1976.

Of Herman's time at Harvard, Martha Nussbaum said during her introduction to the Dewey Lecture at the University of Chicago Law School:

On a personal note, I remember feeling the power of that captivating presence on the memorable occasion when I first heard Barbara Herman speak. She probably doesn't remember this at all, but she was an older graduate student at Harvard and she was famous among us younger graduate students as one of the best, but I had never really met her or heard her even talk. And on this occasion she was addressing the whole faculty of the Harvard philosophy department about why the graduate students wanted to form a union. And I remember—and this is a pretty daunting occasion, with Van Quine, Nelson Goodman, and all these people sitting there who were actually not very friendly to the idea of a graduate student union—but I remember the confidence, incisiveness, and great humor with which she faced down that group, and I remember thinking, "this is a truly wise person as well as one who is a lot of fun."

From 1973 to 1980 Herman was assistant professor at the Massachusetts Institute of Technology. She then joined the faculty at the University of Southern California, first as a visiting assistant professor and then as an assistant professor, associate professor, and finally professor of philosophy and law in 1992. In 1994 Herman was appointed Griffin Professor of Philosophy at UCLA and in 2006 she was jointly appointed to the law school.

== Work ==
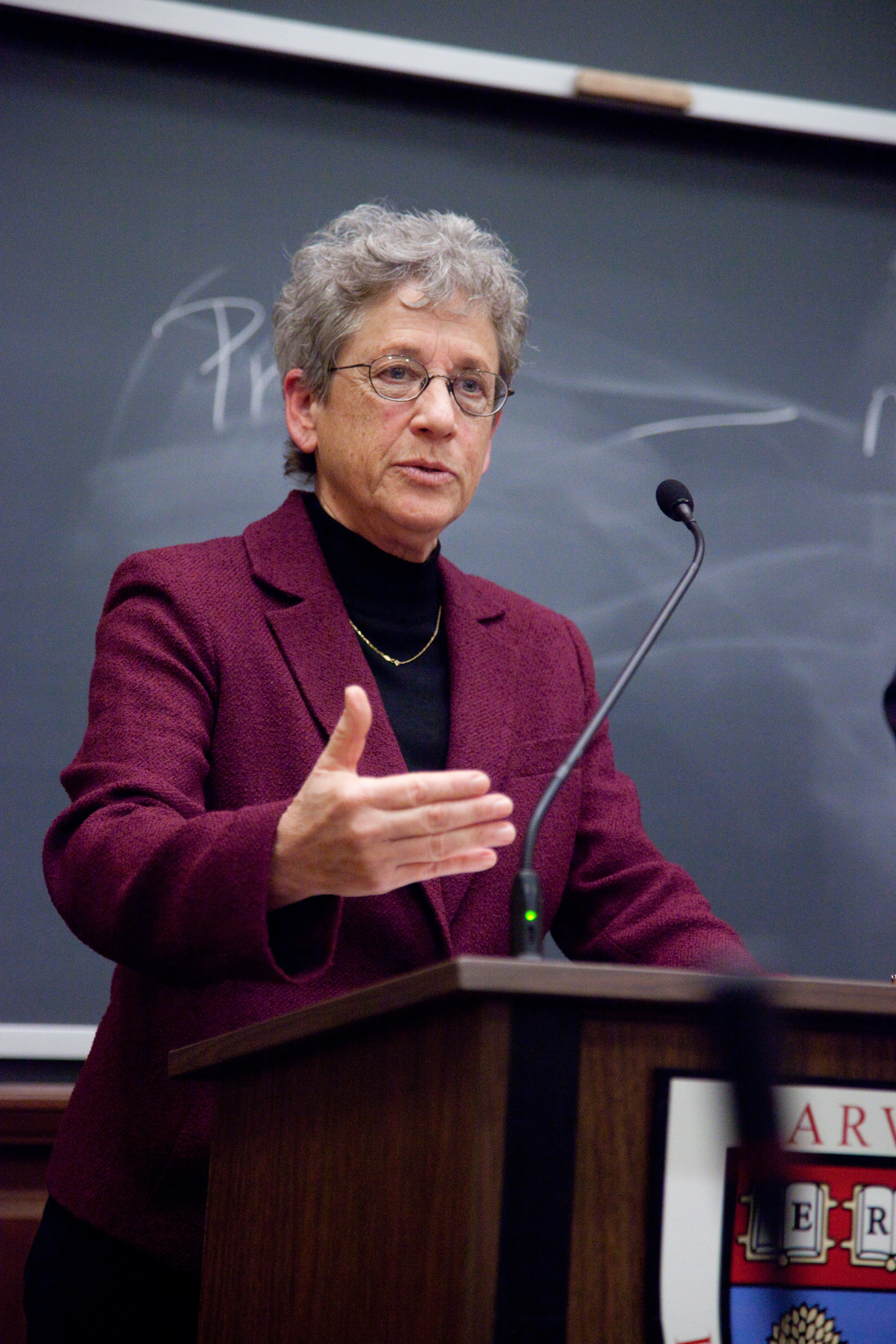
Barbara Herman lecturing at the Edmond J. Safra Center for Ethics

In a review of The Practice of Moral Judgment, Kant scholar Paul Guyer writes of Herman's work:

Herman succeeds in presenting an interpretation of Kant's ethics that shows it to be a powerful alternative to the empiricist utilitarian, neo-Aristotelian virtue ethics, and the post-modernist individualist or existentialist ethical theories which have enjoyed such prominence in recent years ... What [Herman] has given us is a deeply compelling picture of both the structure and power of Kant's regulative ideal of moral deliberation, and that is much to be grateful for indeed.

Of Herman's essay collection Moral Literacy, philosopher Stephen Darwall writes:

Rawls pointed out that it was one of Hegel's aims to overcome the many dualisms that he thought disfigured Kant's transcendental idealism. Herman's essays, in my view, are distinctive for this same emphasis. Throughout, she stresses continuities where more orthodox Kantian thought insists on separation. And she argues that Kant's central insights are not only preserved, but improved, when one appreciates these continuities. Thus, where orthodox Kantian thought sharply distinguishes desire from reason, love from reason, particular judgment from principle, and so on, Herman argues that these pairs should all be seen as continuous and interconnected and that a Kantian take on ethics is enhanced by so viewing them. She is tough-minded and rigorous, philosophically. And she doesn't waste words. Herman has an economy of expression and a penchant for illuminating philosophical coinage.

Legal theorist Lawrence Solum wrote on his blog:

In my opinion, Herman's recent work represents the very best of contemporary moral philosophy in the tradition of Kant—only a handful of scholars combine her deep appreciation of Kant, philosophical rigor, and genuine intellectual flexibility. A superb book. What I can I add to Darwall's high praise, except to say, "Highly Recommended!"

In 2014, Herman gave the Dewey Lectureship in Jurisprudence at the University of Chicago Law School, titled "The Moral Side of Non-Negligence."

== Bibliography ==
Books

- Kantian Commitments. Oxford: Oxford University Press, 2022
- The Moral Habitat. Oxford: Oxford University Press, 2021
- Moral Literacy. Harvard: Harvard University Press, 2007
- The Practice of Moral Judgement. Harvard: Harvard University Press, 1993

Articles

- "Doing Too Much," The Journal of Ethics, vol. 22, no. 2, March 2018, pp. 147–162.
- "Being Helped and Being Grateful: Imperfect Duties, the Ethics of Possession, and the Unity of Morality," Journal of Philosophy, June 2012.
- "A Mismatch of Methods," in Derek Parfit's On What Matters, Volume II, ed. Samuel Scheffler, Oxford University Press, 2011.
- "The Difference that Ends Make," in Perfecting Virtue: Kantian Ethics and Virtue Ethics, ed. Julian Wuerth and Lawrence Jost, Cambridge University Press, 2010.
- "Morality and Moral Theory," John Dewey Lecture, Proceedings and Addresses of the American Philosophical Association, Vol. 83, No. 2, November 2009.
- "A Habitat for Humanity," in Kant's Idea for A Universal History, eds. A. O Rorty and J. Schmidt, Cambridge University Press, 2009.
- "Contingency at Ground Level," in Moral Universalism and Pluralism, eds. Henry Richardson and Melissa Williams, NOMOS XLIX, NYU Press, 2008.
- "Morality Unbounded," Philosophy and Public Affairs, Fall 2008.
- "Reasoning to Obligation," Inquiry 49 no. 1 February 2006.
- "The Scope of Moral Requirement," Philosophy and Public Affairs, Summer 2001.
- "Bootstrapping," in Contours of Agency: Essays for Harry Frankfurt, eds. S. Buss & L. Overold (MIT Press, 2002).
- "Rethinking Kant's Hedonism," in Facts and Values: Essays for Judith Thomson, eds. R. Stalnaker, R. Wedgwood, & A. Byrne (MIT Press, 2001).
- "Morality and Everyday Life," in Proceedings of the American Philosophical Association, Nov. 2000.
- "Moral Literacy," in The Tanner Lectures on Human Value, volume 19 (University of Utah Press, 1998).
- "Training to Autonomy: Kant and the Question of Moral Education," in Philosophers on Education, ed.A. O. Rorty (Routledge, 1998).
- "A Cosmopolitan Kingdom of Ends," in Reclaiming the History of Ethics, eds. A. Reath, C. Korsgaard, & B. Herman (Cambridge University Press, 1997).
- "Making Room for Character," in Aristotle, Kant, and the Stoics, eds. S. Engstrom & J. Whiting, (Cambridge University Press, 1996).
- "Pluralism and the Community of Moral Judgment," in Toleration: An Elusive Virtue, ed. David Heyd (Princeton University Press, 1996).
- "Could It Be Worth Thinking About Kant on Sex and Marriage?" in A Mind of One's Own, eds. Louise Antony and Charlotte Witt, Westview Press, 1993.
