= Konstantin Pollok =

German philosopher

- Awards: NAKS Book Prize

Philosophical work
- Era: 21st-century philosophy
- Region: Western philosophy
- School: Kantian philosophy
- Institutions: Johannes Gutenberg University Mainz, University of South Carolina

Konstantin Pollok is a German philosopher and Professor of Modern Philosophy at the Johannes Gutenberg University Mainz. He is known for his works on Kantian philosophy and a winner of North American Kant Society Senior Scholar Book Prize.

== Books ==
- Kant’s Theory of Normativity: Exploring the Space of Reason, Cambridge: Cambridge University Press 2017
- Begründen und Rechtfertigen: Eine Untersuchung zum Verhältnis von rationalen Erfordernissen und prävalenten Handlungsgründen, Berlin / New York: De Gruyter 2009
- Kants Metaphysische Anfangsgründe der Naturwissenschaft: Ein Kritischer Kommentar, Hamburg: Meiner 2001
