= Marcus Willaschek =

German philosopher (born 1962)

Academic background
- Education: University of Münster, (PhD, habil.)
- Theses: Der mentale Zugang zur Welt. Realismus, Skeptizismus und Intentionalität (1999); Praktische Vernunft. Handlungstheorie und Moralbegründung bei Kant (1992)
- Doctoral advisor: Peter Rohs

Academic work
- Era: Contemporary philosophy
- Region: Western philosophy
- School or tradition: German Idealism
- Institutions: Goethe University Frankfurt
- Website: https://www.uni-frankfurt.de/49558019/Willaschek_Marcus

Marcus Willaschek (born 1962 in Arnsberg) is a German philosopher who is primarily concerned with the philosophy of Immanuel Kant as well as epistemology, theories of rationality and metaphysics.

== Life ==
Willaschek graduated from the Laurentianum grammar school in Arnsberg in 1982 and then studied philosophy with the minor subjects of biology, law and psychology at the University of Münster from 1984 to 1991. From 1988 to 1991, he received a scholarship from the German National Academic Foundation. In 1991, he received his doctorate in philosophy from the University of Münster under Peter Rohs. His dissertation was published in 1992 under the title Praktische Vernunft. Handlungstheorie und Moralbegründung bei Kant. His habilitation at the University of Münster followed in 1999. His habilitation thesis was published in 2003 under the title Der mentale Zugang zur Welt. Realismus, Skeptizismus und Intentionalität and republished in 2015.

In 2020, Willaschek received the Henry Allison Senior Scholar Prize from the North American Kant Society for his book Kant on the Sources of Metaphysics: The Dialectic of Pure Reason (Cambridge University Press, 2019). With his book Kant. Die Revolution des Denkens, Willaschek was nominated for the German Non-Fiction Prize (Deutscher Sachbuchpreis) in 2024.

== Memberships ==
From 2008 to 2016, he was also a member of the Philosophy Review Board of the German Research Foundation and from 2012 to 2017 of the extended board of the German Society for Philosophy. He has been a member of the Kant Commission of the Berlin-Brandenburg Academy of Sciences and Humanities (BBAW) since 2012, a full member of the academy since 2016 and Chairman of the Kant Commission since 2018.

== Writings (selection) ==
=== In English ===
- Willaschek, Marcus (2025). Lewis, Peter (ed.). Kant: A Revolution in Thinking. Harvard University Press. doi:10.4159/9780674301887. ISBN 978-0-674-30188-7.
- Kant on the Sources of Metaphysics: The Dialectic of Pure Reason, Cambridge University Press, Cambridge 2018, ISBN 978-1-108-47263-0.

=== In German ===
- Praktische Vernunft: Handlungstheorie und Moralbegründung bei Kant. Verlag J.B. Metzler, Stuttgart 1992, ISBN 978-3-476-00864-0. (Online)
- Realismus. Schöningh, Paderborn 2000, ISBN 978-3-506-99511-7.
- Der mentale Zugang zur Welt: Realismus, Skeptizismus und Intentionalität. Klostermann, Frankfurt am Main 2015 (2. Aufl.), ISBN 978-3-465-04233-4.
- Kant-Lexikon, 3 Bände, (hrsg. mit G. Mohr, J. Stolzenberg und St. Bacin). de Gruyter, Berlin/New York 2015, ISBN 978-3-110-17259-1.
- Kant. Die Revolution des Denkens. C.H. Beck, München 2023, ISBN 978-3-406-80743-5.
