= Melissa Merritt =

American philosopher

- Awards: NAKS Book Prize

Education
- Education: Yale University (BA); University of Pittsburgh (PhD)
- Thesis: Drawing from the sources of reason: Reflective self-knowledge in Kant's first Critique (2004)
- Doctoral advisor: Stephen Engstrom

Philosophical work
- Era: 21st-century philosophy
- Region: Western philosophy
- Institutions: University of New South Wales
- Main interests: Kantian philosophy

Melissa McBay Merritt is an American philosopher and academic who works in Australia as an associate professor at the University of New South Wales. She is known for her works on Kantian philosophy.

Merritt has a 1994 bachelor's degree from Yale University, and completed her Ph.D. in 2004 at the University of Pittsburgh. Her dissertation, Drawing from the sources of reason: Reflective self-knowledge in Kant's first Critique, was directed by Stephen Engstrom. She is a winner of the North American Kant Society Book Prize and the Annette Baier Essay Prize of the Australasian Association of Philosophy.

== Books ==
- Kant on Reflection and Virtue, Cambridge University Press 2018
- The Sublime, Elements in the Philosophy of Immanuel Kant, Cambridge University Press 2018
- Kant and Stoic Ethics, Cambridge University Press 2025
- Kant's Transformation of Stoic Philosophy, Cambridge University Press 2026
