= Sergio Tenenbaum =

Canadian philosopher

- Born: May 25, 1964 (age 62); Rio de Janeiro, Brazil

Education
- Education: University of Pittsburgh

Philosophical work
- Era: 21st-century philosophy
- Region: Western philosophy
- Institutions: University of Toronto
- Notable students: Helga Varden
- Main interests: moral psychology
- Website: https://www.sergiotenenbaum.org/

Sergio Tenenbaum (born May 25, 1964) is a Brazilian-born Canadian philosopher and professor of philosophy at the University of Toronto Mississauga. He is known for his works on moral psychology and theory of action.

In 2026, he was elected as a fellow of the Royal Society of Canada.

== Books ==
- Appearances of the Good (Cambridge, 2007)
- Moral Psychology (Rodopi, 2007), ed.
- Desire, Practical Reason, and the Good (Oxford, 2010), ed.
- Rational Powers in Action (Oxford, 2020)
