= Ken Gemes =

Philosopher

Philosophical work
- Era: 20th-century philosophy
- Region: Western Philosophy
- School: analytic philosophy
- Main interests: Logic; Nietzsche

Ken Gemes is Professor Emeritus of Philosophy at Birkbeck, University of London and is currently Visiting Professor of Philosophy at King's College London. His primary interests are Nietzsche and philosophy of science.

== Education and career ==
Gemes earned his PhD from the University of Pittsburgh in 1990 with a dissertation in philosophy of science working with Clark Glymour and Wesley Salmon. He taught at Yale University for ten years before moving to Birkbeck in 2000. Gemes retired from Birkbeck in 2023 following the restructuring of the College and the dissolution of the Department of Philosophy, with the remaining Philosophy staff being merged into the wider School of Historical Studies. Gemes has retained a Visiting Professorship at King's College London since.

== Philosophical work ==
Gemes's work has covered a wide range of philosophical issues. This includes technical concerns of logical content and methodologies with the philosophy of science.

His recent research on Nietzsche has concerned the exploration of Nietzsche's assertion that 'we', namely the inheritors of the Enlightenment project in the advent of modernity, remain 'strangers to ourselves'. He has explored this through a series of papers on the true targets of Nietzsche's critiques, such as his references to 'slaves', 'Christians', and the rhetorical role that degeneration (Entartung) plays in Nietzsche's works. This relates to Nietzsche's account of philosophy as the "last manifestation of the ascetic ideal".

== Selected publications ==
- The Oxford Handbook of Nietzsche, Ken Gemes and John Richardson, eds. Oxford University Press, 2013
- Nietzsche on Freedom and Autonomy, Ken Gemes and Simon May eds., Oxford University Press, 2009
- Gemes, Ken (1992), Nietzsche's Critique of Truth, Philosophy and Phenomenological Research, Vol. 52, No. 1, March 1992, pp. 47–65
- Gemes, Ken (1993), Hypothetico-Deductivism, Content, and the Natural Axiomatization of Theories, Philosophy of Science, Vol. 60, No. 3 Sep., pp. 477–487
- "Hypothetico-deductivism, content, and the natural axiomatization of theories" in Philosophy of Science, 1993
- "A new theory of content I: Basic content," in Journal of Philosophical Logic, 1994
- "Hypothetico-deductivism: the current state of play; the criterion of empirical significance: endgame" in Erkenntnis 1998
- "Horwich, Hempel, and Hypothetico-Deductivism" in Philosophy of Science, 1990
- "The indeterminacy thesis reformulated" Journal of Philosophy, 1991
- " Verisimilitude and content" in Synthese, 2007
- "The world in itself: Neither uniform nor physical" in Synthese, 1987
- "Hypothetico-deductivism: incomplete but not hopeless," in Erkenntnis 2005
- "Content & Watkins's Account of Natural Axiomatizations" in Dialectica 2006
- "Naturalism and Value in Nietzsche" in Philosophy and Phenomenonological Research, 2005
- "Schurz on hypothetico-deductivism" in Erkenntnis, 1994
- "Inductive Skepticism and the Probability Calculus I: Popper and Jeffreys on Induction and the Probability of Law-Like Universal Generalizations" in Philosophy of Science 1997
- "Nihilism and the Affirmation of Life: A Review of and Dialogue with Bernard Reginster" in European Journal of Philosophy
- "A refutation of global scepticism" in Analysis 2009
- "Bootstrapping and Content Parts" in Erkenntnis 2006
- "Irrelevance: Strengthening the Bayesian Requirements" in Synthese, 2007
- "Nietzsche on free will, autonomy and the sovereign individual" in Proceedings of the Aristotelian Society 2006
- "Postmodernism's use and abuse of Nietzsche" in Philosophy and Phenomenological Research 2001
- "A new theory of content II: Model theory and some alternatives" Journal of Philosophical Logic 1997
- "Life's Perspectives" in The Oxford Handbook of Nietzsche 2013
