= Gopal Sreenivasan =

Canadian philosopher

Education
- Education: University of California, Berkeley (PhD), University of Oxford (BPhil), McGill University (BA)

Philosophical work
- Institutions: Duke University
- Main interests: ethics, political philosophy

Gopal Sreenivasan is a Canadian philosopher and Crown University Distinguished Professor in Ethics at Duke University. He is known for his works on ethics and political philosophy.

== Books ==
- Emotion and virtue (Princeton, 2020)
- The Limits of Lockean Rights in Property (Oxford, 1995)
