= Robert Hopkins (philosopher) =

British philosopher (born 1964)

- Born: 1964 (age 61–62)
- Awards: Philip Leverhulme Prize

Education
- Education: University of Cambridge (BA, PhD), University College London (MPhil)

Philosophical work
- Era: 21st-century philosophy
- Region: Western philosophy
- Institutions: New York University
- Main interests: philosophy of art, philosophy of mind

Robert Hopkins (born 1964) is a British philosopher and Professor of Philosophy at New York University. He is known for his works on philosophy of art.

== Books ==
- Picture, Image and Experience: A Philosophical Inquiry, Cambridge University Press 1998
