= Howard Lloyd Williams =

Welsh political scientist and philosopher

Howard Williams FLSW
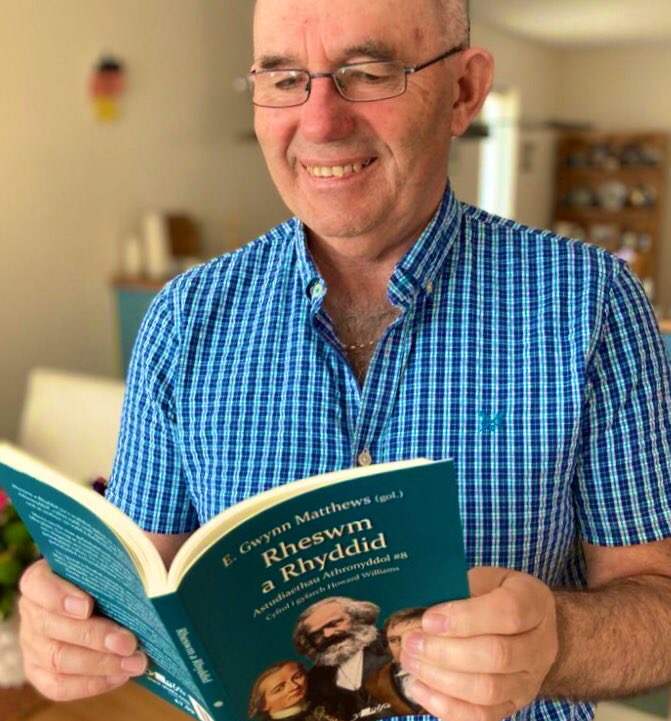
- Born: 23 March 1950 (age 76)
- Spouse: Jennifer Williams

Education
- Education: University College London
- Doctoral advisor: Henry Tudor

Philosophical work
- Era: Contemporary philosophy
- Region: Western philosophy
- School: Continental philosophy
- Institutions: Cardiff University
- Main interests: Kantian philosophy
- Website: https://blog.apaonline.org/2018/05/11/apa-member-interview-howard-williams/

Howard Williams (born 1950) is a Welsh political philosopher and Honorary Distinguished Professor at Cardiff University.

He is known for his works on German philosophy, political philosophy, political and international political theory. Most notably, he has written important contributions to the history of political thought of Immanuel Kant, Georg Hegel and Karl Marx.

Howard Williams was appointed Honorary Distinguished Professor at Cardiff University in 2014. He is also Emeritus Professor in Political Theory at the Department of International Politics, Aberystwyth University, and member of the Coleg Cymraeg Cenedlaethol (the Welsh-language national college).

He has been visiting professor, Department of Philosophy, Halle University, Germany, 1998–1999; visiting scholar, Dept of Philosophy, Wilfrid Laurier University, Waterloo, Ontario, Canada 1998; Visiting DAAD Fellow, Humboldt University, Berlin, 2002; Visiting professor, Krakow University 2006. In 2004 and 2006 he was a visiting scholar at the Department of Philosophy, Stanford University. In 2010 he gave the Paton lectures at the Department of Philosophy, St. Andrews University and was a principal guest speaker at the 30th Anniversary conference of the Danish Philosophical Forum. In June 2014 he was a visiting scholar at the University of Oslo contributing to a joint project of the Philosophy and Law Departments on International Courts and International Legal Theory.

He has been commissioned by Oxford University Press to write a book on the Kantian Legacy in Political Philosophy in a series edited by Paul Guyer at Brown University, Rhode Island.

Currently, Howard Williams is editing The Palgrave Handbook of International Political Theory.

He was elected a Fellow of the Learned Society of Wales in 2017.

He is a member of Glamorgan County Cricket Club and is an avid attendee of Cymru's home football games at the Cardiff City Stadium.

== Books ==
- Marx (1980) Gwasg Gee, Denbigh.
- Kant's Political Philosophy (1983) Basil Blackwell, Oxford / St Martin's Press, New York.
- Concepts of Ideology (1988) Harvester Wheatsheaf, Brighton / St. Martin’s Press, New York.
- Hegel, Heraclitus and Marx's Dialectic (1989) Harvester, Hemel Hempstead / St. Martin’s Press, New York.
- International Relations in Political Theory (1992) Open University Press, Buckingham and Philadelphia.
- Essays on Kant's Political Philosophy (ed.) (1992) Macmillan, London / St. Martin's Press, New York.
- International Relations and the Limits of Political Theory (1996) Macmillan, London / St. Martin's Press, New York.
- Kant's Critique of Hobbes: Sovereignty and Cosmopolitanism (2003) University of Wales Press, Cardiff.
- Kant and the End of War (2012) Palgrave Macmillan, Houndmills / New York.
- Francis Fukuyama and the End of History with David Sullivan & E. Gwynn Matthews (1997) University of Wales Press, Cardiff / Boston.
- Essays on Kant’s Political Philosophy, edited by Howard Williams (1992) University of Wales Press, Cardiff / University of Chicago Press.
- A Reader in International Relations and Political Theory, edited by Howard Williams, Moorhead Wright & Tony Evans (1993) Open University Press, Buckingham / University of British Columbia Press.
- Political Thought and German Reunification, edited by Howard Williams, Colin Wight & Norbert Kapferer (1999) Macmillan, London /St. Martin’s Press, New York.
- Politics and Metaphysics in Kant, edited by Sorin Baiasu, Howard Williams & Sami Pihlström (2011) University of Wales Press, Cardiff.
