= Julian Wuerth =

American philosopher

- Awards: NAKS Book Prize

Education
- Education: University of Pennsylvania (PhD), University of Chicago (BA)

Philosophical work
- Era: 21st-century philosophy
- Region: Western philosophy
- School: Kantian philosophy
- Institutions: Vanderbilt University

Julian Wuerth is an American philosopher and Chair and Associate Professor in the Department of Philosophy at Vanderbilt University. He is known for his works on Kantian philosophy and a winner of North American Kant Society Senior Scholar Book Prize.

== Books ==
- The Cambridge Kant Lexicon (Cambridge University Press, 2021)
- Kant on Mind, Action, and Ethics (Oxford University Press, 2014)
- Perfecting Virtue: New Essays on Kant’s Ethics and Virtue Ethics, eds. Lawrence Jost and Julian Wuerth (Cambridge University Press, 2011)
