= Journal of Moral Philosophy =

- Discipline: Philosophy
- Language: English
- Edited by: S. Matthew Liao

Publication details
- History: 2004–present
- Publisher: Brill Publishers (International)
- Frequency: Bimonthly
- Open access: Hybrid
- Impact factor: 0.379 (2015)

Standard abbreviations
- ISO 4: J. Moral Philos.

Indexing
- ISSN: 1740-4681 (print); 1745-5243 (web)

Links
- Journal homepage

The Journal of Moral Philosophy is a peer-reviewed journal of moral, political, and legal philosophy with an international focus. It publishes articles in all areas of normative philosophy, including pure and applied ethics, as well as moral, legal, and political theory. Articles exploring non-Western traditions are also welcome.

The Journal seeks to promote lively discussions and debates for established academics and the wider community, by publishing articles that avoid unnecessary jargon without sacrificing academic rigour. It encourages contributions from newer members of the philosophical community. One issue per year is normally devoted to a particular theme and each issue will contain articles, discussion pieces, review essays, and book reviews. The founding editor was Thom Brooks (2003–2012).

According to the Journal Citation Reports, the journal has a 2015 impact factor of 0.379, ranking it 42nd out of 51 journals in the category "Ethics".

== See also ==
- List of ethics journals
- List of philosophy journals
- List of political science journals
