= Don Garrett =

American philosopher

Education
- Education: Yale University (PhD)

Philosophical work
- Era: 21st-century philosophy
- Region: Western philosophy
- Institutions: New York University, University of North Carolina at Chapel Hill
- Main interests: early modern philosophy

Don Garrett is an American philosopher and Silver Professor and professor of philosophy at the New York University. He is known for his work on early modern philosophy. Previously Garrett was Kenan Distinguished Professor for Teaching Excellence at the University of North Carolina at Chapel Hill and has served as co-editor of Hume Studies.

== Books ==
- Nature and Necessity in Spinoza’s Philosophy (Oxford University Press, 2018)
- Hume (Routledge, 2015)
- Cognition and Commitment in Hume’s Philosophy (Oxford University Press, 1997)
- The Cambridge Companion to Spinoza (ed.) (Cambridge University Press, 1996)
