= Sophia Moreau =

American philosopher

Sophia Reibetanz Moreau
- Born: 1972 (age 53–54)

Philosophical work
- Era: 21st-century philosophy
- Region: Western philosophy
- Institutions: University of Toronto, New York University
- Notable students: Helga Varden

Sophia Reibetanz Moreau (born 1972) is a Canadian philosopher and the Samuel Tilden Professor of Law and Philosophy at New York University. She is known for her works on inequality and discrimination.

== Books ==
- Faces of Inequality: A Theory of Wrongful Discrimination, Oxford University Press 2020
