= Richard E. Aquila =

American philosopher

Richard E. Aquila (born 1944) is an American philosopher, currently the co-editor of Kantian Review (a journal focusing on Immanuel Kant) and formerly a Distinguished Humanities Professor at University of Tennessee. He is known for his "two object" (or "two world") interpretation of Kant's transcendental idealism.

== Books ==
- Intentionality: A Study of Mental Acts, Pennsylvania State University Press, 1976.
- Representational Mind: A Study of Kant's Theory of Knowledge, Indiana University Press, 1983.
- Arthur Schopenhauer, The World as Will and Presentation, trans. Richard E. Aquila in collaboration with David Carus, New York: Longman, 2008.
