= J. David Velleman =

American philosopher (born 1952)

- Born: James David Velleman; 1952 (age 73–74)

Education
- Education: Princeton University
- Doctoral advisor: David Lewis

Philosophical work
- Era: Contemporary philosophy
- Region: Western philosophy
- School: Analytic; Constitutivism
- Main interests: Ethics, philosophy of action
- Notable ideas: Constitutivism

James David Velleman (born 1952) is an American philosopher. He is Emeritus Professor of Philosophy and Bioethics at New York University and Miller Research Professor of Philosophy at Johns Hopkins University. He primarily works in the areas of ethics, moral psychology, and related areas such as the philosophy of action, and practical reasoning.

== Education and career ==
Velleman received his Ph.D. from Princeton University in 1983 under the supervision of David K. Lewis. He taught previously for more than twenty years at the University of Michigan before moving to NYU.

He has received fellowships from the National Endowment for the Humanities and the Guggenheim Foundation. He is founding co-editor with Stephen Darwall of Philosophers' Imprint, an on-line, peer-refereed philosophy journal. Several of his former students are now established philosophers, including Connie Rosati at the University of Texas, Austin and Nishiten Shah at Amherst College.

== Philosophical work ==
Velleman is a defender of constitutivism in ethics, arguing that moral standards arise from the nature of action.

== Publications ==
=== Books ===
- Practical Reflection (Princeton University Press, 1989)
- Self to Self (Cambridge University Press, 2006)
- How We Get Along (Cambridge University Press, 2009)
- Foundations for Moral Relativism (Open Book Publishers, 2013)
- Konrad Morgen: The Conscience of a Nazi Judge (with Herlinde Pauer-Studer) (Palgrave Macmillan, 2015) ISBN 978-1-137-49695-9
- The Possibility of Practical Reason (Second Edition, Maize Books, 2015)
- Beyond Price: Essays on Life and Death (Open Book Publishers, 2015)

=== Selected articles ===
- (1985) "Practical Reflection" Philosophical Review 94(1):33–61.
- (1989) "Colour as a Secondary Quality" Mind XCVIII(389):81–103. [co-authored with Paul Boghossian]
- (1992) "What Happens When Someone Acts?" Mind 101(403):461–481.
- (1992) "The Guise of the Good" Noûs 26(1):3–26.
- (1999) "Love as a Moral Emotion" in Ethics 109, N° 2(January 1999):338–374.

=== Interviews ===
- 'Really Seeing Another' in Alex Voorhoeve, Conversations on Ethics Oxford University Press, 2009. ISBN 978-0-19-921537-9. (A conversation about Velleman's views on love and its relation to morality.)
- Five Questions By Kieran Setiya, a podcast episode.

== See also ==
- American philosophy
- Collective intentionality
- List of American philosophers
- New York University Department of Philosophy
