= Lewis Frumkes =

American educator, humorist and writer

Lewis Frumkes is an American educator, humorist and writer. He was born in Brooklyn, New York and attended a number of institutions such as New York University, Trinity College, Columbia University, and Pace University. He earned his B.A. and master's degree in English and philosophy from New York University

Frumkes currently sits on the editorial board of The Writer Magazine and holds memberships with the American Society of Journalists and Authors, the National Association of Science Writers, the Authors Guild, Harvard Club of New York, Mensa, the Authors League of America, and P.E.N.

== Career ==
Frumkes first worked on Wall Street as a runner and bodyguard, then became a free-lance writer in 1976, publishing articles for magazines and papers such as Harper's, The New York Times, Cosmopolitan and Harper's Bazaar. Starting in 1986 he joined the faculty at Marymount Manhattan College teaching honors critical thinking and was appointed President's Distinguished Visiting Lecturer. In 1988, Frumkes began teaching at Harvard University. That same year, he began hosting the Lewis Burke Frumkes Show on WNWK in New York City. The show eventually moved to WPAT where it continues to air. In 2011 Frumkes transferred to Hunter College in New York City where he became Director of The Writing Center CE. In 2018 Hunter College renamed The Writing Center in his honor, “The Lewis Burke Frumkes Center For Writing And Culture."

== Selected bibliography ==
- Wall Street Laid Bear (1970)
- How to Raise Your I.Q. by Eating Gifted Children (1983)
- Name Crazy (1986)
- The Mensa Think Smart Book (with Abbie Salny) (1986)
- Manhattan Cocktail (1989)
- Favorite Words of Famous People (2011)
- Metapunctuation (1993)
- The Logophile's Orgy: Favorite Words of Famous People (1995)
- Advice for Young Writers (2015)

== Personal life ==
Frumkes married Alana Martin on June 25, 1966.
