= Kantian Review =

- Discipline: Philosophy
- Language: English
- Edited by: Howard Lloyd Williams, Richard E. Aquila

Publication details
- History: 1997–present
- Publisher: Cambridge University Press (United Kingdom)
- Frequency: Triannual

Standard abbreviations
- ISO 4: Kantian Rev.

Indexing
- ISSN: 1369-4154 (print); 2044-2394 (web)

Links
- Journal homepage; Online archive

Kantian Review is a journal of philosophy, focusing on Immanuel Kant which publishes articles and reviews selected for their quality and relevance to current philosophical debate in relation to Kant's work. It was first published in March 1997 under editor Graham Bird of the University of Manchester. Howard Lloyd Williams of Aberystwyth, & Cardiff University and Richard E. Aquila are currently responsible for Kantian Review.

== See also ==
- List of philosophy journals
