= Philosophers' Imprint =

- Discipline: Philosophy
- Language: English
- Edited by: Brian Weatherson

Publication details
- History: 2001–present
- Publisher: Michigan Publishing (U.S.)
- Frequency: Irregular
- Open access: Yes
- License: CC-BY-NC-ND

Standard abbreviations
- ISO 4: Philos.' Impr.

Indexing
- ISSN: 1533-628X
- LCCN: 2001-212257
- OCLC no.: 45826937

Links
- Journal homepage

Philosophers' Imprint is a refereed philosophy journal.

The journal was launched by University of Michigan Philosophy professors Stephen Darwall (now at Yale University) and J. David Velleman (now at New York University and Johns Hopkins University). In 2000, a year before the Budapest Open Access Initiative conference promoted open-access more widely, Darwall and Velleman approached Michigan's librarians with the goal of starting a small revolution in academic philosophy publishing. They hoped that publishing philosophical research online could significantly reduce the amount of time between submission and publication from what was then typical in professional journals. The university's librarians, incentivized by the rising costs of subscribing to academic journals, in turn drew on their expertise in managing digital content to collaborate with the editors to produce a journal from within the library, calling the resulting operation The Scholarly Publishing Office. The editors of Philosophers' Imprint recognized that by publishing an academic journal online, they could also make research available to everyone with internet access, "including students and teachers in developing countries, as well as members of the general public."

Originally edited by Darwall and Velleman, Philosophers' Imprint is now edited by Brian Weatherson leading a team of thirteen philosophers and advised by an international editorial board. The journal consistently ranked in the top ten of all general philosophy journals in an recurrent poll between academic philosophers.
