= Philosophical Studies =

Peer-reviewed academic journal by Springer Nature

- Discipline: Philosophy
- Language: English
- Edited by: Wayne Davis; Jennifer Lackey

Publication details
- History: 1950–present
- Publisher: Springer
- Frequency: 12/year

Standard abbreviations
- ISO 4: Philos. Stud.

Indexing
- CODEN: PLSDA3
- ISSN: 0031-8116 (print); 1573-0883 (web)
- LCCN: 52062286
- JSTOR: 00318116
- OCLC no.: 01490601

Links
- Journal homepage

Philosophical Studies is a peer-reviewed academic journal for philosophy in the analytic tradition. The journal is devoted to the publication of papers in exclusively analytic philosophy and welcomes papers applying formal techniques to philosophical problems. It was established in 1950 by Herbert Feigl and Wilfrid Sellars. Starting in 1972, publication was assumed by D. Reidel. It is currently published by Springer, a corporate heir of D. Reidel.

== Abstracting and indexing ==
The journal is abstracted and indexed in Academic OneFile, Academic Search, Arts & Humanities Citation Index, ProQuest, Current Contents/Arts and Humanities, EBSCO databases, FRANCIS, International Bibliography of Periodical Literature, Mathematical Reviews, MLA International Bibliography, Scopus, Summon by Serial Solutions, and The Philosopher's Index. The journal ranked in the top ten of all general philosophy journals in an unscientific poll of philosophers conducted in 2012. It also ranked in the top ten in a later unscientific poll of philosophers ranking general and specialist journals together that was conducted in 2013.

== See also ==
- List of philosophy journals
