= Redundancy theory of truth =

Philosophical concept

According to the redundancy theory of truth (also known as the disquotational theory of truth), asserting that a statement is true is completely equivalent to asserting the statement itself. For example, asserting the sentence "'Snow is white' is true" is equivalent to asserting the sentence "Snow is white". The philosophical redundancy theory of truth is a deflationary theory of truth.

== Overview ==
Redundancy theorists infer from this premise that truth is a redundant concept—in other words, that "truth" is merely a word that it is conventional to use in certain contexts but not one that points to anything in reality. The theory is commonly attributed to Frank P. Ramsey, who argued that the use of words like fact and truth was nothing but a roundabout way of asserting a proposition, and that treating these words as separate problems in isolation from judgment was merely a "linguistic muddle", though there remains some debate as to the correct interpretation of his position (Le Morvan 2004).

Redundancy theorists begin by inquiring into the function of the predicate "__is true" in sentences like "'Snow is white' is true". They reason that asserting the longer sentence is equivalent to asserting the shorter sentence "Snow is white". From this they infer that nothing is added to the assertion of the sentence "Snow is white" by quoting it, appending the predicate "__is true", and then asserting the result.

Most predicates attribute properties to their subjects, but the redundancy theory denies that the predicate is true does so. Instead, it treats the predicate is true as empty, adding nothing to an assertion except to convert its use to its mention. That is, the predicate "___is true" merely asserts the proposition contained in the sentential clause to which it is applied but does not ascribe any additional property to that proposition or sentence, and in Ramsey's British lexicon, "is true" is redundant. Hence, redundancy theory of truth claims that the whole issue of truth is an illusion, caused by our use of the predicate..."is true" which allegedly is redundant, i.e without meaning.

== Precursors ==
Gottlob Frege was probably the first philosophical logician to express something very close to the idea that the predicate "is true" does not express anything above and beyond the statement to which it is attributed. In 1892, he wrote:

One can, indeed, say: "The thought that 5 is a prime number is true." But closer examination shows that nothing more has been said than in the simple sentence "5 is a prime number." The truth claim arises in each case from the form of the declarative sentence, and when the latter lacks its usual force, e.g., in the mouth of an actor upon the stage, even the sentence "The thought that 5 is a prime number is true" contains only a thought, and indeed the same thought as the simple "5 is a prime number."

In 1918, he argued:

It is worthy of notice that the sentence "I smell the scent of violets" has the same content as the sentence "it is true that I smell the scent of violets". So it seems, then, that nothing is added to the thought by my ascribing to it the property of truth.

== Ramsey's approach ==
Ramsey's paper "Facts and Propositions" (1927) is frequently cited as the precipitating contribution to the current of thought that came to be called the redundancy theory of truth. He wrote, "But before we proceed further with the analysis of judgment, it is necessary to say something about truth and falsehood, in order to show that there is really no separate problem of truth but merely a linguistic muddle" (p. 38).

Starting in a context of discussion that is concerned with analyzing judgment, in effect, the matter of asserting or denying propositions, Ramsey turns to the question of truth and falsehood, and suggests that these words add nothing of substance to the analysis of judgment already in progress:

Truth and falsity are ascribed primarily to propositions. The proposition to which they are ascribed may be either explicitly given or described.

Suppose first that it is explicitly given; then it is evident that 'It is true that Caesar was murdered' means no more than that Caesar was murdered, and 'It is false that Caesar was murdered' means that Caesar was not murdered.

In the course of his argument, Ramsey observes that there are many different ways of asserting what is really the same proposition, at least so far as the abstract logical meanings of sentences are concerned. In his first examples, he uses the verbal forms (1) 'It is true that ___' and (2) 'It is false that ___', for the sake of concreteness filling in the blanks with the sentential clause 'Caesar was murdered'. He says that assertions mediated by these forms are not distinct in meaning from the corresponding direct assertions.

They are phrases we sometimes use for emphasis or for stylistic reasons, or to indicate the position occupied by the statement in our argument.

So also we can say 'It is a fact that he was murdered' or 'That he was murdered is contrary to fact'.

In the same context and by the same token, Ramsey cites the verbal forms (3) 'It is a fact that ___' and (4) '___ is contrary to fact' as further examples of dispensable, otiose, redundant, or purely stylistic verbiage.

In the second case in which the proposition is described and not given explicitly we have perhaps more of a problem, for we get statements from which we cannot in ordinary language eliminate the words 'true' and 'false'.

The strategy of Ramsey's argument is to demonstrate that certain figures of speech—those in which truth and falsehood seem to figure as real properties of propositions, or as logical values that constitute real objects, however abstract, of discussion and thought—can always be eliminated in favor of paraphrases that do not reify truth and falsehood as nouns, or even use true and false as adjectives. The plausibility of this tactic is fairly evident in the case of verbal forms that introduce direct or indirect quotations, but its feasibility is less clear in the case of propositions whose contents are not given in full, but only by indirect or partial description.

Thus if I say 'He is always right', I mean that the propositions he asserts are always true, and there does not seem to be any way of expressing this without using the word 'true'.

But suppose we put it thus 'For all p, if he asserts p, p is true', then we see that the propositional function p is true is simply the same as p, as e.g. its value 'Caesar was murdered is true' is the same as 'Caesar was murdered'.

The type of propositional function that Ramsey is referring to here is a function that takes a proposition as input and gives a proposition as output. In this case, the propositional function of interest is one that takes any proposition p and returns a proposition of the form 'p is true'.

We have in English to add 'is true' to give the sentence a verb, forgetting that ' p ' already contains a (variable) verb.

This may be made clearer by supposing for a moment that only one form of proposition is in question, say the relational form aRb; then 'He is always right' could be expressed by 'For all a, R, b, if he asserts aRb, then aRb ', to which 'is true' would be an obviously superfluous addition.

When all forms of proposition are included the analysis is more complicated but not essentially different; and it is clear that the problem is not as to the nature of truth and falsehood, but as to the nature of judgment or assertion, for what is difficult to analyse in the above formulation is 'He asserts aRb '.

It is, perhaps, also immediately obvious that if we have analysed judgment we have solved the problem of truth; for taking the mental factor in a judgment (which is often itself called a judgment), the truth or falsity of this depends only on what proposition it is that is judged, and what we have to explain is the meaning of saying that the judgment is a judgment that a has R to b, i.e. is true if aRb, false if not. We can, if we like, say that it is true if there exists a corresponding fact that a has R to b, but this is essentially not an analysis but a periphrasis, for 'The fact that a has R to b exists' is no different from ' a has R to b '.

== Variants ==
A variant of redundancy theory is the disquotational theory, which uses a modified form of Tarski's T-schema: To say that "'P' is true" is to say that P. Yet another version of deflationism is the prosentential theory of truth, first developed by Dorothy Grover, Joseph Camp, and Nuel Belnap as an elaboration of Ramsey's claims. They argue that sentences like "That's true", when said in response to "It's raining", are prosentences (see pro-form), expressions that merely repeat the content of other expressions. In the same way that it means the same as my dog in the sentence My dog was hungry, so I fed it, That's true is supposed to mean the same as It's raining—if you say the latter and I then say the former. These variations do not necessarily follow Ramsey in asserting that truth is not a property, but rather can be understood to say that, for instance, the assertion "P" may well involve a substantial truth, and the theorists in this case are minimalizing only the redundancy or prosentence involved in the statement such as "that's true."

Proponents of pragmatic, constructivist and consensus theories would differ with all these conclusions, however, and instead assert that the second person making the statement "that's true" is actually participating in further verifying, constructing and/or achieving consensus on the proposed truth of the matter—e.g., the proposition that "it's raining".

Redundancy theory does not apply to representations that are not analogous to sentences and they do not apply to many other things that are commonly judged to be true or otherwise. Consider the analogy between the sentence "Snow is white" and the person Snow White, both of which can be true in a sense. To say "'Snow is white' is true" is to say "Snow is white", but to say "Snow White is true" is, obviously, not to say "Snow White."

== See also ==
- Coherentism
- Confirmation holism
- Disquotational principle
- Truth
- Truth theory

=== Related topics ===
- Belief
- Epistemology
- Information
- Inquiry
- Knowledge
- Pragmatism
- Pragmaticism
- Pragmatic maxim
- Reproducibility
- Scientific method
- Testability
- Verificationism
