= Truth =

Conformity to reality

Truth is commonly understood as conformity to reality or fact. It contrasts with falsity or misrepresentation that fails to align with the world. Truth is typically treated as a property of sentences, propositions, or beliefs that describe things as they are. It is closely related to truthfulness, a virtue associated with honesty, and to truthlikeness, a characteristic of theories that approximate the truth.

Various theories of the nature of truth have been proposed, but its precise definition remains contested. The correspondence theory holds that a statement is true if it corresponds to facts. According to the coherence theory, a belief is true if it is consistent with other beliefs and supported by them. Pragmatists understand truth based on practical consequences and inquiry, claiming that truth is what works or what would withstand the test of unlimited inquiry. The semantic theory analyzes truth in terms of the conditions under which a sentence would be true. Deflationary theories argue that truth has no significant intrinsic nature, holding that to understand the concept of truth is merely to understand the linguistic role of the word true and similar expressions. Pluralists assert that the definition of truth varies with the domain of analysis, while relativists maintain that the same statement can be true in one perspective and false in another. Theories of truth are challenged by logical paradoxes, such as the liar paradox. There are also discussions about the existence of additional truth values besides true and false and about the possibility of truth value gaps—statements that have no truth value.

Philosophers distinguish types of truth by domain, content, and epistemic access, including a priori, necessary, moral, aesthetic, religious, and scientific truths. Truth plays a central role in the sciences as a goal of inquiry. The empirical sciences seek truth through observation and experimentation, whereas the formal sciences rely on deductive reasoning from fundamental principles. Many religious traditions regard truth as a virtue and ground it in a divine source. Truth also acts as a guiding norm in the fields of ethics, law, and journalism.

Discussions of truth arose in antiquity in Hindu, Jain, Buddhist, and Greek thought. In the medieval period, Christian and Islamic philosophers explored the relation between truth and God. Discussions in the modern and contemporary periods have addressed diverse topics, such as the nature of truth and its relation to thought, language, and reality.

== Definition ==
Truth is commonly treated as conformity to facts or accordance with reality. It is often understood as a property of statements or beliefs that present the world as it is, or as a relation between language or thought and how things actually are. However, its precise definition is disputed, with different theories focusing on elements such as correspondence, coherence, or practical usefulness. In a slightly different sense, the term can also refer to genuineness, as in "a true friend"; spiritual teachings, like "the truth of the scriptures"; or facts themselves, such as "in truth, the product was defective". Truth contrasts with falsehood or falsity, which encompasses misrepresentations that do not meet this standard and fail to align with reality. The negation of a true statement is a falsehood.

Truth plays a central role in many human endeavors. It acts as a goal of inquiry when deciding what to believe and as a standard for right conduct by being responsive to how things actually are. People refer to truth to indicate reliable information, mark scientific findings well supported by evidence, distinguish accurate legal testimony from misrepresentation, and emphasize honesty and sincerity in personal life. Truth is typically regarded as a positive value, either because of its beneficial consequences or as an intrinsic good pursued for its own sake.

The word truth comes from the Old English trēowth, meaning 'fidelity'. It entered Modern English via the Middle English term trewthe.

== Basic concepts ==
=== Truthbearers ===
Philosophers discuss whether beliefs (top left), propositions (top right), or sentences (bottom) are the primary truthbearers.

Truth is commonly treated as a feature of truthbearers—entities that can be true or false. Philosophers discuss which entities serve as truthbearers, including sentences, propositions, and beliefs. Sentences are concrete linguistic entities composed of strings of words, like "It's raining in Nairobi". Their public nature and clear structure can aid philosophical analysis of truth-related phenomena. However, it is not always possible to establish a straightforward relation between a sentence and its truth value, since its meaning can be context-dependent and may also be influenced by ambiguous terms. As a result, a sentence may be true under one interpretation and false under another. Another difficulty is that sentences belong to specific languages, with the danger of limiting philosophical analysis to language-specific features rather than articulating universal principles. (Note: There are several versions of the view that sentences are truthbearers. Some theorists focus on general sentence types, while others prefer individual sentence tokens, which are particular instances occurring in specific contexts. A common restriction limits the discussion to statements or declarative sentences, excluding sentences that do not have truth values, such as questions and commands.)

Propositions are typically understood as abstract entities that serve as the meanings of declarative sentences, mitigating the difficulties of context dependence, ambiguity, and language specificity. However, their abstract nature can make philosophical discussions less tangible, and there is disagreement about the existence of abstract objects. Beliefs and related mental states are concrete psychological entities, taking the form of subjective attitudes about what is the case. They establish a direct link between truth and cognition but are difficult to study because of their private nature.

Monism about truth is the view that there is only a single kind of truthbearer, while pluralism accepts different kinds. Some identify one kind as primary and explain the truth values of secondary truthbearers in terms of it. For example, one proposal reduces the truth of beliefs to sentences since sentences can be used to express beliefs.

=== Truthmakers and truth conditions ===
Various theories rely on the concept of truthmakers as the counterpart of truthbearers. A truthmaker is a real entity whose existence makes a truthbearer true, establishing a link between language or thought and the world. For example, an orange carrot could act as a truthmaker for the sentence "the carrot is orange". Truthmakers are often treated as sufficient conditions: the existence of a truthmaker is enough for the sentence to be true, independently of other factors. Philosophers discuss which entities function as truthmakers, with candidates including facts or states of affairs, tropes, and particular objects.

Truthmakers are closely related to truth conditions, which are ways or circumstances under which a statement is true. Truth conditions specify how the world must be for a statement to be true. For instance, one truth condition of the sentence "it is raining" is that raindrops are falling. Truth conditions are often treated as necessary conditions: if a truth condition does not obtain, then the sentence cannot be true, independently of other factors. (Note: Truth-conditional semantics define sentence meaning through truth conditions: to understand a sentence is to grasp the circumstances in which it is true, with truth conditions as the necessary and sufficient conditions of its truth.) A key motivation for truthmakers and truth conditions is the idea that truth depends on reality: truth is not a free-floating convention but is anchored in how things are.

=== Others ===
Truthfulness is a virtue (Note: In a slightly different sense, truthful is also used as a synonym of true or accurate.) associated with honesty and consistency among one's words, beliefs, and behavior. It is closely related to speaking the truth but differs in some key aspects. For example, if a person sincerely states a belief, they may be truthful even if the belief is false. Conversely, someone may state a truth with the intent to deceive, or a liar may accidentally tell a truth. In both cases, truth alone is insufficient for truthfulness. Truthfulness contrasts with deception and dishonesty. Lying occurs when a speaker intentionally says something they believe to be false. Bullshitting is a related phenomenon in which a speaker is indifferent to truth or falsehood, for instance, because they only care about persuading or manipulating their audience. Truthiness, a similar term, refers to the tendency to prioritize intuition and gut feelings over evidence and rational analysis. Its meaning overlaps with the term post-truth, which denotes situations in which public opinion is shaped by appeal to emotions rather than objective facts. Deception can also take non-verbal forms, such as edited photographs, deepfakes, and AI-generated content intended to mislead or fabricate events.

Truthlikeness or verisimilitude is a concept applied to theories or statements that are close to the truth. It is often used in the context of inquiry to indicate that a theory is not fully true but approximates this goal better than others. For example, Copernican heliocentrism is a model of the Solar System that is correct in certain aspects, like that planets orbit around the Sun, and wrong in others, like claiming that the orbits are perfect circles. As a result, it is not true in a strict sense but truthlike. Truthlikeness comes in degrees. For instance, heliocentrism is more truthlike than geocentrism, which places the Earth at the center of the universe. (Note: Truthlikeness can also be used to compare true assertions. For instance, the assertion "spiders have more than two legs" is less truthlike than the assertion "spiders have eight legs" because it is less precise.) Different philosophical approaches to truthlikeness have been proposed. Some look at logical consequences, arguing that a theory's degree of truthlikeness depends on the number of its true and false consequences. Others focus on resemblance, comparing how similar the theory's description is to the actual world. Some views or frameworks, such as fuzzy logics, hold that truth itself also comes in degrees. However, the traditional view is that truth is bivalent: an assertion is either true or false with nothing in between.

Truth is closely related to justification and evidence, but there are some key differences. A belief is justified if it meets certain epistemic norms, for example, by resting on good reasons or strong evidence. Evidence for a proposition is something that supports its truth, such as observation or reliable testimony. Justification and evidence separate warranted beliefs from superstition and lucky guesses but do not guarantee truth: even well-founded beliefs can be false in unfavorable circumstances. If a justified belief is true, it may amount to knowledge, which, unlike justification on its own, has truth as a core component. Epistemologists discuss various sources of knowledge or how people may arrive at truth, such as perception, introspection, memory, reason, and testimony. Verification and fact-checking are processes that aim to assess the truth value of a proposition. They may rely on criteria of truth, which are standards by which one can recognize that a claim is true.

== Theories ==
Theories of truth aim to identify what all truths have in common. Their goal is not to list true statements but to clarify the concept of truth, discern its essential features, and explain truth-related phenomena. There is disagreement over whether such features exist and whether a given feature is an essential component of truth or merely an external criterion for identifying it.

=== Correspondence ===
According to the correspondence theory, a statement is true if it corresponds to facts.

The correspondence theory asserts that a belief or statement is true if it corresponds to facts. This view emphasizes the relation between thought or language and reality, arguing that truth matches how things are. It is one of the oldest and most influential theories of truth.

Correspondence theorists distinguish truthbearers from the reality they represent, (Note: This separates them from identity theorists, who argue that truths are identical to facts.) but the precise relation between the two is disputed. Various suggestions have been made regarding the nature of truthbearers, like seeing them as propositions, sentences, or beliefs. The classical view analyzes their relation to reality in terms of objects and properties. It assumes that truthbearers have a subject-predicate structure, in which the subject refers to an entity and the predicate denotes a property. According to this view, a statement corresponds to reality if it refers to an entity that carries the denoted property. Fact-based theories, by contrast, hold that a statement expresses a fact, and it is true if the fact obtains. One version asserts a one-to-one correlation between truths and facts, while another understands correspondence more broadly as a structural similarity that does not require a perfect one-to-one mirroring.

Truthmaker theory is closely related to correspondence theory and is often treated as a modern version of it. Truthmaker theory stresses that truth depends on reality and analyzes the relation between truths and their truthmakers. Its most comprehensive form is truthmaker maximalism, which asserts that every truth has a truthmaker. Atomic truthmaker theory, by contrast, limits this view to simple statements and analyzes the truth of complex statements in terms of simpler ones.

A key motivation for the correspondence theory is its intuitive appeal and its ability to ground truth in objective reality. A central challenge is to clarify how exactly truths relate to facts. Critics hold that the correspondence theory is uninformative or circular because it fails to explain what correspondence means. They argue that it assumes an implicit understanding of the relation without offering an independent account. Another objection asserts that the correspondence theory is too narrow because it is unable to explain truth in fields like mathematics, logic, and morality, where it is more difficult to identify independent facts corresponding to statements.

=== Coherence ===
The coherence theory understands truth as logical consistency and mutual support among beliefs.

The coherence theory understands truth (Note: The coherence theory of truth is similar to the coherence theory of knowledge but not identical.) as a relation between beliefs rather than between a belief and a fact. It asserts that a belief is true if it is part of a coherent web of beliefs. Coherence theorists typically stress that beliefs do not occur in isolation but are part of a broader perspective on reality since they depend on conceptual frameworks and background assumptions not explicitly represented in the content of each belief. For example, the belief that photons lack mass rests on a network of ideas from particle physics that ground its meaning and implications. Accordingly, coherence theory is associated with a form of holism that privileges comprehensive perspectives over individual beliefs. (Note: Historically, coherentism is often linked to metaphysical idealism.)

Different suggestions for the nature of coherence have been proposed. A minimal requirement is usually that the beliefs are logically consistent: they do not contradict each other. Another often-discussed condition is that the beliefs support each other, meaning that a collection of unrelated but consistent beliefs is not sufficient for coherence. In the strongest form, coherentism requires that all beliefs cohere. Less demanding versions assert that only the majority of beliefs need to cohere or that coherence is required within specific domains, such as scientific or moral beliefs, but not across domains.

One criticism acknowledges that coherence is relevant for testing or verifying what is true but contends that coherence theory confuses criteria of verification with truth itself. Another objection argues that there can be competing coherent sets of beliefs where one set contradicts the other, meaning that coherence alone cannot determine which set is correct. For example, a fictional story does not become true just because it is coherent.

=== Pragmatic ===
The pragmatic or pragmatist theory is a family of views that understand truth in terms of practical consequences and epistemic practices. They characterize truth by the role it plays in human affairs, seeing it as embedded in communal practices, epistemic commitments, or norms of discourse. One version asserts that a belief is true if it is practically useful because holding it and acting in accordance with it have beneficial consequences. This view argues that truth is what works, emphasizing real-life outcomes over speculative abstractions. Pragmatists discuss whether this outlook should focus on individual beliefs or comprehensive belief systems assessed over long periods.

A central difficulty for utility-based theories is that practical consequences and usefulness depend on situations and desires. This can lead to subjectivism or relativism since what is useful in one case may not be in another. Another challenge is that although practical consequences often align with truth, this is not always the case: a false belief may have good consequences in certain situations.

A different version of pragmatism defines truth from the perspective of scientific research. It holds that truth is the ideal limit of inquiry or what researchers would believe after unlimited investigation. Other pragmatist approaches define truth as beliefs that have withstood thorough examination or as statements that fulfill discourse norms and can be asserted with warrant.

=== Semantic ===
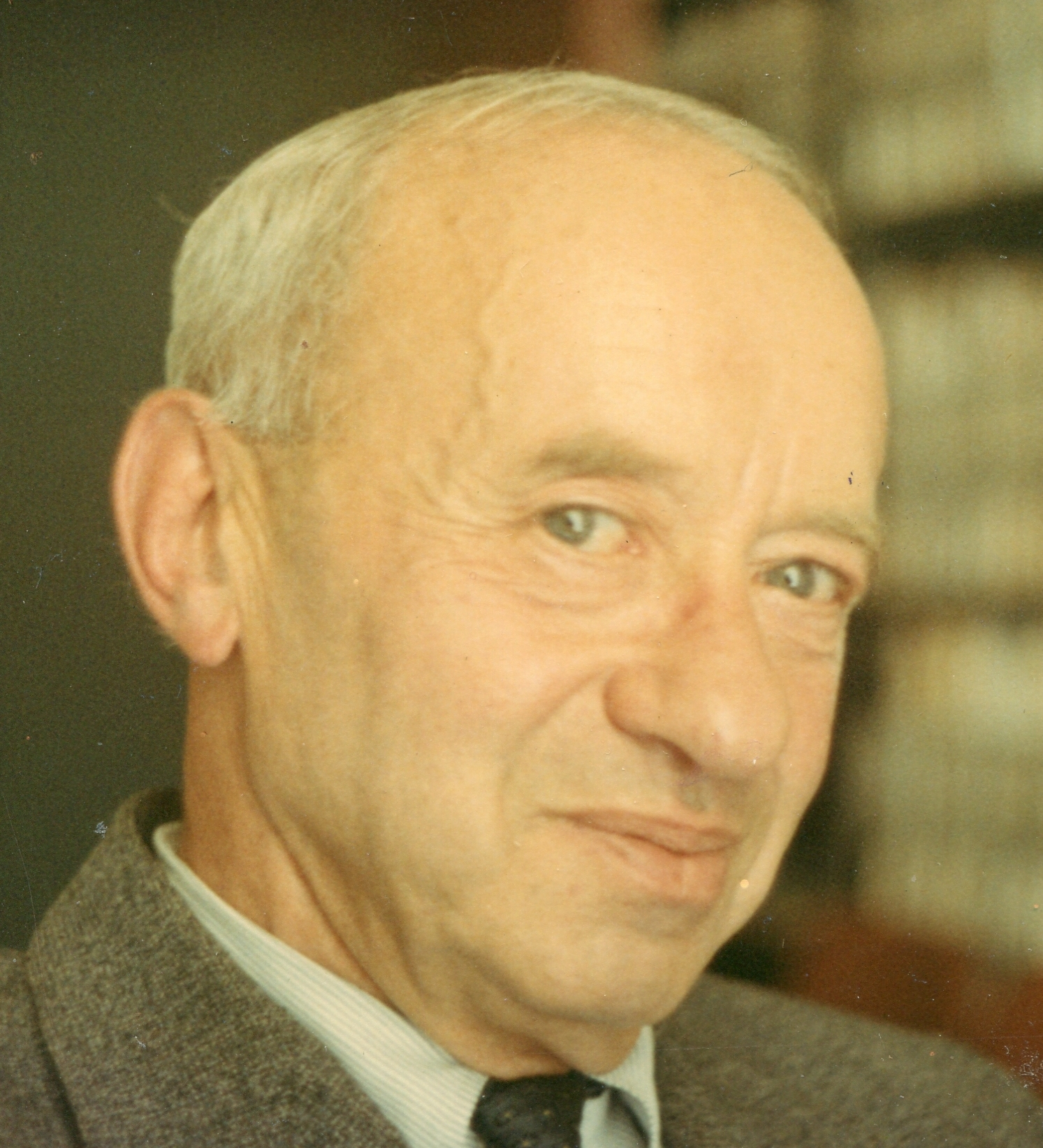
Alfred Tarski formulated the semantic theory of truth.

The semantic theory characterizes truth in terms of truth conditions. It distinguishes between an object language, which contains true sentences that are being analyzed, and a meta-language, which is employed to describe their truth conditions using so-called T-sentences. T-sentences have the form: '"$S$" is true in $L$ if and only if $p$' where $L$ is the object language, $S$ is a sentence of the object language, and $p$ is a sentence of the meta-language describing truth conditions. For example, '"La nieve es blanca" is true in Spanish if and only if snow is white' is a T-sentence with Spanish as the object language and English as the meta-language. The semantic theory was originally formulated in the 1930s by Alfred Tarski, who limited it to the analysis of formal languages. Subsequent philosophers, such as Donald Davidson, have also applied it to natural languages. The semantic theory is often combined with the idea that truth conditions can be analyzed by studying the components of sentences, such as names and predicates, which are then interpreted to refer to certain entities or situations described in the truth conditions.

A key motivation for the semantic theory is its ability to characterize truth in a precise manner without introducing metaphysical assumptions concerning the existence and nature of facts, correspondence, or coherence. By talking about truth in the object language through a metalanguage, it also avoids paradoxes that arise if a language contains its own truth-predicate, such as the liar paradox. However, it is controversial to what extent the semantic theory offers substantial insights into the nature of truth rather than only providing a formal device for analyzing truth.

=== Deflationary ===
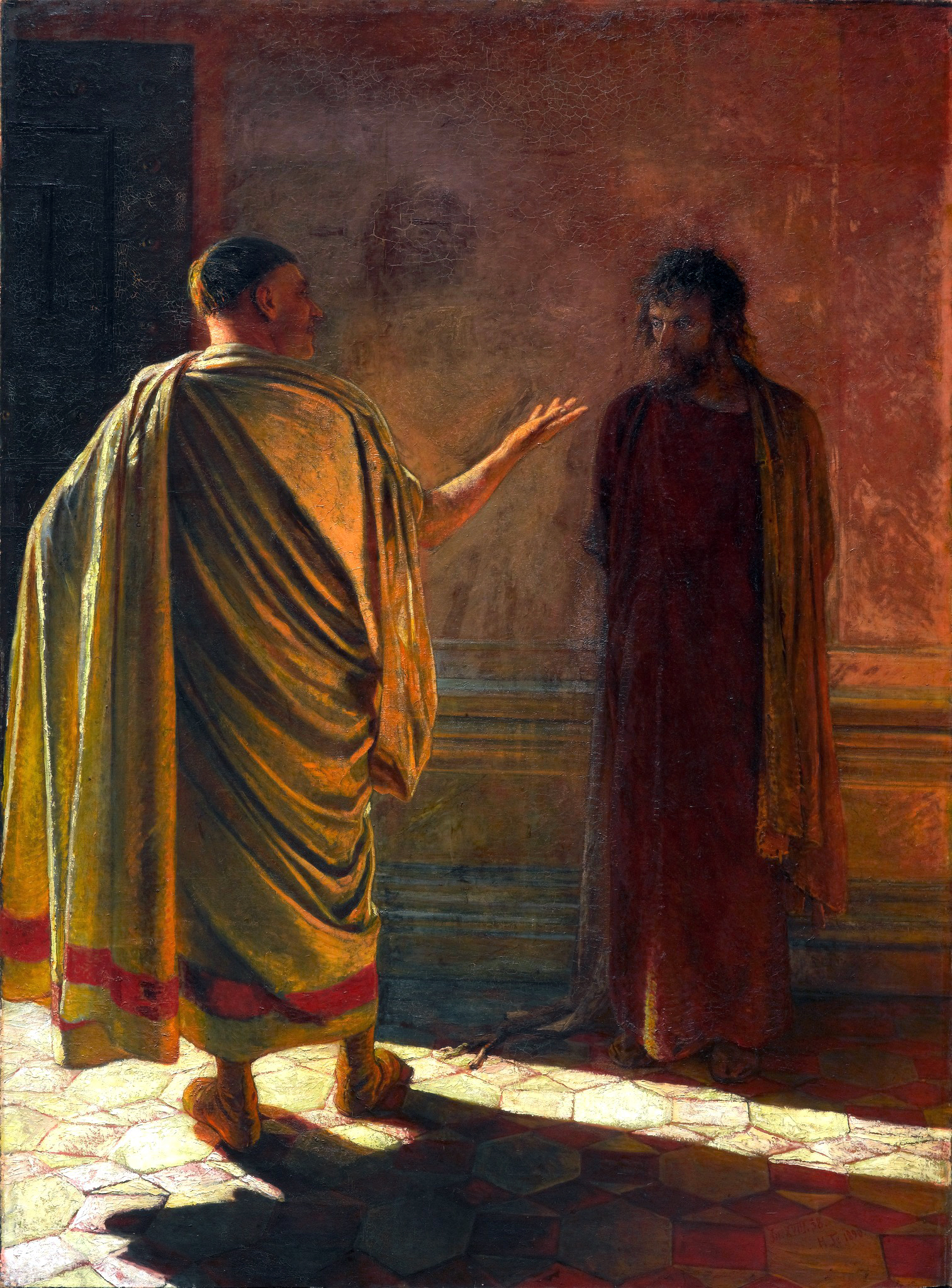
An early skepticism about the nature of truth is expressed in Pontius Pilate's rhetorical question to Jesus, asking "What is truth?"

Deflationary theories argue that truth has no significant or interesting intrinsic nature. They hold that attempts by substantive or robust theories, such as correspondence theory and coherence theory, misconstrue truth by assuming a deep metaphysical structure, engaging in pseudoproblems where trivial answers would suffice. Deflationists typically analyze how truth-related expressions are used in language, holding that understanding their linguistic roles exhausts the concept of truth.

Different deflationary theories propose distinct accounts of the linguistic function of truth-related terms, (Note: One categorization groups deflationary theories into moderate deflationism, which accepts the idea that truth is a predicate in a logical sense, and radical deflationism, which rejects this view.) including the redundancy theory, disquotationalism, the performative theory, prosententialism, and minimalism. The redundancy theory asserts that the predicate "is true" is superfluous and does not contribute to a sentence's meaning. According to this view, the sentences 'Snow is white.' and '"Snow is white" is true.' have the same meaning. Disquotationalism holds that the predicate "is true" acts as a linguistic device to remove quotation marks and make generalizations. The performative theory treats truth as a performative expression that speakers can use to endorse statements, like when saying "That's true". Prosententialism treats truth not as a regular predicate but as an operator. This operator can be applied to expressions that refer to other statements, as in "What Smith said is true". Minimalism understands truth as a logical property whose role is expressed in T-sentences.

Various criticisms of deflationism target specific versions of it, such as criticisms of the redundancy theory or minimalism. However, there are also broader objections that seek to undermine deflationism in general. One argument holds that deflationism fails to explain key aspects of truth, like that truth serves as the aim of beliefs or that theoretical truth can lead to practical success.

=== Other theories ===
Pluralists hold that there is no unified concept of truth that covers all cases. Instead, they argue that truth is a heterogeneous notion and that different theories apply to different domains. For example, a pluralist may accept the correspondence theory for empirical truths but adopt the coherence theory for mathematical truths.

Absolutism asserts that truth is the same for everyone, meaning that what is true does not depend on individual standpoints, opinions, or contexts. It contrasts with relativism, which maintains that the same statement can be true in one perspective or context and false in another. Local relativism limits this dependency to particular domains, such as moral truth. Global relativism, by contrast, extends this view to all truths. Critics argue that global relativism is a self-defeating theory that undermines its own authority: applied to itself, it holds that it is only true in some perspectives that all truths are relative. Nihilism or skepticism about truth (Note: This view differs from skepticism about knowledge, an often-discussed view in epistemology that asks whether knowledge is possible.) presents a more radical view that rejects the existence of truth.

One common categorization divides theories of truth into realism and anti-realism. Realists see truth as an objective feature that is determined by what the world is like and exists independently of thoughts and descriptions. Anti-realists argue that truth depends in part or entirely on the epistemic situation or how beliefs relate to justification, verification, inquiry, or one another. Realism is typically associated with absolutism, while anti-realism is more closely linked to relativism.

Verificationism argues that a statement is true if it is verifiable. It maintains that the procedures for confirming or disconfirming claims are not external tests of truth but constitutive norms. Verificationists typically assert that there are different verification procedures for different claims, for example, that scientific claims about empirical phenomena require observation and experimentation, whereas mathematical claims are established through deductive proof. What is verifiable or falsifiable depends on the situation and the abilities of investigators, meaning that verificationist truth is not purely objective. Additionally, some statements may be neither verifiable nor falsifiable, raising the question of whether verificationism requires a third truth value or truth-value gaps. Verificationism is sometimes grouped with coherentism as an epistemic theory. Epistemic theories define truth in terms of epistemic concepts, including coherence, verifiability, justification, and rationality.

The liar paradox involves a proposition with an inconsistent truth assignment: if the proposition is true, it follows that it is false, and if it is false, it follows that it is true.

The identity theory holds that something is true if it is identical to reality. This view rejects the distinction between truthbearers and truthmakers, arguing that truths are facts rather than representations. Primitivist theories treat truth as a basic concept that cannot be defined or analyzed in terms of more fundamental notions. Axiomatic theories sometimes adopt a primitivist outlook: they are deductive theories that suggest a small number of fundamental principles to describe how truth behaves without understanding those principles as a definition of truth. According to the consensus theory, proposed by Jürgen Habermas, truth is what people would agree upon under ideal circumstances. The term folk theory of truth refers to widely held beliefs of ordinary people about truth, like the idea that a proposition is true if its negation is false.

Theories of truth are challenged by various paradoxes in which basic intuitions or principles yield contradictory conclusions. The liar paradox involves a statement with an inconsistent truth assignment, such as the claims "I am lying" or "This statement is false": if the statement is true, it follows that it is false, and if it is false, it follows that it is true. Other paradoxes include the Curry's paradox, the Russell-Myhill paradox, and Grelling's paradox. Some paradoxes arise if a language contains its own truth predicate. (Note: A truth predicate is a linguistic device that ascribes truth to a sentence, like the expression "... is true".) Tarski sought to avoid this problem by analyzing formal languages that do not have truth predicates. Saul Kripke proposed a different approach that limits how truth predicates can be used within a language without excluding them.

== Types ==
Mathematical truths, like the Pythagorean theorem, are traditionally categorized as a priori truths.

Various types of truth are distinguished in academic discourse by domain, content, and epistemic access. For some types, it is controversial whether they exist in a strict sense. The difference between a posteriori and a priori truths rests on the source of knowledge. A posteriori truths require sensory experience, such as observing that water boils at 100°C at standard atmospheric pressure. A priori truths can be known through pure reasoning, such as a proof of a mathematical theorem. A related distinction is between synthetic and analytic truths, based on the source of the truth. A sentence is synthetic if its truth depends on what the world is like, such as "Mount Everest is the highest mountain on Earth". A sentence is analytic if its truth depends only on the meanings of its terms, as in "all bachelors are unmarried". (Note: A priori truths are typically associated with analytic truths and a posteriori truths are typically associated with synthetic truths, but the precise characterization of their relation is disputed.)

Logical truths are a special class of analytic truths. Their truth is determined by the logical form of statements, regardless of concrete contents, as in statements of the form "if $P$, then $P$". The negation of a logical truth is a logical falsity or contradiction. Contradictions can take the form of affirming and denying the same idea within a single statement, as in "the light is on and the light is not on". Most logicians consider all contradictions to be false to avoid absurdity. One exception is the school of dialetheism, which holds that some contradictions are true, arguing that reality itself can be contradictory.

Philosophers distinguish between necessary, actual, and possible truths based on the circumstances or conditions relative to which a statement is evaluated. A truth is necessary if it could not have been otherwise, meaning that it is true under all conceivable circumstances. A sentence is actually true if it correctly describes the actual world. A sentence is possibly true if there are conceivable circumstances where it is true, regardless of whether these circumstances obtain in the actual world.

Evaluative truths are about what is good or bad in some sense. They include ethical truths, which assess the moral status of principles, actions, and persons, such as the claim "murder is wrong". Aesthetic truths are about the appeal of entities, including judgments about what is beautiful and about the meanings of artworks. Axiological nihilists and error theorists challenge the existence of evaluative truths, arguing that no values exist or that all value statements are false. Subjectivism, another view, holds that they are subjective truths. A subjective truth depends on individual attitudes or personal preferences, meaning that a statement may be true from one person's perspective and false from another's. They contrast with objective truths, which hold regardless of individual attitudes or perspectives.

The concept of religious truth encompasses core teachings and doctrines within religious traditions, addressing not only how things are but also how people relate to the world. They typically concern the meaning of life, the nature of ultimate reality and the divine, and the values and practices that should guide human conduct. Some traditions distinguish between absolute and relative truth, with absolute truth pointing to a transcendent, divine reality, while relative truth refers to conventional or context-dependent teachings for everyday life. Religious truths are often grounded in faith, personal internal insight, or extraordinary spiritual experiences, drawing rationalist and scientific criticisms for relying on controversial sources of authority while lacking substantial empirical evidence that is objectively accessible.

Various forms of truth are distinguished by the field of inquiry to which they belong. Scientific truths are well-established theories in the scientific community, validated through rigorous application of the scientific method. In studying the empirical world, scientists often employ mathematical truths, which are abstract theorems or principles demonstrated through deductive reasoning from basic principles. Philosophers of mathematics discuss whether mathematical truths should be interpreted as insights into mind-independent abstract objects or as human constructions arising from formal frameworks and symbolic manipulation. In the field of history, historical truth refers to the accurate presentation of past events, but it is controversial to what extent historians can achieve this ideal. Difficulties arise from the subjective nature of interpretation and the influence of personal values and biases when integrating evidence from diverse sources to arrive at a coherent narrative. Personal historical truth plays a role in psychoanalysis as a factor shaping an individual's identity, such as the lasting effects of traumatic childhood experiences. The remembered events may diverge from objective reality due to distortions introduced by repression and confabulation.

In logic and semantics, truth simpliciter is sometimes distinguished from truth relative to a certain context, such as truth in a possible world or in a model. A possible world is a way things could have been. For example, the tyrannosaurs went extinct in the actual world, but there are possible worlds where they survived. Accordingly, the sentence "the tyrannosaurs were wiped out" is true in the actual world but false in some possible worlds. Similarly, model theory uses models—abstract mathematical structures—to interpret logical terms and expressions. In this context, the truth value of a formula can depend on the model: it may be true in one model and false in another. A related problem in the philosophy of literature concerns truth in fiction, referring to statements that accurately describe events or characters in the imagined universe of a work of fiction, such as the claim that Harry Potter wears glasses.

== In various fields ==
=== Science and philosophy ===
Truth is central to many disciplines. It is often considered a goal of inquiry that guides scientific research and intellectual life. Empirical scientists formulate testable hypotheses to explain phenomena. They rely on observation and experimentation to collect objective data, comparing results with initial hypotheses to confirm or disconfirm theories. The natural sciences engage in quantitative research, employing precise numerical measurements, often to arrive at exact general laws that can predict future outcomes. Qualitative research is more common in the social sciences, where researchers examine cultural phenomena, social processes, and subjective experiences that may resist purely numerical interpretation.

The formal sciences demonstrate the truth of theories through more abstract methods, usually based on deductive reasoning. For example, mathematicians employ several proof methods to establish theorems, such as direct proof, proof by contradiction, and mathematical induction. Formal logic studies the nature of deductive reasoning and the rules of inference it follows. A key principle in this field is that deductive inferences preserve truth: if all premises are true, then the conclusion cannot be false. Logicians develop formal systems—abstract frameworks that precisely encode forms of deductive reasoning—and examine which truths can and cannot be proven within a given formal system. (Note: Some formal systems introduce a truth predicate as a formal device to talk about the truth of sentences within the system.) Truth tables are used in logic to express how the truth values of compound propositions depend on those of their constituent propositions.

Many issues concerning the relation between truth and inquiry are addressed by epistemology, the branch of philosophy that studies the nature, origins, and limits of knowledge. This field treats truth as a central aspect of knowledge (Note: Epistemology differs in this respect from anthropology and sociology, which tend to characterize knowledge as ideas and practices that are shared and reproduced in societies, irrespective of their truth values.) and examines the ways of attaining it, including the approaches used in the empirical and formal sciences. The philosophy of language and semantics regard truth as an aspect of the meaning of sentences. They are interested in the relation between words, ideas, and the world and analyze phenomena that complicate this relation, such as ambiguity, vagueness, and context dependence. They also address the problem of truth-value gaps: the question of whether some statements are neither true nor false. (Note: Truth-value gaps are sometimes contrasted with contradictions in which a statement is both affirmed and denied, implying that it is both true and false.)

Ethics is concerned with right behavior, including truth-related behavior. For example, Immanuel Kant argued that people have a duty to tell the truth and are prohibited from lying. In metaethics, philosophers discuss whether moral statements and principles can be true, as cognitivists claim, or not, as non-cognitivists contend.

=== Religion and art ===
The Abrahamic traditions associate truth with the divine, such as the Islamic term Al-Haqq ('the Truth') as one of Allah's names.

Truth plays a central role in many religions. The Abrahamic traditions stress the importance of truthfulness and closely link truth to the divine, as reflected in the Jewish description of God as El Emet ('God of Truth'), Jesus's statement "I am the way, the truth, and the life" in Christianity, and the Islamic term Al-Haqq (lit. 'the Truth') as one of Allah's names. Philosophers in these traditions have debated the relationship between the religious truths of faith and the philosophical truths of reason. They typically argue that apparent tensions are resolvable through right interpretation. An alternative approach relies on the doctrine of double truth, according to which divergent truths can coexist in different domains.

In Hinduism, truth or satya is a key virtue to be practiced in thought, speech, and action, and is considered a source of individual and societal well-being. For example, it is one of the five moral restraints in Patanjali's Yoga. In Buddhism, the concept of truth is closely related to Buddha's teachings, such as the doctrine of the Four Noble Truths about the causes of suffering and the path to liberation. Buddhists also hold the theory of two truths, according to which conventional truth, associated with the phenomenal world and everyday experience, differs from ultimate truth, which concerns the fundamental nature of reality and is required for attaining liberation. A related contrast in Jainism distinguishes between relative truth, which is limited to a particular time, place, and perspective, and absolute truth, which transcends individual viewpoints but cannot be fully expressed in language. A form of perspectivism is also found in Taoism, which argues that knowledge is shaped by a person's interests and engagement with the world, with each perspective providing only a partial view of reality.

Truth can also be expressed through art by conveying ideas or understanding through aesthetic forms. The meanings of artworks are not always directly accessible and may require interpretation to uncover. For example, a novel exploring the feelings and choices of fictional characters may reveal deeper truths about human nature and moral dilemmas. Artworks may also evoke experiences that a person has not encountered before, showing them new perspectives or preparing them for possible future challenges. Aesthetic philosophers discuss whether or how the truths expressed in an artwork shape aesthetic experience and contribute to its overall value.

=== Other fields ===
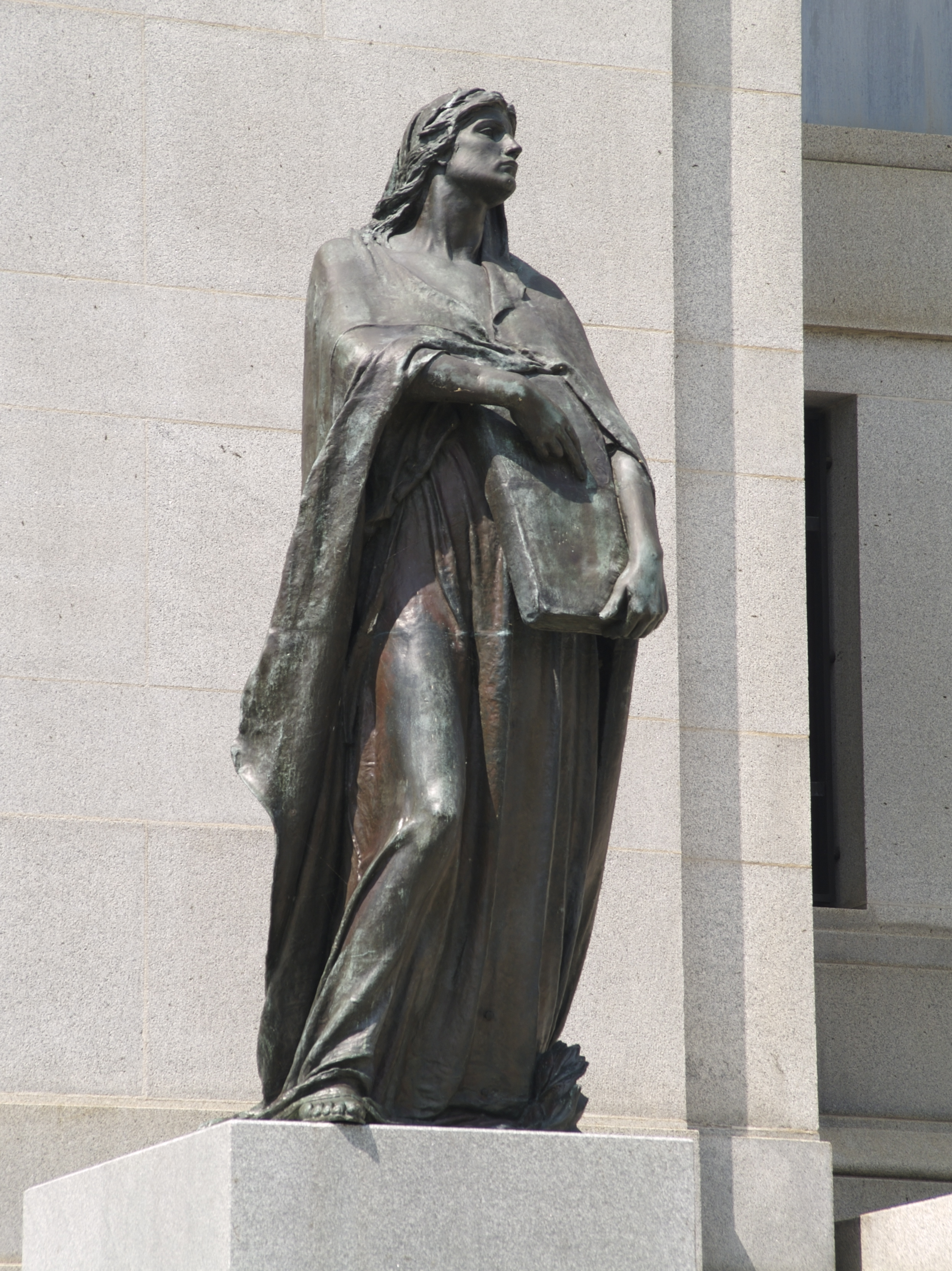
Walter Seymour Allward's Veritas ('Truth') outside the Supreme Court of Canada, emphasizing truth as a guiding norm of law

Truth plays a central role in law as a guiding norm to which legal processes and decisions should align. It is reflected in the oath to tell "the truth, the whole truth, and nothing but the truth", which is found in various legal systems. Because of difficulties in reconstructing what happened, this field relies on various standards of proof and evidentiary rules to ascertain pertinent facts. Consequently, truth by itself can be insufficient if it cannot be proven in court, contrasting factual truth, or what happened, with legal truth, or what can be established in court through admissible evidence.

Similarly, truth is a key element in journalism, where reporters seek information from reliable sources and fact-check claims to accurately inform the public. Media theorists discuss obstacles to this process, such as the spread of misinformation, misleadingly edited photographs, AI-generated images, political propaganda, and algorithmic biases on social media platforms.

Psychologists and cognitive scientists study cognitions as mental processes that acquire, transform, or use information related to truth. They examine different types of cognitive processes, like perception, memory, and thought, and investigate how biases and distortions affect these processes.

In computer science, true and false are values of constants and variables belonging to the Boolean data type. Truth values play a central role in control structures, which determine the flow of code execution, such as conditional expressions that execute a code path only if a test condition evaluates to true.

Probability theory deals with uncertain information. It uses numbers between 0 and 1 to represent the probability that a statement is true and provides rules for calculating how the probabilities of different statements influence each other.

== History ==
=== Ancient and medieval ===
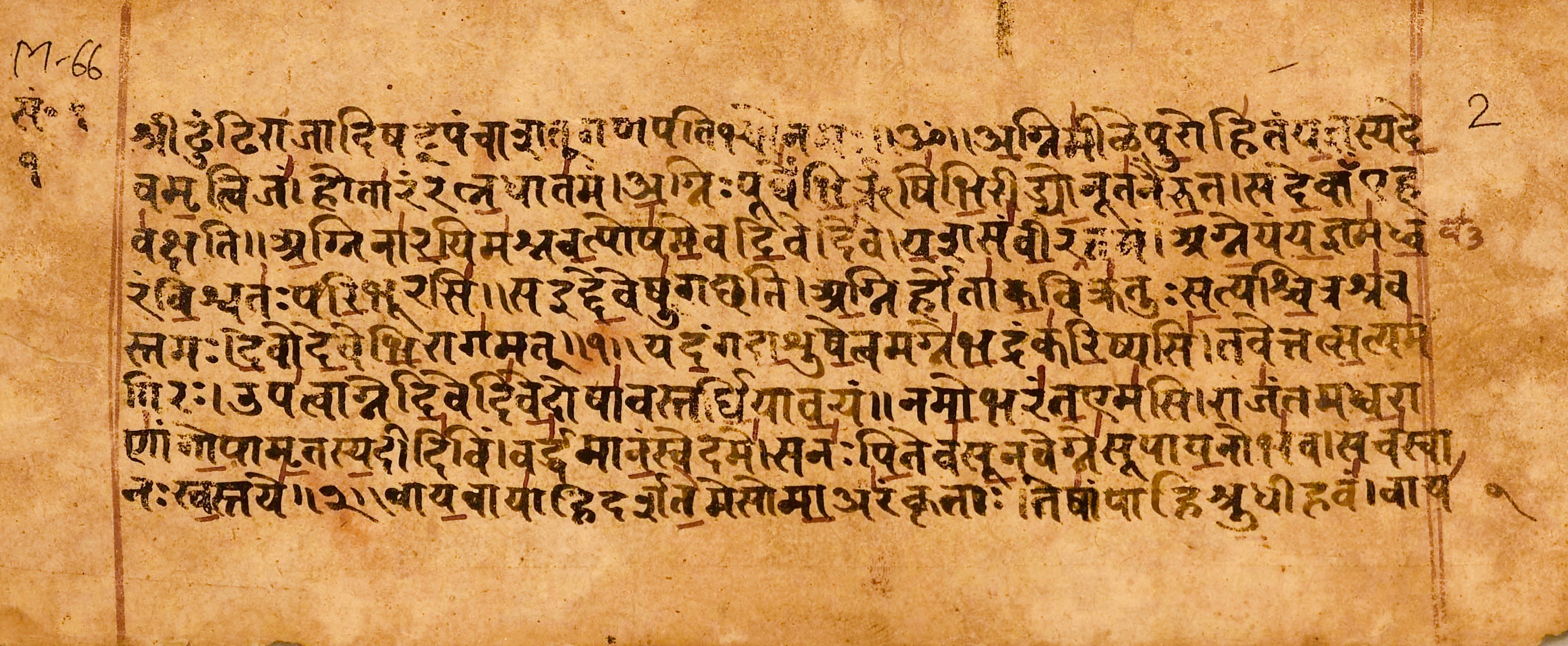
The Rigveda, an ancient Indian scripture, explored the relation between cosmic truth and individual truth.

Aristotle conceived an early form of the correspondence theory of truth.

Discussions of the role and nature of truth arose in antiquity. In ancient India, the Rigveda, composed in the 2nd millennium BCE, stressed the spiritual importance of truthfulness, exploring the relation between cosmic truth, which concerns the laws of the universe, and individual truth, which concerns each individual's duty. Jainism flourished in the 6th century BCE and distinguished relative truth, which differs according to perspective, from absolute truth, which transcends individual viewpoints. Buddhism, originating roughly in the 5th century BCE, closely associated truth with Buddha's teachings and formulated the two truths doctrine, according to which conventional truth of everyday life differs from ultimate truth about the fundamental nature of reality. The school of Nyaya, which arose around 200 CE, understood truth as a property of accurate cognitions, analyzing their internal structure in terms of objects, properties, and relations. The topic of truth received less attention in ancient Chinese thought, where the focus was more on right conduct and practical consequences than on abstract semantic properties of statements.

In ancient Greek thought, truth was understood as aletheia, or disclosure, which could refer both to reality itself and to what is revealed to the mind. Parmenides (fl. 5th century BCE) distinguished truth from opinion, associating truth with thought and being while contrasting it with non-being. Protagoras (c. 490 – c. 420 BCE) proposed a form of relativism according to which "man is the measure of all things". The skeptics questioned the human ability to acquire truth and recommended suspension of belief. Plato (c. 428 – c. 348 BCE) formulated an account of true and false statements, linking truth to reality or the way things are. His student Aristotle (384–322 BCE) conceived an early form of the correspondence theory of truth. He distinguished truthbearers in thought and speech from the things they describe, arguing that a statement is true if it aligns with how things are. Aristotle also separated truth itself from criteria of truth and held that something can be true even if no one thinks about it. Stoicism, which emerged around 300 BCE, defended the bivalence of truth, according to which every proposition is either true or false, and distinguished propositions from uttered sentences and the reality they describe.

At the transition to the medieval period, Augustine of Hippo (354–430 CE) integrated Greek philosophy with Christian doctrine. He held that truth is unchangeable, eternal, and necessary, maintaining that truth is identical to God. Building on Augustine's ideas, Anselm of Canterbury (1033–1109 CE) argued that statements are true only in a derivative sense since truth primarily resides in things that participate in God as the highest truth. Similarly, Thomas Aquinas (1225–1274 CE) conceived truth as a metaphysical property of entities. He maintained that a thing is true if it matches God's idea of it, analogous to how a designed artifact may perfectly correspond to what the artisan intended. In Islamic thought, Avicenna (c. 980–1037 CE) distinguished three senses of truth: as the reality of individual entities, as the divine reality of God as a necessary being, and as the correctness of statements.

=== Modern and contemporary ===
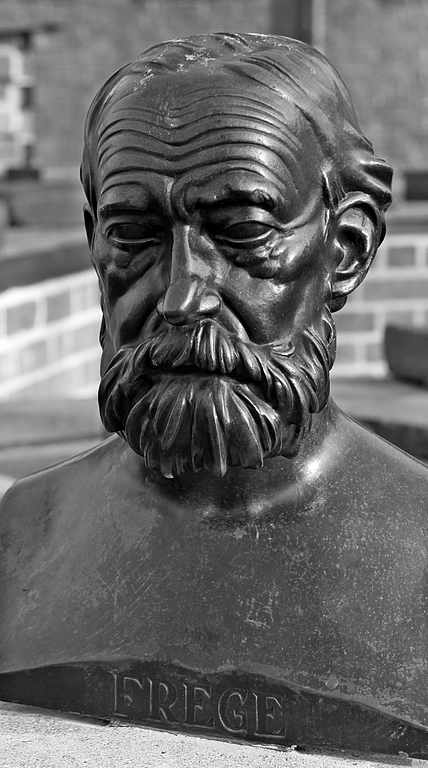
Gottlob Frege examined the role of truth in logic.

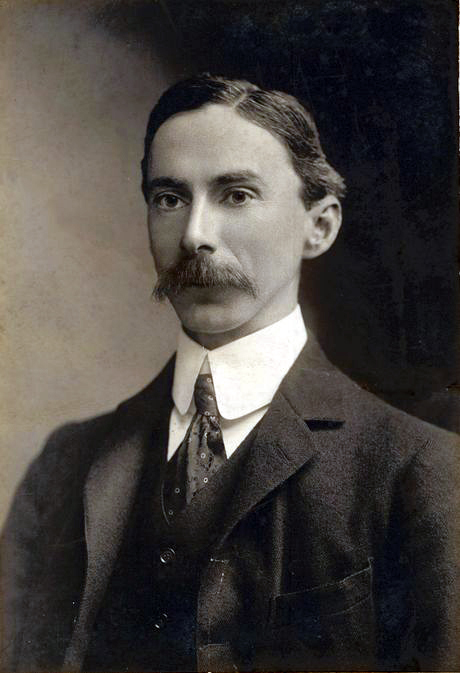
Bertrand Russell proposed an influential fact-based correspondence theory of truth.

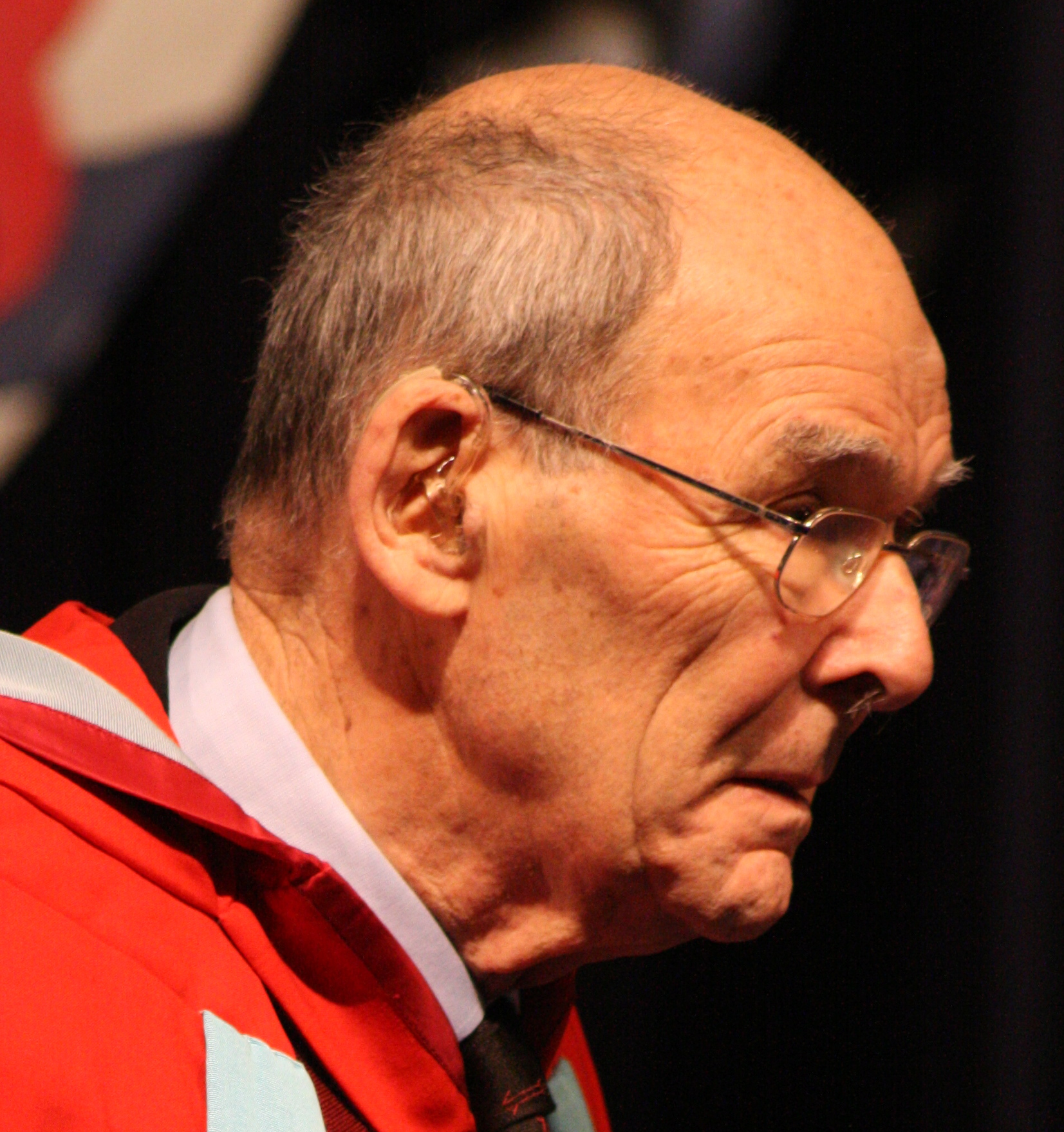
David Malet Armstrong emphasized the role of truthmakers in establishing a connection between truth and being.

In early modern philosophy, René Descartes (1596–1650) examined truth from an epistemological perspective, arguing for the existence of clear and distinct ideas that are true and cannot be doubted. Baruch Spinoza (1632–1677) asserted that human ideas are adequate or inadequate but not true in a strict sense since only ideas in God's mind are true. John Locke (1632–1704) maintained that thoughts or mental propositions are the primary truthbearers, understanding them as combinations of signs or ideas. Unlike Descartes's and Spinoza's focus on true ideas, Locke also considered true sentences or verbal propositions, holding that they are true in a derivative sense if they express true mental propositions.

Immanuel Kant understood judgments as the main truthbearers, arguing that a judgment is true if it agrees with its object. In his transcendental idealism, objects are not entirely independent of observers, since the mind actively structures experience following inbuilt forms and categories. This raises the question of the extent to which truth is objective or subjective. Bernard Bolzano (1781–1848) criticized this aspect of Kant's philosophy and proposed a clear distinction between subjective acts of representation and the objective contents of those acts, which can be true or false. Georg Wilhelm Friedrich Hegel (1770–1831) regarded truth as an agreement of a thing with its concept rather than a property of statements. According to his holistic vision, all finite things are strictly speaking false, and only the whole is true. Inspired by Hegel, F. H. Bradley (1846–1924) agreed that truth ultimately resides in the whole or the absolute. He held that truth comes in degrees based on the extent to which an entity aligns with the whole. His views are often interpreted as a form of coherence theory or identity theory.

Søren Kierkegaard (1813–1855) emphasized subjective truth or how a person's inward commitments shape their existence, expressed in the slogan "truth is subjectivity". Friedrich Nietzsche (1844–1900) understood truth as a moral phenomenon that serves the preservation and enhancement of life. He saw it as an expression of the will to power, rejecting correspondence theory in favor of a perspectivism that acknowledges multiple viewpoints without an overarching objective truth. In the pragmatist tradition, William James (1842–1910) characterized truth in terms of practical consequences and utility, while C. S. Peirce (1839–1914) argued that truth is what would result after endless scientific inquiry.

Gottlob Frege (1848–1925) examined the role of truth in logic, such as his ideas that sentences refer to truth values and that logical operators and predicates are functions that yield truth values. His outlook inspired deflationism, but not all of his views are compatible with this theory. In their early philosophies, G. E. Moore (1873–1958) and Bertrand Russell (1872–1970) defended a kind of primitivism according to which truth is an indefinable property. They later proposed a fact-based correspondence theory, often treated as the classical formulation of this view, stating that a belief is true if it corresponds to a fact. Responding to Russell, Ludwig Wittgenstein (1889–1951) defined truth as a form of correspondence in which a proposition pictures a fact.

Alfred Tarski (1901–1983) developed the semantic theory of truth, which uses a meta-language to analyze the truth conditions of sentences in an object language. He limited this view to truth in formal languages. Donald Davidson (1917–2003) extended Tarski's approach to the study of truth in natural languages. David Malet Armstrong (1926–2014) developed truthmaker theory as a modern version of correspondence theory. He stressed the dependence of truth on being and explored truthmaker theory as an approach to metaphysical inquiry.

Various deflationary theories, proposed by philosophers such as P. F. Strawson (1919–2006), Willard Van Orman Quine (1908–2000), and Paul Horwich (born 1947), aimed to show that truth is a trivial linguistic device without deeper metaphysical significance. Michael Dummett (1925–2011) criticized deflationism and developed a form of verificationism according to which a statement is true if it is verifiable. (Note: The idea of verificationism was already discussed earlier by the logical positivists. However, it is controversial whether they understood it only as a theory of meaning or also as a theory of truth.) Responding to the difficulties of providing a unified concept of truth, Hilary Putnam (1926–2016) and Richard Rorty (1931–2007) formulated pluralist theories of truth, according to which the nature of truth is not uniform but depends on the analyzed domain.

Edmund Husserl (1859–1938) analyzed truth from a phenomenological perspective as an ideal correlate of intentional acts, emphasizing the role of evident experience. His student Martin Heidegger (1889–1976) understood truth as unconcealment in his attempt to recover the ancient Greek concept of aletheia, which he regarded as more fundamental than the modern concept of correspondence. Inspired by Kant's idealism, Jean-Paul Sartre (1905–1980) characterized truth as "subjectivity externalized", understanding it as the way the mind-independent world is illuminated and becomes meaningful to human consciousness. Postmodern philosophers challenged the idea that truth is objective and universal, analyzing how power relations and social contexts shape what is accepted as true. For example, Michel Foucault explored the role of truth in discursive practices and social institutions, such as the idea that institutions determine what counts as truth and use it to wield power.

== See also ==
- Asha – Central and complex Zoroastrian theological concept
- Seek truth from facts – Chinese slogan
- Slingshot argument – Argument in philosophical logic
