= Deflationary theory of truth =

Family of philosophical theories

In philosophy and logic, a deflationary theory of truth (also semantic deflationism or simply deflationism) is one of a family of theories that all have in common the claim that assertions of predicate truth of a statement do not attribute a property called "truth" to such a statement.

== Redundancy theory ==
Gottlob Frege was probably the first philosopher or logician to note that predicating truth or existence does not express anything above and beyond the statement to which it is attributed. He remarked:

It is worthy of notice that the sentence "I smell the scent of violets" has the same content as the sentence "it is true that I smell the scent of violets". So it seems, then, that nothing is added to the thought by my ascribing to it the property of truth. (Frege, G., 1918. "Thought", in his Logical Investigations, Oxford: Blackwell, 1977)

Nevertheless, the first serious attempt at the formulation of a theory of truth which attempted to systematically define the truth predicate out of existence is attributable to F. P. Ramsey. Ramsey argued, against the prevailing currents of the times, that not only was it not necessary to construct a theory of truth on the foundation of a prior theory of meaning (or mental content) but that once a theory of content had been successfully formulated, it would become obvious that there was no further need for a theory of truth, since the truth predicate would be demonstrated to be redundant. Hence, his particular version of deflationism is commonly referred to as the redundancy theory. Ramsey noted that in ordinary contexts in which we attribute truth to a proposition directly, as in "It is true that Caesar was murdered", the predicate "is true" does not seem to be doing any work. "It is true that Caesar was murdered" just means "Caesar was murdered" and "It is false that Caesar was murdered" just means that "Caesar was not murdered".

Ramsey recognized that the simple elimination of the truth-predicate from all statements in which it is used in ordinary language was not the way to go about attempting to construct a comprehensive theory of truth. For example, take the sentence Everything that John says is true. This can be easily translated into the formal sentence with variables ranging over propositions For all P, if John says P, then P is true. But attempting to directly eliminate "is true" from this sentence, on the standard first-order interpretation of quantification in terms of objects, would result in the ungrammatical formulation For all P, if John says P, then P. It is ungrammatical because P must, in that case, be replaced by the name of an object and not a proposition. Ramsey's approach was to suggest that such sentences as "He is always right" could be expressed in terms of relations: "For all a, R and b, if he asserts aRb, then aRb".

Ramsey also noticed that, although his paraphrasings and definitions could be easily rendered in logical symbolism, the more fundamental problem was that, in ordinary English, the elimination of the truth-predicate in a phrase such as Everything John says is true would result in something like "If John says something, then that". Ramsey attributed this to a defect in natural language, suggesting that such pro-sentences as "that" and "what" were being treated as if they were pronouns. This "gives rise to artificial problems as to the nature of truth, which disappear at once when they are expressed in logical symbolism..." According to Ramsey, it is only because natural languages lack, what he called, pro-sentences (expressions that stand in relation to sentences as pronouns stand to nouns) that the truth predicate cannot be defined away in all contexts.

A. J. Ayer took Ramsey's idea one step further by declaring that the redundancy of the truth predicate implies that there is no such property as truth.

There are sentences...in which the word "truth" seems to stand for something real; and this leads the speculative philosopher to enquire what this "something" is. Naturally he fails to obtain a satisfactory answer, since his question is illegitimate. For our analysis has shown that the word "truth" does not stand for anything, in the way which such a question requires.

This extreme version of deflationism has often been called the disappearance theory or the no truth theory of truth and it is easy to understand why, since Ayer seems here to be claiming both that the predicate "is true" is redundant (and therefore unnecessary) and also that there is no such property as truth to speak of.

== Performative theory ==
Peter Strawson formulated a performative theory of truth in the 1950s. Like Ramsey, Strawson believed that there was no separate problem of truth apart from determining the semantic contents (or facts of the world) which give the words and sentences of language the meanings that they have. Once the questions of meaning and reference are resolved, there is no further question of truth. Strawson's view differs from Ramsey's, however, in that Strawson maintains that there is an important role for the expression "is true": specifically, it has a performative role similar to "I promise to clean the house". In asserting that p is true, we not only assert that p but also perform the "speech act" of confirming the truth of a statement in a context. We signal our agreement or approbation of a previously uttered assertion or confirm some commonly held belief or imply that what we are asserting is likely to be accepted by others in the same context.

== Tarski and deflationary theories ==
Some years before Strawson developed his account of the sentences which include the truth-predicate as performative utterances, Alfred Tarski had developed his so-called semantic theory of truth. Tarski's basic goal was to provide a rigorously logical definition of the expression "true sentence" within a specific formal language and to clarify the fundamental conditions of material adequacy that would have to be met by any definition of the truth-predicate. If all such conditions were met, then it would be possible to avoid semantic paradoxes such as the liar paradox (i.e., "This sentence is false.") Tarski's material adequacy condition, or Convention T, is: a definition of truth for an object language implies all instances of the sentential form

(T) S is true if and only if P

where S is replaced by a name of a sentence (in the object language) and P is replaced by a translation of that sentence in the metalanguage. So, for example, "La neve è bianca is true if and only if snow is white" is a sentence which conforms to Convention T; the object language is Italian and the metalanguage is English. The predicate "true" does not appear in the object language, so no sentence of the object language can directly or indirectly assert truth or falsity of itself. Tarski thus formulated a two-tiered scheme that avoids semantic paradoxes such as Russell's paradox.

Tarski formulated his definition of truth indirectly through a recursive definition of the satisfaction of sentential functions and then by defining truth in terms of satisfaction. An example of a sentential function is "x defeated y in the 2004 US presidential elections"; this function is said to be satisfied when we replace the variables x and y with the names of objects such that they stand in the relation denoted by "defeated in the 2004 US presidential elections" (in the case just mentioned, replacing x with "George W. Bush" and y with "John Kerry" would satisfy the function, resulting in a true sentence). In general, a_{1}, ..., a_{n} satisfy an n-ary predicate φ(x_{1}. ..., x_{n}) if and only if substitution of the names "a_{1}", ..., "a_{n}" for the variables of φ in the relevant order yields "φ(a_{1}, ..., a_{n})", and φ(a_{1}, ..., a_{n}). Given a method for establishing the satisfaction (or not) of every atomic sentence of the form A(..., x_{k}, ...), the usual rules for truth-functional connectives and quantifiers yield a definition for the satisfaction condition of all sentences of the object language. For instance, for any two sentences A, B, the sentence A & B is satisfied if and only if A and B are satisfied (where '&' stands for conjunction), for any sentence A, ~A is satisfied if and only if A fails to be satisfied, and for any open sentence A where x is free in A, (x)A is satisfied if and only if for every substitution of an item of the domain for x yielding A*, A* is satisfied. Whether any complex sentence is satisfied is seen to be determined by its structure. An interpretation is an assignment of denotation to all of the non-logical terms of the object language. A sentence A is true (under an interpretation I) if and only if it is satisfied in I.

Tarski thought of his theory as a species of correspondence theory of truth, not a deflationary theory.

== Disquotationalism ==
On the basis of Tarski's semantic conception, W. V. O. Quine developed what eventually came to be called the disquotational theory of truth or disquotationalism. Quine interpreted Tarski's theory as essentially deflationary. He accepted Tarski's treatment of sentences as the only truth-bearers. Consequently, Quine suggested that the truth-predicate could only be applied to sentences within individual languages. The basic principle of disquotationalism is that an attribution of truth to a sentence undoes the effects of the quotation marks that have been used to form sentences. Instead of (T) above then, Quine's reformulation would be something like the following "Disquotation Schema":

(DS) Sentence "S" is true if and only if S.

Disquotationalists are able to explain the existence and usefulness of the truth predicate in such contexts of generalization as "John believes everything that Mary says" by asserting, with Quine, that we cannot dispense with the truth predicate in these contexts because the convenient expression of such generalization is precisely the role of the truth predicate in language. In the case of "John believes everything that Mary says", if we try to capture the content of John's beliefs, we would need to form an infinite conjunction such as the following:

If Mary says that lemons are yellow, then lemons are yellow, and if Mary says that lemons are green, then lemons are green, and...

The disquotation schema (DS), allows us to reformulate this as:

If Mary says that lemons are yellow, then the sentence "lemons are yellow" is true, and if Mary says that lemons are green, then the sentence "lemons are green" is true, and...

Since x is equivalent to "x" is true, for the disquotationalist, then the above infinite conjunctions are also equivalent. Consequently, we can form the generalization:

For all sentences "S", if Mary said S, then "S" is true.

Since we could not express this statement without a truth-predicate along the lines of those defined by deflationary theories, it is the role of the truth predicate in forming such generalizations that characterizes all that needs to be characterized about the concept of truth.

== Prosententialism ==
Grover, Camp and Belnap developed a deflationary theory of truth called prosententialism, which has since been defended by Robert Brandom.

Prosententialism asserts that there are prosentences which stand in for and derive their meanings from the sentences which they substitute. In the statement:

Bill is tired and he is hungry.

the pronoun "he" takes its reference from the noun "Bill." By analogy, in the statement:

He explained that he was in financial straits, said that this is how things were, and that therefore he needed an advance.

the clause "this is how things were" receives its reference from the previously occurring sentential clause "he was in financial straits", according to a prosententialist account.

How does this relate to truth? Prosententialists view the statements that contain "is true" as sentences which do not contain a truth-predicate but rather contain some form of prosentence; the truth-predicate itself is part of an anaphoric or prosentential construction. Prosententialists point out the many parallels which exist between pronouns and prosentences. Pronouns are often used out of "laziness", as in:

Bill is tired and he is hungry

or they can be used in quantificational contexts, such as:

Someone is in the room and he is armed with a rifle.

In a similar manner, "it is true" can be used as a prosentence of laziness, as in:

Fred believes that it is raining and it is true.

and as a quantificational prosentence, such as:

Whatever Alice believes is true.

Prosententialists therefore reject the idea that truth is a property of some sort.

== Minimalism ==
Paul Horwich's minimal theory of truth, also known as minimalism, takes the primary truth-bearing entities to be propositions, rather than sentences. According to the minimalist view then, truth is indeed a property of propositions (or sentences, as the case may be) but it is so minimal and anomalous a property that it cannot be said to provide us with any useful information about or insight into the nature of truth. It is fundamentally nothing more than a sort of metalinguistic property.

Another way of formulating the minimalist thesis is to assert that the conjunction of all of the instances of the following schema:

The proposition that P is true if and only if P.

provides an implicit definition of the property of truth. Each such instance is an axiom of the theory and there are an infinite number of such instances (one for every actual or possible proposition in the universe). Our concept of truth consists of nothing more than a disposition to assent to all of the instances of the above schema when we encounter them.

== Objections to deflationism ==
One of the main objections to deflationary theories of all flavors was formulated by Jackson, Oppy and Smith in 1994 (following Kirkham 1992). According to the objection, if deflationism is interpreted as a sentential theory (that is, one where truth is predicated of sentences on the left hand side of the biconditionals such as (T) above), then deflationism is false; on the other hand, if it is interpreted as a propositional theory, then it is trivial. Examining another simple instance of the standard equivalence schema:

Grass is green is true if and only if grass is green.

the objection is just that, if the italicized words are taken as a sentence, then it is false, because something more is required for the whole statement to be true than merely the fact that "grass is green" is true. It is also necessary that the sentence "grass is green" means that grass is green and this further linguistic fact is not dealt with in the equivalence schema.

However, if we now assume that grass is green on the left-hand side refers to a proposition, then the theory seems trivial since grass is green is defined as true if and only if grass is green. Note that the triviality involved here is not caused by the concept of truth but by that of proposition. In any case, simply accepting the triviality of the propositional version implies that, at least within the Deflationary Theory of Truth, there can be no explanation of the connection between sentences and the things that they express; i.e., propositions.

=== Normativity of assertions ===
Michael Dummett, among others, has argued that deflationism cannot account for the fact that truth should be a normative goal of assertion. The idea is that truth plays a central role in the activity of stating facts. The deflationist response is that the assertion that truth is a norm of assertion can be stated only in the form of the following infinite conjunction:

One should assert the proposition that grass is green only if grass is green and one should assert the proposition that lemons are yellow only if lemons are yellow and one should assert the proposition that a square circle is impossible only if a squared circle is impossible and...

This, in turn, can be reformulated as:

For all propositions P, speakers should assert the propositions that P only if the proposition that P is true.

It may be the case that we use the truth-predicate to express this norm, not because it has anything to do with the nature of truth in some inflationary sense, but because it is a convenient way of expressing this otherwise inexpressible generalization.

== See also ==
- Coherentism – Type of epistemology
- Confirmation holism – Idea in the philosophy of science
- Truth – Conformity to reality
- Truth theory
  - Truthmaker theory – Branch of metaphysics

=== Related topics ===
- Belief – Subjective attitude that something is true
- Epistemology – Philosophical study of knowledge
- Information – Facts provided or learned about something or someone
- Inquiry – Type of investigation
- Knowledge – Awareness of facts, or competency
- Pragmatism – Philosophical tradition
- Pragmaticism – Branch of pragmatic philosophy
- Pragmatic maxim – Maxim of logic formulated by Charles Sanders Peirce
- Reproducibility – Aspect of scientific research
- Scientific method – Interplay between observation, experiment, and theory in science
- Testability – Ability to examine a theory by experimentation
- Verificationism – Philosophical doctrine
