= Disquotational principle =

Philosophical assertion about rational thought

The disquotational principle is a philosophical principle which holds that a rational speaker will accept "p" if and only if they believe p. The quotation marks indicate that the statement p is being treated as a sentence, and not as a proposition. This principle is presupposed by claims that hold that substitution fails in certain intensional contexts.

== Overview ==
Consider the following argument:

(1) Sally accepts the assertion that "Cicero was a famous orator" while dissenting from the assertion that "Tully was a famous orator".
(2) Cicero is Tully
Therefore, (3) Sally believes that Tully was a famous orator.

To derive (3), we have to assume that when Sally accepts that "Cicero was a famous orator", she believes that Cicero was a famous orator. Then we can exchange Cicero for Tully, and derive (3). Bertrand Russell thought that this demonstrated the failure of substitutivity of identicals in intensional contexts.

In "A Puzzle about Belief," Saul Kripke argues that the application of the disquotational theorem can yield a paradox on its own, without appeal to the substitution principle, and that this may show that the problem lies with the former, and not the latter. There are various formulations of this argument.

Suppose that, Pierre, a Frenchman, comes to believe that (1) "Londres est jolie" (London is pretty), without ever having visited the city. Later in life, Pierre ends up living in London. He finds no French speakers there (he does not speak English yet), and everyone refers to the city as "London," not Londres. He finds this city decidedly unattractive, for the neighborhood he decides to live in is decidedly unattractive. Over time, he learns English, and formulates the belief that (2) "London is not pretty". Pierre never realizes that London is the English word for Londres. Now with the disquotational principle, we can deduce from (1) that Pierre believes the proposition that Londres est jolie. With a weak principle of translation (e.g., "a proposition in language A is the same as a semantically identical proposition in language B" [note that a proposition is not the same as a sentence]), we can now deduce that Pierre believes that London is pretty. But we can also deduce from (2) and the disquotational principle that Pierre believes that London is not pretty. These deductions can be made even though Pierre has made no logical blunders in forming his beliefs. Without the disquotational principle, this contradiction could not be derived, because we would not be able to assume that (1) and (2) meant anything in particular.

This paradox can also be derived without appeal to another language. Suppose that Pierre assents to the proposition "Paderewski had musical talent", perhaps having heard that this man was a famous pianist. With the disquotational principle, we can deduce that Pierre believes the proposition that Paderewski had musical talent. Now suppose that Pierre overhears a friend discussing the political exploits of a certain statesman, Paderewski, without knowing that the two Paderewskis are the same man. Pierre's background tells him that statesmen are generally not very gifted in music, and this leads him to the belief that Paderewski had no musical talent. The disquotation principle allows us to deduce that Pierre believes the proposition that Paderewski had no musical talent. Using this principle, we have now deduced that Pierre believes that Paderewski had musical talent, and does not believe that Paderewski had musical talent, even though Pierre's beliefs were formed logically.

== See also ==
- Convention T
- Disquotational theory of truth
- T-schema
- Use-mention
