= Quasi-quotation =

Linguistic device in formal languages

Quasi-quotation or Quine quotation is a linguistic device in formal languages that facilitates rigorous and terse formulation of general rules about linguistic expressions while properly observing the use–mention distinction. It was introduced by the philosopher and logician Willard Van Orman Quine in his book Mathematical Logic, originally published in 1940. In that book, they are called corners and quasi-quotation. Put simply, quasi-quotation enables one to introduce symbols that stand for a linguistic expression in a given instance and are used as that linguistic expression in a different instance. An example of a quasi-quoted expression, in one of the most popular notations for quasi-quotation, is ⌜~φ⌝.

== Basic overview ==
The basic problem is this: assume μ is a variable that represents an expression. For instance, expressions like "dogs are cool", "x+y", or anything else allowed by the language being worked in. (The author would write these expressions in quotation marks to show that they are expressions, not variables like μ.)

The author wishes to express some related expression derived from μ, like an exclamation mark followed by an open parenthesis followed by the value of μ followed by a close parenthesis.

One way to try to write this new expression would be "!(μ)". However, if the quote marks here are taken literally, this actually expresses an exclamation mark followed by an open parenthesis followed by the letter μ followed by a close parenthesis, which is not what was desired.

Another way to try to write this would be !(μ). However, now this is not written like an expression, and instead seems to express that some undefined exclamation mark operator is being applied to the variable μ. This is also not desirable.

Quine quotation solves this problem, by writing ⌜!(μ)⌝, with the explicit convention that this means the variables in the Quine-quoted expression should be taken as their value, and everything else should be taken as normal, literal, quoted symbols. Thus, ⌜!(μ)⌝ expresses an exclamation mark followed by an open parenthesis followed by the value of μ followed by a close parenthesis.

Those previous two ways of writing the new derived expression could also be made valid by the convention of the author. For example, the author could state that normal quotation marks all work like Quine quotation in his text, or that when an unknown symbol is encountered outside of a quotation it should always be treated as a literal instance of that symbol, as though it were quoted. (The convention may even be left unstated, and rely on the reader to navigate any possible ambiguity!) However, the Quine quotation convention may be clearer, by being less visually ambiguous.

== Further usage information ==
For example, one can use quasi-quotation to illustrate an instance of substitutional quantification, like the following:

"Snow is white" is true if and only if snow is white.
Therefore, there is some sequence of symbols that makes the following sentence true when every instance of φ is replaced by that sequence of symbols: "φ" is true if and only if φ.

Quasi-quotation is used to indicate (usually in more complex formulas) that the φ and "φ" in this sentence are related things, that one is the iteration of the other in a metalanguage. Quine introduced quasiquotes because he wished to avoid the use of variables, and work only with closed sentences (expressions not containing any free variables). However, he still needed to be able to talk about sentences with arbitrary predicates in them, and thus, the quasiquotes provided the mechanism to make such statements. Quine had hoped that, by avoiding variables and schemata, he would minimize confusion for the readers, as well as staying closer to the language that mathematicians actually use.

Quasi-quotation is sometimes denoted using the symbols ⌜ and ⌝ (called "Quine quotes" or "Quine corners", Unicode U+231C, U+231D), or double square brackets, ⟦ ⟧ ("Oxford brackets", Unicode U+27E6, U+27E7), instead of ordinary quotation marks.

== How it works ==
Quasi-quotation is particularly useful for stating formation rules for formal languages. Suppose, for example, that one wants to define the well-formed formulas (wffs) of a new formal language, L, with only a single logical operation, negation, via the following recursive definition:

1. Any lowercase Roman letter (with or without subscripts) is a well-formed formula (wff) of L.
2. If φ is a well-formed formula (wff) of L, then '~φ' is a well-formed formula (wff) of L.
3. Nothing else is a well-formed formula (wff) of L.

Interpreted literally, rule 2 does not express what is apparently intended. For '~φ' (that is, the result of concatenating '~' and 'φ', in that order, from left to right) is not a well-formed formula (wff) of L, because no Greek letter can occur in well-formed formulas (wffs), according to the apparently intended meaning of the rules. In other words, our second rule says "If some sequence of symbols φ (for example, the sequence of 3 symbols φ = '~~p') is a well-formed formula (wff) of L, then the sequence of 2 symbols '~φ' is a well-formed formula (wff) of L". Rule 2 needs to be changed so that the second occurrence of 'φ' (in quotes) be not taken literally.

Quasi-quotation is introduced as shorthand to capture the fact that what the formula expresses isn't precisely quotation, but instead something about the concatenation of symbols. Our replacement for rule 2 using quasi-quotation looks like this:

2'. If φ is a well-formed formula (wff) of L, then ⌜~φ⌝ is a well-formed formula (wff) of L.

The quasi-quotation marks '⌜' and '⌝' are interpreted as follows. Where 'φ' denotes a well-formed formula (wff) of L, '⌜~φ⌝' denotes the result of concatenating '~' and the well-formed formula (wff) denoted by 'φ' (in that order, from left to right). Thus rule 2' (unlike rule 2) entails, e.g., that if 'p' is a well-formed formula (wff) of L, then '~p' is a well-formed formula (wff) of L.

Similarly, we could not define a language with disjunction by adding this rule:

2.5. If φ and ψ are well-formed formulas (wffs) of L, then '(φ v ψ)' is a well-formed formula (wff) of L.

But instead:

2.5'. If φ and ψ are well-formed formulas (wffs) of L, then ⌜(φ v ψ)⌝ is a well-formed formula (wff) of L.

The quasi-quotation marks here are interpreted just the same. Where 'φ' and 'ψ' denote well-formed formulas (wffs) of L, '⌜(φ v ψ)⌝' denotes the result of concatenating left parenthesis, the well-formed formula (wff) denoted by 'φ', space, 'v', space, the well-formed formula (wff) denoted by 'ψ', and right parenthesis (in that order, from left to right). Just as before, rule 2.5' (unlike rule 2.5) entails, e.g., that if 'p' and 'q' are well-formed formulas (wffs) of L, then '(p v q)' is a well-formed formula (wff) of L.

== Scope issues ==
It does not make sense to quantify into quasi-quoted contexts using variables that range over things other than character strings (e.g. numbers, people, electrons). Suppose, for example, that one wants to express the idea that 's(0)' denotes the successor of 0, 's(1)' denotes the successor of 1, etc. One might be tempted to say:

- If φ is a natural number, then ⌜s(φ)⌝ denotes the successor of φ.

Suppose, for example, φ = 7. What is ⌜s(φ)⌝ in this case? The following tentative interpretations would all be equally absurd:

1. ⌜s(φ)⌝ = 's(7)',
2. ⌜s(φ)⌝ = 's(111)' (in the binary system, '111' denotes the integer 7),
3. ⌜s(φ)⌝ = 's(VII)',
4. ⌜s(φ)⌝ = 's(seven)',
5. ⌜s(φ)⌝ = 's(семь)' ('семь' means 'seven' in Russian),
6. ⌜s(φ)⌝ = 's(the number of days in one week)'.

On the other hand, if φ = '7', then ⌜s(φ)⌝ = 's(7)', and if φ = 'seven', then ⌜s(φ)⌝ = 's(seven)'.

The expanded version of this statement reads as follows:

- If φ is a natural number, then the result of concatenating 's', left parenthesis, φ, and right parenthesis (in that order, from left to right) denotes the successor of φ.

This is a category mistake, because a number is not the sort of thing that can be concatenated (though a numeral is).

The proper way to state the principle is:

- If φ is an Arabic numeral that denotes a natural number, then ⌜s(φ)⌝ denotes the successor of the number denoted by φ.

It is tempting to characterize quasi-quotation as a device that allows quantification into quoted contexts, but this is incorrect: quantifying into quoted contexts is always illegitimate. Rather, quasi-quotation is just a convenient shortcut for formulating ordinary quantified expressions—the kind that can be expressed in first-order logic.

As long as these considerations are taken into account, it is perfectly harmless to "abuse" the corner quote notation and simply use it whenever something like quotation is necessary but ordinary quotation is clearly not appropriate.

== See also ==
- Self-evaluating forms and quoting in Lisp, where "quasi-quotation" has been adopted for metaprogramming
- String interpolation
- Truth-value semantics (substitution interpretation)
- Template processor
