= Theories of truth =

Theories of truth aim to identify what all truths have in common. They seek to clarify the role and concept of truth and discern its essential features. Different theories disagree about what those features are, whether they depend on the domain of analysis, and whether truth has a substantive definition.

== Substantive ==
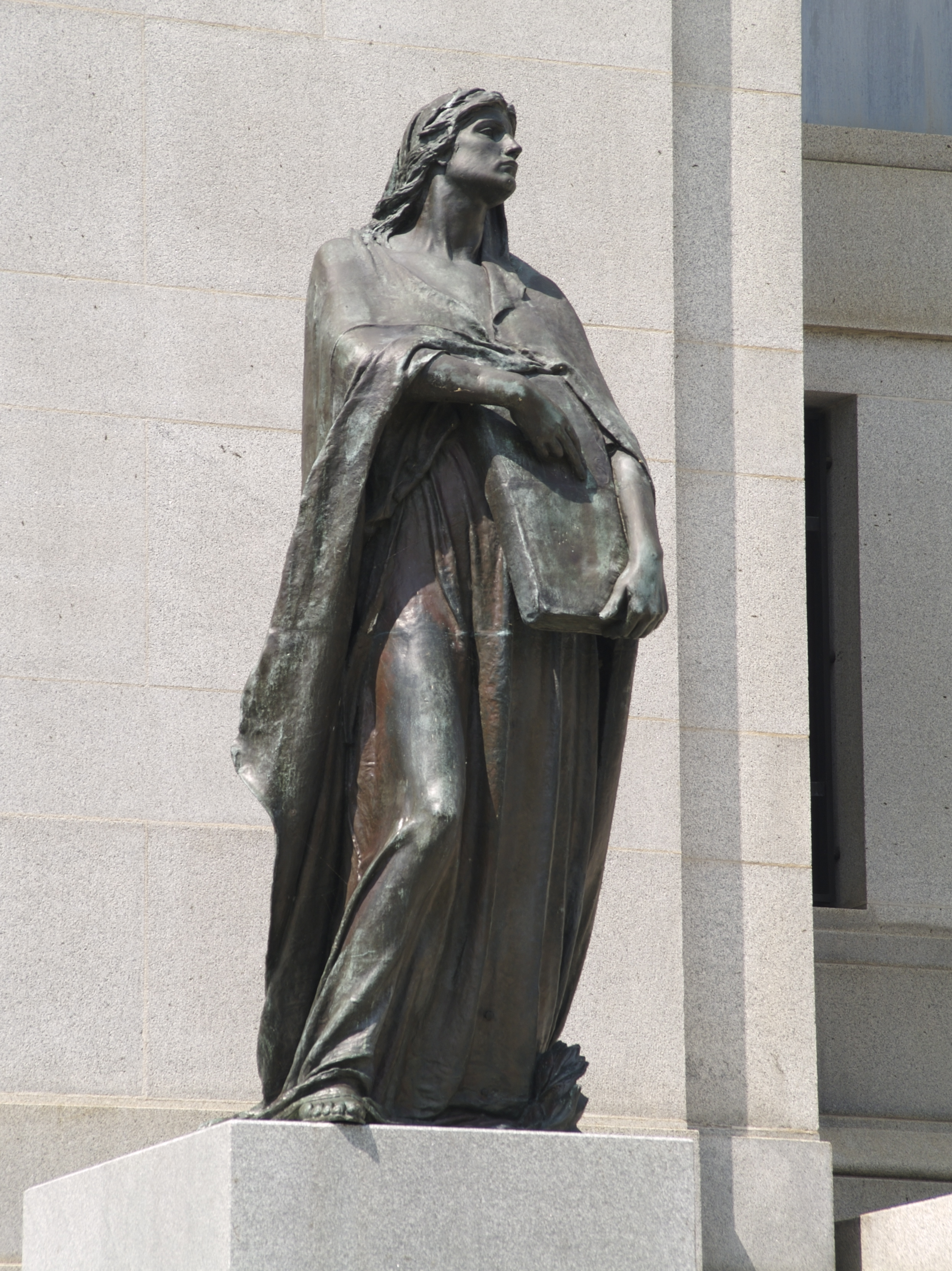
Walter Seymour Allward's Veritas (Truth) outside Supreme Court of Canada, Ottawa, Ontario, Canada

=== Correspondence ===
Correspondence theories emphasize that true beliefs and true statements correspond to the actual state of affairs. This type of theory stresses a relationship between thoughts or statements on one hand, and things or objects on the other. It is a traditional model tracing its origins to ancient Greek philosophers such as Socrates, Plato, and Aristotle. This class of theories holds that the truth or the falsity of a representation is determined in principle entirely by how it relates to "things" according to whether it accurately describes those "things". A classic example of correspondence theory is the statement by the thirteenth century philosopher and theologian Thomas Aquinas: "Veritas est adaequatio rei et intellectus" ("Truth is the adequation of things and intellect"), which Aquinas attributed to the ninth century Neoplatonist Isaac Israeli. Aquinas also restated the theory as: "A judgment is said to be true when it conforms to the external reality".

Correspondence theory centres around the assumption that truth is a matter of accurately copying what is known as "objective reality" and then representing it in thoughts, words, and other symbols. Many modern theorists have stated that this ideal cannot be achieved without analysing additional factors. For example, language plays a role in that all languages have words to represent concepts that are virtually undefined in other languages. The German word Zeitgeist is one such example: one who speaks or understands the language may "know" what it means, but any translation of the word apparently fails to accurately capture its full meaning (this is a problem with many abstract words, especially those derived in agglutinative languages). Thus, some words add an additional parameter to the construction of an accurate truth predicate. Among the philosophers who grappled with this problem is Alfred Tarski, whose semantic theory is summarized further on. (Note: According to a survey of professional philosophers and others on their philosophical views which was carried out in November 2009 (taken by 3226 respondents, including 1803 philosophy faculty members and/or PhDs and 829 philosophy graduate students) 45% of respondents accept or lean toward correspondence theories, 21% accept or lean toward deflationary theories and 14% epistemic theories.)

=== Coherence ===
For coherence theories in general, truth requires a proper fit of elements within a whole system. Very often, coherence is taken to imply something more than simple logical consistency; often there is a demand that the propositions in a coherent system lend mutual inferential support to each other. So, for example, the completeness and comprehensiveness of the underlying set of concepts is a critical factor in judging the validity and usefulness of a coherent system. A central tenet of coherence theories is the idea that truth is primarily a property of whole systems of propositions, and can be ascribed to an individual proposition only in virtue of its relationship to that system as a whole. Among the assortment of perspectives commonly regarded as coherence theory, theorists differ on the question of whether coherence entails many possible true systems of thought or only a single absolute system.

Some variants of coherence theory are claimed to describe the essential and intrinsic properties of formal systems in logic and mathematics. Formal reasoners are content to contemplate axiomatically independent and sometimes mutually contradictory systems side by side, for example, the various alternative geometries. On the whole, coherence theories have been rejected for lacking justification in their application to other areas of truth, especially with respect to assertions about the natural world, empirical data in general, assertions about practical matters of psychology and society, especially when used without support from the other major theories of truth.

Coherence theories distinguish the thought of rationalist philosophers, particularly of Baruch Spinoza, Gottfried Wilhelm Leibniz, and Georg Wilhelm Friedrich Hegel, along with the British philosopher F. H. Bradley. They have found a resurgence also among several proponents of logical positivism, notably Otto Neurath and Carl Hempel.

=== Pragmatic ===
Three influential forms of the pragmatic theory of truth were introduced around the turn of the 20th century by Charles Sanders Peirce, William James, and John Dewey. Although there are wide differences in viewpoint among these and other proponents of pragmatic theory, they all hold that truth is verified and confirmed by the results of putting one's concepts into practice.

Peirce defines it: "Truth is that concordance of an abstract statement with the ideal limit towards which endless investigation would tend to bring scientific belief, which concordance the abstract statement may possess by virtue of the confession of its inaccuracy and one-sidedness, and this confession is an essential ingredient of truth." This statement stresses Peirce's view that ideas of approximation, incompleteness, and partiality, what he describes elsewhere as fallibilism and "reference to the future", are essential to a proper conception of truth. Although Peirce uses words like concordance and correspondence to describe one aspect of the pragmatic sign relation, he is also quite explicit in saying that definitions of truth based on mere correspondence are no more than nominal definitions, which he accords a lower status than real definitions.

James' version of pragmatic theory, while complex, is often summarized by his statement that "the 'true' is only the expedient in our way of thinking, just as the 'right' is only the expedient in our way of behaving." By this, James meant that truth is a quality, the value of which is confirmed by its effectiveness when applying concepts to practice (thus, "pragmatic").

Dewey, less broadly than James but more broadly than Peirce, held that inquiry, whether scientific, technical, sociological, philosophical, or cultural, is self-corrective over time if openly submitted for testing by a community of inquirers in order to clarify, justify, refine, and/or refute proposed truths.

Though not widely known, a new variation of the pragmatic theory was defined and wielded successfully from the 20th century forward. Defined and named by William Ernest Hocking, this variation is known as "negative pragmatism". Essentially, what works may or may not be true, but what fails cannot be true because the truth always works. Philosopher of science Richard Feynman also subscribed to it: "We never are definitely right, we can only be sure we are wrong." This approach incorporates many of the ideas from Peirce, James, and Dewey. For Peirce, the idea of "endless investigation would tend to bring about scientific belief" fits negative pragmatism in that a negative pragmatist would never stop testing. As Feynman noted, an idea or theory "could never be proved right, because tomorrow's experiment might succeed in proving wrong what you thought was right." Similarly, James and Dewey's ideas also ascribe truth to repeated testing which is "self-corrective" over time.

Pragmatism and negative pragmatism are also closely aligned with the coherence theory of truth in that any testing should not be isolated but rather incorporate knowledge from all human endeavors and experience. The universe is a whole and integrated system, and testing should acknowledge and account for its diversity. As Feynman said, "... if it disagrees with experiment, it is wrong."

=== Constructivist ===
Social constructivism holds that truth is constructed by social processes, is historically and culturally specific, and that it is in part shaped through the power struggles within a community. Constructivism views all of our knowledge as "constructed," because it does not reflect any external "transcendent" realities (as a pure correspondence theory might hold). Rather, perceptions of truth are viewed as contingent on convention, human perception, and social experience. It is believed by constructivists that representations of physical and biological reality, including race, sexuality, and gender, are socially constructed.

Giambattista Vico was among the first to claim that history and culture were man-made. Vico's epistemological orientation unfolds in one axiom: verum ipsum factum—"truth itself is constructed". Hegel and Marx were among the other early proponents of the premise that truth is, or can be, socially constructed. Marx, like many critical theorists who followed, did not reject the existence of objective truth, but rather distinguished between true knowledge and knowledge that has been distorted through power or ideology. For Marx, scientific and true knowledge is "in accordance with the dialectical understanding of history" and ideological knowledge is "an epiphenomenal expression of the relation of material forces in a given economic arrangement".

=== Consensus ===
Consensus theory holds that truth is whatever is agreed upon, or in some versions, might come to be agreed upon, by some specified group. Such a group might include all human beings, or a subset thereof consisting of more than one person.

Among the current advocates of consensus theory as a useful accounting of the concept of "truth" is the philosopher Jürgen Habermas. Habermas maintains that truth is what would be agreed upon in an ideal speech situation. Among the current strong critics of consensus theory is the philosopher Nicholas Rescher.

== Deflationary ==
Modern developments in the field of philosophy have resulted in the rise of a new thesis: that the term truth does not denote a real property of sentences or propositions. This thesis is in part a response to the common use of truth predicates (e.g., that some particular thing "... is true") which was particularly prevalent in philosophical discourse on truth in the first half of the 20th century. From this point of view, to assert that "'2 + 2 = 4' is true" is logically equivalent to asserting that "2 + 2 = 4", and the phrase "is true" is—philosophically, if not practically (see: "Michael" example, below)—completely dispensable in this and every other context. In common parlance, truth predicates are not commonly heard, and it would be interpreted as an unusual occurrence were someone to utilize a truth predicate in an everyday conversation when asserting that something is true. Newer perspectives that take this discrepancy into account, and work with sentence structures as actually employed in common discourse, can be broadly described:

- as deflationary theories of truth, since they attempt to deflate the presumed importance of the words "true" or truth,
- as disquotational theories, to draw attention to the disappearance of the quotation marks in cases like the above example, or
- as minimalist theories of truth.

Whichever term is used, deflationary theories can be said to hold in common that "the predicate 'true' is an expressive convenience, not the name of a property requiring deep analysis." Once we have identified the truth predicate's formal features and utility, deflationists argue, we have said all there is to be said about truth. Among the theoretical concerns of these views is to explain away those special cases where it does appear that the concept of truth has peculiar and interesting properties. (See, e.g., Semantic paradoxes, and below.)

The scope of deflationary principles is generally limited to representations that resemble sentences. They do not encompass a broader range of entities that are typically considered true or otherwise. In addition, some deflationists point out that the concept employed in "... is true" formulations does enable us to express things that might otherwise require infinitely long sentences; for example, one cannot express confidence in Michael's accuracy by asserting the endless sentence:

Michael says, 'snow is white' and snow is white, or he says 'roses are red' and roses are red or he says ... etc.

This assertion can instead be succinctly expressed by saying: What Michael says is true.

=== Redundancy and related ===
An early variety of deflationary theory is the redundancy theory of truth, so-called because—in examples like those above, e.g. "snow is white [is true]"—the concept of "truth" is redundant and need not have been articulated; that is, it is merely a word that is traditionally used in conversation or writing, generally for emphasis, but not a word that actually equates to anything in reality. This theory is commonly attributed to Frank P. Ramsey, who held that the use of words like fact and truth was nothing but a roundabout way of asserting a proposition, and that treating these words as separate problems in isolation from judgment was merely a "linguistic muddle".

A variant of redundancy theory is the "disquotational" theory, which uses a modified form of the logician Alfred Tarski's schema: proponents observe that to say that "'P' is true" is to assert "P". A version of this theory was defended by C. J. F. Williams (in his book What is Truth?). Yet another version of deflationism is the prosentential theory of truth, first developed by Dorothy Grover, Joseph Camp, and Nuel Belnap as an elaboration of Ramsey's claims. They argue that utterances such as "that's true", when said in response to (e.g.) "it's raining", are "prosentences"—expressions that merely repeat the content of other expressions. In the same way that it means the same as my dog in the statement "my dog was hungry, so I fed it", that's true is supposed to mean the same as it's raining when the former is said in reply to the latter.

As noted above, proponents of these ideas do not necessarily follow Ramsey in asserting that truth is not a property; rather, they can be understood to say that, for instance, the assertion "P" may well involve a substantial truth—it is only the redundancy involved in statements such as "that's true" (i.e., a prosentence) which is to be minimized.

=== Performative ===
Attributed to philosopher P. F. Strawson is the performative theory of truth which holds that to say "'Snow is white' is true" is to perform the speech act of signaling one's agreement with the claim that snow is white (much like nodding one's head in agreement). The idea that some statements are more actions than communicative statements is not as odd as it may seem. For example, when a wedding couple says "I do" at the appropriate time in a wedding, they are performing the act of taking the other to be their lawful wedded spouse. They are not describing themselves as taking the other, but actually doing so (perhaps the most thorough analysis of such "illocutionary acts" is J. L. Austin, most notably in How to Do Things With Words).

Strawson holds that a similar analysis is applicable to all speech acts, not just illocutionary ones: "To say a statement is true is not to make a statement about a statement, but rather to perform the act of agreeing with, accepting, or endorsing a statement. When one says 'It's true that it's raining,' one asserts no more than 'It's raining.' The function of [the statement] 'It's true that ...' is to agree with, accept, or endorse the statement that 'it's raining.'"

== Pluralism ==
Several of the major theories of truth hold that there is a particular property the having of which makes a belief or proposition true. Pluralist theories of truth assert that there may be more than one property that makes propositions true: ethical propositions might be true by virtue of coherence. Propositions about the physical world might be true by corresponding to the objects and properties they are about.

Some of the pragmatic theories, such as those by Charles Peirce and William James, included aspects of correspondence, coherence and constructivist theories. Crispin Wright argued in his 1992 book Truth and Objectivity that any predicate which satisfied certain platitudes about truth qualified as a truth predicate. In some discourses, Wright argued, the role of the truth predicate might be played by the notion of superassertibility. Michael Lynch, in a 2009 book Truth as One and Many, argued that we should see truth as a functional property capable of being multiply manifested in distinct properties like correspondence or coherence.

== Formal theories ==
=== Logic ===
Logic is concerned with the patterns in reason that can help tell if a proposition is true or not. Logicians use formal languages to express the truths they are concerned with, and as such there is only truth under some interpretation or truth within some logical system.

A logical truth (also called an analytic truth or a necessary truth) is a statement that is true in all logically possible worlds or under all possible interpretations, as contrasted to a fact (also called a synthetic claim or a contingency), which is only true in this world as it has historically unfolded. A proposition such as "If p and q, then p" is considered to be a logical truth because of the meaning of the symbols and words in it and not because of any fact of any particular world. They are such that they could not be untrue.

Degrees of truth in logic may be represented using two or more discrete values, as with bivalent logic (or binary logic), three-valued logic, and other forms of finite-valued logic. Truth in logic can be represented using numbers comprising a continuous range, typically between 0 and 1, as with fuzzy logic and other forms of infinite-valued logic. In general, the concept of representing truth using more than two values is known as many-valued logic.

=== Mathematics ===
There are two main approaches to truth in mathematics. They are the model theory of truth and the proof theory of truth.

Historically, with the nineteenth century development of Boolean algebra, mathematical models of logic began to treat "truth", also represented as "T" or "1", as an arbitrary constant. "Falsity" is also an arbitrary constant, which can be represented as "F" or "0". In propositional logic, these symbols can be manipulated according to a set of axioms and rules of inference, often given in the form of truth tables.

In addition, before the time of Hilbert's program at the turn of the twentieth century, the proof of Gödel's incompleteness theorems and the development of the Church–Turing thesis in the early part of that century, true statements in mathematics were generally assumed to be those statements that are provable in a formal axiomatic system.

The works of Kurt Gödel, Alan Turing, and others shook this assumption, with the development of statements that are true but cannot be proven within the system. Two examples of the latter can be found in Hilbert's problems. Work on Hilbert's 10th problem led in the late twentieth century to the construction of specific Diophantine equations for which it is undecidable whether they have a solution, or even if they do, whether they have a finite or infinite number of solutions. More fundamentally, Hilbert's first problem was on the continuum hypothesis. Gödel and Paul Cohen showed that this hypothesis cannot be proved or disproved using the standard axioms of set theory. In the view of some, then, it is equally reasonable to take either the continuum hypothesis or its negation as a new axiom.

Gödel thought that the ability to perceive the truth of a mathematical or logical proposition is a matter of intuition, an ability he admitted could be ultimately beyond the scope of a formal theory of logic or mathematics and perhaps best considered in the realm of human comprehension and communication. But he commented, "The more I think about language, the more it amazes me that people ever understand each other at all".

=== Tarski's semantics ===
Tarski's theory of truth (named after Alfred Tarski) was developed for formal languages, such as formal logic. Here he restricted it in this way: no language could contain its own truth predicate, that is, the expression is true could only apply to sentences in some other language. The latter he called an object language, the language being talked about. (It may, in turn, have a truth predicate that can be applied to sentences in still another language.) The reason for his restriction was that languages that contain their own truth predicate will contain paradoxical sentences such as, "This sentence is not true". As a result, Tarski held that the semantic theory could not be applied to any natural language, such as English, because they contain their own truth predicates. Donald Davidson used it as the foundation of his truth-conditional semantics and linked it to radical interpretation in a form of coherentism.

Bertrand Russell is credited with noticing the existence of such paradoxes even in the best symbolic formations of mathematics in his day, in particular the paradox that came to be named after him, Russell's paradox. Russell and Whitehead attempted to solve these problems in Principia Mathematica by putting statements into a hierarchy of types, wherein a statement cannot refer to itself, but only to statements lower in the hierarchy. This in turn led to new orders of difficulty regarding the precise natures of types and the structures of conceptually possible type systems that have yet to be resolved to this day.

=== Kripke's semantics ===
Kripke's theory of truth (named after Saul Kripke) contends that a natural language can in fact contain its own truth predicate without giving rise to contradiction. He showed how to construct one as follows:

- Beginning with a subset of sentences of a natural language that contains no occurrences of the expression "is true" (or "is false"). So, The barn is big is included in the subset, but not "The barn is big is true", nor problematic sentences such as "This sentence is false".
- Defining truth just for the sentences in that subset.
- Extending the definition of truth to include sentences that predicate truth or falsity of one of the original subset of sentences. So "The barn is big is true" is now included, but not either "This sentence is false" nor "'The barn is big is true' is true".
- Defining truth for all sentences that predicate truth or falsity of a member of the second set. Imagine this process repeated infinitely, so that truth is defined for The barn is big; then for "The barn is big is true"; then for "'The barn is big is true' is true", and so on.

Truth never gets defined for sentences like This sentence is false, since it was not in the original subset and does not predicate truth of any sentence in the original or any subsequent set. In Kripke's terms, these are "ungrounded." Since these sentences are never assigned either truth or falsehood even if the process is carried out infinitely, Kripke's theory implies that some sentences are neither true nor false. This contradicts the principle of bivalence: every sentence must be either true or false. Since this principle is a key premise in deriving the liar paradox, the paradox is dissolved.

Kripke's semantics are related to the use of elementary toposes and other concepts from category theory in the study of mathematical logic. They provide a choice of formal semantics for intuitionistic logic.

== Ancient Greek philosophy ==
Socrates', Plato's and Aristotle's ideas about truth are seen by some as consistent with correspondence theory. In his Metaphysics, Aristotle stated: "To say of what is that it is not, or of what is not that it is, is false, while to say of what is that it is, and of what is not that it is not, is true". The Stanford Encyclopedia of Philosophy proceeds to say of Aristotle:

... Aristotle sounds much more like a genuine correspondence theorist in the Categories (12b11, 14b14), where he talks of "underlying things" that make statements true and implies that these "things" (pragmata) are logically structured situations or facts (viz., his sitting, his not sitting). Most influential is his claim in De Interpretatione (16a3) that thoughts are "likenesses" (homoiosis) of things. Although he nowhere defines truth in terms of a thought's likeness to a thing or fact, it is clear that such a definition would fit well into his overall philosophy of mind. ...

Similar statements can also be found in Plato's dialogues (Cratylus 385b2, Sophist 263b).

Some Greek philosophers maintained that truth was either not accessible to mortals, or of greatly limited accessibility, forming early philosophical skepticism. Among these were Xenophanes, Democritus, and Pyrrho, the founder of Pyrrhonism, who argued that there was no criterion of truth.

The Epicureans believed that all sense perceptions were true, and that errors arise in how we judge those perceptions.

The Stoics conceived truth as accessible from impressions via cognitive grasping.

== Medieval philosophy ==
=== Avicenna (980–1037) ===
In early Islamic philosophy, Avicenna (Ibn Sina) defined truth in his work The Book of Healing, Book I, Chapter 8, as:

What corresponds in the mind to what is outside it.

Avicenna elaborated on his definition of truth later in Book VIII, Chapter 6:

The truth of a thing is the property of the being of each thing which has been established in it.

This definition is but a rendering of the medieval Latin translation of the work by Simone van Riet. A modern translation of the original Arabic text states:

Truth is also said of the veridical belief in the existence [of something].

=== Aquinas (1225–1274) ===
Reevaluating Avicenna, and also Augustine and Aristotle, Thomas Aquinas stated in his Disputed Questions on Truth:

A natural thing, being placed between two intellects, is called true insofar as it conforms to either. It is said to be true with respect to its conformity with the divine intellect insofar as it fulfills the end to which it was ordained by the divine intellect ... With respect to its conformity with a human intellect, a thing is said to be true insofar as it is such as to cause a true estimate about itself.

Thus, for Aquinas, the truth of the human intellect (logical truth) is based on the truth in things (ontological truth). Following this, he wrote an elegant re-statement of Aristotle's view in his Summa I.16.1:

Veritas est adæquatio intellectus et rei.

(Truth is the conformity of the intellect and things.)

Aquinas also said that real things participate in the act of being of the Creator God who is Subsistent Being, Intelligence, and Truth. Thus, these beings possess the light of intelligibility and are knowable. These things (beings; reality) are the foundation of the truth that is found in the human mind, when it acquires knowledge of things, first through the senses, then through the understanding and the judgement done by reason. For Aquinas, human intelligence ("intus", within and "legere", to read) has the capability to reach the essence and existence of things because it has a non-material, spiritual element, although some moral, educational, and other elements might interfere with its capability.

=== Changing concepts of truth in the Middle Ages ===
Richard Firth Green examined the concept of truth in the later Middle Ages in his A Crisis of Truth, and concludes that roughly during the reign of Richard II of England the very meaning of the concept changes. The idea of the oath, which was so much part and parcel of for instance Romance literature, changes from a subjective concept to a more objective one (in Derek Pearsall's summary). Whereas truth (the "trouthe" of Sir Gawain and the Green Knight) was first "an ethical truth in which truth is understood to reside in persons", in Ricardian England it "transforms ... into a political truth in which truth is understood to reside in documents".

== Modern philosophy ==
=== Kant (1724–1804) ===
Immanuel Kant endorses a definition of truth along the lines of the correspondence theory of truth. Kant writes in the Critique of Pure Reason: "The nominal definition of truth, namely that it is the agreement of cognition with its object, is here granted and presupposed". He denies that this correspondence definition of truth provides us with a test or criterion to establish which judgements are true. He states in his logic lectures:

... Truth, it is said, consists in the agreement of cognition with its object. In consequence of this mere nominal definition, my cognition, to count as true, is supposed to agree with its object. Now I can compare the object with my cognition, however, only by cognizing it. Hence my cognition is supposed to confirm itself, which is far short of being sufficient for truth. For since the object is outside me, the cognition in me, all I can ever pass judgement on is whether my cognition of the object agrees with my cognition of the object.

The ancients called such a circle in explanation a diallelon. And actually the logicians were always reproached with this mistake by the sceptics, who observed that with this definition of truth it is just as when someone makes a statement before a court and in doing so appeals to a witness with whom no one is acquainted, but who wants to establish his credibility by maintaining that the one who called him as witness is an honest man. The accusation was grounded, too. Only the solution of the indicated problem is impossible without qualification and for every man. ...

This passage makes use of his distinction between nominal and real definitions. A nominal definition explains the meaning of a linguistic expression. A real definition describes the essence of certain objects and enables us to determine whether any given item falls within the definition. Kant holds that the definition of truth is merely nominal and, therefore, we cannot employ it to establish which judgements are true. According to Kant, the ancient skeptics were critical of the logicians for holding that, by means of a merely nominal definition of truth, they can establish which judgements are true. They were trying to do something that is "impossible without qualification and for every man".

=== Hegel (1770–1831) ===
G. W. F. Hegel distanced his philosophy from empiricism by presenting truth as a self-moving process, rather than a matter of merely subjective thoughts. Hegel's truth is analogous to an organism in that it is self-determining according to its own inner logic: "Truth is its own self-movement within itself."

=== Schopenhauer (1788–1860) ===
For Arthur Schopenhauer, a judgment is a combination or separation of two or more concepts. If a judgment is to be an expression of knowledge, it must have a sufficient reason or ground by which the judgment could be called true. Truth is the reference of a judgment to something different from itself which is its sufficient reason (ground). Judgments can have material, formal, transcendental, or metalogical truth. A judgment has material truth if its concepts are based on intuitive perceptions that are generated from sensations. If a judgment has its reason (ground) in another judgment, its truth is called logical or formal. If a judgment, of, for example, pure mathematics or pure science, is based on the forms (space, time, causality) of intuitive, empirical knowledge, then the judgment has transcendental truth.

=== Kierkegaard (1813–1855) ===
When Søren Kierkegaard, as his character Johannes Climacus, ends his writings: My thesis was, subjectivity, heartfelt is the truth, he does not advocate for subjectivism in its extreme form (the theory that something is true simply because one believes it to be so), but rather that the objective approach to matters of personal truth cannot shed any light upon that which is most essential to a person's life. Objective truths are concerned with the facts of a person's being, while subjective truths are concerned with a person's way of being. Kierkegaard agrees that objective truths for the study of subjects like mathematics, science, and history are relevant and necessary, but argues that objective truths do not shed any light on a person's inner relationship to existence. At best, these truths can only provide a severely narrowed perspective that has little to do with one's actual experience of life.

While objective truths are final and static, subjective truths are continuing and dynamic. The truth of one's existence is a living, inward, and subjective experience that is always in the process of becoming. The values, morals, and spiritual approaches a person adopts, while not denying the existence of objective truths of those beliefs, can only become truly known when they have been inwardly appropriated through subjective experience. Thus, Kierkegaard criticizes all systematic philosophies which attempt to know life or the truth of existence via theories and objective knowledge about reality. As Kierkegaard claims, human truth is something that is continually occurring, and a human being cannot find truth separate from the subjective experience of one's own existing, defined by the values and fundamental essence that consist of one's way of life.

=== Nietzsche (1844–1900) ===
Friedrich Nietzsche believed the search for truth, or 'the will to truth', was a consequence of the will to power of philosophers. He thought that truth should be used as long as it promoted life and the will to power, and he thought untruth was better than truth if it had this life enhancement as a consequence. As he wrote in Beyond Good and Evil, "The falseness of a judgment is to us not necessarily an objection to a judgment ... The question is to what extent it is life-advancing, life-preserving, species-preserving, perhaps even species-breeding ..." (aphorism 4). He proposed the will to power as a truth only because, according to him, it was the most life-affirming and sincere perspective one could have.

Robert Wicks discusses Nietzsche's basic view of truth as follows:

... Some scholars regard Nietzsche's 1873 unpublished essay, "On Truth and Lies in a Nonmoral Sense" ("Über Wahrheit und Lüge im außermoralischen Sinn") as a keystone in his thought. In this essay, Nietzsche rejects the idea of universal constants, and claims that what we call "truth" is only "a mobile army of metaphors, metonyms, and anthropomorphisms." His view at this time is that arbitrariness completely prevails within human experience: concepts originate via the very artistic transference of nerve stimuli into images; "truth" is nothing more than the invention of fixed conventions for merely practical purposes, especially those of repose, security and consistence. ...

Separately Nietzsche suggested that an ancient, metaphysical belief in the divinity of Truth lies at the heart of and has served as the foundation for the entire subsequent Western intellectual tradition: "But you will have gathered what I am getting at, namely, that it is still a metaphysical faith on which our faith in science rests—that even we knowers of today, we godless anti-metaphysicians still take our fire too, from the flame lit by the thousand-year old faith, the Christian faith which was also Plato's faith, that God is Truth; that Truth is 'Divine' ..."

Moreover, Nietzsche challenges the notion of objective truth, arguing that truths are human creations and serve practical purposes. He wrote, "Truths are illusions about which one has forgotten that this is what they are." He argues that truth is a human invention, arising from the artistic transference of nerve stimuli into images, serving practical purposes like repose, security, and consistency; formed through metaphorical and rhetorical devices, shaped by societal conventions and forgotten origins:

"What, then, is truth? A mobile army of metaphors, metonyms, and anthropomorphisms – in short, a sum of human relations which have been enhanced, transposed, and embellished poetically and rhetorically ..."

Nietzsche argues that truth is always filtered through individual perspectives and shaped by various interests and biases. In "On the Genealogy of Morality," he asserts, "There are no facts, only interpretations." He suggests that truth is subject to constant reinterpretation and change, influenced by shifting cultural and historical contexts as he writes in "Thus Spoke Zarathustra" that "I say unto you: one must still have chaos in oneself to be able to give birth to a dancing star." In the same book, Zarathustra proclaims, "Truths are illusions which we have forgotten are illusions; they are metaphors that have become worn out and have been drained of sensuous force, coins which have lost their embossing and are now considered as metal and no longer as coins."

=== Heidegger (1889–1976) ===
Other philosophers take this common meaning to be secondary and derivative. According to Martin Heidegger, the original meaning and essence of truth in Ancient Greece was unconcealment, or the revealing or bringing of what was previously hidden into the open, as indicated by the original Greek term for truth, aletheia. On this view, the conception of truth as correctness is a later derivation from the concept's original essence, a development Heidegger traces to the Latin term veritas. Owing to the primacy of ontology in Heidegger's philosophy, he considered this truth to lie within Being itself, and already in Being and Time (1927) had identified truth with "being-truth" or the "truth of Being" and partially with the Kantian thing-in-itself in an epistemology essentially concerning a mode of Dasein.

=== Sartre (1905–1980) ===
In Being and Nothingness (1943), partially following Heidegger, Jean-Paul Sartre identified our knowledge of the truth as a relation between the in-itself and for-itself of being - yet simultaneously closely connected in this vein to the data available to the material personhood, in the body, of an individual in their interaction with the world and others - with Sartre's description that "the world is human" allowing him to postulate all truth as strictly understood by self-consciousness as self-consciousness of something, a view also preceded by Henri Bergson in Time and Free Will (1889), the reading of which Sartre had credited for his interest in philosophy. This first existentialist theory, more fully fleshed out in Sartre's essay Truth and Existence (1948), which already demonstrates a more radical departure from Heidegger in its emphasis on the primacy of the idea, already formulated in Being and Nothingness, of existence as preceding essence in its role in the formulation of truth, has nevertheless been critically examined as idealist rather than materialist in its departure from more traditional idealist epistemologies such as those of Ancient Greek philosophy in Plato and Aristotle, and staying as does Heidegger with Kant.

Later, in the Search for a Method (1957), in which Sartre used a unification of existentialism and Marxism that he would later formulate in the Critique of Dialectical Reason (1960), Sartre, with his growing emphasis on the Hegelian totalisation of historicity, posited a conception of truth still defined by its process of relation to a container giving it material meaning, but with specific reference to a role in this broader totalisation, for "subjectivity is neither everything nor nothing; it represents a moment in the objective process (that in which externality is internalised), and this moment is perpetually eliminated only to be perpetually reborn": "For us, truth is something which becomes, it has and will have become. It is a totalisation which is forever being totalised. Particular facts do not signify anything; they are neither true nor false so long as they are not related, through the mediation of various partial totalities, to the totalisation in process." Sartre describes this as a "realistic epistemology", developed out of Marx's ideas but with such a development only possible in an existentialist light, as with the theme of the whole work. In an early segment of the lengthy two-volume Critique of 1960, Sartre continued to describe truth as a "totalising" "truth of history" to be interpreted by a "Marxist historian", whilst his break with Heidegger's epistemological ideas is finalised in the description of a seemingly antinomous "dualism of Being and Truth" as the essence of a truly Marxist epistemology.

=== Camus (1913–1960) ===
The well-regarded French philosopher Albert Camus wrote in his famous essay, The Myth of Sisyphus (1942), that "there are truths but no truth", in fundamental agreement with Nietzsche's perspectivism, and favourably cites Kierkegaard in posing that "no truth is absolute or can render satisfactory an existence that is impossible in itself". Later, in The Rebel (1951), he declared, akin to Sartre, that "the very lowest form of truth" is "the truth of history", but describes this in the context of its abuse and like Kierkegaard in the Concluding Unscientific Postscript he criticizes Hegel in holding a historical attitude "which consists of saying: 'This is truth, which appears to us, however, to be error, but which is true precisely because it happens to be error. As for proof, it is not I, but history, at its conclusion, that will furnish it.'"

=== Peirce (1839–1914) ===
Pragmatists like C. S. Peirce take truth to have some manner of essential relation to human practices for inquiring into and discovering truth, with Peirce himself holding that truth is what human inquiry would find out on a matter, if our practice of inquiry were taken as far as it could profitably go: "The opinion which is fated to be ultimately agreed to by all who investigate, is what we mean by the truth ..."

=== Nishida (1870–1945) ===
According to Kitaro Nishida, "knowledge of things in the world begins with the differentiation of unitary consciousness into knower and known and ends with self and things becoming one again. Such unification takes form not only in knowing but in the valuing (of truth) that directs knowing, the willing that directs action, and the feeling or emotive reach that directs sensing."

=== Fromm (1900–1980) ===
Erich Fromm finds that trying to discuss truth as "absolute truth" is sterile and that emphasis ought to be placed on "optimal truth". He considers truth as stemming from the survival imperative of grasping one's environment physically and intellectually, whereby young children instinctively seek truth so as to orient themselves in "a strange and powerful world". The accuracy of their perceived approximation of the truth will therefore have direct consequences on their ability to deal with their environment. Fromm can be understood to define truth as a functional approximation of reality. His vision of optimal truth is described below:

... the dichotomy between 'absolute = perfect' and 'relative = imperfect' has been superseded in all fields of scientific thought, where "it is generally recognized that there is no absolute truth but nevertheless that there are objectively valid laws and principles".

[...] In that respect, "a scientifically or rationally valid statement means that the power of reason is applied to all the available data of observation without any of them being suppressed or falsified for the sake of the desired result". The history of science is "a history of inadequate and incomplete statements, and every new insight makes possible the recognition of the inadequacies of previous propositions and offers a springboard for creating a more adequate formulation."

[...] As a result "the history of thought is the history of an ever-increasing approximation to the truth. Scientific knowledge is not absolute but optimal; it contains the optimum of truth attainable in a given historical period." Fromm furthermore notes that "different cultures have emphasized various aspects of the truth" and that increasing interaction between cultures allows for these aspects to reconcile and integrate, increasing further the approximation to the truth.

=== Foucault (1926–1984) ===
Truth, says Michel Foucault, is problematic when any attempt is made to see truth as an "objective" quality. He prefers not to use the term truth itself but "Regimes of Truth". In his historical investigations he found truth to be something that was itself a part of, or embedded within, a given power structure. Thus Foucault's view shares much in common with the concepts of Nietzsche. Truth for Foucault is also something that shifts through various episteme throughout history.

=== Baudrillard (1929–2007) ===
Jean Baudrillard considered truth to be largely simulated, that is pretending to have something, as opposed to dissimulation, pretending to not have something. He took his cue from iconoclasts whom he claims knew that images of God demonstrated that God did not exist. Baudrillard wrote in "Precession of the Simulacra":

The simulacrum is never that which conceals the truth—it is the truth which conceals that there is none. The simulacrum is true.
—Ecclesiastes

Some examples of simulacra that Baudrillard cited were: that prisons simulate the "truth" that society is free; scandals (e.g., Watergate) simulate that corruption is corrected; Disney simulates that the U.S. itself is an adult place. Though such examples seem extreme, such extremity is an important part of Baudrillard's theory. For a less extreme example, movies usually end with the bad being punished, humiliated, or otherwise failing, thus affirming for viewers the concept that the good end happily and the bad unhappily, a narrative which implies that the status quo and established power structures are largely legitimate.

=== Other contemporary positions ===
Truthmaker theory is "the branch of metaphysics that explores the relationships between what is true and what exists". It is different from substantive theories of truth in the sense that it does not aim at giving a definition of what truth is. Instead, it has the goal of determining how truth depends on being.
