= T-schema =

Testing device for logical soundness

The T-schema ("truth schema", not to be confused with "Convention T") is used to check if an inductive definition of truth is valid, which lies at the heart of any realisation of Alfred Tarski's semantic theory of truth. Some authors refer to it as the "Equivalence Schema", a synonym introduced by Michael Dummett.

The T-schema is often expressed in natural language, but it can be formalized in many-sorted predicate logic or modal logic; such a formalisation is called a "T-theory." T-theories form the basis of much fundamental work in philosophical logic, where they are applied in several important controversies in analytic philosophy.

As expressed in semi-natural language (where 'S' is the name of the sentence abbreviated to S): 'S' is true if and only if S.

Example: 'snow is white' is true if and only if snow is white.

== The inductive definition ==
By using the schema one can give an inductive definition for the truth of compound sentences. Atomic sentences are assigned truth values disquotationally. For example, the sentence "'Snow is white' is true" becomes materially equivalent with the sentence "snow is white", i.e. 'snow is white' is true if and only if snow is white. Said again, a sentence of the form "A" is true if and only if A is true. The truth of more complex sentences is defined in terms of the components of the sentence:

- A sentence of the form "A and B" is true if and only if A is true and B is true
- A sentence of the form "A or B" is true if and only if A is true or B is true
- A sentence of the form "if A then B" is true if and only if A is false or B is true; see material implication.
- A sentence of the form "not A" is true if and only if A is false
- A sentence of the form "for all x, A(x)" is true if and only if, for every possible value of x, A(x) is true.
- A sentence of the form "for some x, A(x)" is true if and only if, for some possible value of x, A(x) is true.

Predicates for truth that meet all of these criteria are called "satisfaction classes", a notion often defined with respect to a fixed language (such as the language of Peano arithmetic); these classes are considered acceptable definitions for the notion of truth.

== Natural languages ==
Joseph Heath points out that "the analysis of the truth predicate provided by Tarski's Schema T is not capable of handling all occurrences of the truth predicate in natural language. In particular, Schema T treats only "freestanding" uses of the predicate—cases when it is applied to complete sentences." He gives as an "obvious problem" the sentence:

- Everything that Bill believes is true.

Heath argues that analyzing this sentence using T-schema generates the sentence fragment—"everything that Bill believes"—on the righthand side of the logical biconditional.

== See also ==
- Principle of bivalence
- Law of excluded middle
