= Dorothy Grover =

New Zealand philosopher of logic (1936–2017)

Dorothy Lucille Grover (9 September 1936 – 10 November 2017) was a New Zealand philosopher of logic who worked as a professor at the University of Illinois at Chicago. She was known for prosententialism, a deflationary theory of truth in which assertions of the truth of a proposition combine with the proposition to form a pro-sentence, a part of speech which refers to the proposition itself much like a pronoun refers to a noun.

== Life ==
Grover was from the North Island of New Zealand, where she was born on 9 September 1936. After earning a diploma in 1958 from Wellington Teachers' College, she went to Victoria University of Wellington, where she earned a bachelor's degree in 1962 and a master's in 1966; her master's thesis was Entailment: a Study of System E, and a Critical Bibliography of the Subject in General. She came to the University of Pittsburgh for doctoral study, where she worked on logic with Nuel Belnap and Alan Ross Anderson, completing her Ph.D. in 1970. Her dissertation was Topics in Propositional Quantification.

She taught philosophy at the University of Wisconsin–Milwaukee for three years before moving to the University of Illinois at Chicago as a visiting assistant professor in 1972. She eventually became a full professor there, serving as department chair from 1980 to 1985 and from 1991 to 1994, and as Associate Vice Chancellor for Academic Affairs.

During this time in the 90s, Dorothy also engaged DCFS with an interest in adopting a child in need. Being told that most people choose to adopt a new born, Dorothy fostered an older child, Michael, and eventually adopted him.

After retiring as professor emerita in 1998, she returned to New Zealand, where she died in Christchurch on 10 November 2017.. She was survived by her adopted son, Michael Anthony (Tony), and granddaughter Komai Rosa.

== Contributions ==
Grover published her theory of prosententialism in a joint paper, "A prosentential theory of truth", with Belnap and Joseph Lee Camp Jr. in 1975. It was collected together with others of her essays on logic in a single-author 1992 Princeton University Press book, also titled A Prosentential Theory of Truth.

She continued to publish papers on truth and logic after the publication of the book and after her retirement, also making forays into the ethics of decisions involving dead people ("posthumous harm").
