= Semantic theory of truth =

Theory of truth in the philosophy of language

A semantic theory of truth is a theory of truth in the philosophy of language which holds that truth is a property of sentences.

== Origin ==
The semantic conception of truth, which is related in different ways to both the correspondence and deflationary conceptions, is due to work by Polish logician Alfred Tarski. Tarski, in "On the Concept of Truth in Formal Languages" (1935), attempted to formulate a new theory of truth in order to resolve the liar paradox. In the course of this he made several metamathematical discoveries, most notably Tarski's undefinability theorem using the same formal technique Kurt Gödel used in his incompleteness theorems. Roughly, this states that a truth-predicate satisfying Convention T for the sentences of a given language cannot be defined within that language.

== Tarski's theory of truth ==
=== Object language and metalanguage ===
To formulate linguistic theories without semantic paradoxes such as the liar paradox, it is generally necessary to distinguish the language that one is talking about (the object language) from the language that one is using to do the talking (the metalanguage). In the following, quoted text is use of the object language, while unquoted text is use of the metalanguage; a quoted sentence (such as "P") is always the metalanguage's name for a sentence, such that this name is simply the sentence P rendered in the object language. In this way, the metalanguage can be used to talk about the object language; Tarski's theory of truth (Alfred Tarski 1935) demanded that the object language be contained in the metalanguage.

=== Criteria for a definition of truth ===
Tarski requires a satisfactory definition of truth to satisfy both formal correctness and material adequacy.

A definition is formally correct if it is an explicit definition of the truth predicate in the metalanguage where the truth predicate does not occur in the expression defining it, or if it is provably equivalent to an explicit definition of that form.

Tarski's material adequacy condition, also known as Convention T, holds that an adequate definition of truth must entail, for every sentence "P" of the object language, a sentence of the following form (known as "form (T)"):

(1) "P" is true if, and only if, P.

For example,

(2) 'snow is white' is true if and only if snow is white.

These sentences (1 and 2, etc.) have come to be called the "T-sentences". Thus Convention T is a criterion of adequacy for a definition of truth, not a definition of truth. The reason they look trivial is that the object language and the metalanguage are both English; here is an example where the object language is German and the metalanguage is English:

(3) 'Schnee ist weiß' is true if and only if snow is white.

=== Scope of the theory ===
As Tarski originally formulated it, this theory applies only to formal languages, cf. also semantics of first-order logic. He gave a number of reasons for not extending his theory to natural languages, including the problem that there is no systematic way of deciding whether a given sentence of a natural language is well-formed, and that a natural language is closed (that is, it can describe the semantic characteristics of its own elements). But Tarski's approach was extended by Davidson into an approach to theories of meaning for natural languages, which involves treating "truth" as a primitive, rather than a defined, concept. (See truth-conditional semantics.)

=== Definition of truth ===
Tarski developed the theory to give a recursive definition of truth. (See T-schema)

For languages containing quantifiers, the recursion can't be stated in terms of the truth of sentences. Removing a quantifier from a sentence can produce a free variable, which is not a sentence and thus cannot have a truth value. Thus, Tarski introduced the general notion of satisfaction.

==== Satisfaction ====
In the modern model theoretic formulation, suppose $L$ is a first-order language, with $\mathcal{M}$ an $L$-structure with a domain $M$, and with $s$ an assignment that maps variables to elements of $M$.

In general, $\mathcal{M},s\models\varphi$ indicates that the assignment $s$ satisfies the formula $\varphi$ in $\mathcal{M}$. Thereafter, satisfaction can be defined recursively on the construction of formulas.

- Atomic Formula: $R(t_1,\ldots,t_n)$, $\mathcal{M},s\models R(t_1,\ldots,t_n)$ iff. the values of $t_1,\ldots,t_n$ under $\mathcal{M}$ and $s$ form an n-tuple belonging to the relation interpreting R in $\mathcal{M}$.

For example, $\mathcal{M},s\models\neg\varphi$ if and only if $\mathcal{M},s\not\models\varphi$, and $\mathcal{M},s\models\varphi\land\psi$ if and only if $\mathcal{M},s\models\varphi$ and $\mathcal{M},s\models\psi$.

For quantifiers, vary the assignment to the quantified variable.

- For All: $\mathcal{M},s\models\forall x\,\varphi$ iff. $\mathcal{M},s[x\mapsto a]\models\varphi$ for every $a\in M$, where $s[x\mapsto a]$ denotes the assignment that agrees with $s$ on every variable except possibly x, to which it assigns a.
- Exists: $\mathcal{M},s\models\exists x\,\varphi$ if and only if $\mathcal{M},s[x\mapsto a]\models\varphi$ for at least one $a\in M$.

==== Truth for sentences ====
A formula with no free variables is defined as a sentence. Here, satisfaction is not dependent on the choice of assignment. A sentence $\varphi$ is said to be true in $\mathcal{M}$, denoted

$$\mathcal{M}\models\varphi,$$

if $\mathcal{M},s\models\varphi$ for every assignment $s$ (equivalently, some assignment $s$). Note that truth is a special case of satisfaction for sentences.

=== Philosophical interpretation ===
Tarski's semantic conception of truth plays an important role in modern logic and also in contemporary philosophy of language. It is a rather controversial point whether Tarski's semantic theory should be counted either as a correspondence theory or as a deflationary theory.

== Kripke's theory of truth ==
Kripke's theory of truth (Saul Kripke 1975) is an alternative to Tarski's hierarchy of object languages and metalanguages. Based on partial logic (a logic of partially defined truth predicates instead of Tarski's logic of totally defined truth predicates), Kripke allows a language to contain its own truth predicate and constructs an interpretation of that predicate in stages.

=== Motivation ===
Kripke argued that Tarskian hierarchies do not adequately convey the ordinary use of the truth predicate; in a Tarskian hierarchy, a truth predicate in one level can only apply to sentences at lower levels. Kripke observed that natural language speakers don't assign such levels in advance, and that the level required by a statement could depend on empirical fact rather than the syntactic form.

For instance, if a statement asserts that everything another person has said about a subject is false, it may refer to statements which themselves contain truth assertions. In the first statement, a Tarskian hierarchy would need to occur at a level dependent on the semantic complexity of the statements made by the other person. Kripke constructed a notion analogous to levels, but treats them as stages in the construction of the interpretation of a truth predicate rather than as fixed syntactic levels.

=== Construction ===
In the most common construction of the theory, sentences are evaluated with the strong Kleene evaluation scheme. In addition to true and false sentences, some sentences are also allowed to have no initial truth value. Then, iteratively, the interpretation of the truth predicate is expanded. At each stage, sentences whose truth values can be determined from earlier stages receive a truth value. For example, if a sentence $P$ is determined to be true, then at a later stage a sentence asserting "$P$ is true" can be assigned a true value.

=== Fixed points ===
This process can be continued through transfinite induction. Since the strong Kleene evaluation is monotonic, the sequence will eventually reach a fixed point where further applications of the procedure no longer change the extension or anti-extension of the truth predicate. Kripke focuses on the least such fixed point, obtained by beginning with the minimal interpretation of the truth predicate and iterating the construction.

=== Groundedness ===
A sentence that receives a truth value at the least fixed point is called grounded, while those that never receive one are ungrounded. A grounded sentence implies that it has a truth value that can be traced back through the stages of construction to non semantic facts. Sentences such as the liar paradox may remain ungrounded; under the strong Kleene construction, the liar would have no truth value at the least fixed point. This allows Kripke's theory to accommodate semantic self reference without introducing Tarski's explicit hierarchy of languages.

== See also ==
- Disquotational principle
- Semantics of logic
- T-schema
- Triune continuum paradigm
