= Paul Horwich =

British analytic philosopher

- Born: Paul Gordon Horwich; 1947 (age 78–79)

Education
- Education: Cornell University
- Thesis: The Metric and Topology of Time (1975)
- Doctoral advisor: Richard Boyd

Philosophical work
- Era: Contemporary philosophy
- Region: Western philosophy
- School: Analytic
- Main interests: Philosophy of science, metaphysics, epistemology
- Notable ideas: Minimal theory of truth

Paul Gordon Horwich (born 1947) is a British analytic philosopher at New York University, noted for his contributions to philosophy of science, philosophy of physics, the philosophy of language (especially truth and meaning) and the interpretation of Wittgenstein's later philosophy.

== Education and career ==
Horwich read Physics at Oxford, graduating in 1968, and earned his PhD in Philosophy from Cornell University in 1975 with a thesis on The Metric and Topology of Time, under the direction of Richard Boyd. He began his academic career at MIT, where he taught from 1973 until 1994, when he took up a post at University College London. He returned to the U.S. in 2000, to take up a chair at the CUNY Graduate Center. He moved to NYU in 2005.

== Philosophical work ==
In Truth (1990), Horwich presented a detailed defence of the minimalist variant of the deflationary theory of truth. He is opposed to appealing to reference and truth to explicate meaning, and so has defended a naturalistic use theory of meaning in his book Meaning. Other concepts he has advanced are a probabilistic account of scientific methodology and a unified explanation of temporally asymmetric phenomena.

In the context of philosophical speculations about time travel, Horwich coined the term autofanticide for a variant of the grandfather paradox, in which a person goes back in time and deliberately or inadvertently kills their infant self.

== Books ==
- Probability and Evidence (Cambridge University Press, 1982)
- Asymmetries in Time (MIT Press, Bradford Books, 1987)
- Truth (Oxford: Clarendon Press, 1990; 2nd edn. 1998)
- Meaning (Oxford University Press, 1998)
- From a Deflationary Point of View (Oxford University Press, 2004)
- Reflections on Meaning (Oxford University Press, 2005)
- Truth—Meaning—Reality (Oxford University Press, 2010)
- Wittgenstein's Metaphilosophy (Oxford University Press, 2012)
