= T-sentence =

Concept in semantics

In truth-conditional semantics, a T-sentence is a sentence formed from a metatheory or metalanguage of a specific language that entails certain truth conditions for certain sentences of said language (commonly called the object language). It can also defined as "the sentence giving the truth condition of a sentence of an object language." They are typically of the form, "s is a true sentence of a language L iff X", where L is called the object language, and X is called the metalanguage.
