= Use–mention distinction =

Distinction between using a word and mentioning it

A fundamental distinction is made in the field of analytic philosophy between the ordinary use of a term (a word, name, phrase, etc.) and the mention of it as a term itself. The distinction between using and mentioning a term can be illustrated with the English word cheese:

1. Cheese is derived from milk.
2. Cheese is derived from the Old English word ċēse.

The first sentence is a statement about a food made from milk. It uses the term in its standard way to refer to the common dairy product. The second is a statement about the word itself. This second sentence instantiates a mention; it mentions the word but does not use it to refer to anything other than itself.

Invoking the use–mention distinction can sometimes seem pedantic, especially in simple cases where it is obvious what is being referred to. However, scholars argue that many philosophical works have been misguided, or misinterpreted by others, based on a failure to understand or recognize this basic distinction.

== Overview ==
Referring to a word or phrase itself, rather than what the word or phrase normally refers to, is typically accomplished in written English either by invoking single or double quotation marks, or by using italics. In philosophy, single quotation marks are typically used, while in other fields (such as linguistics) italics are more common. Some style authorities, such as Strunk and White, recommend that mentioned words or phrases should be visually distinct. On the other hand, used words or phrases do not carry typographic markings.

The phenomenon of a term's having different references in different contexts was referred to as suppositio (supposition) by medieval logicians. Supposition describes how a term is substituted in a sentence based on its referent. For nouns, a term can be used in different ways:

- With a concrete and real referent: (Note: This use of the word concrete is explained at Abstract and concrete.) "That is my pig." (personal supposition)
- With a concrete but unreal referent: "Santa Claus's pig is very big." (personal supposition)
- With a generic referent: "Any pig breathes air." (simple supposition)
- Metaphorically: "Your grandfather is a pig." (improper supposition)
- As a pure term: "Pig has only three letters." (material supposition)

The use–mention distinction is particularly significant in analytic philosophy. Confusing use with mention can lead to problems, such as category errors.

Self-referential statements also engage the use–mention distinction and are often central to logical paradoxes, such as Quine's paradox. In mathematics, this concept appears in Gödel's incompleteness theorem, where the diagonal lemma plays a crucial role.

== Commentary ==
Stanisław Leśniewski extensively employed this distinction, noting the fallacies that can result from confusing it in Russell and Whitehead's Principia Mathematica.

Donald Davidson argued that quotation cannot always be treated as mere mention, giving examples where quotations carry both use and mention functions.

Douglas Hofstadter explains the distinction between use and mention as follows:

When a word is used to refer to something, it is being used. When a word is quoted, the focus is on its surface aspects, such as typography or phonetics, and it is being mentioned.

Issues arise when a mention itself is mentioned. Notating this with italics or repeated quotation marks can lead to ambiguity.

In Limited Inc, a 1977 response to analytic philosopher John Searle, Jacques Derrida mentioned the distinction as "rather laborious and problematical".

== See also ==
- Haddocks' Eyes – Nickname of the name of a song
- James while John had had had had had had had had had had had a better effect on the teacher – Grammatically correct sentence demonstrating lexical ambiguity
- Map–territory relation – Relationship between an object and a representation of that object
- Metalanguage – Language used to describe another language
- Pointer (computer programming) – Object which stores memory addresses in a computer program
- Quasi-quotation – Linguistic device in formal languages
- Scare quotes – Quotation marks used to indicate non-standard usage
- Sense and reference – Distinction in the philosophy of language
- When a white horse is not a horse – Chinese philosophical dialogue

== Sources ==
- Derrida, Jacques (1977). Limited Inc abc ... in Limited Inc
- Devitt, Michael; Sterelny, Kim (1999). Language and Reality: An Introduction to the Philosophy of Language
- Quine, Willard Van Orman (1951). "4. Use versus mention". Mathematical Logic (Rev. ed.). Harvard University Press. pp. 23–25.
- Wheeler, Samuel (2005). "Davidson as Derridean: Analytic philosophy as deconstruction" in Cardozo Law Review. Vol. 27–2 November 2005 Symposium: Derrida/America, The Present State of America's Europe
