= Pro-sentence =

Linguistic sentence with null subject

A pro-sentence is a function word or expression that substitutes for a whole sentence whose content is recoverable from the context. A pro-sentence is a kind of pro-form and is therefore anaphoric.

== Overview ==
In English, yes, no and okay are common pro-sentences. In response to the question "Does Mars have two moons?", the sentence "Yes" can be understood to abbreviate "Mars does have two moons."

Pro-sentences are sometimes seen as grammatical interjections, since they are capable of very limited syntactical relations. But they can also be classified as a distinct part of speech, given that (other) interjections have meanings of their own and are often described as expressions of feelings or emotions.

=== Yes and no ===
In some languages, the equivalents to yes and no may substitute not only a whole sentence, but also a part of it, either the subject and the verb, or the verb and a complement, and can also constitute a subordinate clause.

The Portuguese word sim (yes) gives a good example:

Q: Ela está em casa? 'Is she at home?'
A: Acredito que sim. 'I believe that she is.' (literally, that yes)

Ela não saiu de casa, mas o John sim.
'She didn't leave home, but John did.' (literally, John yes).

In some languages, such as English, yes rebuts a negative question, whereas no affirms it. However, in Japanese, the equivalents of no (iie, uun, (i)ya) rebut a negative question, whereas the equivalents of yes (hai, ee, un) affirm it.

Q: わかりません でした か？ Wakarimasen deshita ka? 'Did you not understand?'
A: はい、 わかりません でした。 Hai, wakarimasen deshita. 'No, I didn't.', literally 'That's right, I didn't understand'

Some languages have a specific word that rebuts a negative question. German has doch, French has si, Norwegian has jo, Danish has jo, Swedish has jo, and Hungarian has de. The English words "yes" and "no" were originally only used to respond to negative questions, while "yea" and "nay" were the proper responses to affirmative questions; this distinction was lost at some time in Early Modern English.

Q: Bist du nicht müde? 'Aren't you tired?'
A: Doch. Ich gehe bald schlafen. 'Yes. I'm about to go to sleep.'

== In philosophy ==
The prosentential theory of truth developed by Dorothy Grover, Nuel Belnap, and Joseph Camp, and defended more recently by Robert Brandom, holds that sentences like "p" is true and It is true that p should not be understood as ascribing properties to the sentence "p", but as a pro-sentence whose content is the same as that of "p." Brandom calls " . . .is true" a pro-sentence-forming operator.

== See also ==
- Null-subject language – Class of language where a sentence subject is not required
- Null subject parameter – Parameter that determines whether the subject can be dropped from a sentence
