= Truth predicate =

Logic concept

In formal theories of truth, a truth predicate is a fundamental concept based on the sentences of a formal language as interpreted logically. That is, it formalizes the concept that is normally expressed by saying that a sentence, statement or idea "is true."

== Languages which allow a truth predicate ==
Based on "Chomsky Definition", a language is assumed to be a countable set of sentences, each of finite length, and constructed out of a countable set of symbols. A theory of syntax is assumed to introduce symbols, and rules to construct well-formed sentences. A language is called fully interpreted if meanings are attached to its sentences so that they all are either true or false.

A fully interpreted language L which does not have a truth predicate can be extended to a fully interpreted language Ľ that contains a truth predicate T, i.e., the sentence A ↔ T(⌈A⌉) is true for every sentence A of Ľ, where T(⌈A⌉) stands for "the sentence (denoted by) A is true". The main tools to prove this result are ordinary and transfinite induction, recursion methods, and ZF set theory (cf. and).

== See also ==
- Pluralist theory of truth
