= Metaepistemology =

Metaphilosophical study of epistemology

Metaepistemology is the study of the underlying assumptions of epistemology. Epistemology is the theory of knowledge; it is concerned with questions about what knowledge is and how much people can know. Metaepistemology, by contrast, investigates what the aims and methods of epistemology should be, whether there are objective facts about what people know, and related issues.

There are differing views in metaepistemology about the nature and methods of epistemology. Epistemology is usually seen as a field that evaluates what the right things to believe are and prescribes how one ought to form beliefs. Traditional characterisations emphasise the use of reflective thought and intuitions rather than empirical evidence. Other views include the idea that epistemology should use methods more similar to the sciences—like experiments—or that it should focus on the practical impact of the concepts it employs. Feminist epistemology has extended alternative views like these to criticise gendered bias in epistemology.

Metaepistemology investigates epistemic facts, like facts about what people know. According to epistemic realists, facts about knowledge are objective and depend on the way the world is rather than subjective opinion. Anti-realists deny that there are such facts, either by denying their existence altogether or by denying that they are objective. For example, expressivists argue that statements about knowledge do not represent facts, but express attitudes like "this belief is good enough". Views that attempt to find a middle-ground between realism and anti-realism include quasi-realism and constitutivism. Metaepistemology also investigates how it is possible to know about epistemic facts, an area called the epistemology of epistemology.

As a discipline, epistemology does not describe what people actually do believe, it shows what people should believe or what they have justification to believe. Some epistemologists, for instance, assert that everyone has an obligation to only hold beliefs based on evidence. This is a feature known as normativity and it leads to a number of questions in metaepistemology. For example, it is disputed whether people can choose what to believe and whether judgements about evidence can motivate people to believe the right things. Other questions include why and how true beliefs are valuable. Since these problems resemble some issues discussed in the field of metaethics, metaepistemologists examine the similarities and differences between the two disciplines.

== Background ==
=== Terminology ===
Metaepistemology is the branch of epistemology focused on the fundamental assumptions of epistemology. It is a form of metaphilosophy, which means that it takes the philosophical field of epistemology as its subject matter. It reflects on the underlying nature of epistemology as a field and asks higher-order questions about what epistemological questions mean and how they should be answered. Although there is a general agreement that metaepistemology reflects on epistemology in some sense, its exact definition is contested. Some sources define it narrowly as the epistemology of epistemology, including The Blackwell Dictionary of Western Philosophy which states that the role of metaepistemology is in comparing different epistemologies and analysing epistemic concepts. (Note: There is disagreement among philosophers on whether the analysis of epistemic concepts falls under the category of metaepistemology. The Blackwell Dictionary of Western Philosophy cites William Alston in its characterisation of metaepistemology as dealing with the analysis of epistemic concepts like knowledge. However, later theorists like Dominique Kuenzle and Christos Kyriacou have argued that the analysis of knowledge is a clear example of an epistemological question, not a metaepistemological one.) Others emphasise the role of metaepistemology in examining epistemology's goals, methods and criteria of adequacy. (Note: Criteria of adequacy are the criteria used to judge how successful a theory is and to test if it is better than alternative theories.) Metaepistemology is also sometimes characterised as the study of epistemic statements and judgements or as the study of epistemic facts and reasons.

Metaepistemology is a relatively modern term and probably originated at some point in the 20th century. Dominique Kuenzle identifies its first use as a 1959 article by Roderick Firth discussing the views of Roderick Chisholm on the ethics of belief. Early explorations into the concept of metaepistemology were undertaken by William Alston and Jonathan Dancy in the late 1970s and early 1980s, (Note: See Alston 1978 and Dancy 1982.) with Alston defining metaepistemology in 1978 as the study of "the conceptual and methodological foundations of [epistemology]." Kuenzle notes only a few other uses of the term prior to 2017, but Christos Kyriacou and Robin McKenna state that increasing interest in the field arose around the beginning of the 21st century due to a growing recognition that epistemology is a normative field like ethics. Like other terms in philosophy, metaepistemology pre-dates the name given to it; Kyriacou traces its study back to Plato's discussions of the value and source of knowledge, and ancient Greek scepticism.

=== Relationship between epistemology and metaepistemology ===
The divisions between metaepistemology and the other branches of epistemology—as well as their connections with one another—are debated by metaepistemologists. For example, the Internet Encyclopedia of Philosophy divides epistemology into three branches, analogous to the three branches of ethics: metaepistemology, normative epistemology and applied epistemology. Richard Fumerton instead divides epistemology into metaepistemology and applied epistemology, and objects to the idea of a branch of normative epistemology.

Views about the relationship between metaepistemology and the other branches of epistemology fall into two groups: autonomy and interdependency. The autonomy view claims that metaepistemology is an entirely independent branch of epistemology—it neither depends on the other branches nor do they depend on it. According to this view, a person being a metaepistemological realist or anti-realist has no implications for what views they should accept in epistemology. The interdependency view, on the other hand, claims that there are strong theoretical interdependencies between the branches and a epistemological view may even directly follow from a metaepistemological one. Furthermore, according to the latter view, metaepistemology may have relevance to issues of practical importance like climate change scepticism. (Note: An example of how metaepistemology could be relevant to climate change scepticism is the normativity of epistemology. Whether one truly ought to believe in climate change arguably depends on the extent to which epistemology is normative, and this is debated by metaepistemologists.)

== Nature and methodology of epistemology ==
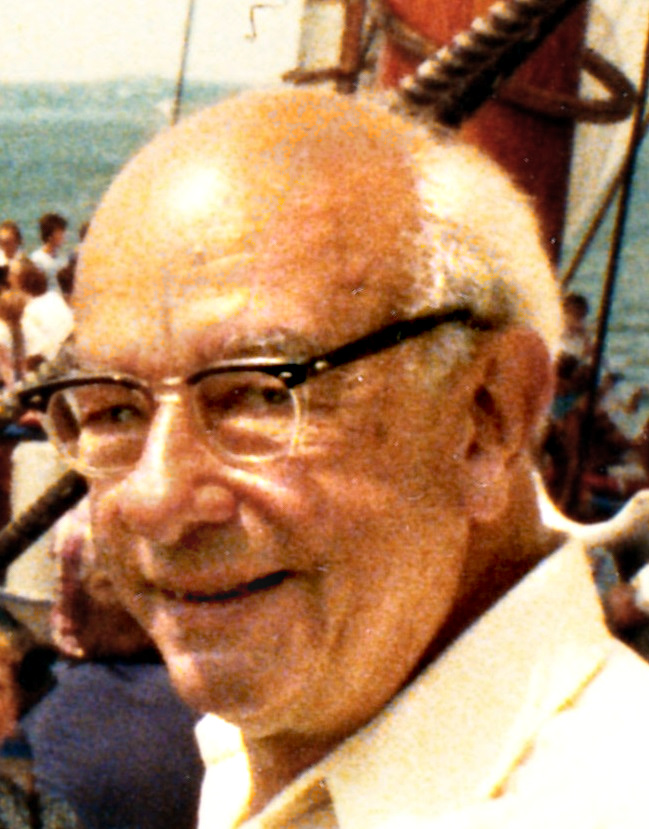
W. V. Quine challenged traditional epistemology with his philosophy of naturalised epistemology.

Epistemology is commonly defined as the "theory of knowledge". In this sense, it investigates the nature of knowledge and how far it extends, but epistemologists also investigate other concepts such as justification, understanding and rationality. To account for this diversity of interests, epistemology is sometimes characterised as two connected projects: gnoseology concerned with the theory of knowledge, and intellectual ethics concerned with guiding inquiry according to proper intellectual norms. As the central focus of epistemology, knowledge is generally understood in terms of full belief, but credences or degrees of belief are also important concepts. These are the subjective probabilities people attach to different possible claims and feature most prominently in Bayesian epistemology, which uses formal mathematical methods to investigate epistemological questions.

Epistemology is traditionally viewed as an a priori discipline focused on reflective thought rather than empirical evidence, and as autonomous from the results and methods of the sciences. It is also generally seen as a normative discipline, evaluating beliefs as either justified or unjustified and prescribing the proper way to form beliefs. Alternative views of epistemology may deny some or all of the traditional features of epistemology. For example, naturalistic epistemology denies the autonomy of epistemology, holding that epistemology should be informed by either the methods or ontology of science. In its most radical form, associated in particular with the naturalised epistemology of W. V. Quine, it claims that epistemology should be replaced with empirical disciplines such as psychology or cognitive science. (Note: See also Quine 1969.) Advocates of experimental philosophy claim that epistemology should use a posteriori methods such as experiments and empirical data, either as additional methods alongside traditional philosophical techniques or as a complete replacement.

Methods associated with traditional epistemology include the use of intuitions about particular cases or thought experiments to support epistemological theories or ideas. A prominent example in epistemology is the use of intuitions regarding Gettier cases to test theories of knowledge. These are hypothetical cases in which candidate conditions for knowledge are met but intuitively do not appear to count as knowledge due to luck being involved. (Note: For more on Gettier cases, see Ichikawa & Steup 2024 and Hetherington n.d.. For Gettier's original paper, see Gettier 1963.) Intuitions are also used in the process of reflective equilibrium, in which conflicting intuitions are brought into alignment by modifying or removing intuitions until they form a coherent system of beliefs.

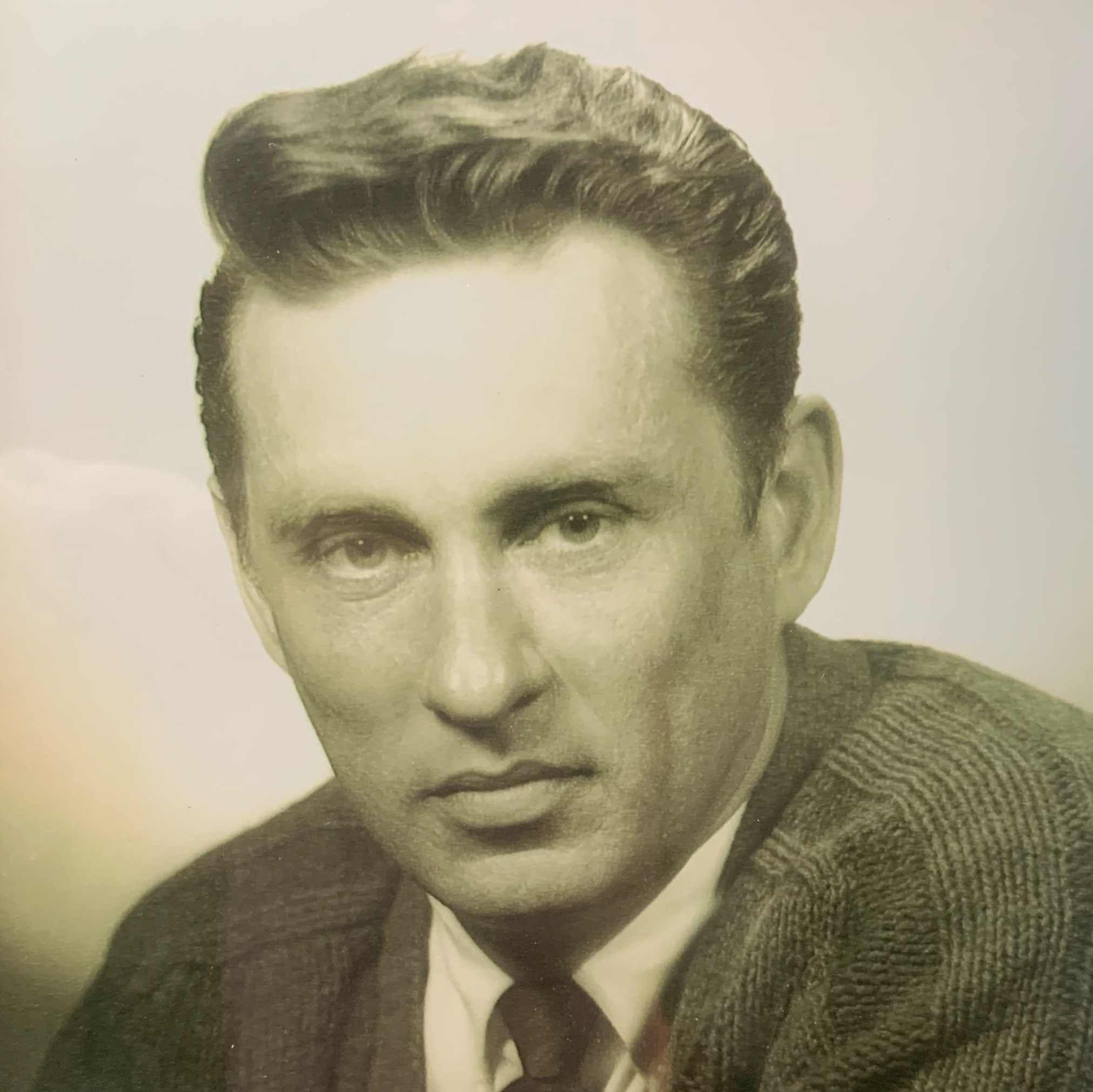
A number of issues in the methodology of epistemology have been influenced by Gettier cases named after Edmund Gettier.

Related to the use of intuitions is the method of analysis to clarify epistemic terms. Traditionally, analysis in epistemology has been seen as conceptual analysis, which attempts to clarify concepts such as knowledge by providing necessary and sufficient conditions for their use. A similar view sees analysis as semantic or linguistic analysis, in which the way terms are actually used is tracked to try and reveal their meaning. However, particularly due to problems associated with Gettier cases, philosophers including Timothy Williamson and Hilary Kornblith have argued that epistemologists should be concerned with the underlying phenomena of epistemology rather than words and concepts. According to this viewpoint, analysis in epistemology should be metaphysical analysis, which aims at understanding the nature of the thing being investigated.

An alternative methodology to philosophical analysis is explication. Explication aims to clarify a term by replacing it with a more precisely defined technical term. The technical term should remain close in meaning to the original term but can deviate from intuitions to fulfil theoretical or practical goals. For example, the scientific term "fish" excludes whales to better capture the facts of biology, even if whales may be included in the colloquial or pre-scientific meaning of the word. Practical explication, also known as a function-first approach, identifies the purpose or function of a term to clarify its meaning. Proposed functions of the term knowledge, for example, include its role in identifying reliable sources of information and in marking an end-point for inquiry. This approach is associated with the pragmatism of Charles Sanders Peirce and neopragmatists such as Mark Kaplan and Edward Craig. (Note: For example, see Craig 1990 and Kaplan 1985.) Inspired by Craig, Jonathan Weinberg has proposed an explicitly metaepistemological pragmatism that allows epistemic concepts to be redesigned to fulfil practical goals, resulting in a method of "analysis-by-imagined-reconstruction". (Note: See Weinberg 2006.)

Another methodological issue in epistemology is the debate between particularists and generalists. According to particularists, particular cases of knowledge need to be identified before the general principles underlying knowledge can be understood. Generalists, on the other hand, argue that the principles underlying knowledge are required to reliably identify cases. This debate is made more complicated by the fact that each question seems to depend on the other; a general theory of knowledge is needed to know if particular cases count as knowledge, but a theory of knowledge is potentially arbitrary without being tested against particular cases. This is known as the problem of the criterion. (Note: For more on the problem of the criterion, see McCain n.d. and Chisholm 1973.) Generalism was popular in modern philosophy, but by the middle of the 20th century, particularism was the dominant view. In the 21st century, particularism became less dominant after a period driven by responses to Gettier cases, and epistemic methodology widened to include considerations regarding the value of knowledge and the relationships between knowledge and related concepts such as assertion.

The value of knowledge can be used in the methodology of epistemology to test theories of knowledge. For example, any theory that fails to explain why knowledge is so valuable can be seen as failing to explain what knowledge truly is. This is because such a theory cannot explain why knowledge is more valuable than mere true opinions. One explanation for the value of knowledge dating back to Plato is that knowledge is fixed onto the truth whilst true opinions can be unstable. Another theory, virtue epistemology, espoused by philosophers such as Ernest Sosa and Linda Zagzebski, argues that knowledge is the result of virtuous character traits—like open-mindedness and keen perception—and this explains the value of knowledge. One controversy surrounding this point of view, deriving from situationism in psychology, is whether character traits are fixed or stable.

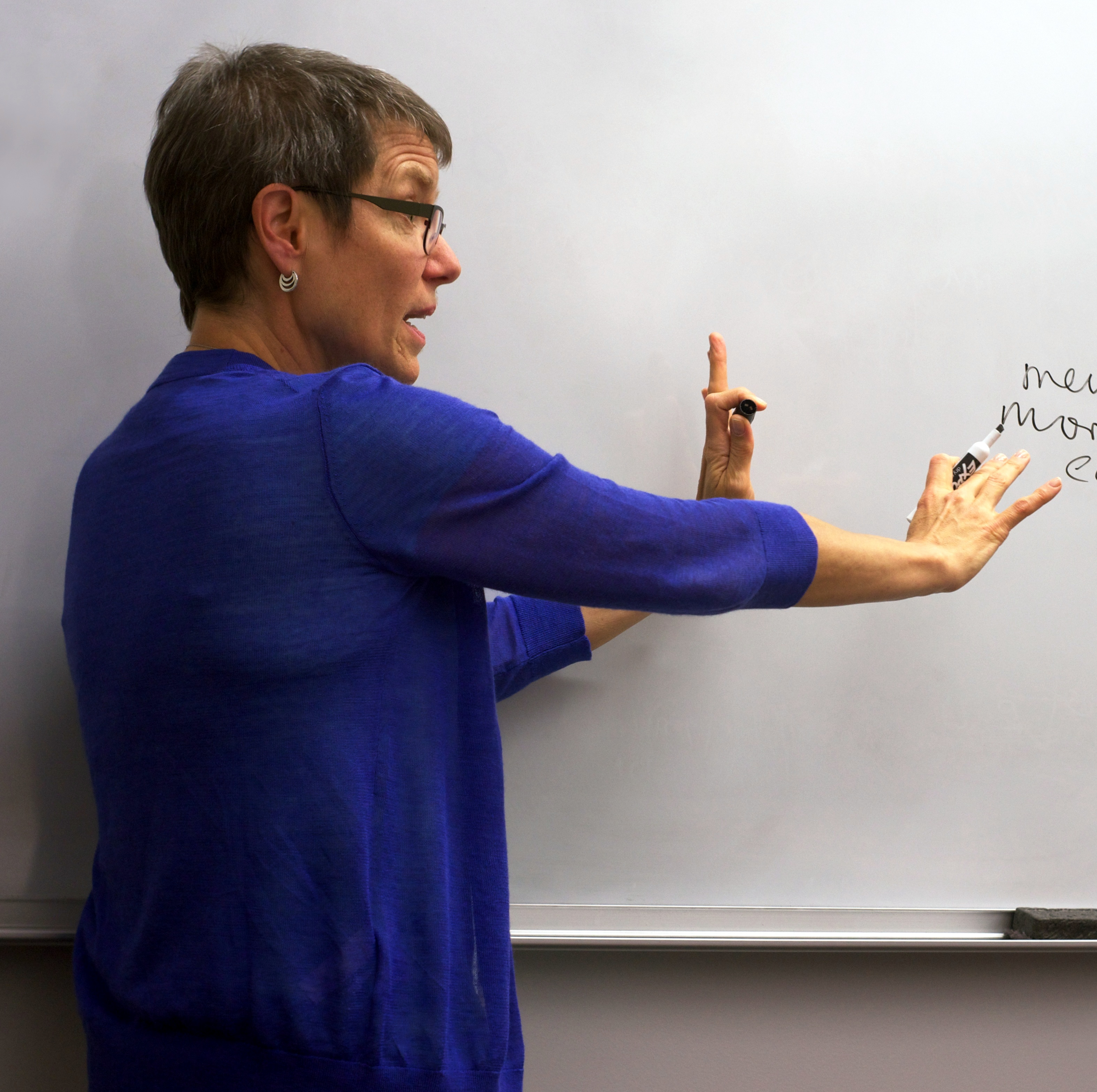
Sally Haslanger has argued that epistemic concepts should be reformulated from a feminist lens to remove androcentric bias.

According to feminist epistemology, epistemology has been historically rooted in androcentric bias. An example cited by some feminist philosophers is epistemology's focus on propositional knowledge and devaluing of emotional and practical forms of knowledge stereotyped as feminine. Feminists typically argue that this bias should be replaced with feminist values rather than a value-free or "disinterested" methodology, and have attempted to show that feminist values are preferable. For example, Louise Antony has embraced feminist naturalised epistemology and argued that feminist ideals produce empirically better theories. (Note: See Antony 2022. For more feminist views on naturalism, see Hankinson Nelson & Nelson 2003.) Meanwhile, Sally Haslanger has argued from a pragmatist perspective that epistemic concepts can be reformed based on feminist values to better serve their purposes within epistemology. (Note: For example, see Haslanger 1999.)

== Epistemic realism and anti-realism ==
As in metaethics, views about the metaphysics of epistemology can be divided into epistemic realism and anti-realism. In its most minimal form, epistemic realism claims that there are mind-independent epistemic facts. This implies that statements about what a person knows are objectively true or false, and their truth or falsity depends on the way the world is rather than personal opinion or cultural consensus. (Note: Epistemic facts also include facts about other concepts, like facts about rationality, wisdom, or what a person is justified in believing.) Epistemic realism generally takes these epistemic facts to be normative and to provide unconditional or categorical reasons for belief. In other words, these facts have authority over what a person should believe, regardless of their goals or desires. (Note: Prominent defenders of epistemic realism include Terence Cuneo (2007) and Paul Boghossian (2006).) Epistemic realists can be divided into reductionists, who believe that epistemic facts can be reduced to descriptive or natural facts, and antireductionists, who believe that epistemic facts are irreducibly normative. (Note: Some philosophers, such as Terence Cuneo, do not categorise reductionism as a form of realism. According to Cuneo, despite reductionism accepting epistemic facts in some sense, it denies a common-sense understanding of epistemology. Therefore, for Cuneo, it denies a key commitment of epistemic realism.)

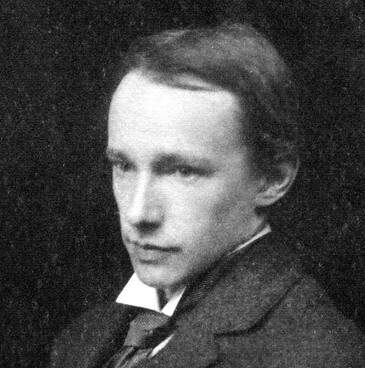
G. E. Moore's open question argument has been influential in metaepistemology.

Reductionists can be further divided into those who accept conceptual analysis and those who think that epistemic reductions can only be found empirically. (Note: These are analytic and synthetic reductionists, respectively.) For example, Hilary Kornblith argues that knowledge is a natural kind and should therefore be investigated empirically, akin to other natural kinds like gold. (Note: See Kornblith 2002.) An argument against reductionism is G. E. Moore's open question argument in metaethics, which has been adapted for epistemology. It claims that statements such as "this belief is reliably produced, but is it knowledge?" are open questions, which shows that knowledge is not identical in meaning to any natural property. (Note: Technically, this argument is directed specifically at analytic reductionists and not synthetic reductionists since they deny the adequacy of conceptual analysis. They can, therefore, explain the semantic openness of epistemic properties as a failing of a priori methods while maintaining that a posteriori reduction is still possible.)

Epistemic anti-realists deny the existence of mind-independent epistemic facts. Epistemic error theorists agree with realists that the truth or falsity of epistemic statements depend on epistemic facts. But they argue that there are no epistemic facts, so all epistemic statements are false. Some other forms of anti-realism accept the existence of epistemic facts, but deny they are independent of human desires or customs. For example, epistemic instrumentalism takes epistemic facts to depend on goals or desires—such as the desire to only believe the truth—and hence denies categorical reasons for belief in favour of hypothetical or instrumental reasons. Epistemic relativism holds that epistemic truths are relative to some other factor such as culture.

Knowledge according to contextualism
Context	Knowledge attributions
Low stakes – Knowledge does not have practical consequences	Low requirement on evidence for a belief to count as knowledge
High stakes – Knowledge has some practical importance	Greater requirement on evidence for a belief to count as knowledge

Some epistemologists view epistemic contextualism as a form of relativism. It asserts that the accuracy of knowledge claims can vary depending on the context in which they are used. In other words, it is possible for a knowledge claim to be true in a scenario with low standards but false in one with high standards, even if the evidence is the same. For example, according to contextualism, whether someone knows that a flight has a connection in a certain city depends not just on their evidence but also on the context. So, a person might know about the connection on the basis of an overheard conversation if it has no practical importance to them. But if they urgently need to meet someone in that city, then they would have to do further checks before they can confidently say they know one way or the other. (Note: This example is originally due to Stewart Cohen (1999).) A view sometimes called new age relativism goes even further by claiming that knowledge claims can be assessed in many different ways, even if the standards are the same. In opposition to all forms of contextualism and relativism is invariantism. It states that knowledge claims are absolutely true or false and do not change from context to context.

Another view is expressivism. Like error theory, it denies the existence of epistemic facts, but it also denies that epistemic statements have any representational content. In other words, it denies that epistemic statements even attempt to accurately describe facts. (Note: According to another interpretation, expressivism does not necessarily deny the existence of epistemic facts. Instead, it can be viewed as changing the subject from realist concerns about ontology to questions about epistemic language. In this way, the expressivist remains neutral on the existence of epistemic facts by avoiding questions about epistemic metaphysics altogether.) It follows from this that epistemic statements cannot be true or false, since they do not represent the world as being a particular way, an idea called epistemic non-cognitivism. It constitutes a major departure from the realist's semantic framework of cognitivism, which claims that epistemic statements attempt to accurately represent facts. According to non-cognitivist semantics, epistemic statements are instead used to express desires or attitudes like approval or disapproval. For example, some expressivists interpret knowledge claims as expressing the attitude that one's belief is "good enough". (Note: For more on epistemic expressivism, see Chrisman 2012.)

One form of expressivism is called quasi-realism. It attempts to recover aspects of realism from within an expressivist framework. In particular, it adopts minimal or deflationary views about truth, facts and properties. According to this approach, truth and facthood are linguistic devices; to say "it is a fact that S knows that p" is not to assert there are facts, it is just to emphasise one's confidence that "S knows that p". In this way, quasi-realists attempt to recover the language of realism without accepting realist metaphysics. A view that seeks to find a middle ground between realism and anti-realism is constitutivism, sometimes called constructivism. Defended by philosophers such as Christine Korsgaard, it argues that normative facts are grounded by facts about agents, such as facts about their desires or about the pre-conditions of their agency. Within metaepistemology, this view generally argues that it is a constitutive part of the concept of belief that it aims at the truth. Proponents argue this view retains some benefits of both realism and anti-realism; it generates epistemic objectivity and categorical reasons for belief without the metaphysical costs of realism.

The debate between realism and anti-realism includes a number of different arguments. Epistemic realism has been the default presupposition of mainstream epistemology and so has not received many explicit defences. Those that exist generally focus on the alleged incoherence of anti-realism. For instance, some realists argue error theory is self-defeating since it entails that there are no reasons for belief, and therefore no reasons to believe error theory. A similar argument against expressivism states that it depends on taking a perspective external to epistemic inquiry, but to argue for expressivism requires engaging in epistemic inquiry. (Note: Another problem for expressivism, more traditionally raised in metaethics, is the Frege–Geach problem. This is the problem that epistemic expressivism does not seem well-positioned to explain complex epistemic statements of inferences, since it cannot explain the logical validity of epistemic arguments.) Realism has its own challenges though. For example, evolutionary debunking arguments due to Sharon Street claim that people's epistemic attitudes can be explained by Darwinian evolution and that evolution has no reason to track epistemic facts. (Note: For example, see Street 2009.) Some philosophers also argue that epistemic realism cannot account for widespread disagreement about epistemology.

== Epistemology of epistemology ==
The epistemology of epistemology asks how there is knowledge about epistemic facts and reasons. (Note: Some definitions restrict metaepistemology to the epistemology of epistemology. However, in general, this subject is part of a range of issues in metaepistemology including the metaphysics, semantics and psychology of epistemology.) An important distinction related to this question is between epistemic internalism and externalism. (Note: Although internalism and externalism are relevant to metaepistemology, there is debate over whether these views are themselves a part of metaepistemology or whether they are views in standard, first-order epistemology.) According to a common characterisation, internalism is the view that justification consists in having cognitively accessible reasons for a belief. Another internalist view, called mentalism, claims that justification depends on mental states; for example, an agent must have a mental state that counts as evidence for a belief for it to be justified. Externalism is the denial of internalism. It holds that justification does not always need cognitively accessible reasons and may not always depend on mental states. A common externalist view is reliabilism, which views justification as a question of whether a belief was formed through a reliable process.

Since internalism explains epistemic reasons as reflectively accessible mental states, it entails that epistemic facts can in principle be known through reflection. Externalism rejects this focus on reasons and reflection as an overly intellectualised account of everyday knowledge. It usually holds that access to reasons is not required for knowledge and places focus instead on reliable cognitive processes. However, the rejection of reasons as central to knowledge is sometimes seen as a dismissal of epistemic normativity altogether. Some externalist accounts such as Ernest Sosa's take a more moderate approach by supplementing a basic form of reliabilist knowledge with a reflective knowledge concerned with reasons and the coherence of beliefs.

Also related to the internalism–externalism debate is the position of metaepistemological scepticism, defended most prominently by Richard Fumerton and Barry Stroud. (Note: For example, see Fumerton 1995 and Stroud 1984.) Metaepistemological scepticism claims that it is impossible to form a satisfying response to the problem of scepticism, meaning that it is impossible to explain how anyone could have any knowledge. It claims that externalist theories of knowledge are not philosophically satisfying because, at least according to Fumerton, knowledge requires direct cognitive access to facts, not just a reliable process. However, metaepistemological sceptics also find internalist theories inadequate. They argue that direct access to the external world is impossible or that responses relying on direct access are problematically circular. So for metaepistemological scepticism, all possible responses fail to solve the problem of scepticism. Opponents of metaepistemological scepticism include Michael Williams, who argues that the questions raised by metaepistemological sceptics are ill-formed or unnatural in some way. (Note: See also Williams 1996.)

Another issue relevant to the epistemology of epistemology is the reliability of intuitions about epistemic facts. Some philosophers argue that intuitions can be unreliable and often differ from person to person. For example, some empirical studies from experimental philosophers have indicated that intuitions are unstable and are influenced by philosophically irrelevant factors such as personality or cultural background, although these results are disputed. According to more traditional epistemologists, scepticism of intuitions is self-defeating since it leaves no way to evaluate the strength of arguments or evidence.

== Normativity and reasons for belief ==
Epistemology is widely agreed to be a normative discipline. It investigates what ought to be believed and when beliefs are justified or unjustified. A common way to understand justification is in terms of deontic concepts like permission and obligation. For example, some epistemologists hold that there is an obligation to only form beliefs based on evidence. Opponents of a deontic understanding of justification such as William Alston argue that there is no voluntary control over belief, so it is inappropriate to apply concepts like ought or obligation to it. (Note: For example, see Alston 1988.) Proponents of a deontic conception have responded in a number of ways. Some argue that at least some beliefs are under direct voluntary control while others argue that indirect influence is enough to support deontic concepts.

Deeply related to the notion of normativity are reasons. (Note: According to one view, called reasons-first epistemology, reasons are so fundamental that they alone underlie all epistemic normativity. The reasons-first view is popular in metaethics, but less popular in epistemology where many theorists view other normative notions as equally important.) For example, some epistemologists explain normative ideas like a belief being justified in terms of there being reasons for holding that belief, such as evidence in its favour. Epistemic reasons are usually identified as reasons for belief (Note: or more broadly for doxastic attitudes) as opposed to reasons for actions, which are in the domain of practical reason. (Note: The mainstream view is that all epistemic reasons are reasons for belief and all practical reasons are reasons for action. However, there is some debate over whether there could be practical reasons for belief. Pascal's wager, for example, indicates that there could be practical reasons for belief such as a reason to believe in God's existence based on its practical benefits. Epistemic reasons for action have been less discussed, although there have been some defences. A related type of reasons are zetetic reasons, which are reasons governing inquiry. Some philosophers argue that zetetic reasons are epistemic reasons, whilst others argue the two are different and can even be in tension with one another.) Furthermore, epistemic reasons are reasons for belief from an epistemic point of view—that is, reasons deriving from an epistemic aim like knowledge rather than a purely pragmatic aim like self-enrichment. Normative reasons are generally distinguished from explanatory reasons, which explain why somebody holds a belief. They are also distinguished from motivational reasons, which are the subjective reasons that moved a person to have a certain belief. Normative reasons are concerned not with why a person holds a belief, but the things that favour that belief over another and make it the correct thing to believe.

One question in metaepistemology concerns what the source of epistemic normativity is. According to instrumentalists, epistemic reasons depend on agents' goals or desires and are hence instrumental reasons. Intrinsicalists, by contrast, hold that epistemic reasons are brutely intrinsically normative and on this basis generally accept categorical reasons for belief. One challenge to instrumentalism is the problem of accounting for evidence of trivial or counterproductive beliefs. For example, if a person learns the ending to a movie despite wanting to avoid spoilers, they have good reasons to believe how it will end even though they do not have a corresponding goal or desire. (Note: This example is due to Kelly 2003. See also Leite 2007 and Kelly 2007.) Instrumentalists have responded to this challenge by arguing that gaining true beliefs always serves some epistemic interest or that the reasons in such cases are not truly normative reasons.

A theory that attempts to explain the normativity found in epistemology is epistemic consequentialism. Similar to consequentialism in ethics, epistemic consequentialism claims that the epistemic rightness of a belief depends on the value of its consequences. This view is often paired with the idea that epistemic value depends on the accuracy of beliefs; that is, true beliefs have intrinsic value and false beliefs have intrinsic disvalue. Thus, epistemic consequentialism is generally taken to claim that something is epistemically right if it maximises the number of true beliefs and minimises the number of false beliefs. A prominent objection to this combination of views is the idea that it allows trade-offs between beliefs, such as believing something inaccurate today if it will contribute to a greater number of accurate beliefs in the future.

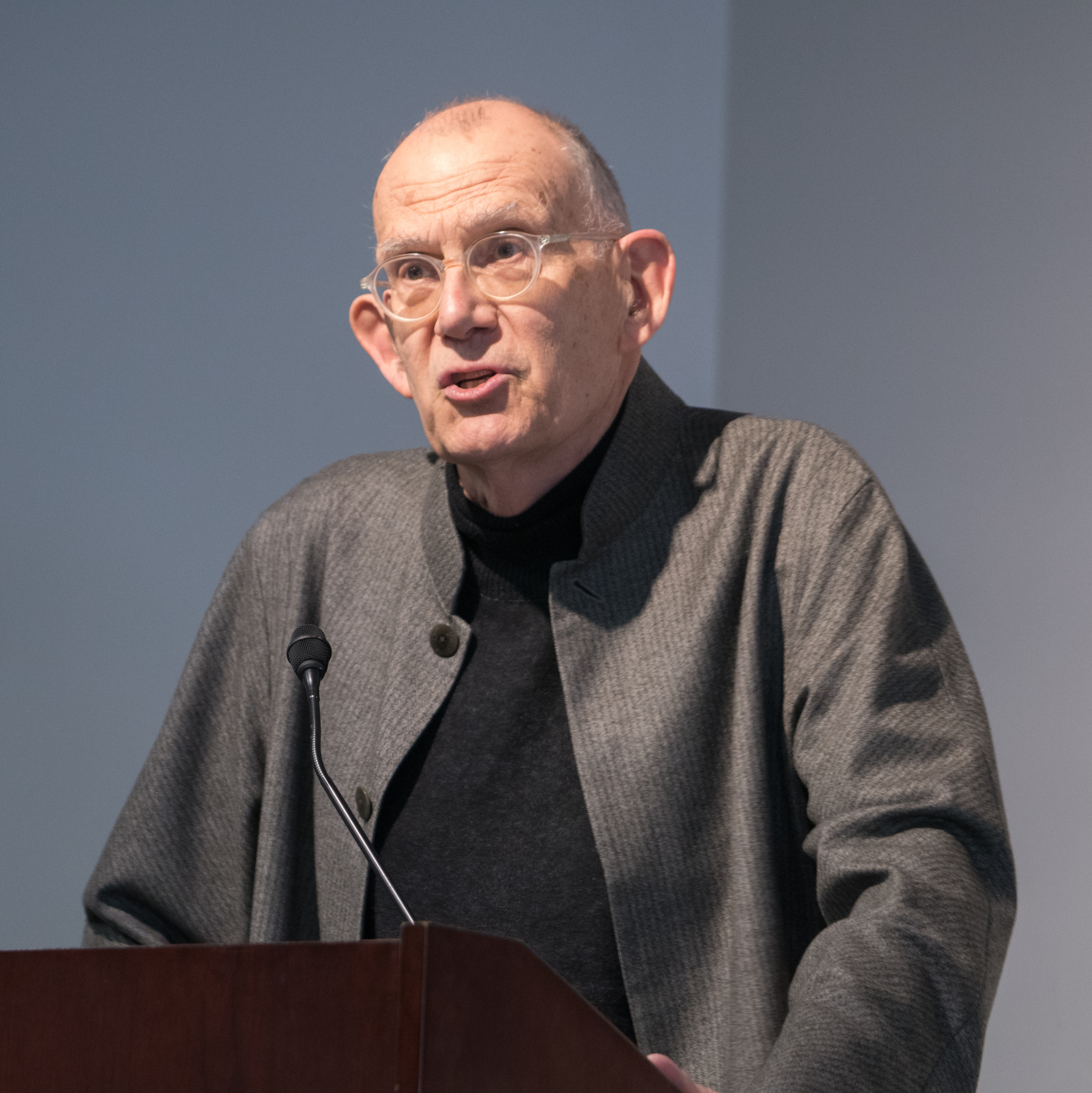
T. M. Scanlon argues for a "buck-passing" account of value.

Another question is what it means for something to be epistemically valuable. Some philosophers like T. M. Scanlon think that value can be defined in terms of properties that elicit pro- or con-attitudes. So-called "buck-passing accounts" deny the view that some properties are intrinsically valuable, instead "passing the buck" to more basic attitude-providing properties. In particular, the buck-passing account of epistemic value claims that something is epistemically valuable if it has properties that provide reasons to believe it. One objection to buck-passing accounts is the "wrong kind of reasons" problem. According to this problem, there can be reasons to have an attitude towards something that is unrelated to its value. For example, somebody may have reason to believe something because they find it comforting, but this is unrelated to its epistemic value.

The connection between normativity and motivation in metaepistemology is debated. Judgement internalists argue that normative epistemic judgements (like "p is justified") always involve motivation (like being motivated to believe that p), while externalists believe they can sometimes fail to motivate beliefs. (Note: Talk of beliefs being motivated by normative epistemic judgements should not be confused with the idea of motivated beliefs in psychology. Motivated beliefs in psychology result from irrational thought processes in which something is believed based on emotional biases rather than evidence. In the context of metaepistemology, epistemic motivation is an inclination to believe in accordance with one's reasons or evidence.) However, most agree there is usually a connection, which requires an explanation. Some theorists explain epistemic motivation in terms of moral or pragmatic concerns, while others see it as intrinsic to belief itself. The issue also intersects with the debate between cognitivism and non-cognitivism. Non-cognitivists view epistemic statements as expressions of desires, which are inherently motivational, whereas cognitivists see them merely as representations. Hence, cognitivists face a challenge of explaining how epistemic facts can motivate beliefs.

With the increasing focus on normativity in epistemology, philosophers have come to question how deep the connections are between metaepistemology and its parallel discipline in ethics, metaethics, which explores similar ideas like moral reasons, judgements and motivation. According to the parity thesis, metaethics and metaepistemology are structurally equivalent to one another so that any positions taken in one should carry over to the other. Normative realists like Terence Cuneo have used this idea as part of "companions in guilt" arguments to extend arguments for epistemic realism to moral realism. Meanwhile, anti-realists like Sharon Street, Allan Gibbard and Matthew Chrisman have taken the reverse approach, extending arguments for moral anti-realism to epistemic anti-realism. In opposition to the parity thesis is the disparity thesis, which claims that there are important disanalogies between metaethics and metaepistemology. For example, philosophers such as Chris Heathwood, Jonas Olson, and James Lenman have argued that moral facts are irreducibly normative while epistemic facts are reducible to descriptive facts.
