= Perspectivism =

Philosophical principle that perspectives and epistemology are always linked

Perspectivism (also called perspectivalism) is the epistemological principle that perception and knowledge are completely dependent on perspective. Perspectivism holds that no one has access to a God's-eye view of the world and that no perspective or interpretation is of equal truth or value. Rather than determining truth by correspondence, perspectivism generally determines truth through comparing and evaluating different perspectives. Perspectivism is sometimes regarded as an early form of epistemological pluralism, though occasionally includes treatment of value theory, moral psychology, and realist metaphysics.

Early forms of perspectivism are found in the philosophies of Protagoras, Michel de Montaigne, and Gottfried Leibniz; however, perspectivism's first major development comes from Friedrich Nietzsche who was influenced by Gustav Teichmüller's prior use of the term. Nietzsche's perspectivism is a realist antimetaphysics rejecting both the correspondence theory of truth and the notion that truth-value always constitutes ultimate worth-value. Nietszsche believed that objective truth can be found through asymptotically studying the differences between perspectives, which contrasts Platonic notions that objective truth is completely independent from perspective.

According to Alexander Nehamas, perspectivism is often misinterpreted as a form of relativism, whereby perspectivists acknowledge the true virtue of fully rejecting the 'Law of excluded middle' regarding a particular proposition. Lacewing Michael adds that although perspectivism doesn't accede to a God's-eye view, objectivity can still be approached—not reached—subjectively and asymptotically. Nehamas also describes how perspectivism does not prohibit holding interpretations to be definitively true but that truth cannot be objectively determined from outside our perspective. The idea that perspectivism is an absolutely true thesis is called weak perspectivism by Brian Lightbody.

The basic principle that things are perceived differently from different perspectives or that perspectives determine one's limited and unprivileged access to knowledge has often been categorized as a rudimentary, uncontroversial form of perspectivism; furthermore, the basic practice of comparing contradictory perspectives to one another may belong in the same category, as may the entire philosophical problem of how true knowledge is to penetrate one's perspectival limitations.

== Precursors and early developments ==
In Western languages, scholars have found perspectivism in the philosophies of Heraclitus (c. 540 – c. 480 BCE), Protagoras (c. 490 – c. 420 BCE), Michel de Montaigne (1533 – 1592 CE), and Gottfried Leibniz (1646 – 1716 CE). The origins of perspectivism have also been found to lie also within Renaissance developments in philosophy of art and its artistic notion of perspective. In Asian languages, scholars have found perspectivism in Buddhist, Jain, and Daoist texts. Anthropologists have found a kind of perspectivism in the thinking of some indigenous peoples. Some theologians believe John Calvin interpreted various scriptures in a perspectivist manner.

=== Ancient Greek philosophy ===
The Western origins of perspectivism can be found in the pre-Socratic philosophies of Heraclitus and Protagoras. In fact, a major cornerstone of Plato's philosophy is his rejection and opposition to perspectivism—this forming a principal element of his aesthetics, ethics, epistemology, and theology. The antiperspectivism of Plato made him a central target of critique for later perspectival philosophers such as Nietzsche.

=== Montaigne ===
Montaigne's philosophy presents in itself a perspectivism less as a doctrinaire position than as a core philosophical approach put into practice. Inasmuch as no one can occupy a God's-eye view, Montaigne holds that no one has access to a view which is totally unbiased, which does not interpret according to its own perspective. It is instead only the underlying psychological biases which view one's own perspective as unbiased. In a passage from his "Of Cannibals", he writes:

Men of intelligence notice more things and view them more carefully, but they [interpret] them; and to establish and substantiate their interpretation, they cannot refrain from altering the facts a little. They never present things just as they are but twist and disguise them to conform to the point of view from which they have seen them; and to gain credence for their opinion and make it attractive, they do not mind adding something of their own, or extending and amplifying.

— Michel de Montaigne, "Of Cannibals", Essais (1595), trans. J. M. Cohen

== Nietzsche ==
In his works, Nietzsche makes a number of statements on perspective which at times contrast each other throughout the development of his philosophy. Nietzsche's perspectivism begins by challenging the underlying notions of 'viewing from nowhere', 'viewing from everywhere', and 'viewing without interpreting' as being absurdities. Instead, all viewing is attached to some perspective, and all viewers are limited in some sense to the perspectives at their command. In The Genealogy of Morals he writes:

Let us be on guard against the dangerous old conceptual fiction that posited a 'pure, will-less, painless, timeless knowing subject'; let us guard against the snares of such contradictory concepts as 'pure reason', 'absolute spirituality', 'knowledge in itself': these always demand that we should think of an eye that is completely unthinkable, an eye turned in no particular direction, in which the active and interpreting forces, through which alone seeing becomes seeing something, are supposed to be lacking; these always demand of the eye an absurdity and a nonsense. There is only a perspective seeing, only a perspective knowing; and the more affects we allow to speak about one thing, the more eyes, different eyes, we can use to observe one thing, the more complete will our 'concept' of this thing, our 'objectivity' be.

— Friedrich Nietzsche, The Genealogy of Morals (1887; III:12), transl. Walter Kaufmann

In this, Nietzsche takes a contextualist approach which rejects any God's-eye view of the world. This has been further linked to his notion of the death of God and the dangers of a resulting relativism. However, Nietzsche's perspectivism itself stands in sharp contrast to any such relativism. In outlining his perspectivism, Nietzsche rejects those who claim everything to be subjective, by disassembling the notion of the subject as itself a mere invention and interpretation.

He further writes that, since the two are mutually dependent on each other, the collapse of the God's-eye view causes also the notion of the thing-in-itself to fall apart with it. Nietzsche views this collapse to reveal, through his genealogical project, that all that has been considered non-perspectival knowledge, the entire tradition of Western metaphysics, has itself been only a perspective.

His perspectivism and genealogical project are further integrated into each other in addressing the psychological drives that underlie various philosophical programs and perspectives, as a form of critique. Here, contemporary scholar Ken Gemes views Nietzsche's perspectivism to above all be a principle of moral psychology, rejecting interpretations of it as an epistemological thesis outrightly. It is through this method of critique that the deficiencies of various perspectives can be alleviated—through a critical mediation of the differences between them rather than any appeals to the non-perspectival. In a posthumously published aphorism from The Will to Power, Nietzsche writes:

"Everything is subjective," you say; but even this is interpretation. The "subject" is not something given, it is something added and invented and projected behind what there is.—Finally, is it necessary to posit an interpreter behind the interpretation? Even this is invention, hypothesis.

In so far as the word "knowledge" has any meaning, the world is knowable; but it is interpretable otherwise, it has no meaning behind it, but countless meanings.—"Perspectivism."

It is our needs that interpret the world; our drives and their For and Against. Every drive is a kind of lust to rule; each one has its perspective that it would like to compel all the other drives to accept as a norm.

— Friedrich Nietzsche, The Will to Power, §481 (1883–1888), transl. Walter Kaufmann and R. J. Hollingdale

While Nietzsche does not plainly reject truth and objectivity, he does reject the notions of absolute truth, external facts, and non-perspectival objectivity.

=== Truth theory and the value of truth ===
Despite receiving much attention within contemporary philosophy, there is no academic consensus on Nietzsche's conception of truth. While his perspectivism presents a number of challenges regarding the nature of truth, its more controversial element lies in its questioning of the value of truth. Contemporary scholars Steven D. Hales and Robert C. Welshon write that:

Nietzsche's writings on truth are among the most elusive and difficult ones in his corpus. One indication of their obscurity is that on an initial reading he appears either blatantly inconsistent in his use of the words 'true' and 'truth', or subject to inexplicable vacillations on the value of truth.

=== Truth and Language ===
One of the earliest examples of Nietzsche’s perspectivist thinking occurs in the 1873 essay, “On Truth and Lies in a Nonmoral Sense.” Infused with a tone of heavy skepticism, the essay explores the arbitrary anthropogenic nature of truth and its connection to an inconstant language. Knowledge of the world, and by extension Truth, is mere illusion, according to Nietzsche, born of variable circumstances, self-deception, and biological nature:

…[Humans] will always exchange truths for illusions. What is a word? It is the copy in sound of a nerve stimulus. But the further inference from the nerve stimulus to a cause outside of us is already the result of a false and unjustifiable application of the principle of sufficient reason. If truth alone had been the deciding factor in the genesis of language, and if the standpoint of certainty had been decisive for designations, then how could we still dare to say ‘the stone is hard,’ as if ‘hard’ were something otherwise familiar to us, and not merely a totally subjective stimulation!

Here Nietzsche is fulminating about the inherent flaw of so-called objectivity. “Subjective stimulation” equates to an individually biased experience, not unlike Montaigne’s abovementioned psychological biases. Of course, it’s worth noting Nietzsche targets his critique on the quality (hardness) and not the object (stone), for when speaking of subjectivity, is it not easier to question how something feels as opposed to what it is? Nonetheless, humans’ reliance on language to express truths automatically compromises the stability of those truths, for language itself is in flux, born of circumstances that differ from time to time, place to place, people to people. Famously, Nietzsche writes:

What then is truth? A moveable host of metaphors, metonymies, and anthropomorphisms: in short, a sum of human relations which have been poetically and rhetorically intensified, transferred, and embellished, and which, after long usage, seem to a people to be fixed, canonical, and binding.

Again, there are echoes of Montaigne in this passage, and one sees how language for Nietzsche is at once slippery and constructed, offering only a perspective of the world, and a spurious one at that.

== Later developments ==
=== 20th century ===
In the 20th century, perspectivism was discussed separately by José Ortega y Gasset and Karl Jaspers. Ortega's perspectivism replaced his previous position that "man is completely social". His reversal is prominent in his work Verdad y perspectiva ("Truth and perspective"), where he explained that "each man has a mission of truth" and that what he sees of reality no other eye sees. He explained:

From different positions two people see the same surroundings. However, they do not see the same thing. Their different positions mean that the surroundings are organized in a different way: what is in the foreground for one may be in the background for another. Furthermore, as things are hidden one behind another, each person will see something that the other may not.

Ortega also maintained that perspective is perfected by the multiplication of its viewpoints. He noted that war transpires due to the lack of perspective and failure to see the larger contexts of the actions among nations. Ortega also cited the importance of phenomenology in perspectivism as he argued against speculation and the importance of concrete evidence in understanding truth and reality. In this discourse, he highlighted the role of "circumstance" in finding out the truth since it allows us to understand realities beyond ourselves.

=== 21st century ===
During the 21st century, perspectivism has led a number of developments within analytic philosophy and philosophy of science, particularly under the early influence of Ronald Giere, Jay Rosenberg, Ernest Sosa, and others. This contemporary form of perspectivism, also known as scientific perspectivism, is more narrowly focused than prior forms—centering on the perspectival limitations of scientific models, theories, observations, and focused interest, while remaining more compatible for example with Kantian philosophy and correspondence theories of truth. Furthermore, scientific perspecitivism has come to address a number of scientific fields such as physics, biology, cognitive neuroscience, and medicine, as well as interdisciplinarity and philosophy of time. Studies of perspectivism have also been introduced into contemporary anthropology, initially through the influence of Eduardo Viveiros de Castro and his research into indigenous cultures of South America.

== Types of perspectivism ==
Contemporary types of perspectivism include:

- Individualist perspectivism
- Collectivist perspectivism
- Transcendental perspectivism
- Theological perspectivism

== See also ==
- Anekantavada, a fundamental doctrine of Jainism setting forth a pluralistic metaphysics, traceable to Mahavira (599–527 BCE)
- Blind men and an elephant
- Conceptual framework
- Consilience, the unity of knowledge
- Constructivist epistemology
- Eclecticism
- Fallibilism
- Fusion of horizons
- Integral theory (disambiguation)
- Intersubjectivity
- Linguistic relativity
- Metaphilosophy
- Model-dependent realism
- Moral nihilism
- Moral skepticism
- Multiperspectivalism, a current in Calvinist epistemology
- Philosophy of Friedrich Nietzsche
- Philosophy of Søren Kierkegaard § Subjectivity
- Point of view (philosophy)
- Rhizome (philosophy)
- Standpoint theory
- Value pluralism
