= Metatheory =

Theory whose subject matter is itself a theory

A metatheory or meta-theory is a theory whose subject matter is another theory. Analyses or descriptions of an existing theory would be considered meta-theories. For mathematics and mathematical logic, a metatheory is a mathematical theory about another mathematical theory. Meta-theoretical investigations are part of the philosophy of science. The topic of metascience is an attempt to use scientific knowledge to improve the practice of science itself.

The study of metatheory became widespread during the 20th century after its application to various topics, including scientific linguistics and its concept of metalanguage.

Schematic explaining the relationship between theory and metatheory

== Examples of metatheories ==
=== Metascience ===
Metascience is the use of scientific method to study science itself. Metascience is an attempt to increase the quality of scientific research while reducing wasted activity; it uses research methods to study how research is done or can be improved. It has been described as "research on research", "the science of science", and "a bird's eye view of science". As stated by John Ioannidis, "Science is the best thing that has happened to human beings ... but we can do it better."

In 1966, an early meta-research paper examined the statistical methods of 295 papers published in ten well-known medical journals. It found that, "in almost 73% of the reports read ... conclusions were drawn when the justification for these conclusions was invalid". Meta-research during the ensuing decades found many methodological flaws, inefficiencies, and bad practices in the research of numerous scientific topics. Many scientific studies could not be reproduced, particularly those involving medicine and the so-called soft sciences. The term "replication crisis" was invented during the early 2010s as part of an increasing awareness of the problem.

Measures have been implemented to address the issues revealed by metascience. These measures include the pre-registration of scientific studies and clinical trials as well as the founding of organizations such as CONSORT and the EQUATOR Network that issue guidelines for methods and reporting. There are continuing efforts to reduce the misuse of statistics, to eliminate perverse incentives from academia, to improve the peer review process, to reduce bias in scientific literature, and to increase the overall quality and efficiency of the scientific process.

A major criticism of metatheory is that it is theory based on other theory.

=== Computational Metatheory ===
Computational metatheory is a conceptual and formal framework based on Theoretical Computer Science to reason about how theories in the sciences can emerge out of theoretical and empirical work. It is a computation-centered approach to problems such as which properties theories should have, what empirical evidence is relevant in a given scientific problem situation, and how discoveries affect the problem space. As such, it complements prevailing approaches to metatheorizing with a focus on the analysis of computational problems.

=== Metamathematics ===
Introduced in 20th-century philosophy as a result of the work of the German mathematician David Hilbert, who in 1905 published a proposal for proof of the consistency and completeness of mathematics, creating the topic of metamathematics. His hopes for the success of this proof were disappointed by the work of Kurt Gödel, who in 1931, used his incompleteness theorems to prove the goal of consistency and completeness to be unattainable. Nevertheless, his program of unsolved mathematical problems influenced mathematics for the rest of the 20th century.

A metatheorem is defined as: "a statement about theorems. It usually gives a criterion for getting a new theorem from an old one, either by changing its objects according to a rule" known as the duality principle, or by transferring it to another topic (e.g., from the theory of categories to the theory of groups) or to another context of the same topic (e.g., from linear transformations to matrices).

=== Metalogic ===
Metalogic is the study of the metatheory of logic. Whereas logic is the study of how logical systems can be used to construct valid and sound arguments, metalogic studies the properties of logical systems. Logic concerns the truths that may be derived using a logical system; metalogic concerns the truths that may be derived about the languages and systems that are used to express truths. The basic objects of metalogical study are formal languages, formal systems, and their interpretations. The study of interpretation of formal systems is the type of mathematical logic that is known as model theory, and the study of deductive systems is the type that is known as proof theory.

=== Metaphilosophy ===
Metaphilosophy is "the investigation of the nature of philosophy". Its subject matter includes the aims of philosophy, the boundaries of philosophy, and its methods. Thus, while philosophy characteristically inquires into the nature of being, the reality of objects, the possibility of knowledge, the nature of truth, and so on, metaphilosophy is the self-referential inquiry into the nature, purposes, and methods of the activity that makes these kinds of inquiries, by asking what is philosophy itself, what sorts of questions it should ask, how it might pose and answer them, and what it can achieve in doing so. It is considered by some to be a topic prior and preparatory to philosophy, while others see it as inherently a part of philosophy, or automatically a part of philosophy while others adopt some combination of these views.

=== Metasociology ===
Metasociology, or sociology of sociology, is a topic of sociology that combines social theories with analysis of the effect of socio-historical contexts in sociological intellectual production.

== See also ==
- Meta-aesthetics
- Meta-anthropology
- Metacognition
- Metacommunication
- Metadata
- Metadiscourse
- Metaeconomics
- Meta-emotion
- Metaepistemology
- Metaethics
- Metageography
- Metahistory
- Metaknowledge
- Metalanguage
- Metalearning
- Metalinguistics
- Metamemory
- Metanarrative
- Meta-ontology
- Metaphysics
- Metapolitics
- Metapragmatics
- Metapsychology
- Metatheology
