= Applied epistemology =

Application of epistemology in specific fields

Applied epistemology refers to the study that determines whether the systems of investigation that seek the truth lead to true beliefs about the world. A specific conceptualization cites that it attempts to reveal whether these systems contribute to epistemic aims. It is applied in practices outside of philosophy like science and mathematics.

Once applied epistemology is described as a method in an epistemological search, it implies that the methodology is supported by an epistemological foundation.

== Background ==
Applied epistemology forms part of the concept of "applied philosophy" as theorists begin to distinguish it from "applied ethics". It is argued that "applied philosophy" is a broader field, and that it has parts that are not subdisciplines of applied ethics. The emergence of "applied philosophy" gained traction after it was proposed that philosophy can be applied to contemporary issues.

Applied epistemology emerged from epistemologists routine examinations that determine whether truth-seeking practices like science and mathematics are capable of delivering truths. It draws from epistemological theorizing to address pressing epistemic matters of practical value. An epistemological question assumes a philosophical form once it deals with the type of knowledge or justification that is presupposed in most ordinary contexts.

In its infancy, applied epistemology had been equated with social epistemology. Later theorizing established that, while there are overlapping aspects, not all social epistemology is applied and not all applied epistemology is social. A proposed analogy to distinguish applied epistemology from epistemology holds that it involves the general opposition between theory and application. In applied epistemology, theories in epistemology are applied for solving practical problems. The theoretical constructions in this environment can be modified or reorganized in function of the primary target.

== Concept ==
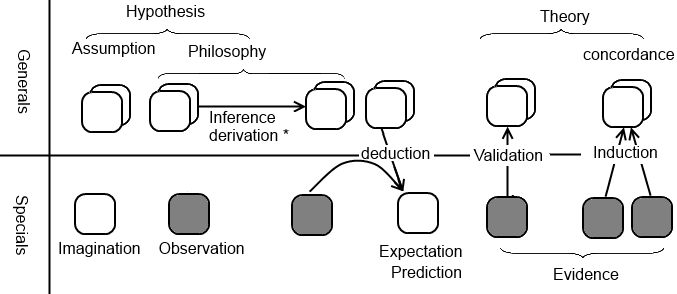
The relationship between basic concepts of epistemology

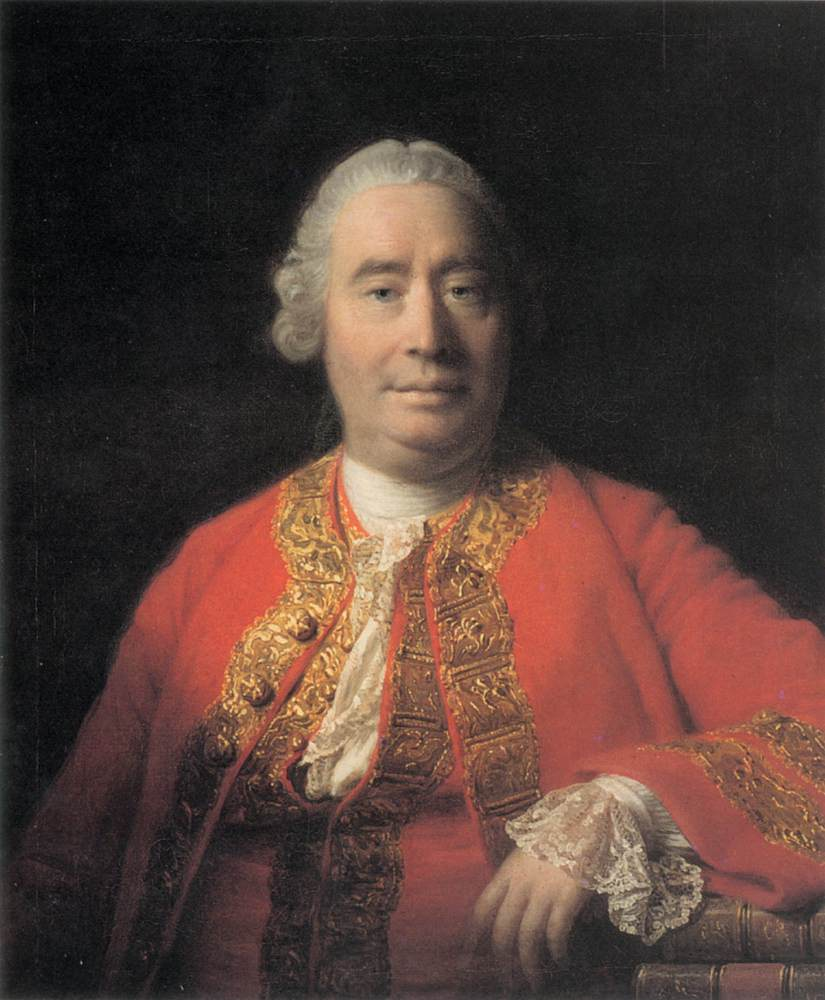
While applied epistemology is considered a new term, it has been used in the past. David Hume used the concept in his argument against belief in miracles.

Applied epistemology is informed by skepticism in philosophy, as it maintains that things should not be taken at face value – that, in reflection, what people knew as "truths" could turn out to be false. Applied epistemology has been concerned with practical questions about truth, knowledge, and other epistemic values but these are not all social questions. It asks questions about what we know and are justified in believing.

Applied epistomology is also considered one of the three branches of epistemology along with normative epistemology and metaepistemology. The normative branch is concerned with first-order theorizing about the formation of justified beliefs, knowledge, and truths. Metaepistemology, on the other hand, deals with higher order epistemological questions, particularly, the fundamental aspects of epistemic theorizing. According to philosopher Richard Fumerton, metaepistemology is concerned with questions about what knowledge – including justification, rationality, and evidence – is. A conceptualization cites that the applied epistemologist operates within a background of naturalist metaepistemology and reliabilist first-order epistemology.

The following table demonstrates the place of applied epistemology in relation to epistemology and to the parallels between ethics and epistemology covering a specific topic according to Mark Battersby. Other philosophers have different conceptions of the relationships.

Level	Ethics topic examples by level	Epistemology topic examples by level
Meta-ethics/epistemology	Meaning of "Good"	Meaning of "Know"
Normative ethics/epistemology	Utilitarianism vs. deontology	Rationalism vs. empiricism
Applied ethics/epistemology	Criteria for morality acceptable euthanasia	Criteria for accepting a causal claim

The main domains of applied epistemology include education and pedagogy, therapy, politics, science and technology, arts, and artificial intelligence.

== Applications ==
As part of "applied philosophy", applied epistemology has been applied to different contemporary practices and issues. This include its application to critical thinking or informal logic, information systems, and pressing social concerns. In the area of critical thinking, there is the underlying idea that thinking clearly and carefully about any issue needs the understanding and application of fundamental epistemological concepts. Theorists draw from philosophical theories to address real-life epistemic issues.

=== Communication ===
According to V.D. Singh, since general semantics is a general theory of evaluation – that it considers the interrelations among events that transpire within ourselves and the world around us as well as how he obtain information or talk about such events and how we behave – makes it an up-to-date and scientifically based applied epistemology. Scholars cite the case of fake news as an issue that can be addressed by applied epistemology. It is posited that corrupted or fake information can be unmasked through an epistemological investigation that answers three questions: 1. What is fake news?; 2. What are the mechanisms that foster the production and spread of fake news; and, 3. which interventions can address it?

=== Scientific research ===
Applied epistemology in science has been described as the specific mental frameworks utilized by scientists in their research and activities that are considered processes of acquiring knowledge. These frameworks also serve as the ground of the sociology of science. There is also the case of the philosophy of science, which provides epistemic justifications for scientific reasoning and choice. It is considered an applied epistemology due to the characterization that it is precise, formal, and normative.

An example of the deployment of applied epistemology in scientific research is the Toolbox Project. It is an initiative that apply philosophical analysis to enhance collaborative, cross-disciplinary scientific research by improving cross-disciplinary communication. There are also scholars who consider the application of epistemologically relevant psychology to science as applied epistemology. Aside from its role in scientific and technological advancement, the concept is also applied in the areas of ethics and policy. It is argued that the instincts that guide actual scientific practice are yet to be fully recognized, scrutinized, and justified.

=== Informal logic ===
According to Mark Battersby, the method of critical thinking or informal logic can be considered a form of applied epistemology. This method involves the assessment of the strength of evidences that afford conclusions can only be made if the domain within which the argument is presented is taken into account. For Battersby, this constitutes applied epistemology, since it is about grounding assessments of arguments as they occur within them. Mark Weinstein maintained that a focus on the account of how acceptability is transmitted from premises to conclusion show close theoretical parallel between informal logic and applied epistemology. It is argued that rather than rules of logic, epistemological norms constitute the philosophical core of informal logic and that there is a close parallel between informal logic and applied ethics. Based on these factors, scholars such as Battersby and Weinstein maintain that informal logic should be classified as applied epistemology instead of logic.

=== Social issues ===
It has been suggested by scholars such as Jennifer Lackey that applied epistemology provides the tools in contemporary epistemology's evaluation of the issues of social concern. It is relevant to issues affecting social groups since it helps in answering the recurring practical question, "what to believe now". Applied epistemology is also considered capable of unmasking the contribution of the features of public deliberation to a group's reliability and provide a basis for a reliabilist rationale for democracy in the process. Applied epistemology has also been employed in examining feminism, particularly with respect to the evaluation of the agency of women and what is the relevance of giving it authorial primacy within studies of knowledge.

=== Information studies ===
According to Tim Gorichanaz, applied epistemology allows information studies to benefit from the field of philosophy particularly since it rarely focuses on the evaluation of epistemic concepts. It is also suggested that applying the concept to information system can bridge the information processing models of cognition and constructivist perspectives on knowledge. Applied epistemology can be prominent in the "schema" or the cognitive organization of meaningful information. Specifically, it is the information structure that can be modified to represent knowledge of interrelationships between events, objects, and situations that we encounter.

=== Psychology ===
Applied epistemology is relevant to the field of psychology and cognitive science as it focuses on the study of particular epistemic problems and processes and is characterized as part of an empirical field. It addresses how cognitive agents go about constructing epistemically adequate representations of the world. The content of the psychological experts or therapists' cognitive organization or "knowing" processes has also been described as applied epistemology. This system of knowing allows a better understanding of a patient's problems. It also represents part of the knowledge system in which interventions that facilitate change can be drawn.

=== Law ===
Legal epistemology is considered a form of applied epistemology for its evaluation of whether legal systems of investigation that seeks the truth are structured in a manner that actually lead to justified and true beliefs. Applied epistemics allows the legal system to draw from philosophy. For instance, David Hume stated that, "we entertain a suspicion concerning any matter of fact, when the witnesses contradict each other; when they are but few, or a doubtful character; when they have an interest in what they affirm; when they deliver their testimony with hesitation, or on the contrary, with too violent asseverations." This generic view is said to allow legal procedure the effective evaluation of testimonies.

=== Philosophy ===
Applied epistemology is also used in evaluating philosophical issues. This is the case when empirical perspective is applied to test philosophical theories. While this approach does not eliminate analytic and conceptual issues, it can make them clearer. It also increases the probability of theorists to examine evidences that tend to be overlooked.

=== Cybernetics ===
Applied epistemology is also significant in cybernetics, which involves the control and communication of living and man-made systems. Modern cybernetics, particularly, is considered an applied epistemology for its focus on how the process of the construction of models of the systems is influenced by the living and man-made systems in its goal of understanding the similarities and differences of the inner workings of the organic and machine processes. Once applied to cybernetics, applied epistemology also contributes in shaping responses to global and local issues since it helps construct a type of political epistemology that can lead to a holistic and socially responsible discourse and practice.
