= Metaknowledge =

Knowledge about knowledge

Metaknowledge or meta-knowledge is knowledge about knowledge.

Some authors divide meta-knowledge into orders:

- zero order meta-knowledge is knowledge whose domain is not knowledge (and hence zero order meta-knowledge is not meta-knowledge per se)
- first order meta-knowledge is knowledge whose domain is zero order meta-knowledge
- second order meta-knowledge is knowledge whose domain is first order meta-knowledge
- most generally, $n + 1$ order meta-knowledge is knowledge whose domain is $n$ order meta-knowledge.

Other authors call zero order meta-knowledge first order knowledge, and call first order meta-knowledge second order knowledge; meta-knowledge is also known as higher order knowledge.

Meta-knowledge is a fundamental conceptual instrument in such research and scientific domains as, knowledge engineering, knowledge management, and others dealing with study and operations on knowledge, seen as a unified object/entities, abstracted from local conceptualizations and terminologies. Examples of the first-level individual meta-knowledge are methods of planning, modeling, tagging, learning and every modification of a domain knowledge. Indeed, universal meta-knowledge frameworks have to be valid for the organization of meta-levels of individual meta-knowledge.

Meta-knowledge may be automatically harvested from electronic publication archives, to reveal patterns in research, relationships between researchers and institutions and to identify contradictory results.

== See also ==
- Epistemic logic
- Macropædia
- Metacognition
- Metalearning
- Metaprogramming (in computer science)
- Metahistory (concept)
- Metahistory, a book by Hayden White
- Meta-philosophy
- Meta-epistemology
- Metalogic
- Metamathematics
- Metaphysics
- Meta-ethics
- Meta-ontology
- Metatheory
- Metadata
