= Epistemic theories of truth =

Attempts to analyze the concept of truth

In philosophy and epistemology, epistemic theories of truth are attempts to analyze the notion of truth in terms of epistemic notions such as knowledge, belief, acceptance, verification, justification, and perspective.

A variety of such conceptions can be classified into verificationist theories, perspectivist or relativist theories, and pragmatic theories.

Verificationism is based on verifying propositions. The distinctive claim of verificationism is that the result of such verifications is, by definition, truth. That is, truth is reducible to this process of verification.

According to perspectivism and relativism, a proposition is only true relative to a particular perspective. Roughly, a proposition is true relative to a perspective if and only if it is accepted, endorsed, or legitimated by that perspective.

Many authors writing on the topic of the notion of truth advocate or endorse combinations of the above positions. Each of these epistemic conceptions of truth can be subjected to various criticisms. Some criticisms apply across the board, while others are more specific.

== Verificationist views ==
The two main kinds of verification philosophies are positivism and a-priorism.

In positivism, a proposition is meaningful, and thus capable of being true or false, if and only if it is verifiable by sensory experiences.

A-priorism, often used in the domains of logic and mathematics, holds a proposition true if and only if a priori reasoning can verify it. In the related certainty theory, associated with Descartes and Spinoza, a proposition is true if and only if it is known with certainty.

Logical positivism attempts to combine positivism with a version of a-priorism.

Another theory of truth that is related to a-priorism is the concept-containment theory of truth. The concept-containment theory of truth is the view that a proposition is true if and only if the concept of the predicate of the proposition is "contained in" the concept of the subject. For example, the proposition that bachelors are unmarried men is true, in this view, because the concept of the predicate (unmarried men) is contained in the concept of the subject (bachelor). A contemporary reading of the concept-containment theory of truth is to say that every true proposition is an analytically true proposition.

== Perspectivist views ==
According to perspectivism and relativism, a proposition is only true relative to a particular perspective. The Sophists' relativist and Nietzsche's philosophy are some of the most famous examples of such perspectivism. There are three main versions of perspectivism, and some interesting subdivisions:

=== Individualist perspectivism ===
According to individualist perspectivism (also individual perspectivism) perspectives are the points of view of particular individual persons. So, a proposition is true for a person if and only if it is accepted or believed by that person (i.e., "true for me").

=== Collectivist perspectivism ===
In collectivist perspectivism, perspectives are understood as collective (cultures-dependent).

There are, roughly, three versions of collectivism:

==== Consensus ====
A perspective is, roughly, the broad opinions, and perhaps norms and practices, of a community of people, perhaps all having some special feature in common. So, a proposition is true (for a community C) if, and only if, there is a consensus amongst the members of C for believing it.

==== Power ====
In the power-oriented view, a perspective is a community enforced by power, authority, military might, privilege, etc. So, a proposition is true if it "makes us powerful" or is "produced by power", thus the slogan "truth is power".

This view of truth as a political stake may be loosely associated with Martin Heidegger or with Michel Foucault's specific analysis of historical and political discourse, as well as with some social constructivists.

However, the Nazi mysticism of a communitarian "blood community" conception radically differs from Heidegger or Foucault's criticism of the notion of the individual or collective subject.

==== Marxist ====
Truth-generating perspectives are collective and opposed to, or engaged in a struggle against, power and authority. For example, the collective perspective of the "proletariat". So, the proposition is true if it is the "product of political struggle" for the "emancipation of the workers" (Theodor Adorno). This view is again associated with some social constructivists (e.g., feminist epistemologists).

=== Transcendental perspectivism ===
According to transcendental perspectivism, a truth-conferring perspective is something transcendental, and outside immediate human reach. The idea is that there is a transcendental or ideal epistemic perspective and the truth is, roughly, what is accepted or recognized-as-true from that ideal perspective. There are two subvarieties of transcendental perspectivism:

==== Coherentism ====
The ideal epistemic perspective is the set of "maximally coherent and consistent propositions". A proposition is true if and only if it is a member of this maximally coherent and consistent set of propositions (associated with several German and British 19th century idealists).

==== Theological perspectivism ====
Theological perspectivism is the idea that a proposition is true if and only if it agrees with the thoughts of God.

== Pragmatic views ==
Although the pragmatic theory of truth is not strictly classifiable as an epistemic theory of truth, it does bear a relationship to theories of truth that are based on concepts of inquiry and knowledge.

The ideal epistemic perspective is that of "completed science", which will appear in the (temporal) "limit of scientific inquiry". A proposition is true if and only if, in the long run it will come to be accepted by a group of inquirers using scientific rational inquiry. This can also be modalized: a proposition is true if, and only if, in the long run it would come to be accepted by a group of inquirers, if they were to use scientific rational inquiry. This view is thus a modification of the consensus view. The consensus needs to satisfy certain constraints in order for the accepted propositions to be true. For example, the methods used must be those of scientific inquiry (criticism, observation, reproducibility, etc.). This "modification" of the consensus view is an appeal to the correspondence theory of truth, which is opposed to the consensus theory of truth.

Long-run scientific pragmatism was defended by Charles Sanders Peirce. A variant of this viewpoint is associated with Jürgen Habermas, though he later abandoned it.

== See also ==
- Confirmation holism
- Criteria of truth

=== Related topics ===
- Epistemic motivation
- Pragmaticism
- Pragmatic maxim
- Scientific method
- Testability
