= Transcendence (philosophy) =

Concept designating the extra-categorical attributes of beings

In philosophy, transcendence is the basic ground concept from the word's literal meaning (from Latin), of climbing or going beyond, albeit with varying connotations in its different historical and cultural stages. It includes philosophies, systems, and approaches that describe the fundamental structures of being, not as an ontology (theory of being), but as the framework of emergence and validation of knowledge of being. These definitions are generally grounded in reason and empirical observation and seek to provide a framework for understanding the world that is not reliant on religious beliefs or supernatural forces. "Transcendental" is a word derived from the scholastic, designating the extra-categorical attributes of beings.

== Religious definition ==
In religion, transcendence refers to the aspect of God's nature and power which is wholly independent of the material universe, beyond all physical laws. This is contrasted with immanence, where a god is said to be fully present in the physical world and thus accessible to creatures in various ways. In religious experience, transcendence is a state of being that has overcome the limitations of physical existence and by some definitions has also become independent of it. This is typically manifested in prayer, séance, meditation, psychedelics and visions.

It is affirmed in various religious traditions' concept of the divine, which contrasts with the notion of a god (or, the Absolute) that exists exclusively in the physical order (immanentism), or indistinguishable from it (pantheism). Transcendence can be attributed to the divine not only in its being, but also in its knowledge. Thus, God may transcend both the universe and knowledge (is beyond the grasp of the human mind). Although transcendence is defined as the opposite of immanence, the two are not necessarily mutually exclusive. Some theologians and metaphysicians of various religious traditions affirm that a god is both within and beyond the universe (panentheism); in it, but not of it; simultaneously pervading it and surpassing it.

== Modern philosophy ==
The Ethics of Baruch Spinoza used the expression "transcendental terms" (in Latin: termini transcendentales) to indicate concepts like Being, Thing, Something, which are too general to be included in the definitions of species, genus and category. In modern philosophy, Immanuel Kant introduced a new term, transcendental, thus instituting a new, third meaning. In his theory of knowledge, this concept is concerned with the condition of possibility of knowledge itself. He also opposed the term transcendental to the term transcendent, the latter meaning "that which goes beyond" (transcends) any possible knowledge of a human being. For him transcendental meant knowledge about our cognitive faculty with regard to how objects are possible a priori. "I call all knowledge transcendental if it is occupied, not with objects, but with the way that we can possibly know objects even before we experience them." Therefore, metaphysics, as a fundamental and universal theory, turns out to be an epistemology. Transcendental philosophy, consequently, is not considered a traditional ontological form of metaphysics.

Kant equated transcendental with that which is "... in respect of the subject's faculty of cognition." Something is transcendental if it plays a role in the way in which the mind "constitutes" objects and makes it possible for us to experience them as objects in the first place. Ordinary knowledge is knowledge of objects; transcendental knowledge is knowledge of how it is possible for us to experience those objects as objects. This is based on Kant's acceptance of David Hume's argument that certain general features of objects (e.g. persistence, causal relationships) cannot be derived from the sense impressions we have of them. Kant argues that the mind must contribute those features and make it possible for us to experience objects as objects. In the central part of his Critique of Pure Reason, the "Transcendental Deduction of the Categories", Kant argues for a deep interconnection between the ability to have consciousness of self and the ability to experience a world of objects. Through a process of synthesis, the mind generates both the structure of objects and its own unity.

A metaphilosophical question discussed by many Kantian scholars is what transcendental reflection is and how transcendental reflection is itself possible. Valentin Balanovskiy shows that this is a special instrument inherent in our consciousness, something by what individuals can distinguish themselves from any other objects of reality. Stephen Palmquist argues that Kant's solution to this problem is an appeal to faith. For Kant, the "transcendent", as opposed to the "transcendental", is that which lies beyond what our faculty of knowledge can legitimately know. Hegel's counter-argument to Kant was that to know a boundary is also to be aware of what it bounds and as such what lies beyond it – in other words, to have already transcended it.

== Contemporary philosophy ==
In phenomenology, the "transcendent" is that which transcends our own consciousness: that which is objective rather than only a phenomenon of consciousness. Jean-Paul Sartre also speaks of transcendence in his works. In Being and Nothingness, Sartre uses transcendence to describe the relation of the self to the object-oriented world, as well as our concrete relations with others. For Sartre, the for-itself is sometimes called a transcendence. Additionally, if the other is viewed strictly as an object, much like any other object, then the other is, for the for-itself, a transcendence-transcended. When the for-itself grasps the other in the other’s world, and grasps the subjectivity that the other has, it is referred to as transcending-transcendence. Thus, Sartre defines relations with others in terms of transcendence.

Contemporary transcendental philosophy is developed by German philosopher Harald Holz with a holistic approach. Holz distanced transcendental philosophy from the convergence of neo-Kantianism. He critically discussed transcendental pragmatism and the relation between transcendental philosophy, neo-empiricism, and so-called postmodernism.

== Comparison to religious definitions ==
Philosophical definitions of transcendence often emphasize the idea of going beyond or exceeding the limits of human experience, and may focus on concepts such as rationality, consciousness, or the nature of reality. These definitions are generally grounded in reason and empirical observation, and seek to provide a framework for understanding the world that is not reliant on religious beliefs or supernatural forces. Religious definitions of transcendence, on the other hand, often emphasize the idea of connecting with something beyond the self or the material world, and may focus on concepts such as God, the soul, or the afterlife. These definitions are often grounded in faith and revelation, and may be seen as offering a way to access a higher or divine reality that cannot be directly observed or explained through reason alone.

While there may be some overlap between these two definitions of transcendence, they are ultimately grounded in different epistemological frameworks and ways of understanding the world. Therefore, the scope derived from the philosophical definition of transcendence could contain the scope derived from the religious definition of transcendence, but not vice versa. This is because the philosophical definition of transcendence is broader and more abstract than the religious definition, which is more specific and focused on a particular faith or belief system.

== Colloquial usage ==
In everyday language, "transcendence" means "going beyond", and "self-transcendence" means going beyond a prior form or state of oneself. Mystical experience is thought of as a particularly advanced state of self-transcendence, in which the sense of a separate self is abandoned. "Self-transcendence" is believed to be psychometrically measurable, and (at least partially) inherited, and has been incorporated as a personality dimension in the Temperament and Character Inventory. The discovery of this is described in the book The God Gene by Dean Hamer, although this has been criticized by commentators such as Carl Zimmer.

== Comparison to immanence ==
The doctrine or theory of immanence holds that the divine encompasses or is manifested in the material world. It is held by some philosophical and metaphysical theories of divine presence. Immanence is usually applied in monotheistic, pantheistic, pandeistic, or panentheistic faiths to suggest that the spiritual world permeates the mundane. It is often contrasted with theories of transcendence, in which the divine is seen to be outside the material world.

== See also ==
- God gene
- Ignoramus et ignorabimus
- Immanence
- Maslow's hierarchy of needs
- Materialism
- Meta
- Transcendental empiricism
- Transcendental hermeneutic phenomenology
- Transcendental humanism
- Transcendental materialism
- Transcendental Meditation
- Transcendental naturalism
- Transcendental nihilism
- Transcendental nominalism
- Transcendental perspectivism
- Transcendental realism
- Transcendental Thomism
- Transcendentalism
- Transcendentals
- Tzimtzum, the traditional kabbalistic understanding

== Bibliography ==
- Kluger, Jeffrey (17 October 2004). "Is God in Our Genes?". Time. Archived from the original on 10 November 2006.
- Razavi, Mehdi Amin (1997). Suhrawardi and the School of Illumination. Routledge. ISBN 0-7007-0412-4.
