= Metaphilosophy =

Investigation of the nature of philosophy

Metaphilosophy, sometimes called the philosophy of philosophy, is "the investigation of the nature of philosophy". Its subject matter includes the aims of philosophy, the boundaries of philosophy, and its methods. Thus, while philosophy characteristically inquires into the nature of being, the reality of objects, the possibility of knowledge, the nature of truth, and so on, metaphilosophy is the self-reflective inquiry into the nature, aims, and methods of the activity that makes these kinds of inquiries, by asking what is philosophy itself, what sorts of questions it should ask, how it might pose and answer them, and what it can achieve in doing so. It is considered by some to be a subject prior and preparatory to philosophy, while others see it as inherently a part of philosophy, or automatically a part of philosophy while others adopt some combination of these views.

The interest in metaphilosophy led to the establishment of the journal Metaphilosophy in January 1970.

Many sub-disciplines of philosophy have their own branch of 'metaphilosophy', examples being meta-aesthetics, meta-epistemology, meta-ethics, and metametaphysics (meta-ontology).

Although the term metaphilosophy and explicit attention to metaphilosophy as a specific domain within philosophy arose in the 20th century, the topic is likely as old as philosophy itself, and can be traced back at least as far as the works of Ancient Greeks and Ancient Indian Nyaya.

== Relationship to philosophy ==
Some philosophers consider metaphilosophy to be a subject apart from philosophy, above or beyond it, while others object to that idea. Timothy Williamson argues that the philosophy of philosophy is "automatically part of philosophy", as is the philosophy of anything else. Ludwig Wittgenstein argued that there is no "second-order philosophy" in the same way an explanation of the spelling of spelling is not second-order spelling, or orthography of the word orthography is not second-order orthography. Nicholas Bunnin and Jiyuan Yu write that the separation of first- from second-order study has lost popularity as philosophers find it hard to observe the distinction. As evidenced by these contrasting opinions, debate persists as to whether the evaluation of the nature of philosophy is 'second-order philosophy' or simply 'plain philosophy'.

Many philosophers have expressed doubts over the value of metaphilosophy. Among them is Gilbert Ryle: "preoccupation with questions about methods tends to distract us from prosecuting the methods themselves. We run as a rule, worse, not better, if we think a lot about our feet. So let us ... not speak of it all but just do it."

== Terminology ==
The designations metaphilosophy and philosophy of philosophy have a variety of meanings, sometimes taken to be synonyms, and sometimes seen as distinct.

Morris Lazerowitz claims to have coined the term metaphilosophy around 1940 and used it in print in 1942. Lazerowitz proposed that metaphilosophy is 'the investigation of the nature of philosophy'. Earlier uses have been found in translations from French. The term is derived from Greek word meta μετά ("after", "beyond", "with") and philosophía φιλοσοφία ("love of wisdom").

The term metaphilosophy is used by Paul Moser in the sense of a 'second-order' or more fundamental undertaking than philosophy itself, in the manner suggested by Charles Griswold:

"The distinction between philosophy and metaphilosophy has an analogue in the familiar distinction between mathematics and metamathematics."

— Paul K. Moser, Metaphilosophy, p. 562

Some other philosophers treat the prefix meta as simply meaning 'about...', rather than as referring to a metatheoretical 'second-order' form of philosophy, among them Rescher and Double. Others, such as Williamson, prefer the term philosophy of philosophy instead of metaphilosophy as it avoids the connotation of a 'second-order' discipline that looks down on philosophy, and instead denotes something that is a part of it. Joll suggests that to take metaphilosophy as 'the application of the methods of philosophy to philosophy itself' is too vague, while the view that sees metaphilosophy as a 'second-order' or more abstract discipline, outside philosophy, "is narrow and tendentious".

In the analytic tradition, the term metaphilosophy is mostly used to tag commenting and research on previous works as opposed to original contributions towards solving philosophical problems.

== Writings ==
Ludwig Wittgenstein wrote about the nature of philosophical puzzles and philosophical understanding. He suggested philosophical errors arose from confusions about the nature of philosophical inquiry.

C. D. Broad distinguished Critical from Speculative philosophy in his "The Subject-matter of Philosophy, and its Relations to the special Sciences", in Introduction to Scientific Thought, 1923. Curt Ducasse, in Philosophy as a Science, examines several views of the nature of philosophy, and concludes that philosophy has a distinct subject matter: appraisals. Ducasse's view has been among the first to be described as 'metaphilosophy'.

Henri Lefebvre in Métaphilosophie (1965) argued, from a Marxian standpoint, in favor of an "ontological break", as a necessary methodological approach for critical social theory (while criticizing Louis Althusser's "epistemological break" with subjective Marxism, which represented a fundamental theoretical tool for the school of Marxist structuralism).

Paul Moser writes that typical metaphilosophical discussion includes determining the conditions under which a claim can be said to be a philosophical one. He regards meta-ethics, the study of ethics, to be a form of metaphilosophy, as well as meta-epistemology, the study of epistemology.

== Topics ==
Many sub-disciplines of philosophy have their own branch of 'metaphilosophy'. However, some topics within 'metaphilosophy' cut across the various subdivisions of philosophy to consider fundamentals important to all its sub-disciplines.

=== Aims ===
Some philosophers (e.g. existentialists, pragmatists) think philosophy is ultimately a practical discipline that should help us lead meaningful lives by showing us who we are, how we relate to the world around us and what we should do. Others (e.g. analytic philosophers) see philosophy as a technical, formal, and entirely theoretical discipline, with goals such as "the disinterested pursuit of knowledge for its own sake". Other proposed goals of philosophy include discovering the absolutely fundamental reason of everything it investigates, making explicit the nature and significance of ordinary and scientific beliefs, and unifying and transcending the insights given by science and religion. Others proposed that philosophy is a complex discipline because it has 4 or 6 different dimensions.

=== Boundaries ===
Defining philosophy and its boundaries is itself problematic; Nigel Warburton has called it "notoriously difficult". There is no straightforward definition, and most interesting definitions are controversial. As Bertrand Russell wrote:

"We may note one peculiar feature of philosophy. If someone asks the question what is mathematics, we can give him a dictionary definition, let us say the science of number, for the sake of argument. As far as it goes this is an uncontroversial statement... Definitions may be given in this way of any field where a body of definite knowledge exists. But philosophy cannot be so defined. Any definition is controversial and already embodies a philosophic attitude. The only way to find out what philosophy is, is to do philosophy."

— Bertrand Russell, The Wisdom of the West, p. 7

While there is some agreement that philosophy involves general or fundamental topics, there is no clear agreement about a series of demarcation issues, including:

- that between first-order and second-order investigations. Some authors say that philosophical inquiry is second-order, having concepts, theories, and presuppositions as its subject matter; that it is "thinking about thinking", of a "generally second-order character"; that philosophers study, rather than use, the concepts that structure our thinking. However, the Oxford Dictionary of Philosophy warns that "the borderline between such 'second-order' reflection, and ways of practicing the first-order discipline itself, is not always clear: philosophical problems may be tamed by the advance of a discipline, and the conduct of a discipline may be swayed by philosophical reflection".
- that between philosophy and empirical science. Some argue that philosophy is distinct from science in that its questions cannot be answered empirically, that is, by observation or experiment. Some analytical philosophers argue that all meaningful empirical questions are to be answered by science, not philosophy. However, some schools of contemporary philosophy such as the pragmatists and naturalistic epistemologists argue that philosophy should be linked to science and should be scientific in the broad sense of that term, "preferring to see philosophical reflection as continuous with the best practice of any field of intellectual enquiry".
- that between philosophy and religion. Some argue that philosophy is distinct from religion in that it allows no place for faith or revelation: that philosophy does not try to answer questions by appeal to revelation, myth or religious knowledge of any kind, but uses reason, without reference to sensible observation and experiments". However, philosophers and theologians such as Thomas Aquinas and Peter Damian have argued that philosophy is the "handmaiden of theology" (ancilla theologiae).

=== Methods ===
Philosophical method (or philosophical methodology) is the study of how to do philosophy. A common view among philosophers is that philosophy is distinguished by the ways that philosophers follow in addressing philosophical questions. There is not just one method that philosophers use to answer philosophical questions.

C.D. Broad classifies philosophy into two methods, he distinguished between critical philosophy and speculative philosophy. He described critical philosophy as analysing "unanalysed concepts in daily life and in science" and then "expos[ing] them to every objection that we can think of". While speculative philosophy's role is to "take over all aspects of human experience, to reflect upon them, and to try to think out a view of Reality as a whole which shall do justice to all of them".

Recently, some philosophers have cast doubt about intuition as a basic tool in philosophical inquiry, from Socrates up to contemporary philosophy of language. In Rethinking Intuition various thinkers discard intuition as a valid source of knowledge and thereby call into question 'a priori' philosophy. Experimental philosophy is a form of philosophical inquiry that makes at least partial use of empirical research—especially opinion polling—in order to address persistent philosophical questions. This is in contrast with the methods found in analytic philosophy, whereby some say a philosopher will sometimes begin by appealing to his or her intuitions on an issue and then form an argument with those intuitions as premises. However, disagreement about what experimental philosophy can accomplish is widespread and several philosophers have offered criticisms. One claim is that the empirical data gathered by experimental philosophers can have an indirect effect on philosophical questions by allowing for a better understanding of the underlying psychological processes which lead to philosophical intuitions. Some analytic philosophers like Timothy Williamson have rejected such a move against 'armchair' philosophy–i.e., philosophical inquiry that is undergirded by intuition–by construing 'intuition' (which they believe to be a misnomer) as merely referring to common cognitive faculties: If one is calling into question 'intuition', one is, they would say, harboring a skeptical attitude towards common cognitive faculties–a consequence that seems philosophically unappealing. For Williamson, instances of intuition are instances of our cognitive faculties processing counterfactuals (or subjunctive conditionals) that are specific to the thought experiment or example in question.

=== Progress ===
A prominent question in metaphilosophy is whether philosophical progress occurs and, moreover, whether such progress in philosophy is even possible.

David Chalmers divides inquiry into philosophical progress in metaphilosophy into three questions:

1. The existence question: Is there progress in philosophy?
2. The comparison question: Is there as much progress in philosophy as in science?
3. The explanation question: Why isn't there more progress in philosophy?

Ludwig Wittgenstein, in Culture and Value remarked, "Philosophy hasn't made any progress? - If somebody scratches the spot where he has an itch, do we have to see some progress?...And can't this reaction to an irritation continue in the same way for a long time before the cure for an itching is discovered?".

According to Hilary Putnam, philosophy is more adept at showing people that specific ideas or arguments are wrong than that specific ideas or arguments are right.

The work of David Lewis has been the subject of a quantitative analysis conducted by philosopher Benj Hellie in order to study his rate of philosophical progress. According to Hellie, Lewis's most significant breakthroughs only started to occur during the midpoint of Lewis's philosophical career, after transitioning from framing a descriptive science of mind and meaning to focusing on metaphysics. Hellie then argues that future philosophers can learn much about Lewis's right and wrong steps in order to maximize philosophical breakthroughs.

== See also ==
- Antiphilosophy
- Metacognition
- Metatheory
- Meta-knowledge
- Metaphysics
- Metapolitics
- Metasemantics
- Non-philosophy
- Philosophical theory of everything
- List of philosophical problems
