= Transcendental humanism =

Transcendental humanism in philosophy considers humans as simultaneously the originators of meaning and subjects to a larger ultimate truth that exists beyond the human realm (transcendence). The philosophy suggests that the humanistic approach is guided by "accuracy, truth, discovery, and objectivity" that transcends or exists apart from subjectivity.

The term is associated predominantly with the work of philosopher Immanuel Kant and his theory Kant's Copernican. However, the theory is both heavily influenced by and reflected in the work of other well-known theorists, including Rousseau, Emerson, and Husserl.

Transcendental humanism can be largely traced back to Continental rationalism and British Empiricism in the 17th and 18th centuries. This formed the basis of philosophical thought that inspired transcendental humanist thinking through the amalgamation of logical rationalism and psychological empiricism.

Kant's theory of transcendental humanism has been subject to criticism by academics for its paradoxical position that has caused misinterpretation of the theory. In the world of academia, critiques have engaged in profound discussion and debate around the meaning, relevance and historical context of the philosophical theory. The ample discussion surrounding the topic branches from the broad nature of the theory that responds to the nature and origin of knowledge and the human cognition.

== Background and key ideas ==
Transcendental humanism is a cross-section of both humanist and transcendental philosophies. Humanism is a philosophy founded in a rationalist outlook that emphasises human agency as opposed to that of the divine. It recognises the centrality of moral values in human nature and experience. Thus, humans are believed to have the freedom to give meaning though independent thought and inquiry.

The word transcendental describes that which lies beyond the limitations of physical experience and knowledge. In philosophy, transcendence refers to an understanding of the mind's innate ability to process sensory evidence, employed as a theoretical perspective to define the structures of being as a framework to analyse the emergence and validation of knowledge.

According to Kantian philosophy, transcendental philosophy is defined a priori. Dating back to Ancient philosophy and the Hellenistic period, coined by Plato and Aristotle, a priori is a Latin phrase used in philosophy to describe knowledge that exists in the mind prior to and independent of experience. It exists as a faculty or character trait, independent of observation or experimentation.

As such, transcendental humanism implies that humans are both of the creators of and receptors of meaning. Historically, the philosophy is thought to reconcile the transcendental positioning of Continental Rationalism and the humanistic approach of British Empiricism. Continental Rationalism was established by René Descartes and covered the 17th and 18th century. It is based on the thesis that humans can be the source of all knowledge. British Empiricism was also founded in the 17th and 18th century and proposed that all knowledge is gained though experience and thus all knowledge, with the exception of mathematics, empirical.

== Influential theorists and philosophers ==
=== Jean-Jacques Rousseau (1712–1778) ===
Jean-Jacques Rousseau (1712–1778) was a Swiss writer and philosopher. He is commonly recognised for his book The Social Contract (1762), which was originally published as On the Social Contract, or Principles of Political Right. The book, which theorises about community governed by an agreement that dictates both "moral and political rules of behaviour", begins with a famous phrase that; "Man was/is born free, and everywhere he is in chains". Thus, Rousseau's contribution to the philosophical theory of transcendental humanism can be found in his definition of human freedom as the autonomy to live according to the law one has prescribed to himself, and according to his own judgement about what is good.

=== Immanuel Kant (1724–1804) ===
Immanuel Kant (1724–1804) is a German philosopher that centred many of his studies and critical philosophy around human autonomy in the causes and origins of knowledge. Kant's "transcendental, logical investigation of the nature and limits of knowledge", which inherently lead to the analysis of human characteristics and cognitive faculties as "a priori", form the key foundations of transcendental humanism. Kant's Copernican describes the human mind as the originator of experience rather than a recipient of perception. This lends to the core idea of transcendental humanism, which describes man as "a part of nature, subject to its laws", and on the other hand able to not only transcend these laws, "but who is actually the author of these laws".

=== Ralph Waldo Emerson (1803–1882) ===
Ralph Waldo Emerson (1803–1882) was an American essayist, poet and philosopher best known for his contribution to the transcendentalism movement of the mid-19th century. Emerson's spiritual transcendentalism re-emerged in New England following Kant's rational transcendentalism. He was a pivotal member of the Transcendental Club (1836) and thus had a significant impact on the rise of transcendental humanism. His philosophies are considered by many a blending of Kantian and Goethean themes that give "more to interpretation than to argumentation".

== Related concepts, theories and ideologies ==
=== Transcendentalism ===
Transcendentalism is a philosophy defined by the a priori conditions of knowledge or experience. In philosophy, knowledge is considered transcendental if it is made up not of objects, but the way in which we know objects before prior to experiencing them.

Transcendental concepts (pure concepts of reason) include that of the soul (psychology), ultimate reality (cosmology), and God (theology). These ideas are transcendental as they cannot be proven empirically, and no empirical or observed concept of these ideas can adequately or holistically represent them. However, while their representations are not based on empirical cognition, the three transcendental ideas may still guide an understanding of the empirical world.

==== Spiritual Transcendentalism ====
Closely aligned with the study of theology, spiritual transcendentalism describes a religious worldview that acknowledges the existence of a Higher Power beyond human capabilities or experience. It can be referred to as the acknowledgement of an underlying unity within nature.

==== Transcendental Idealism ====
Idealism in philosophy is defined by the subjectivity of space and time and concerns the limits of human cognition in its claims to the knowledge of objects. Philosopher Immanuel Kant proposed that space and time, rather than being empirically mediated appearances in themselves, are the "very forms of intuition" in the way people perceive and interpret objects.

Kant distinguishes between that of the phenomenal and noumenal world, in which phenomena are 'appearances', or those that are apparent to the senses, and noumena are 'things in themselves' that exist within the intelligible realm. In the phenomenal world, objects are present to individuals through their sensibility. As such, one has knowledge of objects through the world of appearances and sense perception, yet, the ascription of meaning comes from the noumenal world, or the transcendental realm.

Immanuel Kant's transcendental idealism is defined in the "Fourth Paralogism" of The Critique of Pure Reason (1781):

"Now all outer appearances are of this kind: their existence cannot be immediately perceived, but can be inferred only as the cause of given perceptions: Thus the existence of all objects of outer sense is doubtful. This uncertainty I call the ideality of outer appearances, and the doctrine of this ideality is called idealism, in comparison with which the assertion of a possible certainty of objects of our sense is call dualism."

Transcendental idealism is a philosophical stance established by Kant, who compares the philosophy with that of transcendental realism which:

"Considers space, time, and objects alike, to be real in themselves, quite independently from the human perception of them."

Instead, Kant proposes transcendental idealism as a philosophy that considers the "outer appearances" of objects as the "spatial-temporal objects of everyday experience – as imperfect shadows of a transcendent reality". Transcendental idealism affirms that the world and objects are real to the conditions of the human faculty and cognition. As such, objects of perception are conditioned by the mind in response to their form rather than contents.

=== Humanism ===
The term Humanism was first used by a German educationist in 1808. Humanism is a rational philosophy that seeks to understand the universe through science and inquiry-logical reasoning. Definitions of humanism have continued to evolve since its emergence as it is applied in different philosophical, cultural, and political contexts. Reactions against humanist ideologies have seen the emergence of movements such as structuralism, postmodernism and postcolonialism. In philosophy, humanism is defined as:

"...a belief in reason and autonomy as foundational aspects of human existence; a belief that reason, scepticism and the scientific method are the only appropriate instruments for discovering truth and structuring the human community; a belief that the foundations for ethics and society are to be found in autonomy and moral equality...".

==== Renaissance Humanism ====
Renaissance humanism originated in 14th century Italy and spread throughout 15th century Europe. Emerging off the back of the Middle Ages, defined by its adherence to religion as the ultimate source of knowledge, Renaissance Humanism saw a rejection of the divine. Refuting the existence of a transcendental realm, the philosophical movement considered humans as "irreducibly whole beings".

==== Classical Humanism ====
Classical humanism is a branch of education and type of consciousness. It refers to the practice of engaging with a broader cultural heritage – that of Ancient Greece and Rome. Classical humanism offers insights into:

"...the realistic epistemological and metaphysical approaches, the wholeness of the human being and the notion of person, the unity of the human action, the understanding of the society, and the eudemonistic perspective to ethics."

=== Kant's Critique of Pure Reason ===
The Critique of Pure Reason (1781) is a book written by German philosopher Immanuel Kant. The book is an investigation into the origins of human knowledge and the possibility of metaphysics. Written in response to the intellectual crisis of the Enlightenment Period (1685–1815), the Critique of Pure Reason examines the relationship between a priori and a posteriori knowledge. Explaining that knowledge is "provided by a transcendental unity of reason and experience", Kant presents a cross section of rationalist and empiricist positions.

The book deals with three main questions: a) What can I know? (b) What ought I to do? (c) What may I hope? The first questions unpacks what the nature and limit of knowledge is Kant supports the empirical claim that all knowledge originates with experience but does not agree that experience must be the only form of knowledge. The Mind, then, is understood not as a blank canvas impressionable by experience, but rather a "reservoir of a priori forms that mould the data of experience into an ordered whole".

In The Critique of Pure Reason, Kant dissects the philosophical concept of transcendental idealism through his argument that space, and time are not things in themselves, but are merely formal features of how one may perceive something. Kant defines space and time as "appearances" and argues that:

(a) Space and time are not being that exist independently, but rather forms of our sensible intuition of objects.

(b) Objects we understand or comprehend are 'appearances' and do not exist independently of our intuition.

(c) Humans can only know an object that we can intuit. As such, humans can only comprehend objects in appearances (space and time) and cannot cognise things in themselves.

(d) Humans can distinguish and cognise objects in categories.

=== Kant's Copernican Revolution ===
Kant's Copernican Revolution in philosophy deals with the causes and origins of our knowledge, as well as the limits and objective validity. Aligned with Nicholas Copernicus' proposal of a heliocentric solar system, Kant's philosophy discerns humans as the originator experience and knowledge – "that the subject doing the knowing constitutes, to a considerable extent, the object". Kant explained knowledge as part transcendental (a priori), which the mind imposes on a set of data – or experience.

"Concepts without percepts may be empty, but percepts without concepts are blind. Yet the transcendental world of ideas harbor their own contents of abstract forms, constituting a system of a priori truths, accessible through pure reason alone"

== Criticisms and academic engagement ==
Criticisms of transcendental humanism focus on its paradoxical nature. Critics have claimed there is a lack of clarity in its argumentation, suggesting that Kant's "perspectival dualism" was successful only in creating a transcendental psychologism which is considered incapable of solving "largely imaginary" issues. There are differing arguments and interpretations of Kant's transcendental philosophy as either a form of phenomenalism, or not a metaphysical or ontological theory at all.

English philosopher and professor, P. F. Strawson, critiqued Kant's transcendental humanism in his body of work The Bounds of Sense: An Essay on Kant's Critique of Pure Reason. Strawson was the Waynflete Professor of Metaphysical Philosophy at the University of Oxford from 1968 to 1987. Strawson states the theory is "completely unintelligible" and dismisses the "imaginary subject of transcendental psychology" as belonging to neither "empirical ..., nor to an analytic philosophy of mind".

James T. Hansen in The Journal of Humanistic Counselling, Education and Development states that "the transcendental portion of humanism is like an anchor that severely limits the growth and power of humanistic ideology". The journal instead discusses a need for non-transcendental humanism that disengages from the idea of ultimate truths. The critic considers Darwinism as the alternate ideology that rejects transcendence and equates humans and animals as more relevant and influential in philosophical thinking.

== See also ==
- Humanistic naturalism
