= Integral theory (disambiguation) =

Integral theory may refer to:

- Integral theory (Ken Wilber), an attempt to place a wide diversity of theories and thinkers into one single framework
- Integral theory (Ervin László) or Akashic field theory, a theory of information and systems

== See also ==
- A Theory of Everything, 2000 book by Ken Wilber detailing his theory
- Integral yoga, yoga-based philosophy and practice of Sri Aurobindo
- California Institute of Integral Studies, a university in San Francisco, California
- Integral (disambiguation)
- Theory of everything (disambiguation)
