= Epistemic privilege =

Philosophical concept

Epistemic privilege or privileged access is the philosophical concept that certain knowledge, such as knowledge of one's own thoughts, can be apprehended directly by a given person and not by others. This implies one has access to, and direct self-knowledge of, their own thoughts in such a way that others do not. The concept can also refer to the notion of having privileged, non-perspectival access to knowledge of things about reality or things beyond one's own mind. Epistemic privilege can be characterized in two ways:

- Positive characterization: privileged access comes through introspection.
- Negative characterization: knowledge derived from privileged access is not based upon evidences.

== Analysis ==
The still prevailing traditional position argues each of us do in fact have privileged access to our own thoughts. Descartes is the paradigmatic proponent of such kind of view (even though "privileged access" is an anachronic label for his thesis):

While we thus reject all of which we can entertain the smallest doubt, and even imagine that it is false, we easily indeed suppose that there is neither God, nor sky, nor bodies, and that we ourselves even have neither hands nor feet, nor, finally, a body; but we cannot in the same way suppose that we are not while we doubt of the truth of these things; for there is a repugnance in conceiving that what thinks does not exist at the very time when it thinks. Accordingly, the knowledge, I THINK, THEREFORE I AM, is the first and most certain that occurs to one who philosophizes orderly.

For Descartes, we still have privileged access even in the doubt scenario. That is, for him we would retain self-knowledge even in those extreme situations in which we can not have knowledge about anything else.

Gilbert Ryle, on the other hand, maintains a diametrically opposed view. According to the behaviorism of Ryle, each of us knows our own thoughts in the same way we know other's thoughts. We only come to know the thoughts of others through their linguistic and bodily behaviors, and must do exactly the same in order to know our own thoughts. There is no privileged access. We only have access to what we think upon evidences supplied through our own actions.
