= Paul Moser =

American philosopher (born 1957)

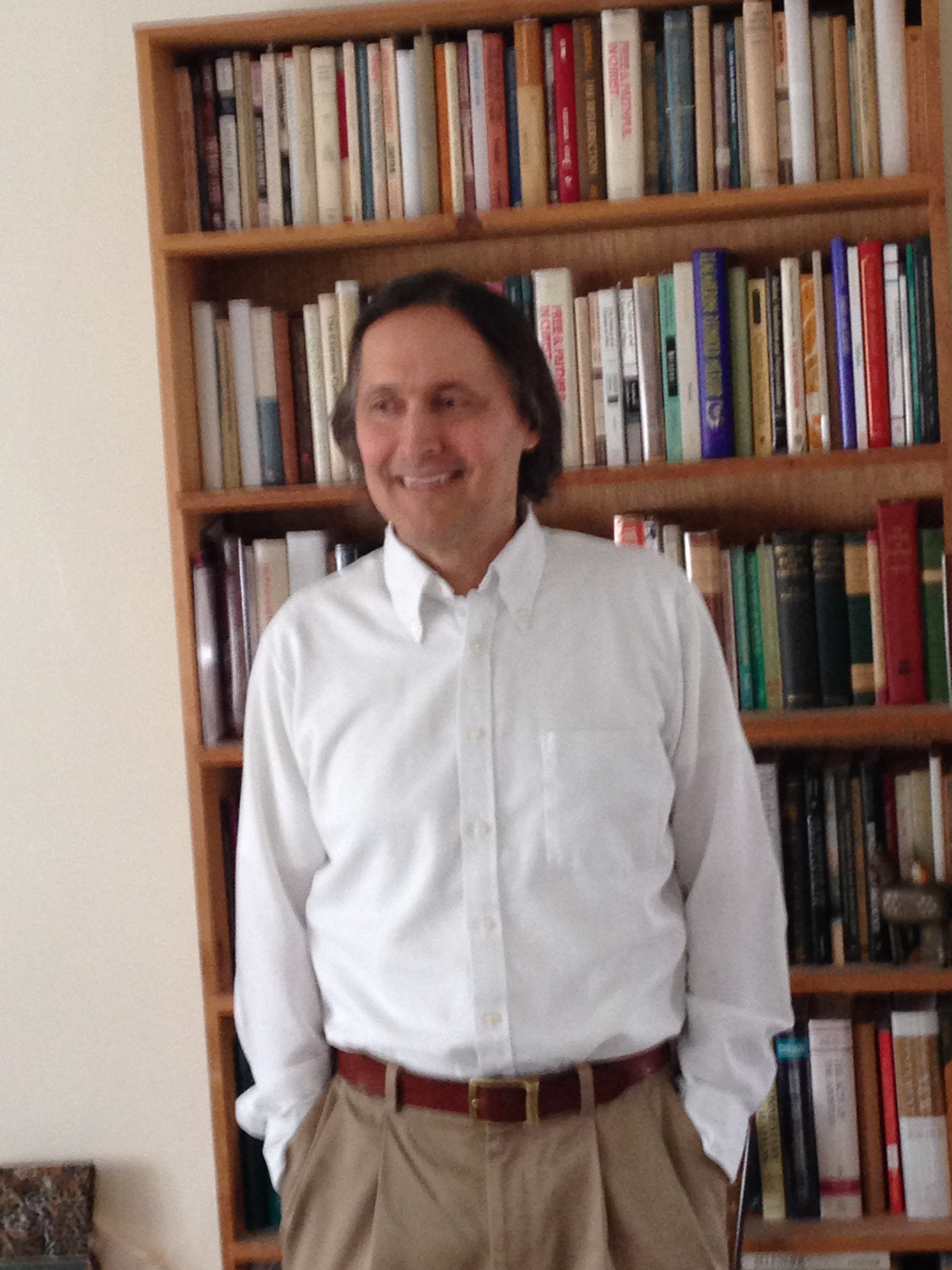
Paul Moser

Paul K. Moser (born 1957 in Bismarck, North Dakota) is an American philosopher who writes on epistemology and the philosophy of religion. Moser is Professor of Philosophy Emeritus at Loyola University Chicago and a former editor of the American Philosophical Quarterly.

Critics have described Moser as a sceptic of natural theology and a reformed epistemologist. Moser has described himself as an evidentialist.

== Works ==
- Empirical Justification, D. Reidel Publishing Company, 1985
- Human Knowledge, Oxford University Press, 1987
- Knowledge and Evidence, Cambridge University Press, 1989
- Philosophy After Objectivity: Making Sense in Perspective, Oxford University Press, 1993
- Divine Hiddenness: New Essays, Cambridge University Press, 2001
- The Elusive God: Reorienting Religious Epistemology, Cambridge University Press, 2008
- Jesus and Philosophy: New Essays, Cambridge University Press, 2009
- The Evidence for God: Religious Knowledge Reexamined, Cambridge University Press, 2010
- The Severity of God: Religion and Philosophy Reconceived, Cambridge University Press, 2013
- The God Relationship: The Ethics for Inquiry about the Divine, Cambridge University Press, 2017
- Understanding Religious Experience: From Conviction to Life's Meaning, Cambridge University Press, 2019
- The Divine Goodness of Jesus: Impact and Response, Cambridge University Press, 2021
- Paul's Gospel of Divine Self-Sacrifice: Righteous Reconciliation in Reciprocity, Cambridge University Press, 2022.
- Divine Guidance: Moral Attraction in Action, Cambridge University Press, 2022.
- God in Moral Experience: Values and Duties Personified, Cambridge University Press, 2023
- God on Trial: Testing for the Divine, Fortress Press, 2025.

== See also ==
- American philosophy
- List of American philosophers
