= The Journal of Humanistic Counseling =

- Discipline: Humanistic psychology
- Language: English
- Edited by: Brett D. Wilkinson

Publication details
- Former name(s): SPATE: Journal of Student Personnel Association for Teacher Education; The Humanist Educator; The Journal of Humanistic Education and Development; The Journal of Humanistic Counseling, Education and Development
- History: 1961-present
- Publisher: Wiley-Blackwell on behalf of the American Counseling Association
- Frequency: Biannual

Standard abbreviations
- ISO 4: J. Humanist. Couns.

Indexing
- ISSN: 2159-0311 (print); 2161-1939 (web)
- LCCN: 2010203764
- OCLC no.: 774112610

Links
- Journal homepage; Online access; Online archive

The Journal of Humanistic Counseling is a quarterly peer-reviewed academic journal published by Wiley-Blackwell on behalf of the Association for Humanistic Counseling, a division of the American Counseling Association. The editor-in-chief is Brett D. Wilkinson (Purdue University Fort Wayne). The journal explores humanistic counseling practices and experiential-developmental counseling processes, broadly conceived. It aims to disseminate contemporary humanistic scholarship and research that support practitioner growth, training program development, and the vital promotion of inclusivity and diversity across worldviews.

== History ==
The journal was established in 1961 as SPATE: Journal of Student Personnel Association for Teacher Education, a name it retained until 1975. It was then subsequently known as The Humanist Educator (1975–1982), The Journal of Humanistic Education and Development (1982–1999), and The Journal of Humanistic Counseling, Education and Development (1999–2010). It obtained its current name in 2011.

== Abstracting and indexing ==
The journal is abstracted and indexed in:

- Academic Search Complete
- Education Research Complete
- Education Resources Information Center
- Higher Education Abstracts
- Scopus
