= Problem of the criterion =

Philosophical problem about the starting point of knowledge

In the field of epistemology, the problem of the criterion is an issue regarding the starting point of knowledge. This is a separate and more fundamental issue than the regress argument found in discussions on justification of knowledge.

In Western philosophy, the earliest surviving documentation of the problem of the criterion is in the works of the Pyrrhonist philosopher Sextus Empiricus. In Outlines of Pyrrhonism Sextus Empiricus demonstrated that no criterion of truth had been established, contrary to the position of dogmatists such as the Stoics and their doctrine of katalepsis. In this Sextus was repeating or building upon earlier Pyrrhonist arguments about the problem of the criterion, as Pyrrho, the founder of Pyrrhonism, had declared that "neither our sense-perceptions nor our doxai (views, theories, beliefs) tell us the truth or lie.

American philosopher Roderick Chisholm in his Theory of Knowledge details the problem of the criterion with two sets of questions:

1. What do we know? or What is the extent of our knowledge?
2. How do we know? or What is the criterion for deciding whether we have knowledge in any particular case?

An answer to either set of questions will allow us to devise a means of answering the other. Answering the former question set first is called particularism, whereas answering the latter set first is called methodism. A third solution is skepticism, which proclaims that since one cannot have an answer to the first set of questions without first answering the second set, and one cannot hope to answer the second set of questions without first knowing the answers to the first set, we are, therefore, unable to answer either. This has the result of us being unable to justify any of our beliefs.

Particularist theories organize things already known and attempt to use these particulars of knowledge to find a method of how we know, thus answering the second question set. Methodist theories propose an answer to question set two and proceed to use this to establish what we, in fact, know. Classical empiricism embraces the particulist approach.

== See also ==
- Acatalepsy
- Meno's paradox
- Münchhausen trilemma
