= Metadiscourse =

Concept in philosophy of language

In philosophy of language, metadiscourse is the discussion about a discussion, as opposed to a simple discussion about a given topic. The study of metadiscourse helps us recognize and understand how we situate our ideas within writing and speech. This subject is especially prevalent in science writing, where it presents itself in many different forms such as hedges, boosters, and attitude markers. Metadiscourse contained within a written work can be any phrase that is included within a clause or sentence that goes beyond the subject itself, often to examine the purpose of the sentence or a response from the author, usually as an introductory adverbial clause. Metadiscourse often includes phrases such as "frankly," "after all," "on the other hand," "to our surprise," and so on.

Below are some examples of metadiscourse in writing, denoting:

- the writer's intentions: "to sum up," "candidly," "I believe"
- the writer's confidence: "may," "perhaps," "certainly," "must"
- directions to the reader: "note that," "finally," "therefore," "however"
- the structure of the text, including transitions: "first," "second," "finally," "therefore," "however"

Joseph M. Williams summed up the use of metadiscourse in expository writing as follows:

Everything you write needs metadiscourse, but too much buries your ideas […] Some teachers and editors urge us to cut all metadiscourse, but everything we write needs some. You have to read with an eye to how good writers in your field use it, then do likewise. There are, however, some types that you can usually cut. [Examples follow.]

== Hedges ==
Hedges are words and phrases that communicate caution to the claim being made within a sentence. Hedge words are removed from the actual subject and rather function as a marker of metadiscourse. These words and phrases ensure that an audience is aware of the writer's distance from the subject they are reporting on. This technique allows writers to maintain the reliability of their work by establishing that their assertions are made to their best knowledge, but could potentially be rebutted. Some examples of metadiscursive hedges are "could," "unlikely," "perhaps," "occasionally," "evidently," "generally," and "many."

== Boosters ==
In writing, a booster is a word or phrase that enhances a point the writer makes. Boosters can be identified by examples such as "certainly," "absolutely," "obviously," "always," and "demonstrate."

== Attitude markers ==
Attitude markers appear when writers signal their feelings towards a subject with certain words or phrases. This type of metadiscourse may show up in writing in the use of words like "unfortunately," "admirably," and "agree."

== Hedging in science writing ==
In science writing specifically, hedging allows writers to publish scientific information without it coming across as absolute or hypercritical in nature. Therefore, science writers use hedging to communicate knowledge in a way that avoids making non-expert audiences entirely confident in the text. Hedging in science writing may look like this:

Hedge	Example Sentence
May	Inhaling the gas produced by the experiment may cause hypoxia.
Appear	The data collected appears to support the hypothesis.
Possible	It is possible that the species will be extinct within the next decade.
Usually	The trial results usually remain consistent.
Tend	Scientists in this area of study tend to rely on clinical trials to conduct their research.
Probably	The symptoms were probably a result of the patient's exposure to cigarette smoke.

In some cases, using hedges in science writing can disrupt the way scientific information is processed by the reader by making the statement seem slightly uncertain. This is purposeful and allows science writers to establish their distance from the topic of study, while still reporting the relevant findings of the experts.

== Boosting in science writing ==
Boosters appear in science writing to strengthen a statement that is being made. These words and phrases allow non-expert readers to grasp the certainty of a claim.

Booster	Example Sentence
Certainly	Early trials of the new gene therapy reveal certainly promising results.
Always	This chemical reaction will always result in combustion.
Demonstrate	These findings demonstrate the accuracy of the original hypothesis.

== Attitude marking in science writing ==
In science writing, attitude marking is a valuable technique that is used to bring humanity into a body of text. To a non-expert audience, scientific information can seem dry and difficult to consume, and attitude marking allows readers to gauge the way they might feel inclined to react to the information they are taking in.

Attitude Marker	Example Sentence
Unfortunately	The prognosis was, unfortunately, very poor for each of the research patients.
Agree	After conducting two separate studies, both the neuroscientists and psychiatrists agree on the diagnosis.

== Transitions ==
Transitions show, and sometimes emphasize, how one sentence relates to the next or how one paragraph or section relates to the next. As a form of metadiscourse they function as signposts leading the reader through a discussion.
