= Methodism (philosophy) =

In the study of knowledge, methodism refers to the epistemological approach where one asks "How do we know?" before "What do we know?" The term appears in Roderick Chisholm's "The Problem of the Criterion", and in the work of his student, Ernest Sosa ("The Raft and the Pyramid: Coherence versus Foundations in the Theory of Knowledge").

Methodism is contrasted with particularism, which answers the latter question before the former.

Since the question "How do we know?" does not presuppose that we know, it is receptive to skepticism. In this way, Sosa claims, Hume no less than Descartes was an epistemological methodist.

== See also ==
- Methodology
