= Epistemological particularism =

Philosophical theory

Epistemological particularism is the view that one can know something without knowing how one knows it. By this view, one's knowledge is justified before one knows how such belief could be justified. Taking this as a philosophical approach, one would ask the question "What do we know?" before asking "How do we know?" The term appears in Roderick Chisholm's "The Problem of the Criterion", and in the work of his student, Ernest Sosa ("The Raft and the Pyramid: Coherence versus Foundations in the Theory of Knowledge"). Particularism is contrasted with methodism, which answers the latter question before the former. Since the question "What do we know" implies that we know, particularism is considered fundamentally anti-skeptical, and was ridiculed by Kant in the Prolegomena.
