= Theory of everything (disambiguation) =

A theory of everything is a hypothetical physical theory that would explain all known physical phenomena.

Theory of everything may also refer to:

== Philosophy ==
- Theory of everything (philosophy), a hypothetical all-encompassing philosophical explanation of nature or reality
- A Theory of Everything, a book by Ken Wilber dealing with his "integral theory"

== Film and television ==
- "The Theory of Everything" (CSI), an episode of CSI: Crime Scene Investigation
- The Theory of Everything (2006 film), a TV film
- The Theory of Everything (2014 film), a biographical film about Stephen and Jane Hawking
- The Theory of Everything (2023 film), a mystery thriller film

== Music ==
- Theory of Everything (album), 2010 album by Children Collide
- The Theory of Everything (Ayreon album), 2013
- The Theory of Everything (Life on Planet 9 album), 2014

== See also ==
- Theory of Everything (podcast), a radio show and then podcast by Benjamen Walker
- Toe (disambiguation)
