= Archimedean point =

Hypothetical "God's-eye view" of the world

An Archimedean point (Latin: Punctum Archimedis) is a hypothetical viewpoint from which certain objective truths can perfectly be perceived (also known as a God's-eye view) or a reliable starting point from which one may reason. In other words, a view from an Archimedean point describes the ideal of removing oneself from the object of study so that one can see it in relation to all other things while remaining independent of them.

For example, the philosopher John Rawls uses the heuristic device of the original position in an attempt to remove the particular biases of individual agents to demonstrate how rational beings might arrive at an objective formulation of justice.

== Origins ==
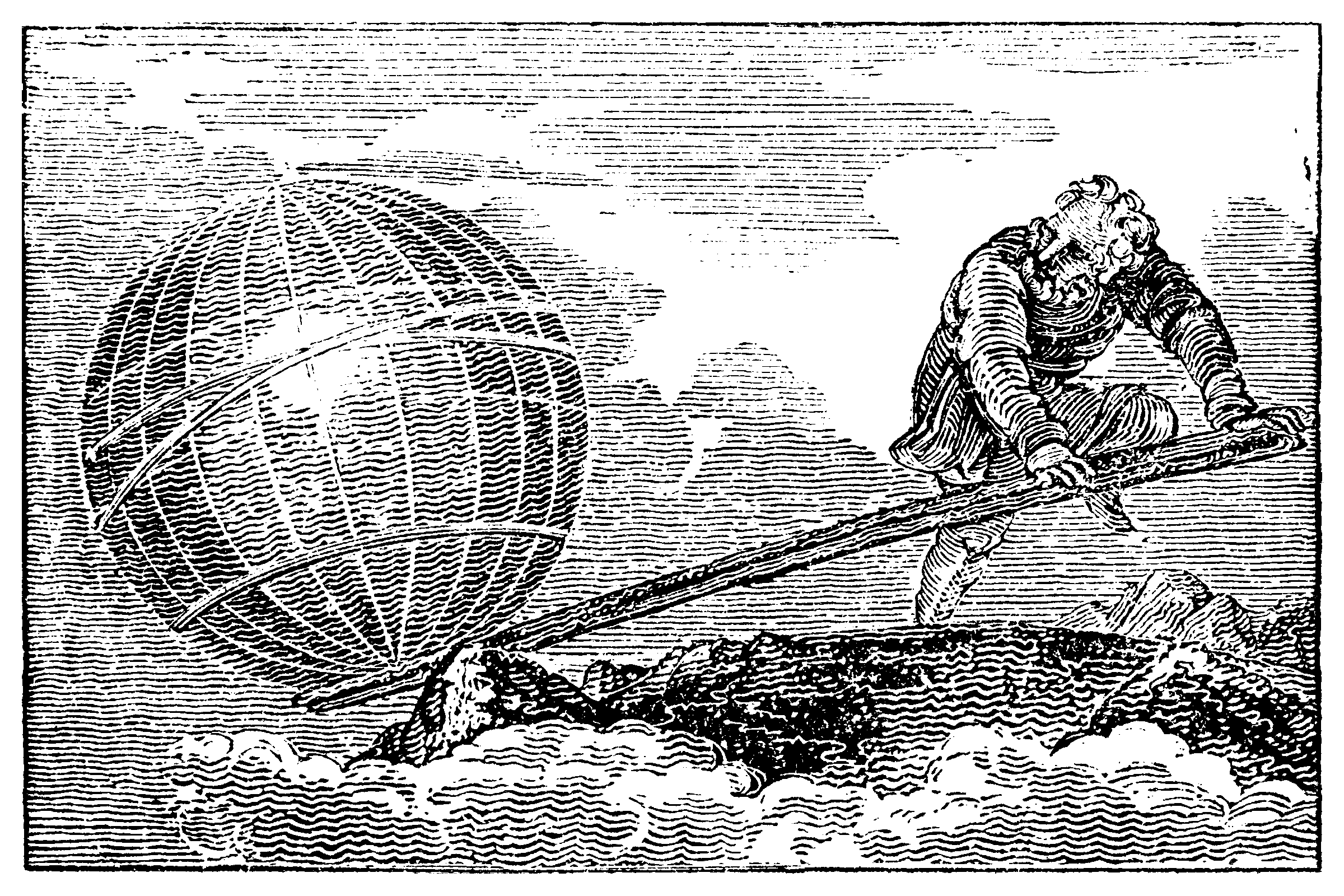
Archimedes lever, engraving from Mechanics Magazine, London 1824

The term refers to the great mathematician Archimedes, who supposedly claimed that he could lift the Earth off its foundation if he were given a place to stand, one solid point, and a long enough lever.

The idea for the term is attributed to Descartes in his second Meditation, who refers to Archimedes requiring only "a point that was firm and immovable," with regard to finding certainty:

Archimedes, that he might transport the entire globe from the place it occupied to another, demanded only a point that was firm and immovable; so, also, I shall be entitled to entertain the highest expectations, if I am fortunate enough to discover only one thing that is certain and indubitable.

== Criticism ==
Sceptical and anti-realist philosophers criticise the possibility of an Archimedean point, claiming that "such an alleged standpoint is merely fantastical" and that the alleged objectivity of the view is mythical.

== See also ==
- Bird's-eye view
- Observer effect (physics)
- Objectivity (philosophy)
- Objectivity (science)
- The Aleph (short story)
