= Epistemic motivation =

Desire to fully understand a situation

Epistemic motivation is the desire to develop and maintain a rich and thorough understanding of a situation, utilizing one's beliefs towards knowledge and the process of building knowledge. A learner's motivation towards knowledge as an object influences their knowledge acquisition. In interpersonal relations, epistemic motivation is the desire to process information thoroughly, and thus grasp the meaning behind other people's emotions. In group settings, epistemic motivation can be defined as participants' willingness to expend effort to achieve a thorough, rich, and accurate understanding of the world, including the group task, or decision problem at hand, and the degree to which group members tend to systematically process and disseminate information.

== Lay Epistemic Theory ==
Epistemic motivation derives from the broader theory of lay epistemics, which addresses the processes in which individuals form their knowledge in regards to varied topics, such as all possible contents of knowledge, including attitudes, beliefs, causal attributions, impressions, opinions, statistical inferences, and stereotypes. The theory assumes that much of social conduce, affect, or cognition is related to what people know, or feel they know, about various matters. Under the umbrella of Lay Epistemic Theory (LET), research on factors involved in a general knowledge formation process have been conducted for over thirty years. LET inspired three separate, but interrelated, research programs: the need for cognitive closure, the unimodel of social judgment, and epistemic authority. Since the 1980s, one of the most prominent researchers in epistemics has been social psychologist Arie W. Kruglanski, who has authored numerous publications over the years, with particular contributions to cognitive closure.

=== Need for cognitive closure ===
A main assumption of LET is that knowledge, or conclusions, comes from evidence. This conclusion can also be thought of as a hypothesis that is supported by evidence. In theory, a person can continue testing hypotheses indefinitely, without ever solidifying knowledge. Therefore, people may form judgments quickly, based on available evidence. This occurs through the mechanism of cognitive closure. The need for cognitive closure is an epistemic motivation that advances knowledge formation and has widely ramifying consequences for individual, interpersonal, and group phenomena.

==== Nonspecific vs. specific closure ====
This need for cognitive closure has been categorized into two sub-types, referred to as the needs for nonspecific, and specific, closure.

- Nonspecific closure refers to a desire for a firm answer to a question, as opposed to confusion or ambiguity.
- Specific closure refers to a desire to acquire a specific, personally desirable, answer to a question.

Both needs may vary in degree, and lie on a continuum. Therefore, a person may want closure strongly, moderately, or not at all.

==== Seizing and Freezing ====
An elevated need for closure prompts the tendency to "seize" on initial evidence and then "freeze" on the judgments it suggests. Time pressure has been found to increase participants' tendency to seize on "anchors" provided before a task, while fear of invalidity reduced this behavior.

=== The unimodel of social judgement ===
The unimodel investigates the process of new knowledge formation from the information given, and focuses on the evidential basis of all knowledge. It includes both cognitive and motivational factors, which affect informational impact.

==== Resource availability ====
If the resources to process information are limited, then the information that is easier to process will have a higher likelihood to be utilized, and to affect judgements to a higher degree, than the information that is difficult to process. Conversely, when processing resources are plentiful, then the difficult to process information will be utilized more to the extent that it is seen to be of greater relevance than the easily processable information.

=== Epistemic authority ===
Epistemic authority refers to a source that an individual may depend on for knowledge acquisition. The work on epistemic authority highlights the centrality, and special role of social source effects, including the self as a source, in the knowledge formation process.

== Multi-disciplinary impact ==
Epistemic motivation has been utilized by researchers and professionals across multiple areas of study, from cognitive science, to emotions and organizational behavior, to creativity & innovation, and politics and public policy, to highlight only a few.

=== Information processing ===
Information can be processed in a quick and effortless, heuristic way, or, in an effortful, deliberate, and systematic way. Which style of information processing an individual will engage in, depends on their epistemic motivation. Heightened epistemic motivation has been shown to decrease the selective use of information, discourage the use of stereotypes and heuristics, focus information search on diagnostic information, reduce the tendency to reject divergent opinions, and increase the tendency to engage in systematic information processing. An experiment in the Netherlands showed that groups under process accountability experienced a greater need for more information, repeated unshared information more frequently, and more often chose the correct decision alternative. Further analyses showed that epistemic motivation produced high quality decisions due to the fact that it stimulated systematic information processing. Higher levels of epistemic motivation led groups to initially doubt the sufficiency of information available to them, and for groups with higher levels of epistemic motivation, their group discussions resulted in better decision quality, as compared to groups that had lower levels of epistemic motivation.

=== Emotions ===
Epistemic motivation may influence the processing of information conveyed by emotional displays. Researchers demonstrated, both in the lab and in the field, that negotiators only used the task-relevant information, provided by their opponents’ emotions, to inform their negotiation strategies when they were sufficiently epistemically motivated. Additional research found that a leader's emotional displays influence their team's performance. In particular, their team's performance is influenced by the extent to which happiness versus anger is conveyed by the leader. Members' use of their own emotions, as guides for their own behavior, is also determined by the team's level of epistemic motivation. Hence, members' using their own emotions, as guides for their own behavior, are more likely when their epistemic motivation is low, as opposed to instead guiding their behavior according to the emotional displays of their leader, which are more likely when their epistemic motivation is high. The effectiveness of the leader's displays of happiness or anger are also determined by the team's epistemic motivation. For example, the tendency for team performance to improve after a leader displays happiness is stronger when teams are low in epistemic motivation, because they are guided by their affective reactions. Conversely, the tendency for teams to perform better following leader displays of anger are stronger when teams are high in epistemic motivation, because they are guided by their performance inferences. When teams have high epistemic motivation, their members will pay attention to the meaning of emotion, and the task-relevant information pathway will be more potent. When teams have low epistemic motivation, their members will passively contract emotions, and the affective reactions pathway will be more powerful. Mental fatigue and time pressure during stressful periods also impact emotional processing, by making team members more likely to simply react to a leader's mood, than to think carefully about his or her message. A 2015 study found that individuals high in epistemic motivation were more sensitive to negative emotional stimuli than individuals with low epistemic motivation, in an interpersonal, decision-making task.

=== Creativity, innovation and education ===
Group creativity and innovation are both considered a function of epistemic motivation. Characteristics that are associated with low levels of epistemic motivation, such as the need for closure, or the fear of invalidity, negatively correlate with individual creativity. Conversely, characteristics that are associated with high epistemic motivation, such as openness to experience, high rather than low need for cognition, and low, rather than high, need for structure and aversion ambiguity, correlate positively with many indicators of creativity. Thus, groups populated by individuals with high openness to experience, high need for cognition, or low ambiguity aversion can be expected to have higher average epistemic motivation and, therefore, to engage in more, rather than less, systematic and deliberate information search and processing, leading to higher creativity and innovation. Similar results have been reported at the group-level. Research has found that group members working on a joint task displayed greater levels of creativity when they had low, rather than high, needs for nonspecific closure, or when time pressure was mild, rather than acute. Focusing on group heterogeneity, researchers found that teams with transformational leaders, and greater educational specialization heterogeneity, displayed greater team creativity. These findings suggest that individual members of groups become more creative when they have high, rather than low, epistemic motivation. To the extent that group-level creativity is the combined output of individual performances, groups can be expected to become more creative, as the group's average epistemic motivation is enhanced.

A study in the Netherlands found that participants with high epistemic motivation exhibited greater fluency, originality, and flexibility after receiving angry, rather than neutral, feedback on an idea generation task, whereas those with low epistemic motivation were less creative after receiving angry feedback. These effects were mediated by task engagement and motivation, which anger increased amongst participants with high epistemic motivation. Conversely, anger decreased task engagement and motivation amongst participants with low epistemic motivation. Other research has found that people with high epistemic motivation may be less inclined to disengage from creative, idea-generation tasks, when faced with interfering expressions of anger, than their less epistemically motivated counterparts.

In line with research on the role of epistemic motivation in educational outcomes, epistemic motivation is an important predictor of citizens' engagement with science and technology.

=== System justification ===
The epistemic motivation of the need for cognitive closure has been linked with uncertainty motivation and the personal need for structure. Evidence suggests that those who are generally tolerant of ambiguity and uncertainty are less likely to use stereotypes as a manner in which to rationalize inequality and preserve the status quo. Evidence has been presented that connects epistemic motivation to authoritarianism, dogmatism, political conservatism, and social stereotyping. For example, the personal need for structure is associated with the formation of erroneous group stereotypes. Epistemic motives then exacerbate these stereotypes, as a method for rationalizing outcomes and justifying inequality. One study's finding that conservative ideologies promote the justification of economic inequality was also supported by follow up research. There are some findings to suggest that epistemic motivation, specifically the needs for closure and certainty, make good partners with ideologies that are traditional, conservative, or right-wing. However, research also shows that epistemic motivation can lead people to adhere more strongly to their original ideological positions, either politically left or right. Furthermore, counter to much of the research that has linked epistemic motivation to the right, a group of researchers found in their study that the need for closure was most strongly associated with policy conservatism among people who symbolically identified as liberals, or for whom liberal considerations were made salient.

== Etymology ==
Epistemology is the area of philosophy dealing with the theory of knowledge. The term derives from the Ancient Greek word "epistēmē", that refers to knowledge, science, or understanding.
