= Richard Fumerton =

Canadian American philosopher

- Born: October 7, 1949 (age 76); Toronto, Ontario

Education
- Education: University of Toronto (B.A.); Brown University (M.A., PhD)
- Thesis: Phenomenalism (1974)
- Doctoral advisors: Roderick Chisholm, Ernest Sosa, J. Van Cleve

Philosophical work
- Era: Contemporary philosophy
- Region: Western philosophy
- School: Analytic philosophy
- Main interests: Epistemology, metaphysics, philosophy of mind, value theory
- Notable ideas: Metaepistemological scepticism; Principle of inferential justification

Richard Anthony Fumerton (born October 7, 1949) is a Canadian American philosopher and professor of philosophy at the University of Iowa with research interests in epistemology, metaphysics, philosophy of mind and value theory. He has been cited as an influential expert on the position of "metaepistemological scepticism". He received his B.A. in philosophy from the University of Toronto in 1971 and his M.A. and PhD from Brown University in 1973 and 1974, respectively. He has been the F. Wendell Miller Professor of Philosophy at the University of Iowa since 2003.

== Philosophical views ==
Fumerton has argued for a classical internalist form of foundationalism in which foundationally justified beliefs are justified non-inferentially. Specifically, Fumerton believes that for a belief to be non-inferentially justified, it must be justified by direct acquaintance with facts and the correspondence between those facts and the belief in question. Fumerton's foundationalism is classical or "old-fashioned" in that it claims that foundationally justified beliefs are beliefs about one's states of mind rather than beliefs about the external world. Given this fact, Fumerton has argued that we cannot have the philosophical assurance required for knowledge about the external world. He has argued that whilst externalist theories of justification provide non-inferentially justified beliefs about the external world, these justifications are "philosophically unsatisfying" and cannot provide philosophical assurance for beliefs about the external world. Given these arguments, Fumerton thinks that there is no philosophically satisfying account of how we could know about the external world, a view known as "metaepistemological scepticism". He has also argued for a "principle of inferential justification" that states that for a subject S to be justified in believing a proposition P on the basis of another proposition E, S must be justified in believing that E and they must be justified in believing that E makes P probable.

In philosophical inquiry into the nature of rationality, Fumerton has been credited by Richard Foley with formulating a problem that Foley calls "Fumerton's puzzle". A theory of rationality attempts to provide the conditions C under which a belief or decision is rational. Fumerton's puzzle arises when candidate conditions are met, but an agent rationally believes that they are not met. Assuming that the agent believes that C must be met for their belief or decision to be rational, then in this case they would rationally believe that their belief or decision is irrational even though it satisfies the conditions C. When paired with the idea that it is irrational to have a belief or make a decision if one rationally believes that it is irrational, this implies that a belief or decision can be irrational even if C are satisfied. But this means that C are not sufficient conditions for rationality, implying that finding such conditions is impossible. Fumerton's puzzle can also occur when the conditions are not met, but an agent rationally believes that they are. In such a case, the agent would rationally believe that their belief or decision is rational. However, the agent's rational belief that their belief or decision is rational seems sufficient to make them rational even if C is not satisfied. This implies that C are not necessary conditions for a belief or decision to be rational.

Fumerton defended mind-body dualism in his book Knowledge, Thought and the Case for Dualism, published in 2013.

== Publications ==
- Foundationalism. Cambridge University Press. 2022.
- A Consequentialist Defense of Libertarianism. Rowman & Littlefield, 2021.
- Knowledge, Thought and the Case for Dualism. Cambridge University Press, 2013.
- An Introduction to Political Philosophy: Theory and Applications, co-edited with Diane Jeske. Broadview Press, 2012.
- Philosophy Through Film, co-edited with Diane Jeske. Blackwell Publishing, 2009.
- The Philosophy of John Stuart Mill, with Wendy Donner. Blackwell Publishing, 2009.
- Epistemology. Oxford and Cambridge: Blackwell Publishing, 2006.
- Realism and The Correspondence Theory of Truth. Boston: Rowman & Littlefield, 2002.
- Metaepistemology and Skepticism. Boston: Rowman & Littlefield, 1996.
- Reason and Morality: A Defense of the Egocentric Perspective. Ithaca, N.Y: Cornell University Press, 1990.
- Metaphysical and Epistemological Problems of Perception. Lincoln and London: University of Nebraska Press, 1985.
