= Gregory Pence =

American philosopher (born 1948)

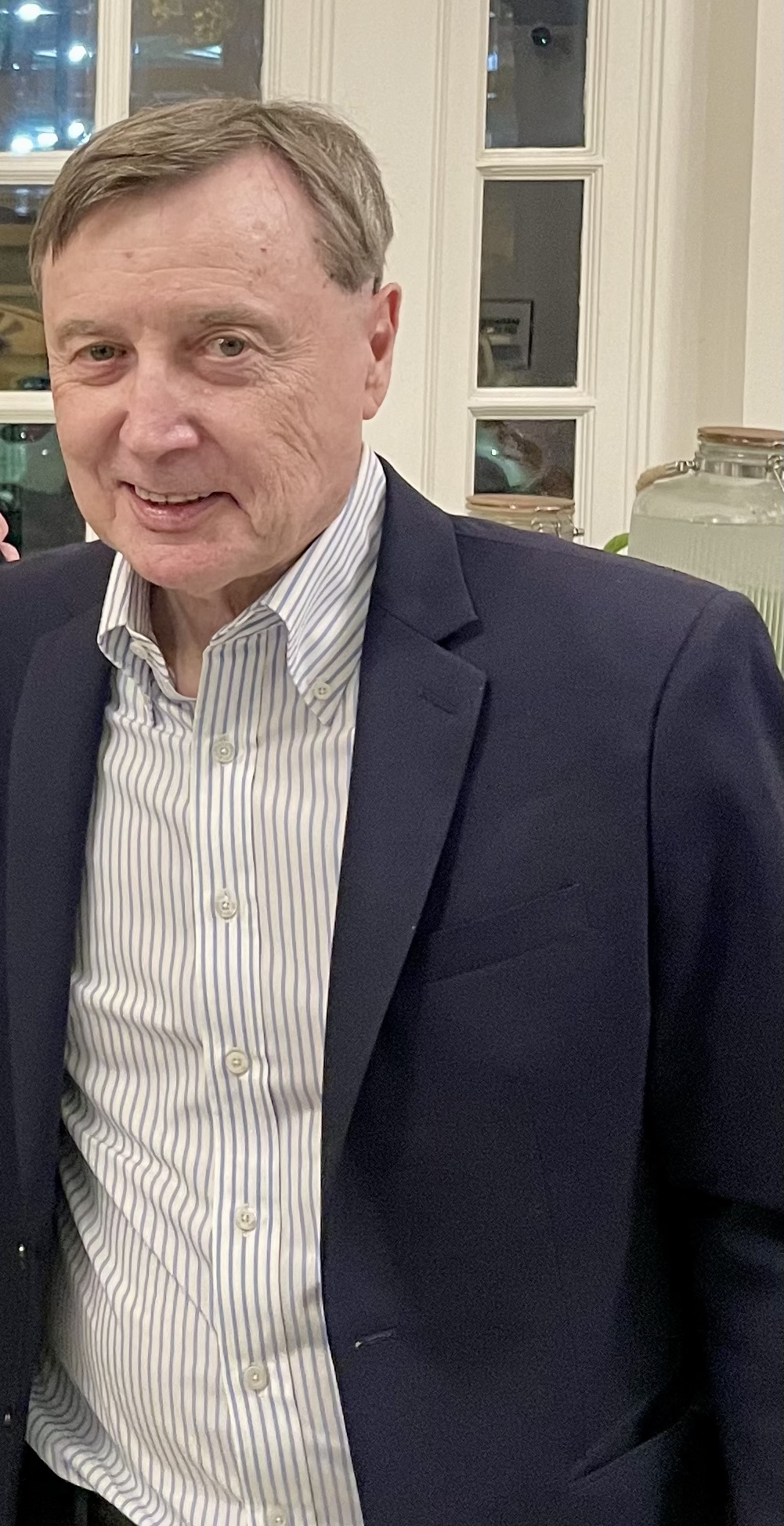
- Born: January 17, 1948 (age 78); Washington D.C., U.S.
- Education: William & Mary (BA); New York University (PhD)

Gregory E. Pence (born January 17, 1948) is an American philosopher.

== Biography ==
Pence graduated cum laude with a B.A. from William and Mary and a Ph.D. from New York University, writing under visiting Australian bioethicist Peter Singer. Pence taught a required course in bioethics for 34 years to 165 medical students at the University of Alabama School of Medicine. In 2006, Samford University awarded him a Pellegrino Medal for achievement in medical ethics. In 2012, he stopped teaching in medical school to chair the UAB Department of Philosophy, which he did until 2018. Since 1995, he has directed at UAB the EMSAP Program (Early Medical and Dental School Acceptance Program).

His well-known work defending human cloning has labeled him a rebel in popular culture. Some critics, especially GreenPeace of Europe, consider him an apologist for the safety of GM foods. As displayed in his many books on human cloning (Who's Afraid of Cloning, etc.), he is one of the few bioethicists who believes that human cloning should not be banned but rather accepted in modern society as a future tool for creating wanted children. In 2001, Pence testified before the US Congress against a bill that would have criminalized all aspects of human cloning. His many books, and over 70 op-ed essays, explain his views about assisted reproduction, human cloning, and various topics in bioethics.

In 2015, he was invited to write for "American National Biography" the official biography of agricultural pioneer Norman Borlaug, a strong defender of genetically modified food.

His textbook, Medical Ethics, one of the field's standards, was 34 years old in 2024, now in its 10th edition. At UAB, he won major teaching awards, including the Ingall's and President's. He coached the UAB team that in 2010 won the national championship of the Intercollegiate Ethics Bowl., and UAB teams that won the national championship of the Bioethics Bowl in 2011 at Duke University, in 2015 at Florida State University. and in 2019 at the University of South Alabama. In 2024, he became the first recipient of the Outstanding Service Award for the Bioethics Bowl.

His 2002 and 2020 tradebooks Designer Food and Overcoming Addiction were named Outstanding Academic Books by CHOICE magazine. In 2019, his university awarded him its Ireland Award for Scholarly Distinction. In 2024, its Alumni Society chose him for its Honorary Faculty Award.

In 2025 he started the first weekly YouTube channel by a philosopher, Great Stories in Bioethics.

== Publications ==
=== Books ===
Pence has authored the following books:

- Classic Cases in Medical Ethics: Accounts of the Cases that Have Shaped Medical Ethics. New York, NY: McGraw-Hill. 1990. ISBN 978-0-07-038092-9.
  - 2nd ed. 1995 ISBN 978-0-07-038094-3, Internet Archive (registration required)
  - 3rd ed. 2000 ISBN 978-0-07-303986-2
  - 4th ed. 2004 ISBN 978-0-07-282935-8, Internet Archive (registration required)
  - 5th ed. 2008 ISBN 978-0-07-353573-9, Internet Archive (registration required)
  - 6th ed. 2011 ISBN 978-0-07-340749-4
  - 7th ed. 2015 ISBN 978-0-07-803845-7
  - 8th ed. 2017 ISBN 978-1-259-90794-4
  - 10th ed. 2024 ISBN 978-1-266-55568-8
- Ethical Options in Medicine. Oradell, NJ: Medical Economics Books. 1990. ISBN 978-0-87489-233-8.
- Who's Afraid of Human Cloning?. Lanham, MD: Rowman & Littlefield. 1998. ISBN 978-0-8476-8782-4.
- Re-Creating Medicine: Ethical Issues at the Frontiers of Medicine. Lanham, MD: Rowman & Littlefield. 2000. ISBN 978-0-8476-9690-1.
- Designer Food: Mutant Harvest or Breadbasket of the World?. Lanham, MD: Rowman & Littlefield. 2002. ISBN 978-0-7425-0839-2.
- Brave New Bioethics. Lanham, MD: Rowman & Littlefield. 2003. ISBN 978-0-7425-1436-2.
- Cloning After Dolly: Who's Still Afraid?. Lanham, MD: Rowman & Littlefield. 2004. ISBN 978-0-7425-3408-7.
- The Elements of Bioethics. New York, NY: McGraw-Hill. 2007. ISBN 978-0-07-313277-8.
- How to Build a Better Human: An Ethical Blueprint. Lanham, MD: Rowman & Littlefield. 2012. ISBN 978-1-4422-1762-1.
- What We Talk About When We Talk About Clone Club: Bioethics and Philosophy in Orphan Black. Dallas, Texas: BenBella Books. 2016. ISBN 978-1-942952-34-3.
- Overcoming Addiction: Seven Imperfect Solutions and the End of America's Greatest Epidemic. Lanham, MD: Rowman & Littlefield. 2020. ISBN 978-1-5381-3503-7.
- Pandemic Bioethics. Peterborough, Ontario, Canada: Broadview Press. 2021. ISBN 978-1-55481-521-0.
- What Went Wrong: America's Response to Covid. Lanham, MD: Rowman & Littlefield. 2025. ISBN 978-1538199701.

He has co-authored one book with G. Lynn Stephens:

- —; Stephens, G. Lynn (1994). Seven Dilemmas in World Religions. New York, NY: Paragon House. ISBN 978-1-55778-702-6.

He has edited three books:

- Classic Works in Medical Ethics. New York, NY: McGraw-Hill. 1995. ISBN 978-0-07-038115-5.
- Flesh of My Flesh: The Ethics of Cloning Humans. Lanham, MD: Rowman & Littlefield. 1998. ISBN 978-0-8476-8981-1.
- The Ethics of Food: A Reader for the Twenty-First Century. Lanham, MD: Rowman & Littlefield. 2002. ISBN 978-0-7425-1333-4.

=== Op-Ed Essays ===
A few of Pence's op-ed essays:

- "Norman Borlaug: A Hero for Our Time". The Birmingham News. 23 July 2000 – via AgBioWorld.
- "Organ Donors May Risk Their Health". Los Angeles Times. 9 April 2002.
- "My Turn: Let's Think Outside the Box of Bad Cliches". Newsweek. 5 August 2007.
- "Free-Market Baby Making". Los Angeles Times. 24 July 2008.
- "End-of-Life Decisions are Heart-Wrenching". The Birmingham News. 15 November 2009.
- "Should We Test for Genetic Diseases that Cannot be Cured?". The Birmingham News. 9 January 2011.
- "Schizophrenia is Like Living with Your Brain On Fire". The Birmingham News. 29 January 2012.
- "Yes, You Can Teach Neuroethics in Prison". The Birmingham News. 10 October 2013.
- "UAB's Jim Pittman's Legacy is Rich, Memorable". The Birmingham News. 14 January 2014.
- "Surgical Firsts, Not Always Ethical". The Birmingham News. 27 November 2017.
- "Right to Try Bill Will Hurt Terminal Patients". The Birmingham News. 25 May 2018.
- "Bound Upon a Wheel of Fire". The Birmingham News. 24 May 2019.
- "The Long Haul of Long Covid". The Birmingham News. 27 July 2021.
- "UAB Bioethicist: Why Omicron Scares Me". The Birmingham News. 22 December 2021.

== See also ==
- American philosophy
- List of American philosophers
- Bioethics
