= Jan Boxill =

American academic

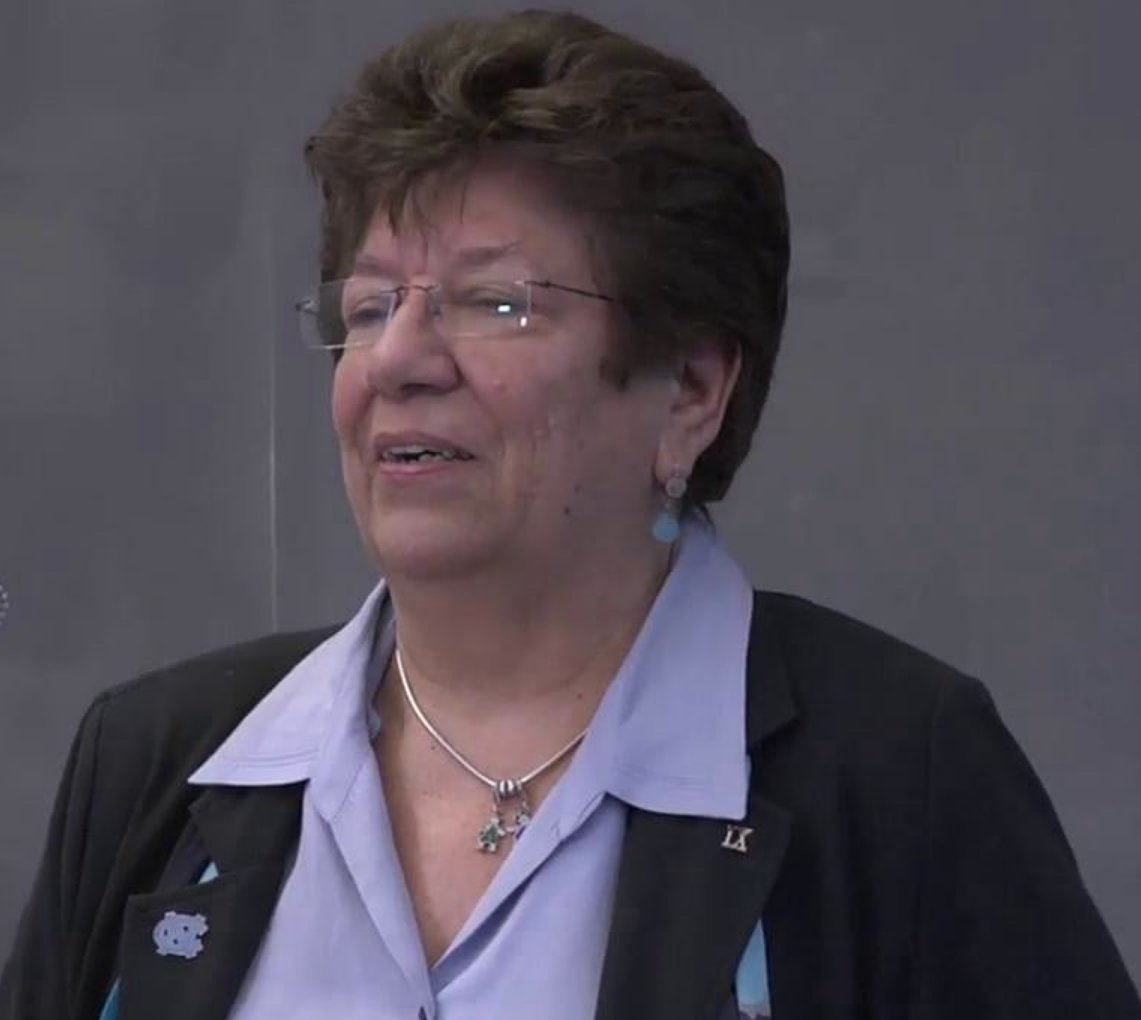
- Jan Boxill,2013.
- Born: Jeanette Marie Bozanic; 1939 (age 86–87); Worcester, New York

Education
- Education: UCLA

Philosophical work
- Era: Contemporary philosophy
- Region: philosophy of sport, Caribbean philosophy
- Main interests: Ethics, philosophy of sport, post-continental philosophy, feminism, constructivism

Jeanette Marie Boxill (née Bozanic) is an American academic who was Senior Lecturer in Philosophy (ethics) at the University of North Carolina at Chapel Hill. She was also Chair of the Faculty and Director of Parr Center for Ethics. Her writing and teaching relate broadly with ethical issues in social conduct, social and political philosophy, feminist theory, and ethics in sports. She is editor of Sports Ethics: An Anthology and Issues in Race and Gender. She is past president of the International Association for Philosophy in Sport, serves on the board of the NCAA Scholarly Colloquium Committee, and chairs both the 2011 NCAA Scholarly Colloquium and the Education Outreach Program for the U.S. Anti-Doping Agency (USADA). For 25 years, Boxill was the public address announcer for UNC women's basketball and field hockey. She is a member of numerous professional associations (philosophy, sports, and the American Association of University Women) and has won a number of awards (from inside her institution and beyond) for teaching and professional contributions. She resigned from UNC in 2015 in the wake of the UNC Chapel Hill academics-athletics scandal.

== Early life and education ==
Jan Boxill was born Jeanette Marie Bozanic c. 1939 in Worcester, New York. Her father John was an immigrant from Yugoslavia, and her mother Martha was an immigrant from Czechoslovakia.

After graduating from Worcester Central School in 1956, Bozanic joined the United States Air Force and played saxophone in the Women's Air Force Band. She then enrolled at the University of California, Los Angeles using the G.I. Bill and played club basketball while completing her Bachelor of Arts degree in political science. After completing her B.A. in 1967, she earned an M.A. in philosophy in 1975 followed by a Ph.D. in philosophy in 1981, both also at UCLA.

== Teaching career ==
- Instructor, California State University, Los Angeles, 1973–1979
- Assistant Professor, University of Tampa, 1981–1985
- Visiting Assistant Professor, University of North Carolina at Chapel Hill, 1985–1987
- Assistant Professor, Elon College, Elon, NC, 1987–1988
- Lecturer in Philosophy, University of North Carolina at Chapel Hill, 1988–2004
- Senior Lecturer in Philosophy, University of North Carolina at Chapel Hill, 2004–2014At UNC,

== Academic work ==
Her writing and teaching relate broadly with ethical issues in social conduct, social and political philosophy, feminist theory, and ethics in sports. She is editor of Sports Ethics: An Anthology and Issues in Race and Gender. She is past president of the International Association for Philosophy in Sport, serves on the board of the NCAA Scholarly Colloquium Committee, and chairs both the 2011 NCAA Scholarly Colloquium and the Education Outreach Program for the U.S. Anti-Doping Agency (USADA). For 25 years, Boxill was the public address announcer for UNC women's basketball and field hockey.

At UNC, she was Senior Lecturer in Philosophy (ethics) and also Chair of the Faculty and Director of Parr Center for Ethics.

She is a member of numerous professional associations (philosophy, sports, and the American Association of University Women) and has won a number of awards (from inside her institution and beyond) for teaching and professional contributions. She resigned from UNC in 2015 in the wake of the UNC Chapel Hill academics-athletics scandal.

== UNC academics-athletics scandal ==
From 1991 to 2011, Boxill was an academic advisor for the North Carolina Tar Heels women's basketball team at UNC Chapel Hill.

Boxill resigned from her employment at UNC in February 2015, after it was alleged that she had steered athletes toward 'scam courses' in order to qualify for the school's sports teams. Boxill, who had been the faculty chair, a senior lecturer in ethics, and an academic counselor for athletes had been told on October 22, 2014, that her employment with the university would be terminated, but she had been appealing that institutional decision. Then, she announced her resignation on February 28, 2015. Systematic investigation of the 20-year-long 'incident' was published in The Wainstein Report The NCAA initially accused her of giving impermissible academic assistance and special arrangements to women's basketball players. Three months later, after reviewing the record and hearing her explanations at a hearing, the NCAA cleared her.

== Personal life ==
While at UCLA, she married Bernard Boxill, who also teaches philosophy as the Pardue Distinguished Professor of Philosophy at UNC and focuses upon social and political philosophy and African American philosophy.

== Publications ==
Books

- Boxill, J. (Ed.). Sports Ethics: An Anthology. December 2002, Wiley-Blackwell. ISBN 978-0-631-21696-4, 376 pages
- Boxill, J. Issues in Race and Gender, edited anthology, Kendall-Hunt Publishers, 2000.

Articles

- Boxill, J. "Ethics and Making Ethical Decisions," Chapter for Introduction to Sports Management, edited by Richard Southall, Kendall-Hunt Publishers, Spring 2010.
- Boxill, J. "Football and Feminism," Journal of the Philosophy of Sport, Spring 2006.
- Boxill, J. "The Moral Significance of Sport," Introduction, Sports Ethics. 2003, pp. 1–14
- Boxill, J. "The Ethics of Competition," Sports Ethics, pp. 107–114.
- Boxill, J. "Title IX and Gender Equity," reprinted in Sports Ethics, pp. 254–261. Reprinted in, Issues in Gender and Race.
- Boxill, J. "Affirmative Action Revisited," co-authored with Bernard Boxill, in A Companion to Applied Ethics, edited by R. G. Frey and Christopher Heath Wellman, Blackwell Publishers, Fall, 2002, pp. 118–127. Reprinted in 2005 and 2008. ISBN 978-1405133456, ISBN 1405133457
- Boxill, J. "Affirmative Action as Reverse Discrimination," Issues in Race and Gender, 2000, pp. 127–131
- Boxill, J. "Title IX and Gender Equity," Issues in Race and Gender, 2000, pp. 166–173.
- Boxill, J. "Sport as a Forum for Public Ethics," Sports and Society, Telecourse integrating Sports and the Humanities, January 1999.
- Boxill, J. "The Dunk and Women's Basketball," Women's Basketball Coaches Journal, March 1995.
- Boxill, J. "Gender Equity and Title IX," Journal of the Philosophy of Sport, Vol. XX-XXI,1995.
- Boxill, J. "Beauty, Gender and Sport," Journal of Philosophy of Sport, 1985. Reprinted in Philosophic Inquiry in Sport, edited by William J. Moran and Klaus V. Meier, Human Kinetics Publishers, 1987. ISBN 0873227166; ISBN 978-0873227162.

Work in progress

- Boxill, J. Front Porch Ethics, manuscript on ethics in sports.
- Boxill, J. "True Sport Report," US Anti-Doping Agency Education Outreach Program.
- Boxill, J. "Review of: The Game of Life, by James Shulman and William Bowen, and Reclaiming the Game, by William Bower and Sarah Levin," Ethics

== Honors and awards ==
- Award of Excellence, presented by the Governor's Council on Physical Fitness and Health for outstanding achievement and commitment to women's sports in North Carolina, 1994.
- UNC Learning Disabilities Services Access Award for supporting and encouraging the potential of LD students at UNC-CH, 1995 Frank Porter Graham Graduate and Professional Student Honor Society, Inductee, 2009.
- Tanner Faculty Award for Excellence in Undergraduate Teaching, University of North Carolina, Spring 1998
- Parr Ethics Fellow, Ethics Fellowship at the Institute for the Arts and Humanities, Fall 2Women's Advocacy Award, presented by the Carolina Women's Center, 2005.
- President, International Association of the Philosophy of Sport, Elected office, 2002–2005.
- Excellence in Advising Award, University of North Carolina, 2003.
- Mary Turner Lane Award, presented by the Association of Women Faculty and Professionals, 2007

== Professional associations ==
- American Philosophical Association
- Association for Practical and Professional Ethics
- Caribbean Philosophical Association
- Phi Sigma Tau, International Honor Society for Philosophy
- International Association of the Philosophy of Sport
- Program for the Study of Sport in the American South
- Women's Basketball Coaches Association
- American Association of University Women

== See also ==
- Kenneth L. Wainstein
- Sara Ganim
- Wainstein Report
