= Brenda Almond =

British philosopher (1937–2023)

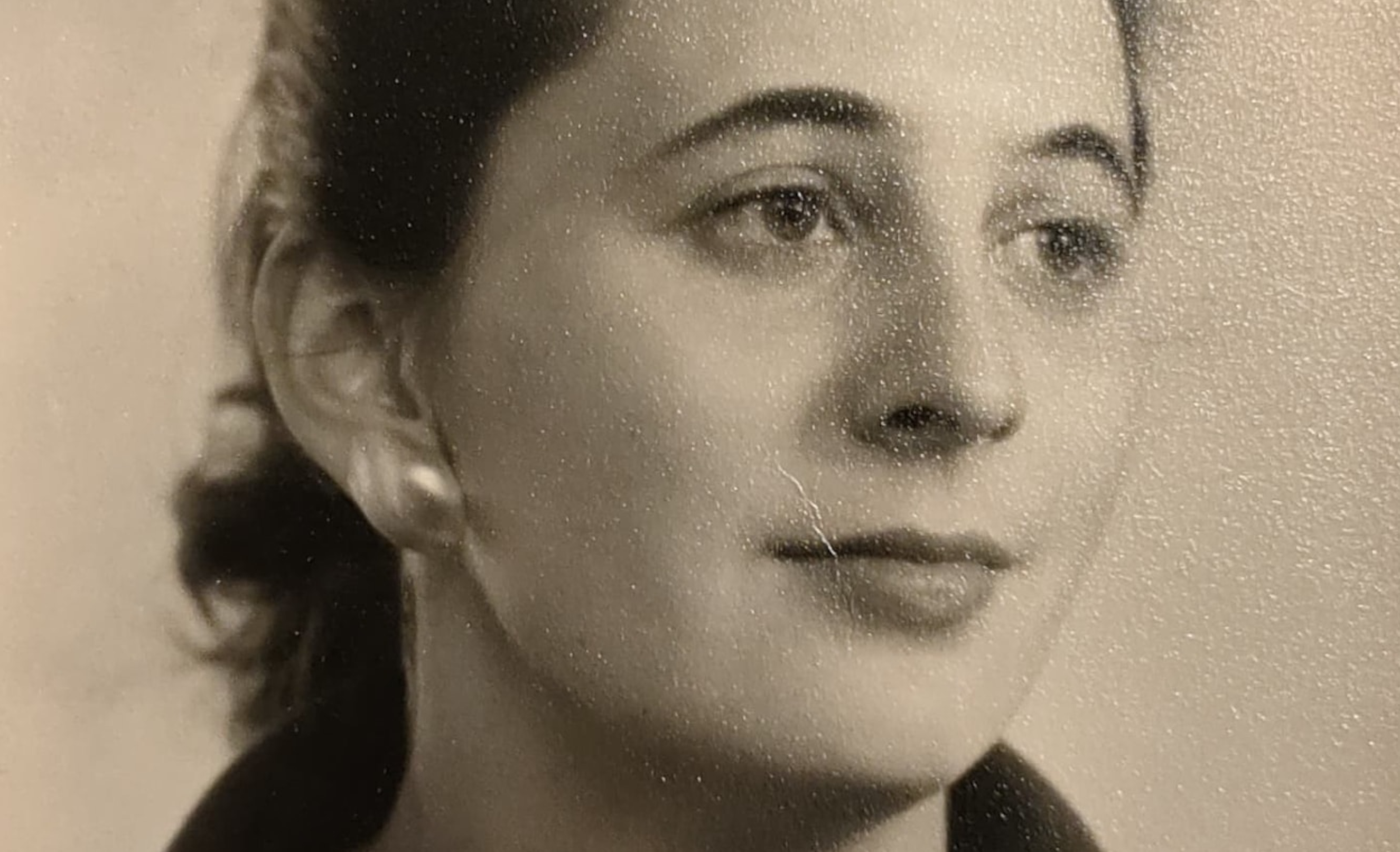
- Born: Brenda Margaret Almond; 19 September 1937; Birkenhead, Cheshire, England
- Died: 14 January 2023 (aged 85); Sussex, England
- Awards: Honorary D. Phil (1998), Utrecht University

Education
- Education: University College London

Philosophical work
- Era: Contemporary philosophy
- Region: Western philosophy
- School: Moral philosophy
- Main interests: Moral philosophy, Philosophy of education, bioethics, Applied philosophy
- Notable works: Education and the Individual (1981), Moral Concerns (1987), The Philosophical Quest (1990), Exploring Ethics: A Traveller's Tale (1998)
- Notable ideas: Philosophy as a guide to practical public policy; liberalism and philosophy of education

Brenda Margaret Almond (19 September 1937 – 14 January 2023) was a British philosopher, known for her work on philosophy of education and applied ethics. She was an elected member of the Austrian Academy of Sciences.

== Biography ==
Almond co-founded the Society for Applied Philosophy in 1982 with her then colleague at Surrey University Anthony O'Hear and co-founded the International Journal of Applied Philosophy in 1983, part of a deliberate strategy of moving philosophy away from abstract and abstruse debates towards issues that affect people in their everyday lives. Almond’s writing highlights issues like health and family and social relations. In 1987, at a time when HIV/AIDS was still barely understood, she wrote in The Times on the difficult balance of health and safety over risk and freedom. “What is clear”, she wrote, “is that in the absence of a vaccine or cure, the virus will increasingly move towards the centre of the world stage”. Almond went on to write a book setting out key debates in the area called AIDS: A Moral Issue (MacMillan) in 1990. Among the topics discussed here are confidentiality, autonomy and welfare, the role of the media, legal implications of infection in Britain and the US, coping with the threat of death, along with some theological reflections.

Almond also organised and reported on academic conferences on the issue, including one held at Surrey University in 1986 focussing on medical confidentiality and discrimination and the Third International Conference on AIDS in Washington in 1987.

In later years, Almond moved on to issues such as biotechnologies and even debates about who and what constituted a “legitimate target” during a war. In an opinion piece for the magazine Philosophy Now she accused fellow philosophers of still preferring to “stick to tired and familiar academic debates while the world burns”.

Almond was later a professor emeritus at Hull University.

Almond argued that ultimately the freedom to opt out of the education system altogether must be protected, as well as the freedom to choose a religious education in a secular state, or a secular education in a religious state, in Education and the Individual (written when she was in her thirties, under her married name), and went on to write Moral Concerns, The Philosophical Quest, Exploring Ethics: A Traveller's Tale and The Fragmenting Family. As part of a personal profile of Almond, the Times Higher Education Supplement says that "she argues that the family is about more than stability in the present: it is about the past and the future" and notes that the book emphasises G. K. Chesterton's description of the family as "this frail cord, flung from the forgotten hills of yesterday to the invisible mountains of tomorrow".

As well as being a philosophy professor, Almond sought to present her particular view of individual rights to a wider public. She argued regularly for maintenance of the “welfare of the child provision” when legislation was crafted to reflect the changing technologies of birth and raised ethical issues surrounding the use of human embryos.

Ailsa Stevens wrote in an article in BioNews that Almond "felt that anxieties over hybrid embryo research had been fuelled by confusion over the definition of an embryo".

Almond died in Sussex on 14 January 2023, at the age of 85. In an appreciation published by The Guardian, her son Martin Cohen noted that her "authentic voice" was to be found in her best-known title, The Philosophical Quest (1990), a mix of conventional, essentially educational, summaries of the core themes of philosophy, alongside more fluid, creative passages in which the narrator records receiving philosophical letters from a mysterious correspondent called Sophia, even as her later writing centred on defence of the "traditional family" from both social and technological changes.

== Selected publications ==
- Cohen, Brenda (1969). Educational Thought: an Introduction. MacMillan. OCLC 1253354597.
- Almond, Brenda (2020). Education and the Individual. [S.l.]: Routledge. ISBN 978-1-000-28728-8. OCLC 1253354597.
- Almond, Brenda (1987). Moral Concerns. Atlantic Highlands, NJ: Humanities Press International. ISBN 0-391-03372-7. OCLC 12908784.
- Almond, Brenda (1995). Introducing Applied Ethics. Oxford UK: Blackwell. ISBN 978-0631193913.
- Almond, Brenda (1996). Exploring philosophy: the Philosophical Quest. Brenda Almond (2nd ed.). Oxford, UK: Blackwell. ISBN 0-631-19485-1. OCLC 30892338.
- Almond, Brenda (1998). Exploring Ethics : A Traveller's Tale. Oxford: Blackwell Publishers. ISBN 0-631-19952-7. OCLC 37559734.
- Almond, Brenda (2006). The Fragmenting Family. Oxford: Clarendon Press. ISBN 978-1-4294-6006-4. OCLC 86074077.

== Awards and honors ==
She was awarded an Honorary doctorate by the University of Utrecht in 1998. In 1999 she was named an elected member of the Austrian Academy of Sciences.
