= Anthony O'Hear =

British philosopher

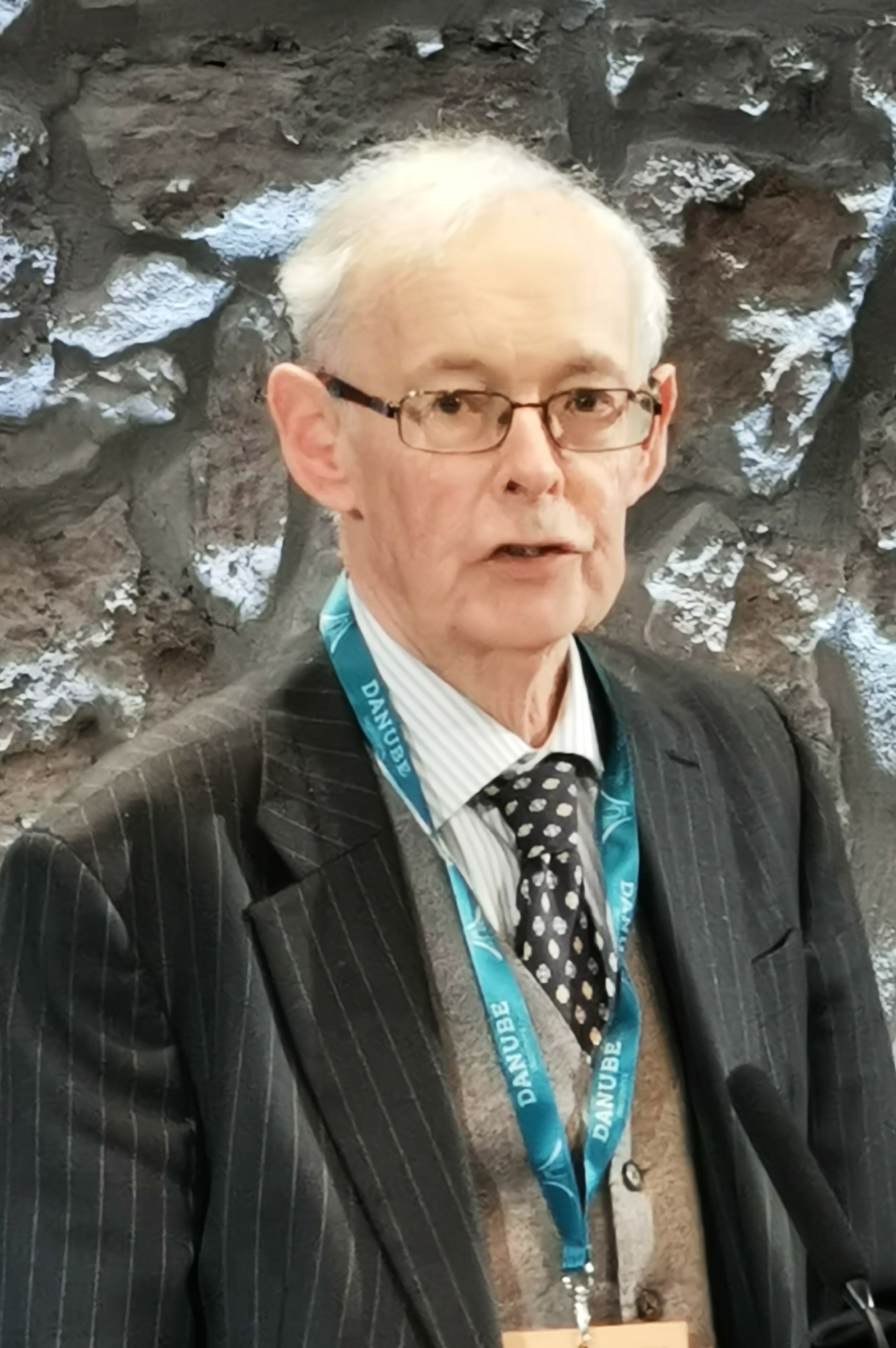
In 2025

Anthony O'Hear OBE (born 1942 in Cleethorpes) is a British philosopher. He is Professor of Philosophy at the University of Buckingham and Head of the Department of Education.

He held the role of Honorary Director of the Royal Institute of Philosophy and editor of its journal Philosophy until 2019 and co-founder of the Journal of Applied Philosophy with Brenda Almond. He is also editor emeritus of The Fortnightly Review's new series.

O'Hear was a Government special adviser on education for approximately ten years. He was especially influential during the time of Margaret Thatcher and John Major as Prime Minister when he was teaching at Bradford University. He continues to be active in conservative circles, especially in advocating social conservatism. His relationship with New Labour was more troubled. Tony Blair- who was himself criticised for having "exploited (her) death for political ends... gushing about the People's Princess, standing at the airport to receive her coffin as if he were the Head of State"- dismissed O'Hear as an "old-fashioned snob" for his views on Diana, Princess of Wales (views which obtained substantial media coverage). A. N. Wilson wrote in support of O'Hear's view: "When Professor Anthony O'Hear claimed that Diana represented "fake Britain", many a bosom will have returned an echo. His claim that she stood for "the evaluation of feeling, image and spontaneity over reason, reality and restraint" might have been ignored, had not its sour tone been almost justified by the response of the Prime Minister." O'Hear has, however, endorsed the cultural policies of the Attlee government.

== Bibliography ==
His publications include:

- Karl Popper (1980)
- What Philosophy Is (1985)
- The Element of Fire (1989)
- An Introduction to the Philosophy of Science (1990)
- Beyond Evolution (1997)
- After Progress (1999)
- Introducing Christianity (2000)
- Philosophy in the New Century (2001)
- Plato's Children (2006)
- The Great Books: From The Iliad and The Odyssey to Goethe's Faust: A journey through 2,500 years of the West's classic literature (2007)
- Transcendence, Creation and Incarnation: From Philosophy to Religion (Transcending Boundaries in Philosophy and Theology) (2020)
