= List of Phi Sigma Tau chapters =

Phi Sigma Tau is an international honor society for philosophers. In the following list, active chapters are indicated in bold and inactive chapters are in italics.

Chapter	Charter date and range	Institution	Location	Status	Ref.
**Pennsylvania Alpha**	1930	Muhlenberg College	Allentown, Pennsylvania	Active	(Note: This chapter was formed and operated as Alpha Kappa Alpha, until the society's name was changed Phi Sigma Tau in 1955.)
Pennsylvania Beta (see Pennsylvania Eta Second)	1930	Moravian College for Men	Bethlehem, Pennsylvania	Reestablished	
Pennsylvania Gamma	1931	Gettysburg College	Gettysburg, Pennsylvania	Inactive	
Pennsylvania Delta (First)	1932	Cedar Crest College	Allentown, Pennsylvania	Inactive, Reassigned	
Pennsylvania Epsilon	1938	Beaver College	Glenside, Pennsylvania	Inactive	
**Pennsylvania Zeta**	1941	Washington & Jefferson College	Washington, Pennsylvania	Active	
Pennsylvania Eta (First)	1949	Lincoln University	Oxford, Pennsylvania	Inactive, Reassigned	
Maryland Alpha (First) (see **Maryland Gamma**)	1949	Western Maryland College	Westminster, Maryland	Reestablished, Reassigned	
Ohio Alpha (see **Ohio Sigma**)	1955	Baldwin Wallace University	Berea, Ohio	Active	
**Texas Alpha**	1955	Baylor University	Waco, Texas	Active	
Pennsylvania Alpha (see **Pennsylvania Xi**)	1955	Bucknell University	Lewisburg, Pennsylvania	Reestablished	
**Mississippi Alpha**	1955–xxxx ?; 2010	University of Mississippi	Oxford, Mississippi	Active	
**Maryland Alpha**	1955	Morgan State University	Baltimore, Maryland	Active	
**New Mexico Alpha**	1955	University of New Mexico	Albuquerque, New Mexico	Active	
**California Alpha**	1955–19xx ?; 2003	University of the Pacific	Stockton, California	Active	
**New York Alpha**	1955	St. Lawrence University	Canton, New York	Active	
Kansas Alpha	1955	Wichita State University	Wichita, Kansas	Inactive	
District of Columbia Alpha (First)	1955	Howard University	Washington, D.C.	Inactive, Reassigned	
Iowa Alpha	1955	Drake University	Des Moines, Iowa	Inactive	
**Illinois Alpha**	1956–19xx ?; 2003	Loyola University Chicago	Chicago, Illinois	Active	
Michigan Alpha	1960	University of Detroit Mercy	Detroit, Michigan	Inactive	
**Wisconsin Alpha**	1961	Marquette University	Milwaukee, Wisconsin	Active	
Ohio Alpha	1962	University of Akron	Akron, Ohio	Inactive	
Nebraska Alpha	1962	University of Nebraska–Lincoln	Lincoln, Nebraska	Inactive	
California Beta	1962	San Jose State University	San Jose, California	Inactive	
**Illinois Beta**	1962	Wheaton College	Wheaton, Illinois	Active	
**California Gamma**	1963	California State University, Chico	Chico, California	Active	
**Massachusetts Alpha**	1963	Clark University	Worcester, Massachusetts	Active	
Florida Alpha	1963	Florida State University	Tallahassee, Florida	Inactive	
**Rhode Island Alpha**	1963	Providence College	Providence, Rhode Island	Active	
Texas Beta	1963	Texas Christian University	Fort Worth, Texas	Inactive	
**Kentucky Alpha**	1964–19xx ?; 1999	Bellarmine University	Louisville, Kentucky	Active	
California Delta	1964	California State University, Long Beach	Long Beach, California	Inactive	
California Epsilon	1965	University of Southern California	Los Angeles, California	Inactive	
**North Carolina Alpha**	1965	East Carolina University	Greenville, North Carolina	Active	
**Massachusetts Beta**	1965	Suffolk University	Boston, Massachusetts	Active	
Ohio Beta	1966	Muskingum University	New Concord, Ohio	Inactive	
Kentucky Beta	1967	Centre College	Danville, Kentucky	Inactive	
**Missouri Alpha**	1967–19xx ?; 2007	Lindenwood University	St. Charles, Missouri	Active	
Illinois Gamma	1967	North Park University	Chicago, Illinois	Inactive	
California Zeta	1967	Whittier College	Whittier, California	Inactive	
**Tennessee Beta**	1968	Carson–Newman University	Jefferson City, Tennessee	Active	
Ohio Gamma (see **Ohio Epsilon**)	1968	University of Dayton	Dayton, Ohio	Reestablished	
**Florida Beta**	1968	Florida Atlantic University	Boca Raton, Florida	Active	
**Illinois Delta**	1968	Lewis University	Romeoville, Illinois	Active	
Tennessee Alpha	1968	Milligan University	Milligan College, Tennessee	Inactive	
**Missouri Beta**	1968	Rockhurst University	Kansas City, Missouri	Active	
Iowa Beta	1969	Loras College	Dubuque, Iowa	Inactive	
**Pennsylvania Lambda**	1969	Westminster College	New Wilmington, Pennsylvania	Active	
**Nebraska Beta**	1971	Creighton University	Omaha, Nebraska	Active	
Ohio Delta	1971	Wittenberg University	Springfield, Ohio	Inactive	
**Ohio Epsilon** (see Ohio Gamma)	1971	University of Dayton	Dayton, Ohio	Active	
**Indiana Alpha**	1972–xxxx ?; 2015	Indiana University Indianapolis	Indianapolis, Indiana	Active	(Note: Chapter formed at Indiana University–Purdue University Indianapolis, which separated into two different universities. The chapter stayed with Indiana University Indianapolis.)
**South Carolina Alpha**	1972	Winthrop University	Rock Hill, South Carolina	Active	
**Connecticut Alpha**	1973	Fairfield University	Fairfield, Connecticut	Active	
**Georgia Alpha**	1973	University of Georgia	Athens, Georgia	Active	
Illinois Epsilon	1973	Northern Illinois University	DeKalb, Illinois	Inactive	
California Eta	1973	Olivet University	Anza, California	Inactive	
**California Theta**	1973–19xx ?; 1997	University of San Diego	San Diego, California	Active	
Louisiana Alpha	1973	Tulane University	New Orleans, Louisiana	Inactive	
**Pennsylvania Mu**	1973	Villanova University	Villanova, Pennsylvania	Active	
Wisconsin Beta	1973	University of Wisconsin–Whitewater	Whitewater, Wisconsin	Inactive	
New York Beta (First)	1974	Long Island University	Brooklyn, New York City, New York	Inactive, Reassigned	
**California Iota**	1974	Westmont College	Montecito, California	Active	
Missouri Gamma	1974	William Jewell College	Liberty, Missouri	Inactive	
**Maryland Gamma**	1974	McDaniel College	Westminster, Maryland	Active	
Vermont Alpha	1975	Saint Michael's College	Colchester, Vermont	Inactive	
**Virginia Alpha**	1976	Christopher Newport University	Newport News, Virginia	Active	
New Jersey Alpha	1976	Monmouth University	West Long Branch, New Jersey	Inactive	
**New York Gamma**	1976	State University of New York at Oneonta	Oneonta, New York	Active	
**Alabama Alpha**	1976–xxxx ?; 2005	Spring Hill College	Mobile, Alabama	Active	
Pennsylvania Nu (First)	1976	Saint Joseph's University	Philadelphia, Pennsylvania	Inactive, Reassigned	
**Wisconsin Gamma**	1976	University of Wisconsin–Parkside	Kenosha, Wisconsin	Active	
Pennsylvania Xi (Frist)	1977	Wilkes University	Wilkes-Barre, Pennsylvania	Inactive, Reassigned	
Ohio Zeta	1978	Central State University	Wilberforce, Ohio	Inactive	
Pennsylvania Omicron (First)	1978	La Salle University	Philadelphia, Pennsylvania	Inactive, Reassigned	
Connecticut Beta (First)	1978	Sacred Heart University	Fairfield, Connecticut	Inactive, Reassigned	
**Georgia Gamma**	1979	Agnes Scott College	Decatur, Georgia	Active	
Michigan Beta	1979	Albion College	Albion, Michigan	Inactive	
North Carolina Beta	1979	Belmont Abbey College	Belmont, North Carolina	Inactive	
**Sourh Carolina Beta**	1979	Coastal Carolina University	Conway, South Carolina	Active	
**Georgia Beta**	1979	Emory University	Atlanta, Georgia	Active	
**Massachusetts Gamma**	1979	College of the Holy Cross	Worcester, Massachusetts	Active	
**Pennsylvania Pi**	1979	King's College	Wilkes-Barre, Pennsylvania	Active	
**New York Epsilon**	1979	Molloy University	Rockville Centre, New York	Active	
**New Jersey Delta**	1979	Rider University	Lawrence Township, New Jersey	Active	
**New York Delta**	1979	Stony Brook University	Stony Brook, New York	Active	
Michigan Gamma	1979	Siena Heights University	Adrian, Michigan	Inactive	
Indiana Beta	1979	Saint Mary-of-the-Woods College	Saint Mary-of-the-Woods, Indiana	Inactive	
**Virginia Beta**	1979–xxxx ?; 2010	Virginia Tech	Blacksburg, Virginia	Active	
**Maryland Delta**	1979	Washington College	Chestertown, Maryland	Active	
**Pennsylvania Rho**	1979	West Chester University	West Chester, Pennsylvania	Active	
Wisconsin Delta	1979	University of Wisconsin–La Crosse	La Crosse, Wisconsin	Inactive	
**Kansas Beta**	1980	Baker University	Baldwin City, Kansas	Active	
**Illinois Zeta**	1980–xxxx ?; 2004	University of Illinois Urbana-Champaign	Urbana, Illinois	Active	
**Pennsylvania Sigma**	1980	Lycoming College	Williamsport, Pennsylvania	Active	
Michigan Delta	1980	Mercy College of Detroit	Detroit, Michigan	Inactive	
**New Jersey Epsilon**	1980	Saint Peter's University	Jersey City, New Jersey	Active	
**Missouri Delta**	1980	Westminster College	Fulton, Missouri	Active	
**Texas Gamma**	1980	Sam Houston State University	Huntsville, Texas	Active	
Illinois Eta	1981	Lake Forest College	Lake Forest, Illinois	Inactive	
**Virginia Gamma**	1981	James Madison University	Harrisonburg, Virginia	Active	
**Georgia Delta**	1981–xxxx ?; 2016	Mercer University	Macon, Georgia	Active	
**Maryland Epsilon**	1981	Mount St. Mary's University	Emmitsburg, Maryland	Active	
**Massachusetts Delta**	1982	Boston College	Chestnut Hill, Massachusetts	Active	
New York Zeta (First) (see **New York Alpha Alpha**)	1982	Iona University	New Rochelle, New York	Reassigned, Reestablished	
**New York Eta**	1982	Le Moyne College	DeWitt, New York	Active	
Illinois Theta	1982	Mundelein College	Chicago, Illinois	Inactive	
**Virginia Delta**	1982	University of Richmond	Richmond, Virginia	Active	
**Pennsylvania Tau**	1982	University of Scranton	Scranton, Pennsylvania	Active	
**Texas Delta**	1982	Texas State University	San Marcos, Texas	Active	
Kentucky Gamma	1983	Asbury University	Wilmore, Kentucky	Inactive	
Virginia Epsilon	1983	George Mason University	Fairfax, Virginia	Inactive	
**Maryland Zeta**	1983	Salisbury University	Salisbury, Maryland	Active	
**Ohio Theta**	1983	College of Wooster	Wooster, Ohio	Active	
**New York Iota**	1984	LIU Post	Brookville, New York	Active	
**Pennsylvania Upsilon**	1984	Slippery Rock University	Slippery Rock, Pennsylvania	Active	
**District of Columbia Beta**	1985	Catholic University of America	Washington, D.C.	Active	
**Texas Epsilon**	1985	University of St. Thomas	Houston, Texas	Active	
**California Kappa**	1986	Santa Clara University	Santa Clara, California	Active	
**Missouri Epsilon**	1986	Evangel University	Springfield, Missouri	Active	
**Pennsylvania Phi**	1986	Gannon University	Erie, Pennsylvania	Active	
**California Lambda**	1987	Loyola Marymount University	Los Angeles, California	Active	
**Pennsylvania Chi**	1987	University of Pittsburgh	Pittsburgh, Pennsylvania	Active	
**Virginia Zeta**	1987	Liberty University	Lynchburg, Virginia	Active	
**Florida Delta**	1988	University of Miami	Coral Gables, Florida	Active	
**Maryland Iota**	1988	Loyola University Maryland	Baltimore, Maryland	Active	
**New York Kappa**	1989	Siena College	Loudonville, New York	Active	
**Indiana Gamma**	1990	Franklin College	Franklin, Indiana	Active	
**New York Lambda**	1990	State University of New York at Potsdam	Potsdam, New York	Active	
**Oregon Alpha**	1990	Linfield University	McMinnville, Oregon	Active	
**Alabama Beta**	1991	Auburn University	Auburn, Alabama	Active	
**Florida Eta**	1991	Florida International University	University Park, Florida	Active	
**New York Nu**	1991	Fordham University	New York City, New York	Active	
**Illinois Lambda**	1992	Southern Illinois University Carbondale	Carbondale, Illinois	Active	
**Indiana Delta**	1993	Valparaiso University	Valparaiso, Indiana	Active	
**New York Xi**	1993	State University of New York at Geneseo	Geneseo, New York	Active	
**Ohio Iota**	1993	Ohio Northern University	Ada, Ohio	Active	
**Alabama Gamma**	1994	University of Alabama	Tuscaloosa, Alabama	Active	
**New York Omicron**	1994	Hofstra University	Hempstead, New York	Active	
**North Carolina Gamma**	1994	University of North Carolina at Charlotte	Charlotte, North Carolina	Active	
**Tennessee Gamma**	1994	Belmont University	Nashville, Tennessee	Active	
**Illinois Mu**	1995	Dominican University	River Forest, Illinois	Active	
**Montana Alpha**	1995	Carroll College	Helena, Montana	Active	
**Ohio Kappa**	1995	Ohio Wesleyan University	Delaware, Ohio	Active	
**California Nu**	1996	Pepperdine University	Los Angeles County, California	Active	
**Indiana Epsilon**	1996	Ball State University	Muncie, Indiana	Active	
**Iowa Gamma**	1996	Iowa State University	Ames, Iowa	Active	
**Utah Alpha**	1996	Westminster University	Salt Lake City, Utah	Active	
**Virginia Eta**	1996	Old Dominion University	Norfolk, Virginia	Active	
**Washington Alpha**	1996	Central Washington University	Ellensburg, Washington	Active	
**Illinois Xi**	1997	Elmhurst University	Elmhurst, Illinois	Active	
**North Carolina Delta**	1997	Wingate University	Wingate, North Carolina	Active	
**Texas Lambda**	1997	St. Mary's University, Texas	San Antonio, Texas	Active	
**Virginia Theta**	1997	Hollins University	Hollins, Virginia	Active	
**Georgia Epsilon**	1998	Spelman College	Atlanta, Georgia	Active	
**Georgia Zeta**	1998	Georgia State University	Atlanta, Georgia	Active	
**North Carolina Epsilon**	1998	University of North Carolina at Asheville	Asheville, North Carolina	Active	
**North Carolina Zeta**	1998	University of North Carolina at Greensboro	Greensboro, North Carolina	Active	
**Pennsylvania Psi**	1998	University of Pennsylvania	Philadelphia, Pennsylvania	Active	
**Washington Beta**	1998	Gonzaga University	Spokane, Washington	Active	
**Missouri Kappa**	1999	Washington University in St. Louis	St. Louis, Missouri	Active	
**Ohio Mu**	1999	Ashland University	Ashland, Ohio	Active	
**Florida Theta**	2000	Florida Southern College	Lakeland, Florida	Active	
**Michigan Kappa**	2000	Hillsdale College	Hillsdale, Michigan	Active	
**New Jersey Zeta**	2000	Stockton University	Galloway Township, New Jersey	Active	
**Pennsylvania Theta**	2000	Grove City College	Grove City, Pennsylvania	Active	
**Pennsylvania Kappa**	2000	Misericordia University	Dallas, Pennsylvania	Active	
**Florida Iota**	2001	Jacksonville University	Jacksonville, Florida	Active	
**Georgia Eta**	2001	Georgia Southern University	Statesboro, Georgia	Active	
**Kentucky Epsilon**	2001	University of Louisville	Louisville, Kentucky	Active	
**New York Pi**	2001	Manhattan University	Bronx, New York City, New York	Active	
**Ohio Nu**	2001	Youngstown State University	Youngstown, Ohio	Active	
**Pennsylvania Iota**	2001	Allegheny College	Meadville, Pennsylvania	Active	
**Pennsylvania Nu**	2001	Saint Joseph's University	Philadelphia, Pennsylvania	Active	
**Texas Mu**	2001	University of Texas at Arlington	Arlington, Texas	Active	
**Alabama Delta**	2002	Samford University	Homewood, Alabama	Active	
**Arkansas Alpha**	2002	Lyon College	Batesville, Arkansas	Active	
**California Xi**	2002	California State University, Dominguez Hills	Carson, California	Active	
**District of Columbia Alpha**	2002	George Washington University	Washington, D.C.	Active	
**Nevada Alpha**	2002	University of Nevada, Las Vegas	Paradise, Nevada	Active	
**New York Rho**	2002	St. John's University	New York City, New York	Active	
**New York Sigma**	2002	Canisius University	Buffalo, New York	Active	
**North Carolina Eta**	2002	University of North Carolina at Chapel Hill	Chapel Hill, North Carolina	Active	
**Utah Beta**	2002	Utah Valley University	Orem, Utah	Active	
**Arkansas Beta**	2003	University of Arkansas at Little Rock	Little Rock, Arkansas	Active	
**Georgia Theta**	2003	Valdosta State University	Valdosta, Georgia	Active	
**Louisiana Beta**	2003	Loyola University New Orleans	New Orleans, Louisiana	Active	
**Louisiana Gamma**	2003	Xavier University of Louisiana	New Orleans, Louisiana	Active	
**Maine Beta**	2003	University of Maine	Orono, Maine	Active	
**Massachusetts Eta**	2003	Bridgewater State University	Bridgewater, Massachusetts	Active	
**Missouri Mu**	2003	University of Missouri	Columbia, Missouri	Active	
**New Jersey Eta**	2003	Seton Hall University	South Orange, New Jersey	Active	
**New York Tau**	2003	Hartwick College	Oneonta, New York	Active	
**California Omicron**	2004	California State Polytechnic University, Pomona	Pomona, California	Active	
**Georgia Iota**	2004	University of West Georgia	Carrollton, Georgia	Active	
**Massachusetts Theta**	2004	Merrimack College	North Andover, Massachusetts	Active	
**Massachusetts Iota**	2004	Assumption University	Worcester, Massachusetts	Active	
**Mississippi Beta**	2004	Millsaps College	Jackson, Mississippi	Active	
**New York Upsilon**	2004	Hunter College	New York City, New York	Active	
**New York Phi**	2004	St. Francis College	Brooklyn, New York	Active	
**New York Chi**	2004	Lehman College	Bronx, New York	Active	
**Oklahoma Alpha**	2004	Oklahoma State University	Stillwater, Oklahoma	Active	
**Oregon Beta**	2004	University of Portland	Portland, Oregon	Active	
**Virginia Iota**	2004	Roanoke College	Salem, Virginia	Active	
**Florida Kappa**	2005	Barry University	Miami Shores, Florida	Active	
**Florida Lambda**	2005	University of West Florida	Pensacola, Florida	Active	
**Illinois Omicron**	2005	Illinois Wesleyan University	Bloomington, Illinois	Active	
**Iowa Epsilon**	2005	Central College	Pella, Iowa	Active	
**North Dakota Beta**	2005	Tri-College University	Fargo, North Dakota	Active	(Note: Tri-College University was a partnership between Concordia College, Minnesota State University Moorhead, and North Dakota State University that operated from 1970 to 2024.)
**Missouri Nu**	2005	University of Missouri–Kansas City	Kansas City, Missouri	Active	
**North Dakota Alpha**	2005	University of North Dakota	Grand Forks, North Dakota	Active	
**Oklahoma Beta**	2005	University of Tulsa	Tulsa, Oklahoma	Active	
**Wisconsin Zeta**	2005	University of Wisconsin–Stevens Point	Stevens Point, Wisconsin	Active	
**Arkansas Gamma**	2006	University of Central Arkansas	Conway, Arkansas	Active	
**Illinois Pi**	2006	Southern Illinois University Edwardsville	Edwardsville, Illinois	Active	
**Missouri Iota**	2006	Conception Seminary College	Conception, Missouri	Active	
**New Jersey Theta**	2006	Rutgers University–New Brunswick	New Brunswick, New Jersey	Active	
**Pennsylvania Delta**	2006	Duquesne University	Pittsburgh, Pennsylvania	Active	
**Utah Gamma**	2006	Utah State University	Logan, Utah	Active	
**Kentucky Zeta**	2007	Northern Kentucky University	Highland Heights, Kentucky	Active	
**Massachusetts Kappa**	2007	University of Massachusetts Dartmouth	Dartmouth, Massachusetts	Active	
**Montana Beta**	2007	Montana State University	Bozeman, Montana	Active	
**New Hampshire Alpha**	2007	New England College	Henniker, New Hampshire	Active	
**New York Omega**	2007	Niagara University	Lewiston, New York	Active	
**North Carolina Theta**	2007	Elon University	Elon, North Carolina	Active	
**Texas Nu**	2007	University of Houston	Houston, Texas	Active	
**California Pi**	2008	Chapman University	Orange, California	Active	
**Illinois Rho**	2008	Benedictine University	Lisle, Illinois	Active	
**Ohio Pi**	2008	Case Western Reserve University	Cleveland, Ohio	Active	
**Ohio Rho**	2008	John Carroll University	University Heights, Ohio	Active	
**Pennsylvania Eta** (see Pennsylvania Beta)	2008	Moravian University	Bethlehem, Pennsylvania	Active	
**Maryland Theta**	2009	Notre Dame of Maryland University	Baltimore, Maryland	Active	
**Florida Mu**	2010	Florida Gulf Coast University	Fort Myers, Florida	Active	
**North Carolina Iota**	2010	High Point University	High Point, North Carolina	Active	
**Texas Xi**	2010	University of North Texas	Denton, Texas	Active	
**Virginia Kappa**	2010	University of Lynchburg	Lynchburg, Virginia	Active	
**Washington Gamma**	2010	Eastern Washington University	Cheney, Washington	Active	
**Georgia Kappa**	2011	Morehouse College	Atlanta, Georgia	Active	
**Indiana Zeta**	2011	DePauw University	Greencastle, Indiana	Active	
**Michigan Mu**	2011	Alma College	Alma, Michigan	Active	
**Minnesota Beta**	2011	St. Olaf College	Northfield, Minnesota	Active	
**Rhode Island Beta**	2011	Salve Regina University	Newport, Rhode Island	Active	
**Rhode Island Gamma**	2011	Rhode Island College	Providence, Rhode Island	Active	
**Sourh Dakota Alpha**	2011	Augustana University	Sioux Falls, South Dakota	Active	
**Virginia Lambda**	2011	Hampden–Sydney College	Hampden Sydney, Virginia	Active	
**Iowa Zeta**	2012	Clarke University	Dubuque, Iowa	Active	
**New Jersey Iota**	2012	William Paterson University	Wayne, New Jersey	Active	
**New Jersey Kappa**	2012	The College of New Jersey	Ewing Township, New Jersey	Active	
**New Jersey Lambda**	2012	Rowan University	Glassboro, New Jersey	Active	
**New York Beta**	2012	Brooklyn College	New York City, New York	Active	
**New York Theta**	2012	Nazareth University	Pittsford, New York	Active	
**Alabama Epsilon**	2013	University of Alabama in Huntsville	Huntsville, Alabama	Active	
**California Rho**	2013	San Diego State University	San Diego, California	Active	
**Ohio Sigma**	2013	Baldwin Wallace University	Berea, Ohio	Active	
**Pennsylvania Alpha Beta**	2013	Lehigh University	Bethlehem, Pennsylvania	Active	
**Pennsylvania Alpha Gamma**	2013	Mercyhurst University	Erie, Pennsylvania	Active	
**Texas Omicron**	2013	University of Dallas	Irving, Texas	Active	
**California Sigma**	2014	California State University, Bakersfield	Bakersfield, California	Active	
**California Tau**	2014	California State University, San Bernardino	San Bernardino, California	Active	
**Connecticut Beta**	2014	Southern Connecticut State University	New Haven, Connecticut	Active	
**Illinois Sigma**	2014	Millikin University	Decatur, Illinois	Active	
**Illinois Tau**	2014	DePaul University	Chicago, Illinois	Active	
**Indiana Iota**	2014	Indiana University Southeast	New Albany, Indiana	Active	
**Virginia Mu**	2014	Washington and Lee University	Lexington, Virginia	Active	
**Connecticut Delta**	2015	Quinnipiac University	Hamden, Connecticut	Active	
**Iowa Iota**	2015	Morningside University	Sioux City, Iowa	Active	
**Michigan Nu**	2015	Adrian College	Adrian, Michigan	Active	
**Missouri Xi**	2015	University of Missouri–St. Louis	St. Louis, Missouri	Active	
**Ohio Tau**	2015	Walsh University	North Canton, Ohio	Active	
**New York Mu**	2016	Manhattanville University	Purchase, New York	Active	
**New York Alpha Alpha** (see New York Zeta First)	2016	Iona University	New Rochelle, New York	Active	
**New York Alpha Beta**	2016	Buffalo State University	Buffalo, New York	Active	
**Pennsylvania Xi**	2016	Bucknell University	Lewisburg, Pennsylvania	Active	
**Pennsylvania Omicron**	2016	Susquehanna University	Selinsgrove, Pennsylvania	Active	
**Rhode Island Delta**	2016	University of Rhode Island	Kingston, Rhode Island	Active	
**Virginia Nu**	2016	Emory and Henry University	Emory, Virginia	Active	
**Virginia Xi**	2016	Southern Virginia University	Buena Vista, Virginia	Active	
**Utah Delta**	2017	Southern Utah University	Cedar City, Utah	Active	
**Colorado Gamma**	2018	Fort Lewis College	Durango, Colorado	Active	
**New York Alpha Gamma**	2018	SUNY Brockport	Brockport, New York	Active	
**Oregon Gamma**	2018	Western Oregon University	Monmouth, Oregon	Active	
**Tennessee Zeta**	2018	University of Tennessee at Martin	Martin, Tennessee	Active	
**Pennsylvania Alpha Delta**	2019	Carnegie Mellon University	Pittsburgh, Pennsylvania	Active	
**New Jersey Nu**	2020	Drew University	Madison, New Jersey	Active	
**Wisconsin Eta**	2021	University of Wisconsin–Green Bay	Green Bay, Wisconsin	Active	
**Connecticut Gamma**	2022	Eastern Connecticut State University	Willimantic, Connecticut	Active	
**Mississippi Gamma**	2022	Mississippi State University	Mississippi State, Mississippi	Active	
**Missouri Omicron**	2022	Missouri State University	Springfield, Missouri	Active	
**Texas Pi**	2022	University of Texas at Dallas	Richardson, Texas	Active	
**Illinois Upsilon**	2023	Illinois State University	Normal, Illinois	Active	
**Massachusetts Lambda**	2023	Simmons University	Boston, Massachusetts	Active	
**Missouri Pi**	2023	Saint Louis University	St. Louis, Missouri	Active	
**New York Zeta**	2023	Syracuse University	Syracuse, New York	Active	
**California Upsilon**	2024	California State University, Fullerton	Fullerton, California	Active	
California Mu				Inactive	
Colorado Alpha				Inactive	
Colorado Beta				Inactive	
Florida Gamma				Inactive	
Florida Epsilon				Inactive	
Florida Zeta				Inactive	
Illinois Iota				Inactive	
Illinois Kappa				Inactive	
Illinois Nu				Inactive	
Indiana Eta				Inactive	
Indiana Theta				Inactive	
Iowa Delta				Inactive	
Iowa Eta				Inactive	
Iowa Theta				Inactive	
Kentucky Delta				Inactive	
Maine Alpha				Inactive	
Maryland Beta				Inactive	
Maryland Eta				Inactive	
Massachusetts Epsilon				Inactive	
Massachusetts Zeta				Inactive	
Michigan Epsilon				Inactive	
Michigan Zeta				Inactive	
Michigan Eta				Inactive	
Michigan Theta				Inactive	
Michigan Iota				Inactive	
Michigan Lambda				Inactive	
Minnesota Alpha				Inactive	
Missouri Zeta				Inactive	
Missouri Eta				Inactive	
Missouri Lambda				Inactive	
New Jersey Beta				Inactive	
New Jersey Gamma				Inactive	
New Jersey Mu				Inactive	
Ohio Eta				Inactive	
Ohio Lambda				Inactive	
Ohio Xi				Inactive	
Ohio Omicron				Inactive	
Tennessee Delta				Inactive	
Tennessee Epsilon				Inactive	
Texas Zeta				Inactive	
Texas Theta				Inactive	
Texas Iota				Inactive	
Texas Kappa				Inactive	
Wisconsin Epsilon				Inactive	
