= International Journal of Applied Philosophy =

Biannual peer-reviewed academic journal

- Discipline: Applied philosophy, ethics
- Language: English
- Edited by: Elliot D. Cohen

Publication details
- History: 1982–present
- Publisher: Philosophy Documentation Center (United States)
- Frequency: Biannually

Standard abbreviations
- ISO 4: Int. J. Appl. Philos.

Indexing
- ISSN: 0739-098X (print); 2153-6910 (web)
- LCCN: 83-645132
- OCLC no.: 9693598

Links
- Journal homepage; Online access

The International Journal of Applied Philosophy is a biannual peer-reviewed academic journal that publishes philosophical examinations of practical problems. It was established in 1982, and contains original articles, reviews, and edited discussions of topics of general interest in ethics and applied philosophy. The journal is published by the Philosophy Documentation Center, and some articles are published in co-operation with the Association for Practical and Professional Ethics.

== Subject coverage ==
The journal covers issues in business, education, the environment, government, health care, law, psychology, and science. Special issue topical coverage has included abortion, animal rights, gambling, lying, terrorism, torture, and the foreign policy of the United States.

== Abstracting and indexing ==
The journal is abstracted and indexed in:

- Academic Search Premier
- Expanded Academic ASAP
- FRANCIS
- Humanities International Index
- Index Philosophicus
- InfoTrac OneFile
- International Bibliography of Periodical Literature
- International Bibliography of the Social Sciences
- International Philosophical Bibliography
- MLA International Bibliography
- MEDLINE
- Philosopher's Index
- PhilPapers
- Political Science Complete
- Russian Academy of Sciences Bibliographies
- Scopus
- SocINDEX
- TOC Premier

== See also ==
- List of ethics journals
- List of philosophy journals
