= Tina Rulli =

American philosopher

- Awards: Hellman Fellow, Bouchet Graduate Honor Society, Franke Fellowship

Academic background
- Education: Yale University (PhD), University of Denver (BA)
- Thesis: The Duty to Adopt (2011)
- Doctoral advisor: Stephen Darwall

Academic work
- Discipline: Philosophy
- Institutions: University of California, Davis (2014-), Purdue University (2013-2014), National Institutes of Health (2011-2013)
- Main interests: normative ethics, applied ethics, bioethics
- Website: https://trulli.faculty.ucdavis.edu/

Tina Rulli is an American philosopher and an associate professor in the Philosophy Department at the University of California, Davis. She is known for her works on ethics. Rulli is an editor-in-chief of the Journal of Applied Philosophy.
