= Rick Roderick =

American philosopher

Rick Roderick

Rick Roderick (June 16, 1949 – January 18, 2002) was an American professor of philosophy, best known for his lectures for The Teaching Company.

== Life ==
Roderick was born in Abilene, Texas, on June 16, 1949, son of (by his own description) a "con-man" and a "beautician". He was a teacher of philosophy at several universities, where he was much revered by many students for a Socratic style of teaching combined with a brash and often humorous approach. His breakthrough into wider circles came with his engagement with The Teaching Company where he recorded several lecture series. Rick Roderick died on January 18, 2002, from a congestive heart condition.

== Academic career ==
Roderick first studied communication (self-admittedly in order to focus on anti-establishment student and anti-war activities), but moved after a few years towards philosophy. He received his B.A. at the University of Texas at Austin, did post-graduate work at Baylor University and finally earned his Ph.D. at the University of Texas under the supervision of Douglas Kellner.

After 1977 Roderick taught at Baylor University, the University of Texas, Duke University and National University in Los Angeles. He was the recipient of the Oldright Fellowship at the University of Texas and served as associate editor to The Pawn Review and Current Perspectives in Social Theory. He served as editor of the Baylor Philosophy Journal and was a member of the Phi Sigma Tau National Honor Society of Philosophy. He presented more than 25 papers, and published 13 reviews and literary criticisms, as well as numerous articles in professional journals.

Roderick was the author of the book Habermas and the Foundations of Critical Theory (1986).

== Selected publications ==
- 1986, Habermas and the foundations of critical theory, Macmillan, 194 pages. ISBN 0-333-39655-3
- 1986, Rick Roderick - Reading Derrida Politically (Contra Rorty), PRAXIS International, issue: 4 / 1986

=== The Teaching Company series ===
- "Philosophy and Human Values", 1990
- "Nietzsche and the Post-Modern Condition", 1991
- "Self under Siege - Philosophy in the 20th Century", 1993
- "Mill on Liberty", guest lecture from "The Great Minds of Western Intellectual Tradition" (1st ed), Part IV, Philosophy in the Epoch of Ideology, 2000

== See also ==
- American philosophy
- List of American philosophers
