= Avery Kolers =

American professor

Avery Kolers is an American professor in the Philosophy Department at the University of Tennessee, Knoxville. He was previously professor and chair of philosophy at the University of Louisville. Kolers specializes in social and political philosophy. Kolers is a co-editor of the Journal of Applied Philosophy and a member of the Kentucky Climate Consortium. Kolers has written extensively surrounding the ideas of territory and solidarity.

Kolers received his bachelor's degree in philosophy from Brown University. He attended graduate school at the University of Arizona, where he participated in protests advocating for the school's partners in the apparel industry, including Nike Inc., to agree to reforms in their labor practices."

== Books ==
- Kolers, Avery (August 2009). Land, Conflict, and Justice. Cambridge University Press. ISBN 9780511575709.
- Kolers, Avery (7 July 2016). A Moral Theory of Solidarity. Oxford University Press. ISBN 9780198769781.
