= Association for Practical and Professional Ethics =

American non-profit organization

Coordinates: 39°9′50.4″N 86°31′35.3″W

The Association for Practical and Professional Ethics (APPE) is a non-profit professional organization that supports research, training, and education in practical and professional ethics. It was founded in 1991 with support from Indiana University and the Lilly Endowment to encourage interdisciplinary scholarship and teaching among educators and practitioners. The association sponsors the Intercollegiate Ethics Bowl. The association was hosted on the Indiana University Bloomington campus until mid-2017, when APPE moved to the Prindle Institute for Ethics at DePauw University in Greencastle, Indiana.

== Online resources for members ==
Members have online access to the following resources:

- Ethically Speaking (newsletter)
- Membership Directory (All membership information)
- Profiles in Ethics (institutional member profiles)
- Optional, with special discount: International Journal of Applied Philosophy (1982–present)

== Annual Conference ==
The Annual Conference of the Association for Practical and Professional Ethics is held in late February or early March each year at a different location in the United States. In 2022, the conference will be held from February 24-27 at the Hilton Cincinnati Netherland Plaza Hotel.
