= Pre-theoretic belief =

Topic in linguistics and philosophy

Pre-theoretical belief has been an important notion in some areas of linguistics and philosophy, especially phenomenology and older versions of "ordinary language" philosophy. It is often assumed, rightly or wrongly, that language depends on mental concepts, and that certain concepts are innate. These innate concepts provide sources of very basic linguistic competency, available to any natural language speaker that enable more complex forms of language use, including philosophical, scientific, or other types of technical language. These basic concepts, in combination, may form basic propositional attitudes about things and events. Often "pre-theoretical belief" refers to these basic propositional attitudes. Also, "pre-theoretical beliefs" may refer to simple intuitions.

Pre-theoretic belief is a term used in philosophical arguments for and against libertarianism and determinism.
