= Journal of Applied Philosophy =

- Discipline: Applied philosophy
- Language: English
- Edited by: Avery Kolers, Tina Rulli

Publication details
- History: Since 1984
- Publisher: Wiley-Blackwell
- Frequency: 5/year
- Open access: Hybrid
- Impact factor: 0.9 (2024)

Standard abbreviations
- ISO 4: J. Appl. Philos.

Indexing
- ISSN: 0264-3758 (print); 1468-5930 (web)
- LCCN: 86649990
- JSTOR: 02643758
- OCLC no.: 40341378

Links
- Journal homepage; Online access; Online archive

The Journal of Applied Philosophy is a peer-reviewed academic journal published by Wiley-Blackwell on behalf of the Society for Applied Philosophy and co-edited by Avery Kolers (University of Tennessee, Knoxville) and Tina Rulli (University of California, Davis). It covers a broad spectrum of issues in all areas of applied philosophy, including work on the environment, medicine, science, engineering, policy, law, politics, economics, and education.

According to the Journal Citation Reports, the journal has a 2024 impact factor of 0.9.

== Annual Essay Prize ==
The journal awards an annual prize of £1,000 for the best article published in the year's volume.

== Society for Applied Philosophy Annual Lectures ==
Each year since 2010, the journal has published the Annual Lecture hosted by the Society of Applied Philosophy.

== Charles Mills Prize ==
In 2023, the journal announced a new prize in honor of the late Charles W. Mills, who had served as an editorial board member. The prize, in the amount of £1,500, is awarded biannually for an outstanding paper published in the journal in the spirit, and on the themes, of Mills’ work, including racial injustice, philosophy of race, non-ideal theory, and ideology.

== See also ==
- List of ethics journals
