= Society for Applied Philosophy =

The Society for Applied Philosophy is a philosophical organization founded in 1982 by Brenda Almond. The purpose of the organization is promoting study and research in philosophy in areas with real-world applications, and work that is intended to make a constructive contribution to problems in these areas. To these ends, the society sponsors workshops, conferences, and lectures. The Journal of Applied Philosophy is published by Blackwell on behalf of the society.

In 2017, the president of the society was Onora O'Neill.
