= Intercollegiate Ethics Bowl =

Annual intercollegiate debate competition

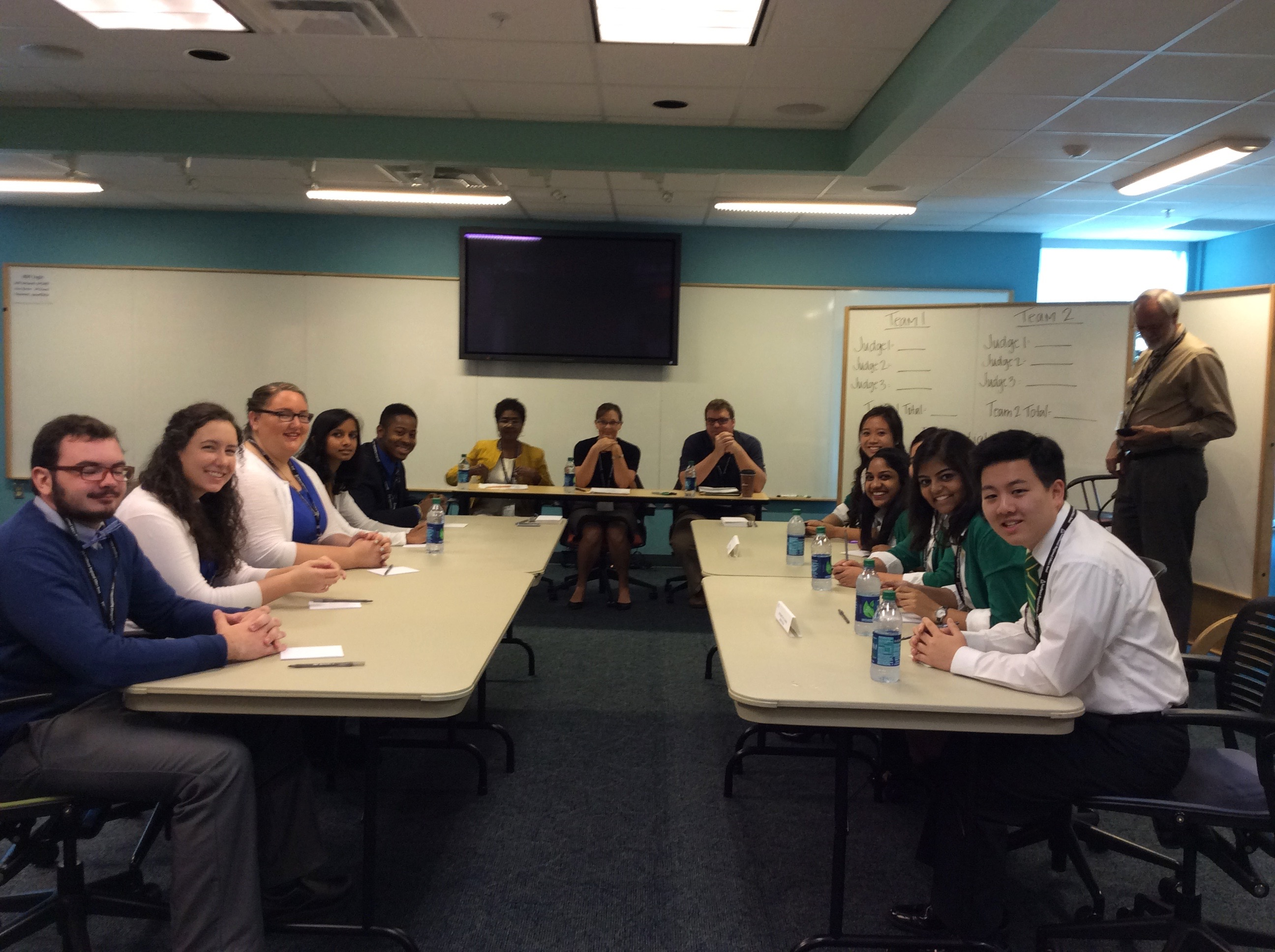
Ethics Bowl competition about to begin

The Intercollegiate Ethics Bowl is an annual competitive intercollegiate ethics debate tournament for university students in the United States organized by the Association for Practical and Professional Ethics (APPE). While the term bowl is a reference to American football bowl games, the event itself may have been inspired more directly by the College Bowl quiz show.

The first Ethics Bowl contest was held in 1993 at the Illinois Institute of Technology. Three judges ask each team questions that arise on topics ranging from professional ethics to social and political topics, and team members' responses, to each other as well as to the judges, are then scored by the judges. Since 1997, the national Ethics Bowl Competition has taken place every year at the annual meeting of the Association for Practical and Professional Ethics.

For the past few years ten regional bowls have taken place throughout the U.S. with over 100 teams competing. The top 32 teams are then invited to participate in the national competition. In 2008, a spin-off began, the Bioethics Bowl, which focuses exclusively on ethical issues in health care.

Along with the Intercollegiate Ethics Bowl for undergraduates, a number of other ethics bowl competitions are held, including the Bioethics Bowl and one sponsored by the Society for American Archeology. The Parr Center for Ethics at the University of North Carolina at Chapel Hill is the headquarters for the National High School Ethics Bowl. The National High School Ethics Bowl currently sponsors 36 regional competitions across the United States, excluding two unaffiliated competitions in Canada and England, and the national competition takes place every spring at UNC Chapel Hill. Regional winners participate in a virtual playoff against other high school winners to earn a spot at this national championship. Ethics Bowl is also increasingly being introduced to adults, including uses for professional development programs and enrichment programming for older adults living in retirement communities.

An international version of the same event has been established using Zoom to bring high school students together called an Ethics Olympiad.

== Ethics Bowl format ==
While the organization of Ethics Bowl tournaments can vary from region to region, single rounds generally follow a given format. Four to six weeks before the date of the competition, the competing teams, judges, and moderators are given a packet of case studies that present ethical issues to study. The goal for the teams is both to do research on the cases and to formulate well structured, logical answers to questions asked about the cases.

In each round, the first team gets one of twelve to fifteen cases randomly assigned plus a question from the moderator. The first team then has ten minutes to present the central moral issues of the cases, as well as alternative points of view. The responding team then comments for five minutes on the first team's analysis, and the first team then responds to these comments for five minutes. Finally, a panel of judges asks questions of the first team for ten minutes. The judges then pause to evaluate the first teams' response and the second team's comments. The round then repeats this format with the second team receiving a question about a different case.

In the national competition of the Intercollegiate Ethics Bowl, during the first evening, each team competes in two rounds against different teams. Two more rounds commence the next morning, and then the top eight teams continue on to the last rounds, all of which are single-elimination: quarter finals, semi finals, and lastly, the final round where the two remaining teams compete to determine the winner.

== History ==
The Ethics Bowl was developed in 1993 by Dr. Robert Ladenson of the Illinois Institute of Technology. An intramural Ethics Bowl was held at IIT for two years, and in 1995 a small local competition was held where teams from DePaul University, Loyola University, and Western Michigan University were invited to compete against the winning IIT from that year's competition. In 1996, the same four schools participated in the local competition, along with a team from the United States Air Force Academy.

The first nationwide Intercollegiate Ethics Bowl was held in 1997 in Washington, D.C., in conjunction with the annual meeting of the Association for Practical and Professional Ethics. Since that time, the Ethics Bowl has taken place at the APPE annual meeting every year. The University of Montana won the National Championship in 1997. The United States Military Academy competed in and won the National Championship in 1998 and 1999. In 2006, due to the number of teams wishing to participate in the Ethics Bowl, regional competitions were held at locations throughout the U.S., and the top-scoring 32 teams were invited to participate in the national competition held in February, 2007. In 2026, 36 teams from across the country competed. As of 2026, the United States Military Academy has the most championships at four, followed closely by Whitworth University with three.

=== History of competitions ===
Year	Champion	Runner-Up	Reference
1997	University of Montana		
1998	United States Military Academy	United States Air Force Academy	
1999	United States Military Academy		
2002	Wright State University		
2003	United States Naval Academy	Indiana University	
2006	United States Military Academy		
2007	University of Miami	Westminster College	
2008	Clemson University	Westminster College	
2009	Indiana University	Clemson University	
2010	University of Alabama at Birmingham	Weber State University	
2011	University of Central Florida	Montana State	
2012	Whitworth University	Clemson University	
2013	DePauw University	Taylor University	
2014	University of Montana	University of Oklahoma	
2015	Taylor University	Whitworth University	
2016	Whitworth University	Youngstown State University	
2017	United States Military Academy	Youngstown State University	
2018	Santa Clara University	University of Oklahoma	
2019	Whitworth University	University of Alabama at Birmingham	
2020	Youngstown State University	Tufts University	
2021	University of Cincinnati	Whitworth University	
2022	Macalester College	University of Chicago	
2023	United States Naval Academy	Tufts University	
2024	University of North Carolina at Chapel Hill	University of California, Santa Barbara	
2025	Macalester College	Stanford University	
2026	College of William & Mary	Seattle University	
