= Bernard Boxill =

American philosopher

Bernard R Boxill is an American philosopher and distinguished professor of philosophy emeritus at the University of North Carolina at Chapel Hill. He is known for his works on ethics and political philosophy. He was elected a member of the American Academy of Arts and Sciences in 2018.

== Selected works ==
- Blacks and social justice. Totowa, NJ: Rowman & Allanheld. 1984. ISBN 978-0-8476-6755-0.
