= Phi Sigma Tau =

International honor society for philosophers

- ΦΣΤ
- Founded: 1930; 96 years ago Muhlenberg College
- Type: Honor
- Affiliation: ACHS
- Status: Active
- Emphasis: Philosophy
- Scope: North America
- Motto: Φιλούντων Σοφίαν Τιμή "The honor of those who love wisdom"
- Colors: White and Purple
- Publication: Dialogue
- Chapters: 240
- Members: 36,000+ lifetime
- Headquarters: c/o Dr. Matthew D. Lund, Executive Secretary, Ric Edelman College of Communication, Humanities & Social Science, Rowan University; 201 Mullica Hill Road, Glassboro, NJ 08028; Glassboro, New Jersey 08028; United States
- Website: phisigmatau.org

Phi Sigma Tau (ΦΣΤ, or PST) is an international honor society for philosophers. In addition to providing a means of awarding distinction to students with high scholarship and interest in philosophy, Phi Sigma Tau also promotes interest in philosophy among the general collegiate public. There are currently 200 active chapters in the U.S. and Canada, with 31301 members.

== History ==
The society was founded in 1930 at Muhlenberg College as Alpha Kappa Alpha, with a regional organization with chapters in Pennsylvania and Maryland. The society held annual meetings where student shared and discussed papers that were later published in Philosoph.

The society was incorporated as Phi Sigma Tau on October 21, 1955. Its mission is to honor academic achievement and interest in philosophy, encourage student research, provide opportunities to published papers, and create ties between philosophy students and programs at various institutions.

Since 1955, the society has published a biannual philosophy journal called Dialogue, which publishes articles from the entire field of philosophy, regardless of whether the contributor is a member of Phi Sigma Tau. On October 21, 1958, the society was admitted to membership in the Association of College Honor Societies. Phi Sigma Tau held its first national convention in 1960 at Gettysburg College.

In 1991, Phi Sigma Tau became an international society by installing its first Canadian chapter. In 2011, it had 238 active chapters, 1,193 current members, and 35,658 lifetime members.

There are currently 200 active chapters in the U.S. and Canada, with 31,301 members. Its national headquarters are at Rowan University in Glassboro, New Jersey.

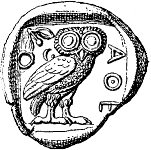
The reverse of the Athenian tetradrachm is the seal of ΦΣΤ.

== Symbols ==
The emblem of Phi Sigma Tau is in the shape of a pentagon; each of the five angles contains a symbol that represents one of the five streams of world thought: Chinese, Indian, Islamic, Hebrew, and Greek. The seal of Phi Sigma Tau is the reverse side of the Athenian silver tetradrachm, which bears the owl of Pallas Athene, the goddess of wisdom and rational inquiry, an olive spray, a small crescent, and the name of Athena in Greek. The margin of the seal bears the name of the society. The colors of Phi Sigma Tau are white and purple.

The motto of Phi Sigma Tau is Φιλούντων σοφίαν τιμή (Philoúnton sophían timé), Greek for "the honor of those who love wisdom." Its colors are white and purple. Its graduating members may wear white and purple honor cords.

== Membership ==
The current membership requirements are variable from chapter to chapter, but in general, undergraduate students are eligible for active membership if they have completed two semesters of college, rank in the upper 35% of their class, and have completed at least two-semester courses in philosophy with an average overall grade which is greater than the second highest grade of the working scale. The society also inducts graduate students, professors, and non-affiliated personnel.

== Notable members ==
- Jan Boxill, chair of the faculty and director of University of North Carolina at Chapel Hill Parr Center for Ethics
- Daniel Elliott, Kentucky House of Representatives
- Rick Roderick, professor of philosophy, best known for his lectures for The Teaching Company.
