= Bioethics Bowl =

Intercollegiate competition

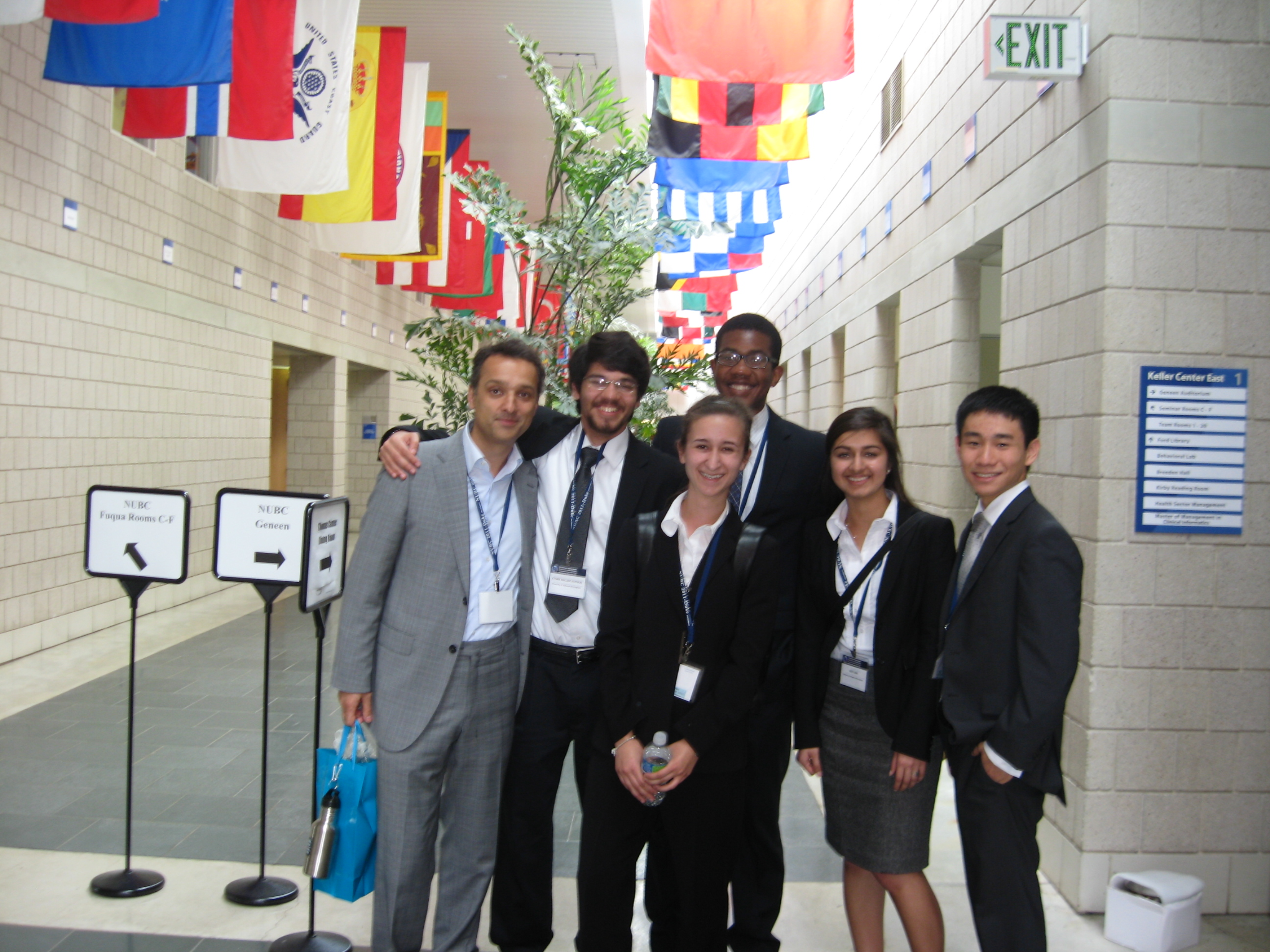
UAB Bioethics Bowl Team at Duke University in 2011

The Bioethics Bowl is an intercollegiate, academic competition among undergraduate students at accredited four-year institutions of higher education. It takes place each April on a college campus. Unlike the Intercollegiate Ethics Bowl, which debates cases across the curriculum from agricultural and engineering ethics to issues of grade inflation and communications, the Bioethics Bowl focuses exclusively on ethical issues in the health and biological sciences.

== Format ==
In late January or early February, the competing teams, judges, and moderators receive 15 case studies which represent controversial bioethical issues. The goal for each team is both to do research on the cases and to formulate well-structured, logical analyses pertaining to 3 questions posed (in advance) about each case.

In each round, the first team gets one of the 12-15 cases randomly assigned plus one of the 3 questions from the moderator. The first team then has 10 minutes to present: (1) the central moral issues of the cases, and (2) alternative points of view. The responding team then comments for 5 minutes on the first team's analysis, and the first team then responds for 5 more minutes to these comments. Finally, a panel of 3 judges asks questions for 10 minutes to the presenting team. The judges then pause to evaluate the first teams' response and the second team's comments. The round then repeats this format with the second team receiving a question about a different case. A video about how the competition worked in 2026 is available.

== History ==
It began in 2008 at Union College in Schenectady, New York in connection with the 11th National Undergraduate Bioethics Conference, (which consisted of outside speakers for students’ and poster presentations by students).

Michael Mathias, who coached Union's Ethics Bowl team from 2003 to 2007, organized the first Bioethics Bowl at Union College, with the help of Bob Baker. It had 11 cases and six teams. Bob Ladenson and Patrick Croskery, founders of the Ethics Bowl, enthusiastically supported this new Bowl.

The following year, Harvard University hosted in Cambridge, MA. Bioethicist Peter Singer then gave the keynote address and 12 teams participated.

By 2017, the burden of supporting NUBC as a conference organized by undergraduates grew too much, when the Bioethics Bowl also almost collapsed.

In 2017, to keep something going, Richard Greene and Rachel Robison-Greene of Weber State University in Ogden, UT, agreed to keep the Bioethics Bowl alone going. Fifteen teams participated that year. Ann Jeffrey of the University of South Alabama then stepped forward and kept the Bowl going for two more years there.

Since 2017, the Bioethics Bowl has existed on its own and is governed by a small executive committee. The executive committee runs its web site and chooses an institution each year to host its official national competition. In 2026, so many teams wanted to compete that a lottery was held to select 20 teams from a possible 36 teams. After 4 teams withdrew, 4 were added from the waitlist, but alas, 12 teams could not be accommodated, leading to a desire in the future to expand the scope of the Bowl.

== History of Competitions ==
Year	Host city	Host School	Champions	Runners-up	Ref
2008	Schenectady, New York	Union College	National Hispanic University	University of Miami	
2009	Cambridge, Massachusetts	Harvard University	University of North Carolina at Chapel Hill	University of Miami	
2010	Tacoma, Washington	University of Puget Sound	University of Denver	University of Miami	
2011	Durham, North Carolina	Duke University	University of Alabama at Birmingham	Georgetown University	
2012	Denver, Colorado	University of Denver	DePauw University	Georgetown University	
2013	Washington, D.C.	Georgetown University	Georgetown University	University of Denver	
2014	Chicago, Illinois	Loyola University Chicago	Loyola University Chicago	Georgetown University	
2015	Tallahassee, Florida	Florida State University	University of Alabama at Birmingham	Samford University	
2016	Cleveland, Ohio	Case Western Reserve University	Loyola University Chicago	Georgetown University	
2017	Ogden, Utah	Weber State University	University of Portland	Georgetown University	
2018	Mobile, Alabama	University of South Alabama	University of Portland	DePauw University	
2019	Mobile, Alabama	University of South Alabama	University of Alabama at Birmingham	Georgetown University	
2020	Boston, Massachusetts	Northeastern University	Canceled due to COVID-19 pandemic		
2021	Held virtually	Oklahoma State University	Macalester College	San Jose State University University of Alabama at Birmingham (tied)	
2022	Salt Lake City, Utah	Westminster University	Loyola University Chicago	Northeastern University	
2023	Boston, Massachusetts	Northeastern University	Georgetown University	University of Maryland, Baltimore County	
2024	Waco, Texas	Baylor University	Stanford University	Georgetown University	
2025	Salt Lake City, Utah	Westminster University	Georgetown University	University of Portland	
2026	Pittsburgh, Pennsylvania	University of Pittsburgh	Stanford University	University of Pittsburgh	
