= Charles Sanders Peirce bibliography =

The following list consolidates numerous references to the writings of Charles Sanders Peirce, including letters, manuscripts, publications, and Nachlass. For an extensive chronological list of Peirce's works (titled in English), see the Chronologische Übersicht (Chronological Overview) on the Schriften (Writings) page for Charles Sanders Peirce.

== Abbreviations ==
Click on abbreviation in order to jump down this page to the relevant edition information. Click on the abbreviation appearing with that edition information in order to return here.

=== Main editions (posthumous) ===
CP x.y	=	Collected Papers of Charles Sanders Peirce, volume x, paragraph y.
CN x:y	=	Contributions to 'The Nation' , volume x, page y. (Some scholars use "N".)
EP x:y	=	The Essential Peirce: Selected Philosophical Writings, volume x, page y.
HP x:y	=	Historical Perspectives on Peirce's Logic of Science: A History of Science, volume x, page y.
NEM x:y	=	The New Elements of Mathematics by Charles S. Peirce, volume x, page y. (Some scholars use "NE".)
PMSW x	=	Philosophy of Mathematics: Selected Writings, page x. (No established scholarly abbreviation yet.)
PPM x	=	Pragmatism as a Principle and Method of Right Thinking: The 1903 Harvard "Lectures on Pragmatism", page x. (Some scholars use "HL".)
RLT x	=	Reasoning and the Logic of Things, page x.
SS x	=	Semiotic and Significs: The Correspondence between C. S. Peirce and Victoria Lady Welby, page x. (Some scholars use "PW".)
W x:y	=	Writings of Charles S. Peirce: A Chronological Edition, volume x, page y.

=== Other ===
CLL x	=	Chance, Love and Logic: Philosophical Essays, page x.
LI x	=	The Logic of Interdisciplinarity: The Monist-series, page x.
PSWS x	=	Peirce on Signs: Writings on Semiotic, page x. ("PSWS" coined for this wiki.)
PWP x	=	Philosophical Writings of Peirce, page x.
SIL x	=	Studies in Logic by Members of the Johns Hopkins University, page x.
SW x	=	Charles S. Peirce, Selected Writings, page x.
PEP	=	Peirce Edition Project.
TCSPS	=	Transactions of the Charles S. Peirce Society

== Primary literature ==
The manuscript material now (1997) comes to more than a hundred thousand pages. These contain many pages of no philosophical interest, but the number of pages on philosophy certainly number much more than half of that. Also, a significant but unknown number of manuscripts have been lost.

— Joseph Ransdell, 1997.

=== Bibliographies and microfilms ===
Microfilm	Bibliography
The Charles S. Peirce Papers [the Nachlass]
(1966) The Charles S. Peirce Papers, Microfilm Edition, Thirty Reels with Two Supplementary Reels Later Added.; Harvard also made microfilms of Peirce's professional correspondence, cataloged by Robin (1967; see on right). (Note: Both of Robin's catalogues, together with color image scans of complete works in the microfilm edition, are freely accessible at the repository institution's online library catalog (HOLLIS) as the Charles Sanders Peirce Papers (MS Am 1632) Houghton Library, Harvard University (HOLLIS # 000602456).)	Robin, Richard S. (1967). Annotated Catalogue of the Papers of Charles S. Peirce.; — (1971). "The Peirce Papers: A Supplementary Catalogue." Transactions of the Charles S. Peirce Society 7(1):37–57.; On the vicissitudes of Peirce's papers, see Houser (1989). (Note: Reportedly the papers remain in unsatisfactory condition. Pietarinen, Ahti-Veikko, (29 March 2012), "Memorandum to the President of Charles S. Peirce Society" (ePrint). University of Helsinki.)
Complete Published Works
(1977) Charles Sanders Peirce: Complete Published Works, Including Selected Secondary Materials. Microfiche Edition.; Made available along with it was a microfiche of Ketner (1977; see on right).	Ketner, Kenneth Laine, et al. (1977). A Comprehensive Bibliography and Index of the Published Works of Charles Sanders Peirce, with a Bibliography of Secondary Studies.

==== Other bibliographies of primary literature ====
- Burks, Arthur W. (1958). "Bibliography of the Works of Charles Sanders Peirce." CP 8:260–321.
- Cohen, Morris R. (1916). "Charles S. Peirce and a Tentative Bibliography of His Published Writings." The Journal of Philosophy, Psychology, and Scientific Methods 13(26):726–37.
- Fisch, Max H. (1964). "A First Supplement to Arthur W. Burks's Bibliography of the Works of Charles Sanders Peirce." In Studies in the Philosophy of Charles Sanders Peirce, Second Series. (Note: Also contains a bibliography of secondary literature prior to 1964 (pp. 486–514).)
- — (1966). "A Second Supplement to Arthur W. Burks's Bibliography of the Works of Charles Sanders Peirce." Transactions of the Charles S. Peirce Society 2(1):51–53.
- — (1974). "Supplements to the Peirce Bibliographies." Transactions of the Charles S. Peirce Society 10(2).
- Fisch, Max H., and Daniel C. Haskell (1952). "Some Additions to Morris R. Cohen's Bibliography of Peirce's Published Writings." Pp. 375–81 in Studies in the Philosophy of Charles Sanders Peirce.
- Kloesel, Christian J. W. (1982). "Bibliography of Charles Peirce 1976 through 1980," (The Relevance of Charles Peirce 2). The Monist 65(2):246–76.
- NOAA Central Library. 2007. "Charles Sanders Peirce." The Coast and Geodetic Survey Annual Reports 1844–1910 Bibliography of Appendices.
- Parker, Kelly A. (Note: Shook, John R. (1998), Pragmatism. An Annotated Bibliography 1898–1940, with contributions by E. P. Colella, L. Friedman, F. X. Ryan, and I. K. Skrupskelis. Amsterdam: Rodopi. ISBN 978-90-420-0269-2, 90-420-0269-7. Rodopi catalog page.) (2002) [1999]. "Charles S. Peirce on Esthetics and Ethics: A Bibliography." PEP.
- Shook, John R. (1998), Pragmatism. An Annotated Bibliography 1898–1940.

=== Main editions ===
==== Collected Papers (CP) ====
Collected Papers of Charles Sanders Peirce, vols. 1–6 (1931–1935), vols. 7–8 (1958). (Note: Table of contents of each volume: Collected Papers in "Schriften von Charles Sanders Peirce" at the German Wikipedia (contents in English). Review: Ernest, Paul (1997). "Review of the Electronic Edition of 'The Collected Papers of C. S. Peirce'." Philosophy of Mathematics Education Journal 10.)

- Volume 1, Principles of Philosophy, 1931.
- Volume 2, Elements of Logic, 1932.
- Volume 3, Exact Logic (Published Papers), 1933.
- Volume 4, The Simplest Mathematics, 1933, 601 pages.
- Volume 5, Pragmatism and Pragmaticism, 1934.
- Volume 6, Scientific Metaphysics, 1935.
- Volume 7, Science and Philosophy, 1958.
- Volume 8, Reviews, Correspondence, and Bibliography, 1958.
- Belknap Press, edition with pairs of volumes bound as one (HUP catalog pages):
  - vols. 1–2, 962 pages (ISBN 0-674-13800-7)
  - vols. 3–4, 1064 pages (ISBN 0-674-13801-5)
  - vols. 5–6, 944 pages (ISBN 0-674-13802-3)
  - vols. 7–8, 798 pages (ISBN 0-674-13803-1).
- Much of Volume 1, without editorial notes Eprint.
- Some of Volume 5, without editorial notes Eprint.
- 1998. Volumes 1–8. Reprinted, Thoemmes Continuum.

The Writings or the Chronological Edition (W)

- Peirce Edition Project, eds. (1982–). Writings of Charles S. Peirce, A Chronological Edition. (Note: de Waal, Cornelis. 2009. "The Writings of Charles S. Peirce." PEP. "Work on volume 7, which will contain a selection of Peirce's Century Dictionary definitions, continues steadily, as does work on volumes 9 (1892–1893) and 11 (Peirce's "How to Reason" aka the "Grand Logic").")
  - Volume 1 (1857–1866)
  - Volume 2 (1867–1871)
  - Volume 3 (1872–1878)
  - Volume 4 (1879–1884)
  - Volume 5 (1884–1886)
  - Volume 6 (1886–1890)
  - Volume 8 (1890–1892)
- Volumes 1–6. Online via InteLex.

Contributions to The Nation (CN or N)

- Peirce, C. S., "Charles Sanders Peirce: Contributions to The Nation", 4 volumes, Kenneth Laine Ketner and James Edward Cook, eds., Texas Technological University Press, Lubbock, TX, 1975–1987.
  - Part 1 (1869–1893), 1975, 208 pages.
  - Part 2 (1894–1900), 1975, 281 pages.
  - Part 3 (1901–1908), 1979, 306 pages.
  - Part 4 (Index), 1987, 252 pages. In print (TTU catalog page).
- Volumes 1–4. Online via InteLex.
- The Institute for Studies in Pragmaticism (Ketner et al.) is placing Contributions and the Comprehensive Bibliography free online: The Published Works of Charles Sanders Peirce.

New Elements of Mathematics (NEM or NE)

- Peirce, C. S., The New Elements of Mathematics by Charles S. Peirce, 4 volumes in 5, Carolyn Eisele, ed., Mouton Publishers, The Hague, Netherlands, 1976. De Gruyter catalog page. Humanities Press, Atlantic Highlands, NJ, 1976. cxxxviii + 2478 pages in total. Each volume has a Library of Congress (LoC) 10-digit ISBN. Each volume, except for Volume II, has Mouton copyright information accompanied by another 10-digit ISBN. Now back in print, the catalog pages showing 12-digit ISBNs different from those generable from the 10-digit ISBNs.
  - Volume I, Arithmetic, xl + 260 pages. LoC ISBN 0-391-00612-6, Mouton ISBN 90-279-3174-7. New ISBN 978-3-11-086970-5.
  - Volume II, Algebra and Geometry, xxxi + 672 pages. LoC ISBN 90-279-3025-2, no Mouton ISBN in volume. New ISBN 978-3-11-081884-0.
  - Volume III/1, Mathematical Miscellanea, xxxix + 763 pages (1–763). LoC ISBN 039100641X, Mouton ISBN 90 279 3035 X. New ISBN 978-3-11-156339-8.
  - Volume III/2, Mathematical Miscellanea, 390 pages (764–1153). LoC ISBN 039100641X, Mouton ISBN 90 279 3035 X. New ISBN 978-3-11-156340-4.
  - Volume IV, Mathematical Philosophy, xxviii + 393 pages. LoC ISBN 0 391 00642 8, Mouton ISBN 90 279 3045 7. New ISBN 978-3-11-080588-8.

Some online sources incorrectly list the ISBNs of these volumes, for example, sometimes interchanging those of volumes II and III(1/2).

Review PDF by Arthur W. Burks in the Bulletin of the American Mathematical Society, vol. 84, no. 5, Sept. 1978.

Historical Perspectives on Peirce's Logic of Science (HP)

- Peirce, C. S., Historical Perspectives on Peirce's Logic of Science: A History of Science, 2 vols., Carolyn Eisele, ed., Mouton De Gruyter (catalog page), Berlin, New York, Amsterdam, 1985, x + 1,131 pages, hardcover (ISBN 978-0899250342, ISBN 0-89925-034-3). Back in print, new ISBN 978-3-11-181076-8. Has Peirce's "papers, grant applications, and publishers' prospectuses in the history and practice of science," said Auspitz.
- Peirce, C.S., The Logic of Interdisciplinarity. Charles S. Peirce, The Monist Series, Elize Bisanz, ed., Akademie Verlag, Berlin, 2009, 455 pages, hardcover (ISBN 978-3-05-004410-1).

Semiotic and Significs (SS or PW)

- Peirce, C. S., and Welby-Gregory, Victoria (Lady Welby), Semiotic and Significs: The Correspondence between C. S. Peirce and Victoria Lady Welby, edited by Charles S. Hardwick with the assistance of James Cook, Indiana University Press, Bloomington and Indianapolis, IN, 1977, 201 pages, paperback (ISBN 0253351634, ISBN 978-0-253-35163-0). 2nd edition (Peirce Studies #8), 2001, the Press of Arisbe Associates, Elsah, IL, 250 pages (ISBN 978-0966769517, ISBN 0-9667695-1-1).

Essential Peirce (EP)

- Peirce, C. S., The Essential Peirce, Selected Philosophical Writings, Volume 1 (1867–1893), Nathan Houser and Christian J. W. Kloesel, eds., Indiana University Press, Bloomington and Indianapolis, IN, 1992. Information. Introduction by Nathan Houser.
- Peirce, C. S., The Essential Peirce, Selected Philosophical Writings, Volume 2 (1893–1913), Peirce Edition Project, eds., Indiana University Press, Bloomington and Indianapolis, IN, 1998. Information. Introduction by Nathan Houser.

Philosophy of Mathematics (PMSW)

- Peirce, C. S., Philosophy of Mathematics: Selected Writings, Matthew E. Moore, ed., Indiana University Press, Bloomington and Indianapolis, IN, 2010, publisher catalog page. First in a series Selections from the Writings of Charles S. Peirce. Hardcover (ISBN 978-0-253-35563-8), paper (ISBN 978-0-253-22265-7). Table of contents. Includes many writings appearing in print for the first time. Excerpts of previously widely published articles ("The Regenerated Logic", "Prolegomena to an Apology for Pragmaticism", "The Law of Mind") are reprinted, with Moore's introductions.)

==== Lectures by Peirce ====
1865 spring:	Harvard lectures on "The Logic of Science". (I-XI et al., W 1:162-302). Lect. I Arisbe "Eprint" (PDF). (106 KiB).
1866 Oct. 24 – Dec. 1:	Lowell Institute lectures on "The Logic of Science; or Induction and Hypothesis". (I-XI et al., W 1:358-530)
1869 Dec. 14 – 1870 Jan. 15:	Harvard lectures on "British Logicians". (Some in W 1:310-347). See below.
1879–1884:	Johns Hopkins University Lecturer in Logic. Introductory Lecture Sept. 1882, Johns Hopkins University Circulars, v. 2, n. 19, p p. 11-12, Nov. 1882. EP 1:214-214, CP 7.59-76, W 4:378-382.
1892 Nov. 28 – 1893 Jan. 5:	Lowell lectures on "The History of Science". 12 lectures. Robin Catalogue describes notes in MSS 1274–1283. ("Concluding Remarks" CP 7.267–275. All in HP 2:139–296.)
1898 Feb. 10 – Mar. 7:	Cambridge (MA) conference lectures (at Mrs. Ole Bull's) on "Reasoning and the Logic of Things". See below.
1903 Mar. 26 – May 17:	Harvard lectures on "Pragmatism". See below.
1903 Nov. 23 – Dec. 17:	Lowell lectures on "Some Topics of Logic bearing on Questions now Vexed". See below.
1905:	Adirondack Summer School Lectures. On the nature and classification of the sciences. MS 1334, 59 pp., 35–36 in CP 1.284 and 7–23 on pp. 46–48 in Classical American Philosophy, Stuhr, ed. Nubiola quotes from MS pp. 11–14 and 20.
1907 Apr. 8–13:	Harvard Philosophy Club lectures on "Logical Methodeutic".
Sources: Peirce Edition Project's Peirce Chronology and "Peirce, Charles Sanders" (1934) by Paul Weiss.

On British Logicians (the 1869–1870 Harvard lectures)

- Peirce, C. S. (1869 Dec. – 1870 Jan), lectures at Harvard on the history of logic, focusing on the history of British logic.
  - "Lecture I. Early nominalism and realism", MS 158: November–December 1869, W 2:310-316, PEP Eprint.
  - "Ockam. Lecture 3", MS 160: November–December 1869, W 2:317-336, PEP Eprint.
  - "Whewell", MS 162: November–December 1869, W 2:337-347, PEP Eprint.

Reasoning and the Logic of Things (RLT) (The 1898 Lectures in Cambridge, MA)

- Peirce, C. S., Reasoning and the Logic of Things, The Cambridge Conference Lectures of 1898, Kenneth Laine Ketner, ed., intro., and Hilary Putnam, intro., commentary, Harvard, 1992, 312 pages, hardcover (ISBN 978-0674749665, ISBN 0-674-74966-9), softcover (ISBN 978-0-674-74967-2, ISBN 0-674-74967-7) H.U.P. catalog page. Text of the lectures that William James invited Peirce to give in Cambridge, MA. (Extracts variously from drafts and from delivered lectures were earlier published in CP 1.616-677, 6.1-5, 185-213, 214-221, 222-237, 7.468-517.)

Editorial Procedures, xi-xii Abbreviations, xiii-xiv Introduction: The Consequences of Mathematics, 1-54 (Kenneth Laine Ketner and Hilary Putman); Comment on the Lectures, 55-102 (Hilary Putman); Lecture One: Philosophy and the Conduct of Life, 105-122; Lecture Two: Types of Reasoning, 123-142 [Exordium for Lecture Three], 143-145	Lecture Three: The Logic of Relatives, 146-164; Lecture Four: First Rule of Logic, 165-180; Lecture Five: Training in Reasoning, 181-196; Lecture Six: Causation and Force, 197-217; Lecture Seven: Habit, 218-241; Lecture Eight: The Logic of Continuity, 242-270; Notes, 272-288; Index, 289-297

Lectures on Pragmatism (LOP) and Pragmatism as a Principle and Method of Right Thinking (PPM) (the 1903 Harvard lectures)

- Peirce, C. S., "Lectures on Pragmatism", Cambridge, MA, March 26 – May 17, 1903.
  - Published in part, Collected Papers, CP 5.14–212. Eprint without editorial notes.
  - Published in full with editor's introduction and commentary, Patricia Ann Turisi, ed., Pragmatism as a Principle and Method of Right Thinking: The 1903 Harvard "Lectures on Pragmatism" (PPM or HL), State University of New York Press, Albany, NY, 1997, SUNY catalog page. A study edition of Charles Sanders Peirce's lecture manuscripts which had been previously published in abridged form.
  - Reprinted, pp. 133–241, Peirce Edition Project (eds.), The Essential Peirce, Selected Philosophical Writings, Volume 2 (1893–1913), Indiana University Press, Bloomington, IN, 1998.

Topics of Logic (the 1903 Lowell lectures and syllabus)

- The Syllabus of the 1903 Lowell lectures
  - Peirce, C. S. (1903), manuscript materials associated with the Syllabus, CP 1.180-202, 2.219-226, 2.274-277, 2.283-284, 2.292-294, 2.309-331, CP 3.571-608, CP 4.394-417.
  - Peirce, C. S. (1903), "A Syllabus of Certain Topics of Logic" (Syllabus articles selected by the editors), EP 2:258-330
  - Peirce, C. S. (1903), A Syllabus of Certain Topics of Logic, Alfred Mudge & Son, Boston, 23-page pamphlet printed for the lecture audience: p. 1, title & publication, p. 2, Peirce's 104-word preface; pp. 4–9 are headed "An Outline Classification of the Sciences"; pp. 10–14 are headed "The Ethics of Terminology"; and pp. 15–23 are headed "Existential Graphs".
- Peirce, C. S. (1903 Nov. 23 – Dec. 17), Lowell lectures on "Some Topics of Logic bearing on Questions now Vexed".
  - CP 1.15-26, 1.324, 1.343-349, 1.521-544, 1.591-615, 4.510-529, 5.590-604, 6.88-97, 7.110-130, 7.182n7, 8.176. Eprint of much, including 5.590-604, no bold or italics. At Robin Catalog entry for Logic, scroll down to "LOWELL LECTURES 1903".
  - Lecture I, "What Makes a Reasoning Sound?", EP 2:242-257.

=== Other collections ===
Chance, Love, and Logic: Philosophical Essays (CLL)

- Peirce, C. S., Chance, Love, and Logic: Philosophical Essays edited and introduced by Morris Raphael Cohen, with supplementary essay on the pragmatism of Peirce by John Dewey, Harcourt, Brace and Company, Inc., NY, 1923, and Kegan Paul, Trench, Trubner & Co., London, 1923. Internet Archive Eprint. Reprinted 1956, George Braziller, hardcover, 318 pages. Reprinted 1998 with additional introduction by Kenneth Laine Ketner, University of Nebraska Press, Lincoln, NE, UNP catalog page, 318 pages, paperback (ISBN 978-0-8032-8751-8, ISBN 0-8032-8751-8). Reprinted 2000, under title Chance, Love, and Logic, 386 pages, in series D. Nineteenth and Twentieth Century Anglo-American Philosophy, Routledge, hardcovers (ISBN 978-0415225748, ISBN 0-415-22574-4).

Preface xvii
Introduction [based on 1916 memorial essay on Peirce] ix
Proem: The Rules of Philosophy 1

Part I. Chance and Logic (Illustrations of the Logic of Science.)

1. The Fixation of Belief 7
2. How to Make Our Ideas Clear 32
3. The Doctrine of Chances 61
4. The Probability of Induction 82
5. The Order of Nature 106
6. Deduction, Induction and Hypothesis 131

Part II. Love and Chance

1. The Architecture of Theories 157
2. The Doctrine of Necessity Examined 179
3. The Law of Mind 202
4. Man s Glassy Essence 238
5. Evolutionary Love 267

Supplementary Essay—The Pragmatism of Peirce, by John Dewey 301

Philosophical Writings of Peirce (PWP)

- Peirce, C. S., Philosophical Writings of Peirce, Justus Buchler, ed., first published as The Philosophy of Peirce: Selected Writings, Harcourt, Brace and Company, NY, 1940, 386 pages, and Routledge and Kegan Paul, 1940, 386 pages. Reprinted, Dover, 1955, 386 pages, paperback (ISBN 978-0486202174, ISBN 0-486-20217-8), Dover catalog page. Reprinted, 2000 and 2001, under original title, 404 pages, in series D. Nineteenth and Twentieth Century Anglo-American Philosophy, Routledge, hardcovers (ISBN 978-0415225748, ISBN 0-415-22574-4).

Preface vii
Introduction ix
1. Concerning the Author 1
2. The Fixation of Belief 5
3. How to Make Our Ideas Clear 23
4. The Scientific Attitude and Fallibilism 42
5. Philosophy and the Sciences: A Classification 60
6. The Principles of Phenomenology 74
7. Logic as Semiotic: The Theory of Signs 98
8. The Criterion of Validity in Reasoning 120
9. What is a Leading Principle? 129
10. The Nature of Mathematics 135
11. Abduction and Induction 150
12. On the Doctrine of Chances, with Later Reflections 157
13. The Probability of Induction 174
14. The General Theory of Probable Inference 190
15. Uniformity 218
16. Some Consequences of Four Incapacities 228
17. The Essentials of Pragmatism 251
18. Pragmatism in Retrospect: A Last Formulation 269
19. Critical Common-sensism 290
20. Perceptual Judgments 302
21. Two Notes: on Motives, on Percepts 306
22. The Approach to Metaphysics 310
23. The Architecture of Theories 315
24. The Doctrine of Necessity Examined 324
25. The Law of Mind 339
26. Synechism, Fallibilism, and Evolution 354
27. Evolutionary Love 361
28. The Concept of God 375
Notes 379
Index 381

Charles S. Peirce's letters to Lady Welby

- Peirce, C. S., Charles S. Peirce's letters to Lady Welby, 55 pages, Whitlock's, Inc. for the Graduate Philosophy Club of Yale University, 1953.

Essays in the Philosophy of Science

- Peirce, C. S., Essays in the Philosophy of Science, Vincent Tomas, ed., 271 pages, Liberal Arts Press, New York, NY, 1957, and (in a perhaps separate publication) as #17 of the American Heritage Series, Bobbs-Merrill, Indianapolis, IN, 1957.

Selected Writings (SW)

- Peirce, C. S., Charles S. Peirce: Selected Writings (Values in a Universe of Chance), Philip P. Wiener, ed. First published as Values in a Universe of Chance: Selected Writings of Charles S. Peirce, Stanford University Press, Stanford, CA, 1958, hardcover, xxvi + 446 pages, and by Doubleday and Company, 1958, paperback. Reprinted, Dover Publications, New York, NY, 1966, paperback (ISBN 9780486216348, ISBN 0-486-21634-9) Dover catalog page.

Charles S. Peirce: The Essential Writings

- Peirce, C. S., Charles S. Peirce: The Essential Writings, Edward C. Moore, ed., Harper & Row, 1972, 317 pages, paperback. Reprinted, with new preface by Richard S. Robin, Prometheus Books, Amherst, NY, 1998, 322 pages, paperback (ISBN 978-1573922562, ISBN 1-57392-256-0), Prometheus catalog page. Complete T.O.C. is not available online, but book includes "Questions Concerning Certain Faculties Claimed for Man", "The Fixation of Belief", "How to Make Our Ideas Clear", "The Doctrine of Chances", "A Guess at the Riddle", a review of George Berkeley's works, articles by Peirce in Baldwin's dictionary on uniformity, synechism, and his later pragmatism, and other things.

Peirce on Signs: Writings on Semiotic (PSWS)

- Peirce, C. S., Peirce on Signs: Writings on Semiotic, James Hoopes, ed., paper, 294 pp., University of North Carolina Press, Chapel Hill, NC, 1991, UNCP catalog page, ISBN 978-0-8078-4342-0. Includes, besides the main introduction, separate short introductions also by Hoopes for each of Peirce's writings.

Acknowledgments vii
Introduction 1
1. An Essay on the Limits of Religious Thought Written to Prove That We Can Reason upon the Nature of God 14
2. [A Treatise on Metaphysics] 16
3. On a New List of Categories 23
4. Questions concerning Certain Faculties Claimed for Man 34
5. Some Consequences of Four Incapacities 54
6. Grounds of the Validity of the Laws of Logic: Further Consequences of Four Incapacities 85
7. [Fraser's The Works of George Berkeley] 116
8. On the Nature of Signs 141
9. The Fixation of Belief 144
10. How to Make Our Ideas Clear 160

11. One, Two, Three: Fundamental Categories of Thought and of Nature 180
12. A Guess at the Riddle 186
13. James's Psychology 203
14. Mans Glassy Essence 212
15. Minute Logic 231
16. Sign 239
17. Lectures on Pragmatism 241
18. ["Pragmatism" Defined] 246
19. Prolegomena to an Apology for Pragmaticism 249
20. The Basis of Pragmatism 253
21. A Neglected Argument for the Reality of God 260
Bibliography 279
Index 281

The Logic of Interdisciplinarity: The Monist-series (LI)

Peirce, C. S. (2009), Charles S. Peirce. The Logic of Interdisciplinarity: The Monist-series, Elize Bisanz, editor. Berlin: Akademie Verlag (now de Gruyter), 2009, 455 pp. Print (ISBN 978-3-05-004410-1). Electronic (ISBN 978-3-05-004733-1). In some places the title is ordered differently, the phrase "The Logic of Interdisciplinarity" coming first. German publication of Peirce's works in English. Bisanz's introduction may be in German. Includes "a short biography" by Kenneth Laine Ketner of Peirce actually entitled "Charles Sanders Peirce: Interdisciplinary Scientist" which includes the entire text of Peirce's 1904 manuscript of his intellectual autobiography. Publisher's catalog page (in German). Announcement of the book with table of contents, Google-translated into English, and in the original German (T.O.C. still in English].

=== Dictionary contributions by Peirce ===
==== The Century Dictionary ====
- Whitney, William Dwight, ed. (1889–1891), Century Dictionary (1st ed.), assisted by B. E. Smith. New York: The Century Company. (Note: The Century Dictionary itself is available both online (at no charge) and on CD at http://www.global-language.com/century/)
  - See the Peirce Edition Project (PEP; Université du Québec à Montréal) on Peirce's contributions to the Century Dictionary.

==== (Baldwin) Dictionary of Philosophy and Psychology ====
- Baldwin, James Mark (1901) Dictionary of Philosophy and Psychology 1-3.
  - Peirce contributed numerous definitions, attributed to him as "C. S. P.". For list of Peirce entries in A-O, see (under "External links" on this page) #Peirce's definitions in the Baldwin, where there are also links for viewing the dictionary at online mass archives.

=== Books authored or edited by Peirce, published in his lifetime ===
- Peirce, C. S. (1878), Photometric Researches Made in the Years 1872–1875, Wilhelm Engelmann, Leipzig, Germany, 181 pages. (Additional title page says "Annals of the Astronomical Observatory of Harvard College. Vol. IX. Observations Made under the Direction of the Late Joseph Winlock, A. M., Phillips Professor of Astronomy and Director of the Observatory". Google Book Search Eprint, users outside the US may not yet be able to gain full access. Internet Archive Eprint.
- Peirce, C. S. (1883, ed.), Studies in Logic by Members of the Johns Hopkins University (SIL), Little, Brown, and Company, Boston, MA, 1883. Reprinted: Foundations of Semiotics, Volume 1, Achim Eschbach (series ed. & pref.), Max H. Fisch (intro.), Johns Benjamins, Amsterdam, 1983, 203 pages, hardcover (ISBN 90-272-3271-7, ISBN 90-272-3271-7) JB catalog page. Google Book Search Eprint, users outside the US may not yet be able to gain full access. Internet Archive Eprint.

Contents of Studies in Logic 1883
Charles S. Peirce	Preface	iii–vi
Allan Marquand	"The Logic of the Epicureans" [Arisbe Eprint ]	1-11
Allan Marquand	"A Machine for Producing Syllogistic Variations"	12-15
Allan Marquand	"Note on an Eight-Term Logical Machine"	16
Christine Ladd	"On the Algebra of Logic"	17–71
Oscar Howard Mitchell	"On a New Algebra of Logic"	72–106
B. I. Gilman	"Operations in Relative Number with Applications to the Theory of Probabilities"	107–125
C. S. Peirce	"A Theory of Probable Inference" (Reprinted: CP 2.694–754; W4, 408–450)	126-181
C. S. Peirce	"Note A" ["On a Limited Universe of Marks"] (Revised version in CP 2.517–531)	182–186
C. S. Peirce	"Note B" ["The Logic of Relatives"] (Reprinted: CP 3.328–358; W4:453–466)	187–203

Extractions and pamphlets

- Peirce, C. S. (1867), Three papers on logic: Read before the American Academy of Arts and Sciences, 49 pp. (?), containing "On an Improvement in Boole's Calculus of Logic", "On the Natural Classification of Arguments", and "On a New List of Categories", published as an extraction from Proceedings of the American Academy of the Arts and Sciences v. 7, which in turn was published in 1868.
- Peirce, C. S. (1870), Description of a Notation for the Logic of Relatives, Resulting from an Amplification of the Conceptions of Boole's Calculus of Logic, published as an extraction (Eprint via Google Book Search: users outside the US may not yet be able to gain full access to the book), Welch, Bigelow, and Company for Harvard University (1870), from Memoirs of the American Academy of Arts and Sciences, v. 9, pp. 317–378. Reprinted (CP 3.45–149), (W 2:359–429).
- Peirce, C. S. (1903), A Syllabus of Certain Topics of Logic, Alfred Mudge & Son, Boston, 23-page pamphlet printed for the audience at his 1903 Lowell lecture series. See under "Topics of Logic".

=== Articles by Peirce, published in his lifetime ===
This list includes mainly published philosophical and logical works of some note. Papers by Peirce in many fields were published and he wrote over 300 reviews for The Nation. Sometimes an article below is shown after a special series, but was published during the series. Also note a complicating fact of Peirce scholarship, that Peirce sometimes made significant later corrections, modifications, and comments, for which one needs to consult such works as CP, W, EP, and the (online) Commens Dictionary of Peirce's Terms.

NB: Links in this section embedded in page numbers and edition numbers are through Google Book Search. Users outside the US may not yet be able to gain full access to those linked editions. The other links such as to PEP and Arisbe do not go to Google Book Search. Internet Archive links generally go to book's relevant page; once there, click on book's title at pane's top for other formats (pdf, plaintext, and so forth; unfortunately, Internet Archive fails to inform reader about that).

Publishers of journals with multiple articles by Peirce (when not too varied in name or fact):

- American Journal of Mathematics. Baltimore: The Johns Hopkins Press.
- Popular Science Monthly. Before 1900, New York: D. Appleton & Company. 1901, New York and London: McClure, Philips and Company.
- The Monist. Chicago: The Open Court Publishing Company, for the Hegeler Institute.
- The Open Court. Chicago: The Open Court Publishing Company, for the Hegeler Institute.

==== Articles ====
- (1863 January), "The Chemical Theory of Interpenetration", American Journal of Sciences and Arts, Second Series, v. XXXV (published May), No. CIII (January), New Haven: Editors, pp. 78–82. Reprinted (W 1:95–100). Article dated December 1862. Combines chemical and philosophical considerations. Peirce's first published professional paper, according to the bibliography by Burks in CP 8.
- (1864 April), with Noyes, John Buttrick, "Shakespearian Pronunciation", North American Review v. 98, n. 203, Boston: Crosby & Nichols, pp. 342-369. Brent (1998) called it instrumental in Peirce's developing theory of signs. A review of works by George P. Marsh, Richard Grant White, and George L. Craik. Reprinted (W 1:117-143, for some reason with title in brackets, though the title appears in the N.A.R. table of contents and atop the article's pages). See CP 8 bibliography about the authorship of the unsigned article.
- (1867), The Proceedings of the American Academy of Arts and Sciences (PAAAS) series. Peirce delivered these papers (the first three orally) in 1867 to the Academy, which published them in 1868; their date is usually given as 1867. Peirce got offprints of the first three bound together as Three Papers on Logic in 1867 and distributed them. PAAAS v. 7. Internet Archive Eprint.
  - (1867), "On an Improvement in Boole's Calculus of Logic", PAAAS 7, pp. 250–261. Presented March 12, 1867. Reprinted (CP 3.1–19), (W 2:12–23).
  - (1867), "On the Natural Classification of Arguments", PAAAS 7, pp. 261-287. Presented April 9, 1867. Reprinted (CP 2.461–516), (W 2:23–49).
  - (1867), "On a New List of Categories", PAAAS 7, pp. 287–298. Presented May 14, 1867. Reprinted (CP 1.545–559), (W 2:49–59, PEP Eprint), (EP 1:1–10), (PSWS 23–33). Arisbe Eprint. Peirce's seminal philosophical work.
  - (1867), "Upon the Logic of Mathematics", PAAAS 7, pp. 402–412. Presented September 10, 1867. Reprinted (CP 3.20–44), (W 2:59–69).
  - (1867), "Upon Logical Comprehension and Extension", PAAAS 7, pp. 416-432. Presented November 13, 1867. Reprinted (CP 2.391–426), (W 2:70–86, PEP Eprint).
- (1867 July), Review of John Venn's The Logic of Chance, North American Review 105, Boston: Ticknor & Fields, pp. 317-21. Reprinted (CP 8.1–6), (W 2:98–203, PEP Eprint). Internet Archive Eprint.
- (1868–1869), The Journal of Speculative Philosophy (JSP) series in v. II, St. Louis, Mo.: George Knapp & Co., printers and binders.
  - (1868), "Nominalism versus Realism", JSP v. II, n. 1, pp. 57-61. Reprinted (CP 6.619-624), (W 2:144-153, PEP Eprint).
  - (1868), "Questions concerning certain Faculties claimed for Man", JSP v. II, n. 2, pp. 103-114. Reprinted (CP 5.213-263 ), (SW 15–38), (W 2:193–211), (EP 2:11–27), (PSWS 34–53). Arisbe Eprint
  - (1868), "Some Consequences of Four Incapacities", JSP v. II, n. 3, pp. 140–157. Reprinted (CP 5.264–317), (PWP 228–250), (SW 39–72), (W 2:211–242), (EP 1:28–55), (PSWS 54–84). Arisbe Eprint. NB. Misprints in CP and Eprint copy.
  - (1868), "What is Meant by 'Determined'", JSP v. II, n. 3, pp. 190–191. Reprinted (CP 6.625–630), (W 2:155–157, PEP Eprint).
  - (1869), "Grounds of Validity of the Laws of Logic: Further Consequences of Four Incapacities", JSP v. II, n. 4, pp. 193-208. Reprinted (CP 5.318–357), (W 2:242–272, PEP Eprint), (EP 1:56–82).
- (1869 March 18), "Professor Porter's Human Intellect", The Nation 8, 211-213. Reprinted (CN 1:23–39), (W 2:273–381, PEP Eprint).
- (1869 November 25), "The English Doctrine of Ideas", The Nation 9, 461-462. Reprinted (CN 1:32–37), (W 2:302–309, PEP Eprint).
- (1870), "Description of a Notation for the Logic of Relatives, Resulting from an Amplification of the Conceptions of Boole's Calculus of Logic", Memoirs of the American Academy of Arts and Sciences 9 (1870), 317–378. Also published separately as an extraction (title page) by Welch, Bigelow, and Company for Harvard University (1870). Reprinted (CP 3.45–149), (W 2:359–429).
- (1870 April), Review of Henry James, Sr.'s The Secret of Swedenborg, North American Review 110, Boston: Fields, Osgood, & Co., pp. 463-468. Reprinted (W 2:433-438, PEP Eprint).
- (1870/1873), "Appendix No. 21. On the Theory of Errors of Observation", Report of the Superintendent of the United States Coast Survey Showing the Progress of the Survey During the Year 1870, pp. 200–224. Coast Survey Report submitted February 18, 1871, published 1873 by the U.S. Government Printing Office, Washington, D.C. Reports 1837–1965. NOAA PDF Eprint (goes to 1870 Report's p. 200, PDF's p. 215). Reprinted (W 3:140-160).
- (1871 October), Review of Fraser's The Works of George Berkeley, North American Review 113, Boston: James R. Osgood & Co., pp. 449-72. Reprinted (CP 8.7-38), (W2:462-486), (PSWS 116-140). PEP Eprint.
- (1876/1879), "Appendix No. 14. Note on the Theory of the Economy of Research", Report of the Superintendent of the United States Coast Survey Showing the Progress of the Survey for Fiscal Year Ending with June 1876, pp. 197–201, Coast Survey Report submitted December 19, 1876, published 1879 by the U.S. Government Printing Office, Washington, D.C. NOAA PDF Eprint, goes to 1876 Report's p. 197, PDF's p. 222. Reports 1837–1965. Reprinted (CP 7.139–157) and in Operations Research v. 15, n. 4, July–August 1967, pp. 643–648, abstract at JSTOR, doi:10.1287/opre.15.4.643.
- (1877/1879/1880), "Appendix No. 15. A Quincuncial Projection of the Sphere", Report of the Superintendent of the United States Coast Survey Showing the Progress of the Survey for Fiscal Year Ending with June 1877, pp. 191–194 followed by 25 progress sketches, including (25th) the illustration (the map itself). Full Report submitted to the Senate December 26, 1877, and published 1880 (see further below; see also Peirce quincuncial projection).
  —Article first published December 1879, American Journal of Mathematics v. 2, n. 4, pp. 394–397 (without the sketches except final map), Google Books Eprint (Google version of map is partly botched), JSTOR Eprint (free), doi:10.2307/2369491. AJM version reprinted in W 4:68–71.
  —Article reprinted 1880 including publication of all sketches, in the full Report, by the U.S. Government Printing Office, Washington, D.C. NOAA PDF Eprint, link goes to Peirce's article on Report's p. 191, PDF's p. 215. NOAA's PDF lacks the sketches and map. Google Books Eprint (Google botched the sketches and partly botched the illustration (the map itself).) Note: Other Google edition of 1877 Coast Survey Report completely omits the pages of sketches including the illustration (the map).
- (1877–1878), "Illustrations of the Logic of Science" (series), Popular Science Monthly, vols. 12–13:
  - (1877 November), "The Fixation of Belief", Popular Science Monthly, v. 12, pp. 1–15. Reprinted (CLL 7–31), (CP 5.358–387), (PWP 5–22), (SW 91–112), (W 3:242–257), (EP 1:109–123), (PSWS 144–159). Eprint. Internet Archive Eprint.
  - (1878 January), "How to Make Our Ideas Clear", Popular Science Monthly, v. 12, pp. 286–302. Reprinted (CLL 32–60), (CP 5.388–410), (PWP 23–41), (SW 113–136), (W 3:257–276), (EP 1:124–141), (PSWS 160–179). Arisbe Eprint. Internet Archive Eprint.
  - (1878 March), "The Doctrine of Chances", Popular Science Monthly, v. 12, March issue, pp. 604–615. Reprinted (CLL 61-81), (CP 2.645-668), (W 3:276-290), (EP 1:142-154). Internet Archive Eprint. Selections plus CP 2.661-668 and CP 2.758, published as "The Doctrine of Chances With Later Reflections", PWP 157-173.
  - (1878 April), "The Probability of Induction", Popular Science Monthly, v. 12, pp. 705–718. Reprinted (CLL 82-105), (CP 2.669-693), (PWP 174-189), (EP 1:155-169). Internet Archive Eprint.
  - (1878 June), "The Order of Nature", Popular Science Monthly, v. 13, pp. 203–217. Reprinted (CLL 106-130), (CP 6.395-427), (EP 1:170-185). Internet Archive Eprint.
  - (1878 August), "Deduction, Induction, and Hypothesis", Popular Science Monthly, v. 13, pp. 470–482. Reprinted (CLL 131-156), (CP 2.619-644), (EP 1:186-199). Internet Archive Eprint.
- (1880), "On the Algebra of Logic", American Journal of Mathematics v. 3, n. 1, pp. 15-57. JSTOR eprint (free). Reprinted (W 4:163-208).
- (1881), "On the Logic of Number", American Journal of Mathematics v. 4, n. 1, pp. 85-95. JSTOR (free). Reprinted with a correction (CP 3.252-288), (W 4:299-309).
- (1881), "On the Relative Forms of the Algebras", Addendum II in Peirce, Benjamin, "Linear Associative Algebra", American Journal of Mathematics v. 4, pp. 221-226, republished 1882 as Linear Associative Algebra with the addenda and notes by C. S. Peirce (title page) D. Van Nostrand, New York, 133 pages, pp. 125-129.
- (1881), "On the Algebras in which Division is Unambiguous", Addendum III in Peirce, Benjamin, "Linear Associative Algebra", American Journal of Mathematics v. 4, pp. 226-229, republished 1882 as Linear Associative Algebra with the addenda and notes by C. S. Peirce, D. Van Nostrand, New York, 133 pages, pp. 129-133.
- (1882), "Introductory Lecture on the Study of Logic", Johns Hopkins University Circulars 2:19, November, pp. 11-12. Reprinted (W 4:378-382). Internet Archive Eprint.
- (1883), "A Theory of Probable Inference", Studies in Logic, Boston: Little, Brown, and Company, pp. 126-181. Reprinted (CP 2.694-754),(W 4:408-453).
  - "Note A" ["On a Limited Universe of Marks"], pp. 182-186 (Revised version in CP 2.517-531).
  - "Note B" ["The Logic of Relatives"] pp. 187-203. Reprinted (CP 3.328-358), (W4:453-466).
- and Jastrow, Joseph (1884), "On Small Differences in Sensation", Memoirs of the National Academy of Sciences (1884/1885), 3, 73-83, Presented 17 October 1884. Eprint. Reprinted (with corrections and later reflections, CP 7.21-35).
- (1884/1885), "On the Algebra of Logic: A Contribution to the Philosophy of Notation", two parts, first part published 1885 in American Journal of Mathematics v. 7, n. 2, pp. 180–202. JSTOR eprint (free). Presented at least in part, National Academy of Sciences, Newport, RI, 14–17 Oct 1884. 1885 is the date usually given for this work. Reprinted (CP 3.359–403), (W 5:162–190), (EP 1:225–228, in part).
- (1885/1886), [Testimony on the Organization of the Coast Survey], given January 24, 1885, Miscellaneous Documents of the Senate of the U. S. 82, 1886. Printed in Testimony before the Joint Commission to Consider the Present Organization of the Signal Service, Geological Survey, Coast and Geodetic Survey, and the Hydrographic Office of the Navy Department ... (etc.), Washington Government Printing Office, 1886, pp. 370–378 (49th Congress, 1st Session, Senate, Mis. Doc. No. 82). Reprinted (W 5:149–161).
- (1886 February 11), "Dr. F.E. Abbot's Philosophy" (review of Francis Ellingwood Abbot's Organic Scientific Philosophy: Scientific Theism), The Nation v. 42, n. 1076, New York: The Evening Post Publishing Company, pp. 135-136, reprinted (CN 1:71–74), (W 5:285-289). Arisbe Eprint.
- (1887 December), in Proceedings of the American Society for Psychical Research, v. I, Boston: Damrell and Upham,
  - "Criticism on Phantasms of the Living: An Examination of an Argument of Messrs. Gurney, Myers, and Podmore", n. 3, pp. 150-157. Reprinted (W 6:74–81). Followed by a response by Gurney, Edmund, "Remarks on Professor Peirce's Paper", pp. 157-179.
  - "Mr. Peirce's Rejoinder", still in n. 3, pp. 180-215. Reprinted (W 6, pp. 101–141). Followed (1889 March) by a response by Gurney, Edmund, "Remarks on Mr. Peirce's Rejoinder", n. 4, pp. 286-300, followed by W. H. Myers, Frederic, "Postscript to Professor Gurney's Reply to Mr. Peirce", pp. 300-301.
- (1887), ["Science and Immortality"], first published in a Symposium in the Christian Register, Boston, April 7, 1887, reprinted with revisions as "Contribution XX" in Science and Immortality: The Christian Register Symposium, Revised and Enlarged, Samuel J. Barrows, ed., Boston: Geo. H. Ellis, pp. 69–76, which was reprinted as "Science and Immortality" (CP 6.548–556). See CP 8 bibliography. Max Fisch said (1986, p. 229) that it includes Peirce's first argument in print against necessitarianism.
- (1887 November), "Logical Machines", The American Journal of Psychology v. 1, n. 1, Baltimore: N. Murray, pp. 165-170.
- (1891 November 12), "Abbot against Royce" (letter), The Nation v. 53, n. 1376, New York: The Evening Post Publishing Company, p. 372. Reprinted (CN 1:115-117), (W 8:436-348).
  —Peirce wrote the above in support of Abbot, Francis E. (1891), Professor Royce's libel, public letter dated October 1, 1891, published as book, Boston: G. H. Ellis, Internet Archive Eprint, which Abbot wrote in response to Royce, Josiah (1890 October), "Dr. Abbot's 'Way Out of Agnosticism", International Journal of Ethics v. 1, n. 1, Philadelphia: International Journal of Ethics and London: T. Fisher Unwin, pp. 98-113.
  —Responses to Peirce's letter: one by James, William (1891 November 19), "Abbot against Royce" (dated November 15, 1891), The Nation, v. 53, n. 1377, pp. 387-388, reprinted (CN 1:118-120), and one by Warner, Joseph Bangs (1891 November 26), "The Suppression of Dr. Abbot's Reply" (dated November 20, 1891), The Nation v. 53, n. 1378, p. 408, reprinted (CN 1:120-122). In response to Warner: Abbot, Francis E. (1891 December 3), "Mr. Warner's 'Evidence in Full' Completed" (dated November 28, 1891), The Nation v. 53, n. 1379, p. 426, reprinted (CN 1:125-127).
- (1891–1893), The Monist Metaphysical Series, in The Monist v. I, v. II, and v. III.
  - (1891), "The Architecture of Theories", The Monist, v. I, n. 2, January, pp. 161-176. Oxford PDF. Internet Archive Eprint. Reprinted (CLL 157-178), (CP 6.7-34), (PWP 315-323), (SW 142-159), (EP 1:285-297), (LI 58-69), (W 8:89-110).
  - (1892 April) "The Doctrine of Necessity Examined", The Monist, v. II, n. 3, pp. 321-337. Oxford PDF. Internet Archive Eprint. Reprinted (CP 6.35-65), (PWP 324-338), (EP 1:298-311), (LI 70-81), (W 8:111-125). Followed in July by a response by the editor Carus, Paul, "Mr. Charles S. Peirce's Onslaught on the Doctrine of Necessity" v. II, n. 4, pp. 560–582; Internet Archive Eprint.
  - (1892 July) "The Law of Mind", The Monist, v. II, n. 4, pp. 533-559. Oxford PDF. Internet Archive Eprint. Reprinted (CLL 202-237), (CP 6:102-163), (PWP 339-360), (EP 1:312-333), (LI 82-101), (W 8:135-157). Criticized by George M. McCrie in "The Issues of 'Synechism' ", The Monist v. III, n. 3, 1903 April, pp. 380-401; Oxford PDF.
  - (1892 October), "Man's Glassy Essence", The Monist, v. III, n. 1, pp. 1-22. Oxford PDF. Internet Archive Eprint. Reprinted (CLL 238-266), (CP 6.238-271), (EP 1:334-351), (PSWS 212-230), (LI 102-116), (W 8:165-183), (in part, and with long introductory note by editor, PMSW 141-153).
  - (1893 January), "Evolutionary Love", The Monist, v. III, n. 2, pp. 176-200. Oxford PDF. Internet Archive Eprint. Reprinted (CLL 267-300), (CP 6.287-317), (PWP 361-374), (EP 1:352-372), (LI 117-135), (W 8:124-205). Arisbe Eprint.
  - (1893 July), "Reply to the Necessitarians", The Monist, v. III, n. 4, pp. 526-570. Oxford PDF. Internet Archive Eprint. Reprinted (CP 6.588-618), (LI 136-169). Followed in same issue by a response by Carus, Paul, "The Founder of Tychism, His Methods, Philosophy, and Criticisms: In Reply to Mr. Charles S. Peirce", pp. 571–622; Oxford PDF; Internet Archive Eprint.
- (1892–1893), The Open Court series.
  - (1892 September 8), "Pythagorics", The Open Court, v. VI—36, n. 263, pp. 3375–3377. Reprinted (HP 1:557-562). Internet Archive Eprint. Arisbe HTML Eprint. Arisbe Word-doc Eprint.
  - (1892 September 22), "The Critic of Arguments. I. Exact Thinking", The Open Court, v. VI—38, n. 265, pp. 3391–3394. Internet Archive Eprint. Reprinted CP 3.404-415.
  - (1892 September 29), "Dmesis" [Taming], The Open Court, v. VI—39, n. 266, 3399–3402. Internet Archive Eprint. Arisbe Eprint. Peirce's "modestly suggested" treatment of criminals: in the Christian spirit, transform all prisons into lavish rehabilitation facilities full of kindness and cultural resources, but, since rehabilitation of habitual criminals is a cause with little hope, make their confinement generally permanent.
  - (1892 October 13), "The Critic of Arguments. II. The Reader is Introduced to Relatives", The Open Court, v. VI—41, n. 268, pp. 3415–3418. Internet Archive Eprint. Reprinted (CP 3.415-424).
  - (1893 February 16), "The Marriage of Religion and Science", The Open Court, v. VII—7, n. 286, pp. 3559–3560. Internet Archive Eprint. Reprinted (CP6.428-434).
  - (1893 July 27), "What Is Christian Faith?", The Open Court, v. VII—30, n. 309, pp. 3743–3745. Internet Archive Eprint. Reprinted (CP 7.435-448).
- (1896 October), "The Regenerated Logic", The Monist, v. VII, n. 1, pp. 19-40. Oxford PDF. Internet Archive Eprint. Reprinted (CP 3.425-455), (LI 170-185), (in part, PMSW 11-14).
- (1897 January), "The Logic of Relatives", The Monist, v. VII, n. 2 pp. 161-217. Oxford PDF. Internet Archive Eprint. Reprinted (CP 3.456-552), (LI 186-229).
- (1898 March), "The Logic of Mathematics in Relation to Education" in Educational Review v. XV, March issue, New York: Henry Holt and Company, pp. 209–216. Internet Archive Eprint. Reprinted (CP 3.553-562), (PMSW 15-21).
- (1901 January 12), "The Century's Great Men in Science", The New York Evening Post. Reprinted 1901 in The 19th Century: A Review of Progress during the Past One Hundred Years in the Chief Departments of Human Activity, New York and London: G. P. Putnam's Sons: the Knickerbocker Press, 494 pages, pp. 312-322. Reprinted in SW.
- (1901 January), "Pearson's Grammar of Science", Popular Science Monthly v. 58, n. 3, pp. 296-306. Reprinted (CP 8.132-156), (EP 2:57–66).
- (1905 April), "What Pragmatism Is", The Monist, v. XV, n. 2, pp. 161–181. Oxford PDF. Reprinted (CP 5.411–437), (SW 180–202), (LI 230–244). Internet Archive Eprint. Arisbe Eprint.
- (1905 October), "Issues of Pragmaticism", The Monist, v. XV, n. 4, pp. 481-499 (this and another Google copy botch two pages). Oxford PDF. Internet Archive Eprint. Reprinted (CP 5.438-463), (SW 203-226), (LI 245-258).
- (1906, 1910), "Peirce, C(harles) S", American Men of Science, p. 248. Information supplied by Peirce on his degrees and his fields of research, possibly first written in 1903 (cf. Robin Catalog MS 1611). Second Edition (sometimes called Volume 2) 1910, p. 364, "Peirce, C(harles) S(antiago Sanders)", with a few variations in the text; this is the version quoted by Ketner in 1995 and 2009.
- (1906 January), "Mr. Peterson's Proposed Discussion", The Monist, v. XVI, n. 1, pp. 147-151. Oxford PDF. Reprinted (CP 5.610-614), (LI 287-290). Corrections published in v. XVI n. 2, p. 320, Oxford PDF, ("... on page 149, line 25, the last word should read "definitive" instead of 'definite.' ")
- (1906 October), "Prolegomena To an Apology For Pragmaticism", The Monist, v. XVI, n. 4, pp. 492-546; Oxford PDF; some corrections in The Monist v. XVII, n. 1, 1907 January, p. 160; Oxford PDF. Reprinted (CP 4.530-572), (PSWP 249-252), (LI 307-342), (in part, PMSW 79-83). Eprint.
- (1908), "A Neglected Argument for the Reality of God", published in part, Hibbert Journal v. 7, pp. 90–112, Internet Archive Eprint. Reprinted including unpublished part (CP 6.452-485), (SW 358-379), (EP 2:434-450), (PSWS 260-278), Eprint.
- (1908 April), "Some Amazing Mazes", The Monist, v. XVIII, n. 2, pp. 227-241. Oxford PDF Internet Archive Eprint. Reprinted (CP 4.585-593), (LI 394-403). Monist editor Paul Carus asked Francis C. Russell to write a "popular digest" of Peirce's article, so Russell wrote "Hints for the Elucidation of Mr. Peirce's Logical Work", The Monist v. XVIII, n. 3, 1908 July, pp. 406-415. Oxford PDF.
- (1908 May), "A Letter from Mr. Peirce", The Open Court, v. XXII, (No. 5), May, NO. 624, p. 319, in response to "Problems of Modern Theology" in v. XXII, n. 4, pp. 234-246 by Paul Carus (The Open Court's editor).
- (1908 July), "Some Amazing Mazes (Conclusion), Explanation of Curiosity the First", The Monist, v. XVIII, n. 3, pp. 416-464. Oxford PDF. Internet Archive Eprint. Reprinted (CP 4.594-642), (LI 404-445) (the "Note" and the "Addition", PMSW 211-219).
- (1909 January), "Some Amazing Mazes, A Second Curiosity", The Monist, v. XIX, n. 1, pp. 36-45. Oxford PDF. Internet Archive Eprint. Reprinted (CP 4.643-646), (LI 446-451).
- (1910 January), in The Monist, v. XX, n. 1,
  - Passage, from letter to Francis C. Russell, and quoted on p. 45 in Carus, Paul, "On the Nature of Logical and Mathematical Thought", pp. 33–75. Oxford PDF. Internet Archive p. 45.
  - Added explanatory note (about passage from letter to Francis C. Russell), quoted on pp. 158-159 in Carus, Paul, "Non-Aristotelian Logic", pp. 158–159. Oxford PDF. Internet Archive Eprint.

=== Drafts and manuscripts subsequently published ===
- (1867), From Peirce's logic notebook, MS 140: March–December 1867, W 2:1–11, PEP Eprint.
- (1867), "Chapter I. One, Two, and Three" (fragment), MS 144: summer-fall 1867, W 2:103–104, PEP Eprint.
- (1867–1868), "Critique of Positivism" (editors' title), MS 146: Winter 1867–1868, W 2:122–131, PEP Eprint.
- (1868), "Questions on Reality", MS 148: Winter-Spring 1868. W 2:162-186, PEP Eprint.
- (1868), "Potentia ex Impotentia", MS 149: Summer 1868, W 2:187-191, PEP Eprint.
- (1868), Letter, Peirce to W. T. Harris, Cambridge MA 1868 Nov. 30. L 183: W. T. Harris Collection. W 2:192, PEP Eprint.
- (1869–1870), MS material toward a textbook of logic
  - (1869) "Preliminary Sketch of Logic", MS 154, W 2:294-297, PEP Eprint.
  - (1869–70) "Lessons in Practical Logic", MS 164, W 2:345-349, PEP Eprint.
  - (1869–70) "A Practical Treatise on Logic and Methodology", MS 165, W 2:350, PEP Eprint.
  - (1869–70) "Rules for Investigation", MS 165, W 2:351-352, PEP Eprint.
  - (1869–70) "Practical Logic", MS 165, W 2:353–355, PEP Eprint.
  - (1869–70) "Chapter 2", MS 166, W 2:356–358, PEP Eprint.
  - (1870) "A System of Logic", MS 169, W 2:4300–432, PEP Eprint.
  - (1870 spring) "Notes for Lectures on Logic to be given 1st term 1870–71", MS 171, W 2:439–440, PEP Eprint.
- (1872 fall), "[On Reality]", MS 194, W 3:28ff, Arisbe Eprint.
- (1886), "Qualitative Logic", MS 582, W 5:323–371.
- (1886), "The Logic of Relatives: Qualitative and Quantitative", MS 584, CP 5.372–378.
- (c. 1886), "Qualitative Logic" MS 736, NEM 4:101–115.
- (c. 1886–1889), "[Reasoning]", W 6:354-356. Arisbe Eprint.
- (1893), "The Categories" MS 403, a later version of most of the 1867 paper "On a New List of Categories". Arisbe "Eprint" (PDF). (177 KiB) interleaved with the 1867 "New List" for comparison.
- (c. 1894), "What Is a Sign?", MS 404; partly in CP 2.281, 285, 297-302; EP 2:4–10. PEP Eprint.
- (c. 1896), "The Logic of Mathematics; An Attempt to Develop My Categories from Within". CP 1.417–519. Eprint
- (1887–1888), "A Guess at the Riddle", MS 909; CP 1.354, 1.1–2, 1.355–368, 1.373–375, 1.379–383, 1.385–416; The Essential Writings (pp. ?); EP 1:245–279; PSWS 186–202; W 6:165–210. Arisbe Eprint.
- (1899), "F. R. L." [First Rule of Logic], unpaginated manuscript, c. 1899, CP 1.135–140. Eprint
- (1901) "On the Logic of Drawing History from Ancient Documents, Especially from Testimonies". CP 7.164–231, HP 2:705–762, and (first half) EP 2:75–114.
- (1902), "Application of C. S. Peirce to the Executive Committee of the Carnegie Institution" (1902 July 15), partly published in "Parts of Carnegie Application" (L75), NEM 4:13–73.
- (1902), "MS L75: Logic, Regarded As Semeiotic (The Carnegie application of 1902): Version 1: An Integrated Reconstruction", Joseph Ransdell, ed., Arisbe Eprint. Includes entirety of Manuscript L75, with labeled draft versions interpolated into the final submission of July 1902. Version 1 completed, 1998.
- (1902), "The Simplest Mathematics", MS dated January–February 1902, intended as Chapter 3 of the projected Minute Logic, CP 4.227–323.
- (c. 1904), "Καινα στοιχεια" ("New Elements"), MS 517, NEM 4:235–263. Cf. "New Elements", EP 2:300–324. Arisbe Eprint.
- (1904), Intellectual autobiography in draft letter L 107 (see the Robin Catalog) to Matthew Mattoon Curtis. Published 1983 in "A Brief Intellectual Autobiography by Charles Sanders Peirce" by Kenneth Laine Ketner in American Journal of Semiotics v. 2, nos. 1–2 (1983), 61–83. Some or all of it is in pp. 26–31 in Classical American Philosophy: Essential Readings and Interpretive Essays, John J. Stuhr, ed., Oxford University Press, US, 1987. L 107 and MS 914 are in "Charles Sanders Peirce: Interdisciplinary Scientist" (first page at Oldenbourg) by Kenneth Laine Ketner in the 2009 Peirce collection Logic of Interdisciplinarity.
- (1909), "Existential Graphs", MS 514. Eprint of "Existential Graphs MS 514 by Charles Sanders Peirce with commentary by John F. Sowa", that page last modified 23 Jul 2005.

== Secondary literature ==
The Transactions of the Charles S. Peirce Society, quarterly since spring 1965, contains many Peirce-related articles, most of them not listed anywhere below, and their Website has a grand table of contents for all issues (T.O.C.).

=== Bibliographic resources for secondary literature ===
- Fisch, Max
  - (1964), "A Draft of a bibliography of Writings about C. S. Peirce" in Studies in the Philosophy of C. S. Peirce, Second Series, E. Moore and R. S. Robin, eds., University of Massachusetts Press, Amherst, MA, 1964, pp. 486–514.
  - (1966), "A First Supplement to 'A Draft of a bibliography of Writings about C. S. Peirce'", Transactions of the Charles S. Peirce Society, v. 2, n. 1, spring.
  - (1974), "Supplements to the Peirce Bibliographies", Transactions of the Charles S. Peirce Society, v. 10, n. 2, spring.
- Grupo de Estudios Peirceanos (GEP) (2006), "Bibliografía Peirceana (2006)", GEP (Jaime Nubiola, dir.), University of Navarra, Spain. Huge, and plenty both in English and in other languages. Eprint.
- Kloesel, Christian J. W. and Ransdell, Joseph (1977), "Secondary Bibliography" in A Comprehensive Bibliography and Index of the Published Works of Charles Sanders Peirce, with a Bibliography of Secondary Studies, Ketner, Kenneth Laine et al., eds. Second edition A Comprehensive Bibliography of the Published Works of Charles Sanders Peirce, revised by Ketner et al., Philosophy Documentation Center, Bowling Green, OH, 1986, 337 pages, hardcover (ISBN 978-0912632841, ISBN 0-912632-84-4). Online via InteLex. Very extensive secondary bibliography for up till some time in 1977. (See above for more information.)
- Peirce Edition Project Editors, Newsletter Booknotes
  - Vol. 2, No. 1, summer 1995 Booknotes.
  - Vol. 2, No. 2, winter 1995–1996 Booknotes.
  - Vol. 3, No. 1, winter 1999 "Booknotes" (PDF). Archived from the original (PDF) on 2007-04-24. (1.84 MiB).
  - Vol. 3, No. 2, fall 2000 "Booknotes" (PDF). Archived from the original (PDF) on 2007-04-24. (27.1 KiB).
  - Vol. 4, No. 1, spring 2001 Booknotes
- Philpapers: Charles Sanders Peirce. Eprint.
- Ransdell, Joseph (ongoing) "Dissertations On Peirce: with abstracts (when available)", Arisbe, Joseph Ransdell, site owner, Lubbock, TX, Arisbe Eprint.
- Shook, John R. (ongoing), the Pragmatism Cybrary
  - "Dissertations on Pragmatism" [from 1896 onward] Eprint
  - Books and Journal Issues about Pragmatism: 1990–1999, 2000–2009, (often with tables of contents from anthologies and journal issues).
- Shook, John R. (1998), Pragmatism. An Annotated Bibliography 1898–1940., Rodopi, Amsterdam, the Netherlands and Atlanta, GA, 1998, 617 pp. With contributions by E. Paul Colella, Lesley Friedman, Frank X. Ryan and Ignas K. Skrupskelis. Hardcover, (ISBN 978-90-420-0269-2, ISBN 90-420-0269-7), Rodopi catalog page.

=== Journals ===
- Transactions of the Charles S. Peirce Society. (TCSPS) Quarterly since spring 1965. Website. Articles, essays, notes, and book reviews. Most of the contents are not listed in the sections below. Their Website has a grand Table of Contents for all issues (T.O.C.). (For book reviews before fall 1997 one must download their spreadsheet).

==== Semiotics ====
- American Journal of Semiotics, André de Tienne, Editor, & Jamin Pelkey, Managing Editor—from the Semiotic Society of America.
- Applied Semiotics / Sémiotique appliquée (AS/SA) , Peter G. Marteinson & Pascal G. Michelucci, Editors.
- Approaches to Applied Semiotics (2000–2009 book series), Thomas Sebeok et al., Editors.
- Approaches to Semiotics (1969–97 book series), Thomas A. Sebeok, Alain Rey, Roland Posner, et al., Editors.
- Biosemiotics, Marcello Barbieri, Editor-in-Chief—from the International Society for Biosemiotic Studies.
- Center for Semiotics, Aarhus University, Denmark.
- Cognitive Semiotics, Per Aage Brandt & Todd Oakley, editors-in-chief.
- Cybernetics and Human Knowing, Søren Brier, chief editor.
- International Journal of Signs and Semiotic Systems (IJSSS), Angelo Loula & João Queiroz, Editors.
- Open Semiotics Resource Center. Journals, lecture courses, etc.
- The Public Journal of Semiotics, Paul Bouissac, wditor in chief; Alan Cienki, associate editor; René Jorna, Winfried Nöth.
- S.E.E.D. Journal (Semiotics, Evolution, Energy, and Development) (2001–7), Edwina Taborsky, Editor—from SEE.
- The Semiotic Review of Books , Gary Genosko, general editor; Paul Bouissac, founding editor.
- Semiotica, Stéphanie Walsh-Matthews, Chief Editor—from the International Association for Semiotic Studies.
- Semiotiche, Gian Paolo Caprettini, managing director; Andrea Valle & Miriam Visalli, Editors. Some articles in English. Home site seems gone from Web, old url no longer good, and Wayback Machine cannot retrieve.
- Semiotics, Communication and Cognition (book series), Paul Cobley & Kalevi Kull, Editors.
- SemiotiX New Series: A Global Information Bulletin, Paul Bouissac et al.
- Sign Systems Studies, Kalevi Kull, Kati Lindstrom, Mihhail Lotman, Timo Maran, Silvi Salupere, Peeter Torop, Editors—from the Dept. of Semiotics, U. of Tartu, Estonia.
- Signs and Society, Richard J. Parmentier, Editor.
- Signs: International Journal of Semiotics. Martin Thellefsen, Torkild Thellefsen, & Bent Sørensen, chief eds.
- Tartu Semiotics Library (book series), Peeter Torop, Kalevi Kull, Silvi Salupere, Editors.
- Versus: Quaderni di studi semiotici, founded by Umberto Eco.

==== Pragmatism ====
- Contemporary Pragmatism, journal of the International Pragmatism Society. Mitchell Aboulafia and John Shook, eds. Editions Rodopi.
- European Journal of Pragmatism and American Philosophy. Rosa M. Calcaterra, Roberto Frega, and Giovanni Maddalena, main editors. Connected with the Associazione Culturale Pragma.
- Nordic Studies in Pragmatism, Mats Bergman & Henrik Rydenfelt, General Editors. Journal of the Nordic Pragmatism Network.

=== Overviews and biographies ===
==== Articles 1914–1934 ====
- Anonymous (1914 April 23), "Charles S. S. Peirce", The Nation v. 98, n. 2547, p. 473. Obituary. Google Books Eprint.
- Franklin, Fabian (1914 April 30), "The Lonely Heights of Science", The Nation v. 98, n. 2548, pp. 489–490. Google Books Eprint. Attributed to Franklin by the Comprehensive Bibliography.
- Jastrow, Joseph (1914 May 14), "The Passing of a Master Mind", The Nation v. 98, n. 2550, p. 571. Letter dated May 6. Google Books Eprint.
- Peirce, Herbert Henry David and Ellis, Helen Huntington Peirce (1914 May 16), "Charles Sanders Peirce", Boston Evening Transcript, Part 3, p. 3, May 16, 1914. Obituary. Google News Eprint. Originally published without attribution. The Comprehensive Bibliography (p. 157) attributes it to Peirce's youngest brother Herbert; His Glassy Essence (p. 25) to both Herbert and their sister Helen. (Kenneth Laine Ketner was chief editor of the former and later authored the latter).
- Becker, George F. (1914 May 27), "Charles Santiago Sanders Peirce '59", Harvard Alumni Bulletin, v. XVI, n. 4, May 27, pp. 549–550. Google Books Eprint and search for the text.
- Russell, Francis C. (1914 July), "In Memoriam Charles S. Peirce" in The Monist v. 24, n. 3. July, 469–472. Google books and search for the text.
- Davis, Ellery W. (1914 October), "Charles Peirce at Johns Hopkins" in The Mid-West Quarterly v. 2, n. 1, pp. 48–56. University of Nebraska – Lincoln. U of N Digital Commons PDF Eprint. Google Books Eprint.
- Woodbridge, J. E. Frederick and Bush, Wendell T., eds. (1916 December 21), Peirce memorial issue, The Journal of Philosophy, Psychology, and Scientific Methods, v. XIII, n. 26. Google Books Eprint (has title page, but some other pages are botched. Links below are to another Google edition which lacks the title page).
  - Royce, Josiah, and Kernan, W. Fergus, "Charles Sanders Peirce", pp. 701–709. Google Books Eprint. Arisbe Eprint.
  - Dewey, John, "The Pragmatism of Peirce", pp. 709–715. Google Books Eprint. Reprinted or adapted in CLL.
  - Ladd-Franklin, Christine, "Charles Peirce at the Johns Hopkins", pp. 715–723. Google Books Eprint and search for the text.
  - Jastrow, Joseph, "Charles Peirce as a Teacher", pp. 723–726. Google Books Eprint and search for the text.
  - Cohen, Morris Raphael, "Charles S. Peirce and a Tentative Bibliography of His Published Writings", pp. 726–737. Essay plus bibliography. Google Books Eprint. Adapted in part as Introduction in CLL.
- Weiss, Paul (1934), "Peirce, Charles Sanders" in the Dictionary of American Biography, pp. 389–403. Internet Archive Eprint. Arisbe Eprint.
- Jastrow, Joseph (1934 November 16 Friday). "The Widow of Charles Peirce", Science, new series 80, pp. 440–441. Obituary of Juliette Peirce.

==== Later articles ====
- Answers.com, aggregator (accessed January 1, 2011), "Charles Sanders Peirce", reproduces six mostly brief "Charles Sanders Peirce" articles, from Britannica Concise Encyclopedia, Gale Encyclopedia of Biography, Oxford Dictionary of Philosophy, Columbia Encyclopedia, Oxford Companion to the Mind (credited to J. E. Tiles), and Wikipedia. Eprint.
- Atkin, Albert
  - (2006), "Charles Sanders Peirce (1839–1914)" in the Internet Encyclopedia of Philosophy. Eprint.
  - (2006), "C.S. Peirce's Architectonic Philosophy" in the Internet Encyclopedia of Philosophy. Eprint.
  - (2006), "C.S. Peirce's Pragmatism" in the Internet Encyclopedia of Philosophy. Eprint.
  - (2006), "Peirce's Theory of Signs" in the Stanford Encyclopedia of Philosophy. Eprint.
- Auspitz, Josiah Lee
  - (1983), "The Greatest Living American Philosopher", Commentary v. 76 n. 6, pp. 51–64. That is, Peirce's ideas live. Abstract.
  - (1994), "The Wasp Leaves the Bottle: Charles Sanders Peirce", The American Scholar, v. 63, n. 4, Autumn, 1994, pp. 602–618. Arisbe Eprint.
- Bloom, Pamela Taylor (2001), "Genius: Charles Sanders Peirce was a genius ahead of his time, a man who will continue to affect science into the 21st century", Vistas Magazine, v. 9, n. 1, winter. Texas Tech Eprint via Internet Archive. On Peirce, also on the Institute for Studies in Pragmaticism, Kenneth Layne Ketner, Charles Hardwick, and Gentry Harris.
- Burch, Robert (2001, 2006), "Charles Sanders Peirce", Stanford Encyclopedia of Philosophy, Jun 22, 2001, substantive revision Jul 26, 2006. Eprint.
- Didion, Keith (1998–2003), "Charles Peirce", The Philosophy Guide. Eprint.
- Halton, Eugene (1995?), "Charles Sanders Peirce 1839–1914: A Brief Outline of His Philosophy: with some relations to linguistics". Eprint (similar to a passage in Halton's 1995 critique of contemporary social theory Bereft of Reason). Most of it also appears, without credit, in the biography section of the Charles Sanders Peirce article at Philosophy Professor.
- Houser, Nathan
  - (1992), "Introduction", EP 1 (1867–1893). PEP Eprint. (General introduction for both volumes.)
  - (1998), "Introduction", EP 2 (1893–1913). PEP Eprint. (Introduction focusing on Peirce's last two decades).
- Kemerling, Garth (undated), "Charles Sanders Peirce (1839–1914)", Philosophy Pages Eprint.
- Kiryushchenko, Vitaly (2008), "In the Net of Abductions", PDF Eprint (University of Helsinki Commens papers), a 2008 translation of Chapter 9, which focuses on Peirce's second wife Juliette, in a Russian biography of Peirce Чарльз Сандерс Пирс, или Оса в бутылке: введение в интеллектуальную историю Америки (Charles Sanders Peirce, or the Wasp in the Bottle: An Introduction to the Intellectual History of America), Territorija buduschego Publishing House, Moscow, March 2009.
- National Oceanic and Atmospheric Administration (2006 last update), "Charles Sanders Peirce", NOAA History: Giants of Science. Eprint.
- Oakes, Edward T. (1993), "Discovering the American Aristotle", First Things: The Journal of Religion, Culture, and Public Life, December 1993. Eprint.
- O'Connor, J.J. and Robertson, E.F. (2005), "Charles Sanders Peirce" in the MacTutor History of Mathematics. Eprint.
- Peirce Edition Project editor(s)
  - (undated), "Chronology" (of Peirce's life), the Peirce Edition Project, PEP Eprint.
  - Houser, Nathan (undated), "Charles S. Peirce". Extract on Peirce' life from unpublished paper. PEP Eprint.
  - Fisch, Max H. (1981), "Introduction", W 1, 1857–1866. Eprint.
  - Fisch, Max H. (1984), "Introduction", W 2, 1867–1871. Eprint.
  - Fisch, Max H. (1986), "Introduction", W 3, 1872–1878. Eprint.
  - Houser, Nathan (1989), "Introduction", W 4, 1879–1884. Eprint.
  - Houser, Nathan (1993), "Introduction", W 5, 1884–1886. Eprint.
  - Houser, Nathan (2000), "Introduction", W 6, 1886–1890. Eprint.
  - Houser, Nathan (2009), "Introduction", W 8, 1890–1892. PDF Eprint.
- Ransdell, Joseph
  - (1986), "Charles Sanders Peirce (1839–1914)" (Entry on Peirce in the Encyclopedic Dictionary of Semiotics), edited by Thomas Sebeok (with Umberto Eco), Mouton de Gruyter, 1986, The Hague), pp. 673–695. Subsequently revised, Arisbe Eprint.
  - (c. 1998), "Who Is Charles Peirce?", Arisbe: the Peirce Gateway FAQ on Peirce. Arisbe Eprint.
- Searle, Leroy F. (1994), "Charles Sanders Peirce", The Johns Hopkins Guide to Literary Criticism and Theory. Internet Archive Eprint. U of Washington Eprint.
- Shin, Sun-Joo and Hammer, Eric (2011), "Peirce's Logic" in the Stanford Encyclopedia of Philosophy. Eprint
- Stanley, William A. (1978), Charles Peirce, scholar, cartographer, mathematician, and metrologist: An American philosopher, National Oceanic and Atmospheric Administration, NOAA Reprint, v. 8, no. 2, 4 pages. Reprinted 1986, U. S. Department of Commerce. NOAA Eprint.

==== Books ====
- Almeder, Robert F. (1980), The philosophy of Charles S. Peirce: A critical introduction, Rowman and Littlefield, 205 pages (ISBN 978-0847668540, ISBN 0-8476-6854-1).
- Anderson, Douglas (1995), Strands of System: The Philosophy of Charles Peirce, Purdue University Press, 218 pages, P.U.P. catalog page, hardcover (ISBN 978-1557530585, ISBN 1-55753-058-0), paperback (ISBN 978-1557530592, ISBN 1-55753-059-9).
- Brent, Joseph L. (1993, 1998), Charles Sanders Peirce: A Life, Indiana University Press, Bloomington, IN, first edition 1993, ISBN 978-0-253-31267-9, ISBN 0-253-31267-1. Revised and enlarged edition, 1998, 432 pages, I.U.P. catalog page, paperback (ISBN 978-0-253-21161-3, ISBN 0-253-21161-1), and 1998, NetLibrary (ISBN 9780585037462, ISBN 0-585-03746-9).
- Corrington, Robert S. (1993), An Introduction to C. S. Peirce : Philosopher, Semiotician, and Ecstatic Naturalist, Rowman and Littlefield Publishers, Lanham, MD, 240 pages, hardcover (ISBN 978-0847678136, ISBN 0-8476-7813-X), paper (ISBN 978-0847678143, ISBN 0-8476-7814-8).
- Deledalle, Gérard (following appear to be the same book with many ISBNs)
  - and Petrilli, S. (tra.) (1989), Charles S. Peirce, 1839–1914: An Intellectual Biography, John Benjamins Publishing Co., 117 pages, hardcover (ISBN 978-9027220677, ISBN 90-272-2067-0).
  - (1990), Charles S. Peirce: An Intellectual Biography, John Benjamins Publishing Co., 92 pages, hardcover (ISBN 978-1556190827, ISBN 1-55619-082-4).
- de Waal, Cornelis (2001), On Peirce, Wadsworth Publishing Group, 85 to 96 pages (descriptions vary), paperback (ISBN 0-534-58376-8, ISBN 0-534-58376-8), WPG/Cengage catalog page. Electronic editions available only to faculty and students. Systematic exposition of Peirce, organized along the lines of Peirce's own classification of the sciences.
- Feibleman, James Kern (1970), Introduction to the Philosophy of Charles Peirce, The MIT Press, 501 pages, hardcover (ISBN 978-0262060356, ISBN 0-262-06035-3), paperback (ISBN 978-0262560085, ISBN 0-262-56008-9).
- Hogan, Edward R. (2008 January), Of the Human Heart: A Biography of Benjamin Peirce, Lehigh University Press catalog page, Bethlehem, PA, paperback (ISBN 978-0934223935, ISBN 0-934223-93-9).
- Hookway, Christopher (1985), Peirce, Routledge and Kegan Paul, London, UK, 1985, 328 pages, hardcover (ISBN 978-0710097156, ISBN 0-7100-9715-8), paper (ISBN 978-0415087803, ISBN 0-415-08780-5).
- Knight, Thomas Stanley (1958? / 1965), Charles Peirce, Washington Square Press(and/or Twayne Publishers?), hardcover, 200 pages. (Online info seems a bit sketchy).
- Murphey, Murray G., (1961), The Development of Peirce's Philosophy, Harvard University Press, Cambridge, MA, 1961 and Oxford University Press, London, UK, 1961. Reprinted, Hackett Publishing Company, Indianapolis, IN, 1993, 448 pages, HPC catalog page, cloth (ISBN 978-0-87220-231-3, ISBN 0-87220-231-3), paper (ISBN 978-0-87220-183-5, ISBN 0-87220-183-X).
- Parker, Kelly, A. (1998), The Continuity of Peirce's Thought, Vanderbilt University Press, Nashville, TN, 288 pages, V.U.P. catalog page, cloth (ISBN 978-0-8265-1296-3, ISBN 0-8265-1296-8).
- Peirce, Charles S. and Ketner, Kenneth Laine (1998), His Glassy Essence: An Autobiography of Charles Sanders Peirce, Vanderbilt University Press, Nashville, TN, 416 pages, hardcover (ISBN 978-0826513137, ISBN 0-8265-1313-1). (Draws from Peirce's writings and uses fictional elements). Book's Internet homepage: http://www.wyttynys.net/
- Walther, Elizabeth (1989), C. S. Peirce : Leben und Werk, Agis-Verlag, Baden-Baden, Germany.

==== Arisbe, Peirce House ====
- Batcheler, Penelope Hartshorne (1983), Historic structure report: Architectural data section, Charles S. Peirce house, Delaware Water Gap National Recreation Area, Pennsylvania (NPS), Denver Service Center, Mid-Atlantic/North Atlantic Team, Branch of Cultural Resources, National Park Service, U. S. Dept. of the Interior, 189 pages.
- O'Malley, Megan (2000), "Philosopher Charles Peirce", Spanning the Gap (Newsletter of Delaware Water Gap National Recreation Area), v. 22, n. 3, fall. National Park Service PDF Eprint. Internet Archive HTML versions, some with sharper photo-images than the PDF has.
- Pike County Historical Society at the Columns (undated), "Charles Sanders Peirce". Eprint. The Society has a collection of Peirce-related biographical material, books, and correspondence. Milford (Pennsylvania) is in Pike County. Internet Archive earlier version.
- Ransdell, Joseph (1998), "Why is this Site called Arisbe?", Arisbe Eprint. Information on Peirce's home Arisbe.
- Solon, Thomas E. (1999), "A Pragmatic Rehabilitation – The Continuing Use of Arisbe, Home of C.S. Peirce", Cultural Resource Management v. 22, n. 5, National Park Service PDF Eprint.

=== Anthologies and journals' special issues ===
- Anderson, Douglas, ed., Hausman, Carl, ed., and Rosenthal, Sandra, ed. (1999), Classical American Philosophy: Its Contemporary Vitality, University of Illinois Press, Urbana, IL, 280 pages, hardcover (ISBN 978-0252024542, ISBN 0-252-02454-0), paperback (ISBN 978-0-252-06760-0) UIP catalog page.
- Bernstein, Richard J., ed. (1965), Perspectives on Peirce: Critical Essays on Charles Sanders Peirce, Yale University Press, 148 pages (ISBN 0300003080), reprinted, Greenwood Press, Westport, CT, 148 pages, hardcover (ISBN 978-0-313-22414-0, ISBN 0-313-22414-5). Amazon lists Peirce as author and Bernstein as editor, but it appears to be an anthology of essays about Peirce. Google Book Search mentions "Contributor Paul Weiss" for the Greenwood edition.
- van Brakel, Jaap and van Heerden, Michael (1998), C. S. Peirce Categories to Constantinople: Proceedings of the International Symposium on Peirce Leuven 1997, Leuven University Press, 154 pages, paperback (ISBN 978-9061869399, ISBN 90-6186-939-0), LUP catalog page.
- Brunning, Jacqueline, and Forster, Paul, eds. (1997), The Rule of Reason: The Philosophy of C. S. Peirce, University of Toronto Press, Toronto, ON, 316 pages, hardcover (ISBN 978-0802008299, ISBN 0-8020-0829-1), paperback (ISBN 978-0802078193, ISBN 0-8020-7819-2) UTP catalog page.
- Colapietro, Vincent, and M. Olshewsky, Thomas, eds., and Charles S. Peirce Sesquicentennial International Congress, ed. and corporate author (1996), Peirce's Doctrine of Signs: Theory, Applications, and Connections, Mouton de Gruyter, 463 pages, hardcover (ISBN 978-3110142525, ISBN 3-11-014252-X).
- Colapietro, Vincent M., ed. (1998), "C. S. Peirce", American Catholic Philosophical Quarterly, v. 72 n. 2 (Spring 1998): pp. 143–312. ACPQ page.
- Debrock, Guy
  - and Hulswit, Menno, eds. (1994), Living Doubt: Essays concerning the Epistemology of Charles Sanders Peirce (Synthese Library), Springer (July 31, 1994), 336 pages, hardcover (ISBN 978-0792328988, ISBN 0-7923-2898-1).
  - ed. (2003), Process Pragmatism: Essays on a Quiet Philosophical Revolution, Rodopi, Amsterdam and New York, 199 pages, paperback (ISBN 978-9042009851, ISBN 90-420-0985-3), Rodopi catalog page.
- Eco, Umberto and Sebeok, Thomas Albert, eds. (1984), The Sign of Three: Dupin, Holmes, Peirce, 236 pages, Indiana University Press, hardcover (ISBN 978-0253352354, ISBN 0-253-35235-5), 1st Midland Book Edition 1988 paperback (ISBN 978-0253204875, ISBN 0-253-20487-9) IUP catalog page. Ten essays on methods of abductive inference in Poe's Dupin, Doyle's Holmes, and Peirce.
- Fabbrichesi, Rossella and Marietti, Susanna, Eds. (2006), Semiotics and Philosophy in Charles Sanders Peirce, Cambridge Scholars Publishing, 241 pp., new edition, collects the papers presented to the International Conference Semiotics and Philosophy in C.S. Peirce (Milan, April 2005) with additional contributions, hardcover (CSP catalog page) (ISBN 9781904303749, ISBN 1-904303-74-9) and, in 2008, paperback (CSP catalog page) (ISBN 978-1847187888, ISBN 1-84718-788-9).
- Freeman, Eugene, ed. (1999), Relevance of Charles Peirce (Monist Library of Philosophy), Open Court, 412 pages, hardcover (ISBN 978-0914417002, ISBN 0-914417-00-2). Includes "Bibliography of Charles Peirce. 1976 through 1981", by Christian J. W. Kloesel.
- Hilpinen, Risto, ed. (1996), The Philosophy of C. S. Peirce, Synthese v. 106, n. 3, March 1996, pp. 299–455, Springer, print ISSN 0039-7857, online ISSN 1573-0964. Special Peirce issue.
- Institute for Studies in Pragmaticism, ed. (1979), Studies in Peirce's Semiotic: A Symposium, essays which Institute members presented at an annual meeting of the Semiotic Society of America in Denver in October 1977. Texas Tech University Institute for Studies in Pragmaticism, Lubbock, TX.
- ICCS 1997, Lukose, Dickson, ed., Delugach, Harry S., ed., Keeler, Mary, ed., Searle, Leroy, ed., and Sowa, John F., ed. (1997), Conceptual Structures: Fulfilling Peirce's Dream, Fifth International Conference on Conceptual Structures, ICCS'97, Seattle, Washington, US, August 3–8, 1997. Proceedings. Springer, 621 pages, Springer catalog page, paperback (ISBN 9783540633082, ISBN 3-540-63308-1).
- Houser, Nathan, Roberts, Don D., and Van Evra, James (eds., 1997), Studies in the Logic of Charles Sanders Peirce, Indiana University Press, Bloomington, IN, 1997, IUP catalog page, 653 pages, hardcover (ISBN 978-0-253-33020-8, ISBN 0-253-33020-3).
- Kauffman, Louis and Brier, Søren, eds. (2001), Peirce and Spencer-Brown: History and Synergies in Cybersemiotics, special double issue of Cybernetics and Human Knowing, v. 8, n. 1-2, 2001. 2007 edition, Imprint Academic, 225 pages (Amazon entry claims 159 pages), paperback (ISBN 978-1845401054, ISBN 1-84540-105-0), IA catalog page.
- Ketner, Kenneth Laine; Ransdell, Joseph; Eisele, Carolyn; Fisch, Max; and Hardwick, Charles: eds. (1982), Proceedings of C. S. Peirce Bicentennial International Congress (in Amsterdam), Texas Tech University Press, 399 pages, hardcover (ISBN 978-0896720756, ISBN 0-89672-075-6).
- Ketner, Kenneth Laine, ed. (1995), Peirce and Contemporary Thought: Philosophical Inquiries, Fordham University Press, New York, 444 pages, F.U.P. catalog page, hardcover (ISBN 9780823215539, ISBN 0-8232-1553-9).
- Kevelson, Roberta, ed. (1991), Peirce and Law: Issues in Pragmatism, Legal Realism, and Semiotics, Peter Lang Publishing Group, 225 pages, hardcover (ISBN 978-0-8204-1519-2), Peter Lang catalog page.
- Misak, Cheryl J. (ed., 2004), The Cambridge Companion to Peirce, Cambridge University Press, Cambridge, UK, C.U.P. catalog page, hardback (ISBN 9780521570060, ISBN 0-521-57006-9), paper (ISBN 9780521579100, ISBN 0-521-57910-4). Articles by Christopher Hookway, Peter Skagestad, Isaac Levi, C.J. Misak, Douglas Anderson, Sandra B. Rosenthal, Randall R. Dipert, Sami Pihlstrom, John Boler, T.L. Short.
- Monist editors
  - (1980), The Relevance of Charles Peirce, Part I, The Monist, v. 63 n. 3, July 1980, The Hegeler Institute, Monist catalog page.
  - (1982), The Relevance of Charles Peirce, Part II, The Monist, v. 65 n. 2, April 1982, The Hegeler Institute, Monist catalog page. Includes in pp. 246–276 a 648-item Peirce bibliography by Christian J. W. Kloesel for years 1976–1980.
- Moore, Edward C., and Robin, Richard S., eds.,
  - (1964), Studies in the Philosophy of C. S. Peirce, Second Series, University of Massachusetts Press, Amherst, MA, 1964. Contains a bibliography of secondary literature prior to 1964, pp. 486–514.
  - (1992), From Time & Chance to Consciousness: Studies in the Metaphysics of Charles Peirce, Berg Publishers, 256 pages, hardcover (ISBN 978-0854963799, ISBN 0-85496-379-0). Selected papers, devoted primarily to Peirce's metaphysics, from the Harvard Congress commemorating the 150th anniversary of the birth of Charles Peirce.
- Moore, Edward C., ed. (1993), Charles S. Peirce and the Philosophy of Science: Papers from the Harvard Sesquicentennial Congress, University of Alabama Press, Tuscaloosa, AL, 512 pages, hardcover (ISBN 978-0817306656, ISBN 0-8173-0665-X), paperback 2007 (ISBN 978-0817354169 ISBN 0-8173-5416-6), UAP catalog page.
- Moore, Matthew E. (2010 November 1?) New Essays on Peirce's Mathematical Philosophy, Open Court (catalog page), 384 pages, trade paper (ISBN 978-0-8126-9681-3, ISBN 0-8126-9681-6). Includes new essays by Christopher Hookway, Sun-Joo Shin, Ahti-Veikko Pietarinen, Daniel Campos, Susanna Marietti, Claudine Tiercelin, Elizabeth Cooke, Fernando Zalamea, Philip Ehrlich, Jérôme Havenel, and Matthew E. Moore.
- Muller, John P. and Brent, Joseph L., eds. (2000), Peirce, Semiotics, and Psychoanalysis, The Johns Hopkins University Press, 200 pages, hardcover (ISBN 978-0801862885, ISBN 0-8018-6288-4).
- Parret, Herman, ed. (1994), Peirce and Value Theory: On Peircean Ethics and Aesthetics, John Benjamins Publishing Co (June 1994), 381 pages, hardcover (ISBN 978-1556193408, ISBN 1-55619-340-8), JB catalog page. Most of the essays were presented at the Sesquicentennial Congress (Harvard University, September 1989.
- Peirce Studies editors (#8 in this series is Semiotic and Significs 2nd edition, and #2-5 & 7 in the series are single-author books; see under authors' names under "Other Works" below or use browser's "Find" feature to find instances of "Peirce Studies #" on this page. Full list Eprint (once there, scroll down), and #1-6 with fuller information Eprint (once there, scroll down).
  - (1979), Studies in Peirce's Semiotic: A Symposium by Members of the Institute for Studies in Pragmaticism (Peirce Studies #1) (1979), Texas Tech University, Institute for Studies in Pragmaticism, 100 pages, hardcover (ISBN 978-0936842011 ISBN 0-936842-01-6).
  - (1999), Charles Sanders Peirce Memorial Appreciation (Peirce Studies #6), presented at the memorial meeting of the Charles Sanders Peirce Sesquicentennial International Congress, Harvard University, 10 September 1989. Press of Arisbe Associates, Elsah, IL, 48 pages, hardcover (ISBN 978-0966769500 ISBN 0-9667695-0-3).
- Rosenbaum, Stuart E., ed. (2003), Pragmatism and Religion: Classical Sources and Original Essays, University of Illinois Press, 336 pages, UOI catalog page, hardcover (ISBN 978-0252028380, ISBN 0-252-02838-4), paperback (ISBN 978-0252071225, ISBN 0-252-07122-0).
- Shapiro, Michael, ed.
  - (1993), The Peirce Seminar Papers: An Annual of Semiotic Analysis: Volume One, 1993, Berghahn Books, 272 pages, (ISBN 978-1571810601, ISBN 1-57181-060-9).
  - and Haley, Michael, managing ed. (1994), The Peirce Seminar Papers: Annual of Semiotic Analysis: Volume II, 1994, Berghahn Books, 259 pages, hardcover (ISBN 978-0854963577, ISBN 0-85496-357-X), Berghahn catalog page gives "1995" as publication date.
  - (1998), The Peirce Seminar Papers: Essays in Semiotic Analysis, Peter Lang Publishing, 123 pages, hardcover (ISBN 978-0820431420, ISBN 0-8204-3142-7) Peter Lang catalog page.
  - (1999), The Peirce Seminar Papers: Essays in Semiotic Analysis: Volume IV: Proceedings of the International Colloquium on Language and Peircean Sign Theory, Duke University, June 19–21, 1997, Berghahn Books, 700 pages, bibliog., hardcover (ISBN 978-1-57181-732-7), Berghahn catalog page.
  - (2003), The Peirce Seminar Papers: Essays in Semiotic Analysis: Volume V: The State of the Art, Berghahn Books, 256 pages, bibliog., hardcover, (ISBN 1-57181-419-1, ISSN 1068-3771), Bergahn catalog page.
- Shook, John R., and Margolis, Joseph, eds. (2006), A Companion to Pragmatism, Blackwell (now Wiley), Malden, MA, 431 pages, hardcover (ISBN 978-1405116213, ISBN 1-4051-1621-8) Blackwell catalog page. (Incl. Peirce articles by Colapietro, Haack, and D. Anderson.)
- Tomaselli, Keyan, ed. (2008), Peirce Logic and Mining Safety (Arnold Shepperson memorial issue) Critical Arts: A Journal of South-North Cultural and Media Studies, v. 22, n. 2, November 2008, special issue, Routledge, University of South Africa Press, catalog page.
- Transactions of the Charles S. Peirce Society editors (1965–present), quarterly since spring 1965. Table of contents, all issues Eprint. Articles, essays, notes, and, since fall 1997, book reviews.
- Wiener, Philip P., and Young, Frederick (eds., 1952), Studies in the Philosophy of Charles Sanders Peirce, Harvard University Press, Cambridge, MA, 396 pages. Includes "Some Additions to Morris R. Cohen's Bibliography of Peirce's Published Writings", by Max H. Fisch and Daniel C. Haskell, pp. 375–381.

=== Other works ===
- Aliseda, Atocha (2006), Abductive Reasoning: Logical Investigations into Discovery and Explanation, Springer: catalog page, 225 pages, hardcover (ISBN 978-1402039065, ISBN 1-4020-3906-9).
- Anderson, D. R. (1987), Creativity and the Philosophy of C. S. Peirce, Springer: catalog page, 192 pages, hardcover (ISBN 978-9024735747, ISBN 90-247-3574-2).
- Anellis, Irving H.
  - (1993), "Review of A Peircean Reduction Thesis: The Foundations of Topological Logic by Robert Burch" in Modern Logic v. 3, n. 4, 401-406, Project Euclid Open Access PDF 697 KB. Criticism and some suggestions for improvements.
  - (1995), "Peirce Rustled, Russell Pierced: How Charles Peirce and Bertrand Russell Viewed Each Other's Work in Logic, and an Assessment of Russell's Accuracy and Role in the Historiography of Logic", Modern Logic, 5, 270–328. Arisbe Eprint
  - (1997), "Tarski's Development of Peirce's Logic of Relations" (Google Books Eprint), in Studies in the Logic of Charles Sanders Peirce, Indiana University Press: catalog page, Bloomington, IN, 653 pages, hardcover (ISBN 978-0-253-33020-8, ISBN 0-253-33020-3). Anellis gives an account of a Reduction Thesis proof discussed and presented by Peirce in his letter to William James of August 1905 (L224, 40-76, printed in NEM 3, 809-835).
- Apel, Karl-Otto (1981), Charles S. Peirce: From Pragmatism to Pragmaticism, 288 pages, University of Massachusetts Press, hardcover (October 1981) (ISBN 978-0870231773, ISBN 0-87023-177-4), reprinted, Humanities Press Intl (August 1995), paperback (ISBN 978-0391038950, ISBN 0-391-03895-8).
- Arens, Edmund and Smith, David, tra. (1994), The Logic of Pragmatic Thinking: From Peirce to Habermas , Prometheus Books, 192 pages, hardcover (ISBN 978-0391038059, ISBN 0-391-03805-2).
- Awbrey Jon, Awbrey Susan (1995). "Interpretation as Action: The Risk of Inquiry". Inquiry: Critical Thinking Across the Disciplines. 15: 40–52. doi:10.5840/inquiryctnews199515125.
- Ayer, A. J., (1968), The origins of pragmatism: Studies in the philosophy of Charles Sanders Peirce and William James, Freeman, Cooper, 336 pages, hardcover.
- Ayim, Maryann (1982), Peirce's view of the roles of reason and instinct in scientific inquiry, Meerut, India: Anu Prakashan, 155 pages.
- van Baest, Arian (1995), The semiotics of C. S. Peirce applied to music: A matter of belief, Tilburg University Press, 118 pages, paperback (ISBN 978-9036198653, ISBN 90-361-9865-8).
- Bakalis, Nikolaos (2011), Philosophical Historical Dimensions of Peirce's Self-Corrective Thesis, Suedwestdeutscher Verlag fuer Hochschulschriften, 280 pages (ISBN 978-3838124698, ISBN 3-8381-2469-3).
- Beatty, Richard (1969), "Peirce's Development of Quantifiers and of Predicate Logic", Notre Dame Journal of Formal Logic, Volume X, Number 1, January 1969, 13 pages, Project Euclid PDF Eprint 1,576 KB.
- Beil, Ralph G. (2004), "Peirce, Clifford, and Dirac", International Journal of Theoretical Physics v. 43, n. 5, 1301–1315.
- Beil, Ralph G. and Ketner, Kenneth
  - (2003), "Peirce, Clifford, and Quantum Theory", International Journal of Theoretical Physics v. 42, n. 9, 1957–1972.
  - (2006), A Triadic Theory of Elementary Particle Interactions and Quantum Computation, Lubbock: Institute for Studies in Pragmaticism: catalog page, viii + 49 pages, 8.5×11 hardcover with alk. paper (ISBN 0-9667695-9-7).
- Bergman, Mats
  - (1999), "Reflections on the Role of the Communicative Sign in Semiotic", winner of 1999 Peirce Essay Contest, published in Transactions of the Charles S. Peirce Society (TCSPS), v. 36, n. 2, spring 2000, pp. 225–254. Commens Eprint.
  - (2002), "C. S. Peirce on Interpretation and Collateral Experience", presented in July 2002 at research seminar of the philosophy department of Åbo Akademi. Draft version Commens "Eprint" (PDF). (117 KiB).
  - (2009 June), Peirce's Philosophy of Communication: The Rhetorical Underpinnings of the Theory of Signs (Continuum Studies In American Philosophy), Continuum, 208 pages, hardcover (ISBN 978-1847064660, ISBN 1-84706-466-3).
- Boler, John F. (1963), Charles Peirce and scholastic realism: A study of Peirce's relation to John Duns Scotus, University of Washington Press, 177 pages.
- Brady, Geraldine (2000), From Peirce to Skolem: A Neglected Chapter in the History of Logic, North-Holland/Elsevier Science BV: catalog page, Amsterdam, Netherlands, 625 pages, hardbound (ISBN 978-0-444-50334-3, ISBN 0-444-50334-X).
- Braude, Stephen E. (1998), "Peirce and the Paranormal" in TCSPS, v. 34, n. 1, winter. Eprint.
- Buchler, Justus (1939), Charles Peirce's Empiricism, Harcourt, Brace, and Co., New York, NY, and Kegan Paul, Trench, Trubner & Co. Ltd., London, 275 pages + publisher's catalog. Reprinted, 1966, Octagon Books, New York, and 2000, Routledge, 296 pages, hardcover (ISBN 978-0415225366, ISBN 0-415-22536-1). Routledge catalog page.
- Burch, Robert (1991), A Peircean Reduction Thesis: The Foundations of Topological Logic, Texas Tech University Press, Lubbock, TX, 152 pages, hardcover (ISBN 978-0896722477, ISBN 0-89672-247-3). Offers a proof.
- Burgess, Paul (c. 1988), "Why Triadic?: Challenges to the Structure of Peirce's Semiotic", research paper for an independent study in the philosophy department by graduate student at Duke University, reviews the various proposals by Donald Mertz, Herbert Schneider, Carl Hausman, and Carl Vaught to augment Peirce's triads to tetrads, and Douglas Greenlee's proposal to reduce Peirce's triads to dyads. Not formally published, but clear value as a review of a distinct issue. Eprint.
- Burks, Arthur W.
  - (1943), "Peirce's Conception of Logic as a Normative Science" in The Philosophical Review, v. 52, n. 2, 187–193, March. JSTOR.
  - (1946), "Peirce's Theory of Abduction" in Philosophy of Science, v. 13, n. 4, 301–306, October. JSTOR.
  - (1978), Review of The New Elements of Mathematics by Charles S. Peirce" in Bulletin of the American Mathematical Society, v. 84, n. 5, September. Project Euclid eprint.
  - (1980), "Man: Sign or Algorithm? A Rhetorical Analysis of Peirce's Semiotics" in TCSPS, v. 16, n. 4, fall, 279–292.
  - (1996), "Peirce's evolutionary pragmatic idealism" in Synthese, v. 106, n. 3, March, Springer Netherlands. Deep Blue Eprint.
  - (1997), "Learning, Logic, and Creativity in Evolution" in Studies in the Logic of Charles Sanders Peirce, pp. 497–534, Indiana University Press: catalog page, Bloomington, IN, 653 pages, hardcover (ISBN 978-0-253-33020-8, ISBN 0-253-33020-3).
- Carus, Paul
  - (1892), "Mr. Charles S. Peirce's Onslaught on the Doctrine of Necessity" in The Monist, v. 2, n. 4, July, Paul Carus, ed., 560–582, The Open Court Publishing Co., Chicago, IL, for the Hegeler Institute. Google Books Eprint. Internet Archive Eprint.
  - (1893), "The Founder of Tychism, His Methods, Philosophy, and Criticisms: In Reply to Mr. Charles S. Peirce" in The Monist, v. 3, n. 4, July, Paul Carus, ed., 571–622, The Open Court Publishing Co., Chicago, IL, for the Hegeler Institute. Google Books Eprint. Internet Archive Eprint. A reply to Peirce's "Reply to the Necessitarians" in the same issue.
- Cheng, Chung-ying (1969), Peirce's and Lewis's theories of induction, Martinus Nijhoff (an imprint of Brill), 206 pages.
- Chiasson, Phyllis (2001), Peirce's Pragmatism, The Design for Thinking, John R. Shook (ed.), foreword by Shook, Rodopi Bv Editions: catalog page, Amsterdam, 2001, 259 (xiv + 243) pages, soft cover (ISBN 978-9042012752, ISBN 90-420-1275-7).
- Colapietro, Vincent Michael (1988), Peirce's Approach to the Self: A Semiotic Perspective on Human Subjectivity, State University of New York Press: catalog page, 141 pages, hardcover (ISBN 978-0-88706-882-9, ISBN 0-88706-882-0), paperback (ISBN 978-0-88706-883-6, ISBN 0-88706-883-9).
- Collier, John (1999), "The Dynamical Basis of Information and the Origins of Semiosis" in Semiosis • Evolution • Energy: Towards a Reconceptualization of the Sign, based on the 1997 conference, Aachen: Shaker Verlag, Germany, 1999, Bochum Publications in Semiotics New Series. v. 3: 111-136. Eprint PDF.
- Cooke, Elizabeth F. (2007), Peirce's Pragmatic Theory of Inquiry: Fallibilism And Indeterminacy, Continuum International Publishing Group: catalog page, 174 pages, hardcover (ISBN 978-0826488992, ISBN 0-8264-8899-4).
- Correia, Joachim Hereth and Pöschel, Reinhard (2006), "The Teridentity and Peircean Algebraic Logic", Conceptual Structures: Inspiration and Application (ICCS 2006), pp. 229–246, Springer: catalog page, ISBN 3-540-35893-5. Frithjof Dau calls it "the strong version" of proof of Peirce's Reduction Thesis (that triadic relations are necessary and sufficient for a full account of relations).
- Crease, Robert P. (2009), "Charles Sanders Peirce and the first absolute measurement standard: In his brilliant but troubled life, Peirce was a pioneer in both metrology and philosophy", Physics Today v. 62, issue 12, December, pp. 39–44. Eprint.
- Dahlberg, Edward (1964), "Cutpurse Philosopher", a page-and-some-fraction essay in his collection Alms for Oblivion, University of Minnesota Press, Minneapolis, Minnesota. The essay's title alludes to Peirce as victim and accuses an associate of his. Dahlberg is known for his style, not for his scholarship; some scholars, not all, agree with him about the intellectual theft issue. Anyway, the deep stylist, favorably contrasting Peirce with other pragmatists, said that Peirce's words "are isolated and austere, and have a dry Nantucket vision about them."
- Dauben, Joseph W. (1982), "Peirce's Place in Mathematics", Historia Mathematica v. 9, 311–325.
- Davis, William Hatcher (1972), Peirce's Epistemology, Martinus Nijhoff, The Hague, Netherlands / Kluwer Academic Publishers (?) / Springer (?), paperback (ISBN 978-9024712960, ISBN 90-247-1296-3).
- Debrock, Guy (1992), "Peirce, a Philosopher for the 21st Century. Introduction", TCSPS 28, 1–18.
- Deely, John
  - (2000), The Red Book: The Beginning of Postmodern Times or: Charles Sanders Peirce and the Recovery of Signum, 79 pages, text prepared for the Metaphysical Club of the University of Helsinki. U Helsinki Commens "Eprint" (PDF). (578 KiB).
  - (2000), The Green Book: The Impact of Semiotics on Philosophy, 65 pages, prepared for the First Annual Hommage à Oscar Parland at the University of Helsinki, U Helsinki Commens "Eprint" (PDF). (571 KiB).
  - (2003), "On the Word Semiotics, Formation and Origins", Semiotica 146.1/4, 1–50.
  - (2004a), Why Semiotics?, Legas: catalog page, Ottawa, Canada.
  - (2004b), "'Σημειον' to 'Sign' by Way of 'Signum': On the Interplay of Translation and Interpretation in the Establishment of Semiotics", Semiotica 148–1/4, 187–227.
  - (2006), "On 'Semiotics' as Naming the Doctrine of Signs", Semiotica 158.1/4 (2006), 1–33.
  - (2008 draft), "Clearing the Mists of a Terminological Mythology concerning Peirce", Arisbe PDF Eprint.
- Delaney, Cornelius F. (1993), Science, Knowledge, and Mind: A Study in the Philosophy of C. S. Peirce, University of Notre Dame Press, Notre Dame, IN, 183 pages, hardcover (ISBN 978-0268017484, ISBN 0-268-01748-4).
- Deledalle, Gérard (2000), C. S. Peirce's Philosophy of Signs, Indiana University Press: catalog page, Bloomington, IN, 2000, 199 pages, cloth (ISBN 978-0-253-33736-8, ISBN 0-253-33736-4).
- Dewey, John
  - (1910), How We Think, D. C. Heath, Lexington, MA, 1910. Reprinted, Prometheus Books, Buffalo, NY, 1991.
  - (1938), Logic: The Theory of Inquiry, Henry Holt and Company, New York, NY, 1938. Reprinted, pp. 1–527 in John Dewey, The Later Works, 1925–1953, Volume 12: 1938, Jo Ann Boydston (ed.), Kathleen Poulos (text. ed.), Ernest Nagel (intro.), Southern Illinois University Press, Carbondale and Edwardsville, IL, 1986.
- Dipert, Randall (1999), "Two Unjustly Neglected Aspects of C. S. Peirce's Philosophy of Mind", Eprint, also titled "Peirce's Two Contributions to the Philosophy of Mind." (Contribution to a conference in November 1999, "The Metaphysics of Consciousness").
- Ehrat, Johannes (2005), Cinema and Semiotic: Peirce and Film Aesthetics, Narration, and Representation, University of Toronto Press: catalog page, 670 pages, hardcover (ISBN 978-0802039125, ISBN 0-8020-3912-X).
- Eisele, Carolyn (1979), Studies in the Scientific and Mathematical Philosophy of C. S. Peirce, Richard Milton Martin (ed.), Mouton, The Hague, (Walter De Gruyter Inc.), 386 pages, hardcover (ISBN 978-9027978080, ISBN 90-279-7808-5).
- Ejsing, Anette (2007), Theology of Anticipation: A Constructive Study of C. S. Peirce, Pickwick Publications (Wipf and Stock Publishers): W&S catalog page, 178 pages, paperback (ISBN 978-1-59752-518-3, ISBN 1-59752-518-9).
- Esposito, Joseph L.
  - (1980), Evolutionary Metaphysics, The Development of Peirce's Theory of Categories, Ohio University Press, 1980, 252 pages, hardcover (ISBN 978-0821405512, ISBN 0-8214-0551-9).
  - (1999 or ongoing?), "Peirce's Theory of Semiosis: Toward a Logic of Mutual Affection", course outline and eight lectures linked at page's bottom, Cyber Semiotic Institute Eprint.
- Fann, K. T. (1970), Peirce's Theory of Abduction, Springer: catalog page, 62 pages, paperback (ISBN 978-9024700431, ISBN 90-247-0043-4).
- Finlay, Marike (1990), The Potential of Modern Discourse: Musil, Peirce, and Perturbation, Indiana University Press, 202 pages, hardcover (ISBN 978-0253322791, ISBN 0-253-32279-0), there seems also to be a paperback.
- Fisch, Max, (1986), Peirce, Semeiotic, and Pragmatism, Ketner, Kenneth Laine, and Kloesel, Christian J. W., eds., Indiana University Press: catalog page, Bloomington, IN, 1986, 480 pages, cloth (ISBN 978-0-253-34317-8, ISBN 0-253-34317-8).
- Fitzgerald, John Joseph (1966), Peirce's theory of signs as foundation for pragmatism, Mouton, The Hague, 182 pages.
- Fontrodona, Juan (2002), Pragmatism and Management Inquiry: Insights from the Thought of Charles S. Peirce, Quorum Books (Greenwood Publishing Group), now ABC-CLIO: catalog page, 232 pages, hardcover (ISBN 978-1567205152, ISBN 1-56720-515-1).
- Forster, Paul (2011), Peirce and the Threat of Nominalism, Cambridge U. Pr. (catalog page), 272 pages, hardcover (ISBN 978-0521118996, ISBN 0-521-11899-9), paperback, ebook.
- Freadman, Ann (2004), The Machinery of Talk: Charles Peirce and the Sign Hypothesis, Stanford University Press: catalog page, Palo Alto, CA, 352 pages, hardcover (ISBN 978-0804747394, ISBN 0-8047-4739-3), paperback (ISBN 978-0804747400, ISBN 0-8047-4740-7).
- Freeman, Eugene (1934), The categories of Charles Peirce, The Open Court Pub., Co., 62 pages. Issued also as thesis (Ph. D.), University of Chicago. Foreword by Charles Hartshorne.
- Gallie, W. B. (1952), Peirce and Pragmatism, Penguin Books, Harmondsworth, 1952, 247 pages, reprinted, Greenwood Press, Westport, CT (1966? – anyway October 23, 1975), 247 pages hardcover (ISBN 978-0837183428, ISBN 0-8371-8342-1).
- Gelpi, Donald L.
  - (2001 March), Gracing of Human Experience: Rethinking the Relationship Between Nature and Grace, Michael Glazier Books, Liturgical Press, 366 pages, paperback (ISBN 978-0814655948, ISBN 0-8146-5594-7). Peirce-related.
  - (2001 December), Peirce and Theology: Essays in the Authentication of Doctrine, University Press of America (Rowman & Littlefield): catalog page, 104 pages, hardcover (ISBN 978-0761819776, ISBN 0-7618-1977-0).
- Geyer, Denton Loring (1914), The Pragmatic Theory of Truth as Developed by Peirce, James, and Dewey, University of Illinois, 57 pages, Internet Archive Eprint.
- Gorlée, Dinda L. (1994), Semiotics and the Problem of Translation: With Special Reference to the Semiotics of Charles S. Peirce, Rodopi: catalog page, 255 pages, paperback (ISBN 978-9051836424, ISBN 90-5183-642-2).
- Goudge, Thomas A. (1970), Thought of C. S. Peirce, Dover Publications Inc., 360 pages, paperback (ISBN 978-0486222165, ISBN 0-486-22216-0).
- Greenlee, Douglas (1973), Peirce's concept of sign, Mouton, 148 pages, paperback (ISBN 9789027924940, ISBN 90-279-2494-5). (A revision of the author's thesis, Columbia University).
- Haack, Susan (1997), "Vulgar Rortyism", The New Criterion, v. 16, n. 3, Nov. 1997. Eprint. Review of Menand's anthology Pragmatism: A Reader.
- Haas, William Paul (1964), The conception of law and the unity of Peirce's philosophy, University of Notre Dame Press, 141 pages.
- Haley, Michael Cabot (1988), The Semeiosis of Poetic Metaphor (Peirce Studies #4), Indiana University Press, Institute for Studies in Pragmaticism, 1988, 178pp, incl. bibliography and references, hardcover (ISBN 978-0253351791, ISBN 0-253-35179-0).
- Hartshorne, Charles
  - (1928), "Continuity, the Form of Forms, in Charles Peirce", The Monist v. 39, pp. 521–534.
  - (1941), "Charles Sanders Peirce's Metaphysics of Evolution", New England Quarterly 14, pp. 49–63.
  - (1941), "A critique of Peirce's Idea of God", Philosophical Review v. 50, pp. 516–523.
  - (1949), "Chance, Love and Incompatibility", Philosophical Review v. 58, pp. 429–450.
  - (1952), "The Relativity of Non-relativity: Some Reflections on Firstness", Studies in the Philosophy of Charles Sanders Peirce, pp. 215–224, Wiener and Young, eds., Harvard University Press.
  - (1958), "Charles Peirce, Philosopher-Scientist", Journal of Public Law 7, pp. 2–12.
  - (1964), "Charles Peirce's 'One Contribution to Philosophy' and His Most Serious Mistake", Studies in the Philosophy of Charles Sanders Peirce, Second Series, Moore and Robin, eds. University of Massachusetts Press.
  - (1973), "Charles Peirce and Quantum Mechanics", TCSPS 9, pp. 191–201.
  - (1976), "Synthesis as Polyadic Inclusion: A Reply to Sessions." Southern Journal of Philosophy 14, pp. 245–255.
  - (1980), "A Revision of Peirce's Categories." The Monist v. 63, n. 3, pp. 277–89. Reprinted 1983 in The Relevance of Charles Peirce, pp. 80–92, Freeman, ed., La Salle, Illinois: Monist Library of Philosophy. Chapter 7 of Creativity in American Philosophy.
  - (1983), "Peirce's Fresh Look at Philosophical Problems", Krisis 1, 1, pp. 1–5.
  - (1988), "Can Peirce's Categories Be Retained?", Philosophie et Culture, Actes du XVIIe Congrès Mondial de Philosophie, pp. 140–142, Montréal: Éditions Montmorency.
- Hausman, Carl (1993), Charles S. Peirce's Evolutionary Philosophy, Cambridge University Press, 250 pages, hardcover (ISBN 978-0521415590, ISBN 0-521-41559-4), paperback 1997 C.U.P. catalog page (ISBN 978-0521597364, ISBN 0-521-59736-6).
- Havenel, Jérôme (2008), "Peirce's Clarifications on Continuity", TCSPS, v. 44, n. 1, winter, 68-133.
- van Heijenoort Jean (1967). "Logic as Language and Logic as Calculus". Synthese. 17: 324–30. doi:10.1007/bf00485036. S2CID 46978612.
- Hintikka, Jaakko (1980), "C. S. Peirce's 'First Real Discovery' and Its Contemporary Relevance", pages 304–315 in The Monist, v. 63, n. 3 (July, 1980), The Relevance of Charles Peirce, paperback, Hegeler Institute, La Salle, IN.
- Hookway, Christopher (2000, 2003), Truth, Rationality, and Pragmatism: Themes from Peirce, Oxford University Press, US, 328 pages, hardcover (ISBN 978-0198238362, ISBN 0-19-823836-3), new edition 2003: O.U.P. catalog page, 328 pages, paperback (ISBN 978-0199256587, ISBN 0-19-925658-6).
- Hoopes, James (1988), Community Denied: The Wrong Turn of Pragmatic Liberalism, Cornell University Press, 192 pages, hardcover (ISBN 978-0801435003 ISBN 0-8014-3500-5).
- Houser, Nathan (1989), "The Fortunes and Misfortunes of the Peirce Papers", Fourth Congress of the International Association for Semiotic Studies, Perpignan, France, 1989. Published, pp. 1259–1268 in Signs of Humanity, v. 3, Michel Balat and Janice Deledalle-Rhodes (eds.), Gérard Deledalle (gen. ed.), Mouton de Gruyter, Berlin, Germany, 1992. Eprint.
- Howe, Susan (1999), Pierce-Arrow, New Directions: catalog page, 144 pages, paperback (ISBN 978-0811214100, ISBN 0-8112-1410-9). Essays and poems focusing on Peirce and his wife Juliette.
- Hulswit, Menno
  - (1998) A semeiotic account of causation. The "cement of the universe" from a Peircean perspective, xiv, 258 pages, Thesis, Katholieke Universiteit Nijmegen, Netherlands, 1997. Text in English with 7-page summary in Dutch, paperback (ISBN 9090121161).
  - (2002), From Cause to Causation: A Peircean Perspective, Springer, 276 pages, hardcover Springer page (ISBN 978-1402009761, ISBN 1-4020-0976-3), softcover Springer page (ISBN 978-1-4020-0977-8).
- Ilarregui, Begoña and Nubiola, Jaime (1994), "The Continuity of Continuity: A Theme in Leibniz, Peirce, and Quine" in Leibniz und Europa, VI. Internationaler Leibniz-Kongress, Gottfried-Wilhelm-Leibniz-Gesellschaft e. V. Hannover, 1994, 361-371. Eprint.
- Johansen, Jorgen Dines (1992), Dialogic Semiosis: An Essay on Signs and Meaning, Indiana University Press: catalog page, 352 pages, hardcover (ISBN 978-0253330994, ISBN 0-253-33099-8).
- Kasser, Jeff (1998), "Peirce's Supposed Psychologism" in TCSPS, v. 35, n. 3, summer 1999, pp. 501–527, winner of the Society's 1998 essay prize. Arisbe Eprint.
- Kauffman, Louis H. (2001), "The Mathematics of Charles Sanders Peirce", Cybernetics and Human Knowing 8, 79–110. PDF file.
- Kent, Beverly E. (1987), Charles S. Peirce: Logic and the Classification of the Sciences, McGill-Queen's University Press, 258 pages, hardcover (ISBN 978-0773505629, ISBN 0-7735-0562-8).
- Ketner, Kenneth Laine
  - (1984), "The early history of computer design: Charles Sanders Peirce and Marquand's logical machines", with the assistance of Arthur Franklin Stewart, Princeton University Library Chronicle, v. 45, n. 3, pp. 186–211. PULC "Eprint" (PDF). Archived from the original (PDF) on 2011-07-16. (15.3 MiB).
  - (1990), Elements of Logic: An Introduction to Peirce's Existential Graphs (Spiral-bound), Texas Tech University Press, Lubbock, TX, 99 pages, spiral-bound (ISBN 978-0896722026, ISBN 0-89672-202-3).
  - and Percy, Walker, and Samway, Patrick H., ed. (1995), A Thief of Peirce: The Letters of Kenneth Laine Ketner and Walker Percy, University Press of Mississippi: catalog page, Jackson, MS, 328 pages, hardcover (ISBN 978-0878058105, ISBN 0-87805-810-9).
- Kevelson, Roberta
  - (1986), Charles S. Peirce's Method of Methods, John Benjamins Publishing Co.: catalog page, 180 pages, hardcover (ISBN 978-9027232892, ISBN 90-272-3289-X).
  - (1991), Peirce, Paradox, Praxis: The Image, the Conflict, and the Law, Mouton De Gruyter, 413 pages, hardcover (ISBN 978-3110123135, ISBN 3-11-012313-4).
  - (1993), Peirce's Esthetics of Freedom, Peter Lang Publishing Group: catalog page, 360 pages, hardcover (ISBN 978-0-8204-1898-8).
  - (1996), Peirce, Science, Signs, Peter Lang Publishing Group: catalog page, 206 pages, hardcover (ISBN 978-0-8204-3016-4).
  - (1998), Peirce's Pragmatism: The Medium as Method, Peter Lang Publishing Group: catalog page, 204 pages, hardcover (ISBN 978-0-8204-3982-2).
  - (1999), Peirce and the Mark of the Gryphon, Palgrave, 239 pages, hardcover (ISBN 978-0312176945, ISBN 0-312-17694-5). Draws from unpublished Peirce manuscripts. On the Internet, the publisher is variously given as St. Martin's Press, Macmillan, and Palgrave.
- Keyser, Cassius Jackson
  - (1935), "A glance at some of the ideas of Charles Sanders Peirce", Scripta Mathematica v. 3, pp. 11–37.
  - (1941), Charles Sanders Peirce as a pioneer (Scripta Mathematica pamphlets), published 1941 by Yeshiva college. Lecture by C. J. Keyser at The Galois Institute of Mathematics, May 18, 1935. Internet Archive Eprint.
- Kirkham, Richard (1995), Theories of Truth, MIT Press, Cambridge, MA.
- Lalor, Brendan (1997), "The Classification of Peirce's Interpretants", Semiotica 114-1/2, 31-40. Eprint.
- Lane, Robert
  - (2004), "On Peirce's Early Realism", TCSPS, 40, 575–605.
  - (2007), "Peirce's Modal Shift: From Set Theory to Pragmaticism", Journal of the History of Philosophy, v. 45, n. 4, Oct. 2007.
- Leja, Michael (2000), "Peirce, Visuality, and Art" in Representations v. 72 fall, U of C Press, pp. 97–122. First page.
- Lewis, Clarence Irving (1918), "Peirce", ch. 1, § 7, on pp. 79–106 (Internet Archive Eprint), in A Survey of Symbolic Logic, University of California Press, Berkeley, CA, vi + 409 pages.
- Liszka, James Jakób (1996), A General Introduction to the Semeiotic of C. S. Peirce, Indiana University Press: catalog page, Bloomington, IN, 151 pages, cloth (ISBN 978-0-253-33047-5, ISBN 0-253-33047-5). Liszka's synopsis.
- Martin, Richard Milton (1980), Peirce's Logic of Relations and Other Studies, 156 pages, Foris Publications (now Mouton de Gruyter), Dordrecht, Netherlands (ISBN 978-9070176174, ISBN 90-70176-17-3) and Prometheus Books, textbook binding (ISBN 978-9031601332, ISBN 90-316-0133-0).
- Marty, Robert (1997), "76 Definitions of The Sign by C. S. Peirce" collected and analyzed by Robert Marty, Department of Mathematics, University of Perpignan, Perpignan, France, and "12 Further Definitions or Equivalent proposed by Alfred Lang", Dept of Psychology, University of Bern, Bern, Switzerland, Eprint.
- Mayorga, Rosa (2007), From Realism to 'Realicism': The Metaphysics of Charles Sanders Peirce, Lexington Books: catalog page, 210 pages, hardcover (ISBN 978-0739115572, ISBN 0-7391-1557-X).
- Menand, Louis (2001), The Metaphysical Club: A Story of Ideas in America, Farrar, Straus, and Giroux, 384 pages, hardcover (ISBN 978-0374199630, ISBN 0-374-19963-9). Reprinted, 2002, Flamingo, paperback, 560 pages, ISBN 978-0-00-712690-3, ISBN 0-00-712690-5).
- Merrell, Floyd
  - (1995), Peirce's Semiotics Now: A Primer, illustrated, Canadian Scholars Press Inc., 254 pages, paperback (ISBN 978-1551300825, ISBN 1-55130-082-6).
  - (1997), Peirce, Signs, and Meaning, University of Toronto Press, hardcover 384 pages (ISBN 978-0802041357, ISBN 0-8020-4135-3 ), paperback 408 pages U.T.P. catalog page (ISBN 978-0802079824, ISBN 0-8020-7982-2).
- Misak, Cheryl J. (1991), Truth and the End of Inquiry : A Peircean Account of Truth, Oxford University Press (catalog page), Oxford, UK; 2004 paperback 232 pages (ISBN 978-0-19-927059-0).
- Mladenov, Ivan (2005), Conceptualizing Metaphors: On Charles Peirce's Marginalia, Routledge, 189 pages, hardcover (ISBN 978-0415360470, ISBN 0-415-36047-1).
- Moore, Edward C.
  - (1966), American pragmatism: Peirce, James and Dewey, 285 pages, Columbia University Press, NY. Reprinted, Greenwood Publishing Group, 1985, hardcover (ISBN 9780313247408).
  - and Burks, Arthur W. (1992), "Three Notes on the Editing of the Works of Charles S. Peirce" in TCSPS, v. 28, n. 1, winter, 83-106.
- Morris, Charles W. (1938), Foundations of the Theory of Signs, International Encyclopedia of Unified Science, v. I, n. 2, University of Chicago Press, Chicago, IL. 1953 paperback reprint.
- Moore, Matthew E. (2007), "The Genesis of the Peircean Continuum", TCSPS v. 43, n. 3, 425–469.
- Mounce, Howard O. (1997), The Two Pragmatisms: From Peirce to Rorty, Routledge, 245 pages, hardcover (ISBN 978-0415152822, ISBN 0-415-15282-8), paperback (ISBN 978-0415152839, ISBN 0-415-15283-6).
- Muller, John P. (1995), Beyond the Psychoanalytic Dyad: Developmental Semiotics in Freud, Peirce and Lacan, Routledge: catalog page, hardcover 256 pages (ISBN 978-0415910682, ISBN 0-415-91068-4), paperback 240 pages (ISBN 978-0415910699, ISBN 0-415-91069-2).
- Mullin, A. A. (1961), Philosophical comments on the philosophies of Charles Sanders Peirce and Ludwig Wittgenstein, Electrical Engineering Research Laboratory, Engineering Experiment Station, University of Illinois, Urbana, IL, Sponsored by the National Science Foundation.
- Nöth, Winfried (1990), Handbook of Semiotics, Indiana University Press, 576 pages, hardcover (ISBN 978-0253341204, ISBN 0-253-34120-5), 1995 paperback I.U.P. catalog page (ISBN 978-0253209597, ISBN 0-253-20959-5).
- Nubiola, Jaime
  - (1995), "The Branching of Science According to C. S. Peirce", Volume of Abstracts, 10th International Congress of Logic, Methodology and Philosophy of Science, Florencia (1995), 355. Complete version.
  - (1996), "C. S. Peirce: Pragmatism and Logicism", Philosophia Scientiae I/2, 121-130. Eprint.
  - (1996), "Scholarship on the Relations between Ludwig Wittgenstein and Charles S. Peirce" in Studies on the History of Logic. Proceedings of the III Symposium on the History of Logic, I. Angelelli and M. Cerezo, eds., Walter de Gruyter, Berlín, 1996, 281-294. Eprint.
  - (1998), "C. S. Peirce and the Hispanic Philosophy of the Twentieth Century", TCSPS, v. 34, n. 1, 31-49. Eprint.
  - (1998), "A Plea for a Peircean Turn in Analytic Philosophy", Paideia. XX World Congress of Philosophy. Abstracts, Boston, 10–16 August 1998, 148-149; complete in The Paideia Project: Proceedings of the Twentieth World Congress of Philosophy, Boston, MA. Eprint.
  - with Cobo, J. (2000), "The Spanish Mathematician Ventura Reyes Prósper and His Connections with Charles S. Peirce and Christine Ladd-Franklin", Arisbe, Lubbock, TX. Eprint.
  - (2001), "Peirce on Complexity" in Proceedings of the 7th International Congress of the IASS-AIS, W. Schmitz, ed., Thelem, Dresden, 2001, 11-23. Eprint.
  - (2003), "The Law of Reason and the Law of Love" in Process Pragmatism: Essays on a Quiet Philosophical Revolution, Debrock, ed., Rodopi, Amsterdam, 39-49. Eprint.
  - (2003), "The Abduction of God", C. Pearson (ed.), Progress in Peirce Studies, 2003: Religious Writings. Eprint.
  - (2005), "Abduction or the Logic of Surprise", Abduction; Between Subjectivity and Objectivity, Semiotica 153, 1/4, 117-13. PDF Eprint.
  - (2005), "The Classification of the Sciences and Cross-disciplinarity", TCSPS, v. 51, n. 2, 271-282. PDF Eprint.
  - (2008), "C. S. Peirce and G. M. Searle: The Hoax of Infallibilism", Cognitio 9/1, 73-84. Eprint.
- Ochs, Peter (1998), Peirce, Pragmatism, and the Logic of Scripture, Cambridge University Press: catalog page, 371 pages, hardcover (ISBN 978-0521570411, ISBN 0-521-57041-7), paperback 2005 (ISBN 978-0521604499, ISBN 0-521-60449-4).
- O'Hara, David Lloyd (2004), "Peirce, Plato and Miracles: On the Mature Peirce's Re-discovery of Plato and the Overcoming of Nominalistic Prejudice in History", for the 31st annual conference of the Society for the Advancement of American Philosophy, Eprint. Arisbe Eprint.
- Olsen, Len (2000), "On Peirce's Systematic Division of Signs", in TCSPS, v. 36, n. 4, fall 2000, pp. 563–578.
- Oppenheim, Frank M. (2005), Reverence For The Relations Of Life: Re-imagining Pragmatism Via Josiah Royce's Interactions With Peirce, James, And Dewey, University of Notre Dame Press: catalog page, 498 pages, hardcover (ISBN 978-0268040192, ISBN 0-268-04019-2).
- Orange, Donna M. (1984), Peirce's Conception of God: A Developmental Study (Peirce Studies #2), Texas Tech University Institute for Studies in Pragmaticism, Lubbock, TX, hardcover (ISBN 978-0936842028, ISBN 0-936842-02-4).
- Paavola, Sami (2006), On the Origin of Ideas: An Abductivist Approach to Discovery, University of Helsinki, Helsinki, Finland, paperback (ISBN 952-10-3486-6), PDF (ISBN 952-10-3487-4), "Eprint" (PDF). Archived from the original (PDF) on 2007-06-10. (223 KiB).
- Percy, Walker (1991), Signposts in a Strange Land, P. Samway (ed.), Farrar, Straus & Giroux, 271–91, hardcover (ISBN 978-0374263911, ISBN 0-374-26391-4). Reprinted, 2000, Picador, 432 pages, paper (ISBN 978-0312254193, ISBN 0-312-25419-9).
- Pharies, David (1985), Charles S. Peirce and the Linguistic Sign, John Benjamins Publishing Co.: catalog page, 118 pages, hardcover (ISBN 978-9027232793, ISBN 90-272-3279-2).
- Pietarinen, Ahti-Veikko (2006), Signs of Logic: Peircean Themes on the Philosophy of Language, Games, and Communication, 496 pages, Springer: catalog page, hardcover (ISBN 978-1402037283, ISBN 1-4020-3728-7).
- Potter, Vincent G.
  - (1967), Charles S. Peirce On Norms and Ideals, University of Massachusetts Press, 248 pages (ISBN 978-0870230325, ISBN 0-87023-032-8). 2nd revised edition 1996, with a new introduction by Stanlley M. Harrison, Fordham University Press, 229 pages, F.U.P.'s inter-page links are failing, catalog page hardcover, (ISBN 978-0823217090, ISBN 0-8232-1709-4), catalog page paperback (ISBN 978-0823217106, ISBN 0-8232-1710-8).
  - and Colapietro, Vincent M., ed. (1967), Peirce's Philosophical Perspectives, Fordham University Press, new edition 1996, 212 pages, F.U.P.'s inter-page links are failing, F.U.P. catalog page hardcover (ISBN 978-0823216154, ISBN 0-8232-1615-2), catalog page paperback (ISBN 978-0823216161, ISBN 0-8232-1616-0).
- Prasad, Indira (1983), Philosophy and common sense: A study in the philosophy of C. S. Peirce, S. Chand and Co. Ram Nagar, New Delhi, 263 pages. ("Indira" or "Indra"?).
- Putnam, H. (1982), "Peirce the Logician', Historia Mathematica 9, 290–301. Reprinted, pp. 252–260 in Hilary Putnam, Realism with a Human Face, Harvard University Press, Cambridge, MA, 1990, 1992 paper edition: H.U.P. catalog page (ISBN 978-0-674-74945-0, ISBN 0-674-74945-6). Excerpt consisting of article's last five pages: Eprint.
- Ransdell, Joseph
  - (1977), "Some Leading Ideas of Peirce's Semiotic", Semiotica 19, 1977, pp. 157–178. Arisbe lightly revised Eprint.
  - (1979), "The Epistemic Function of Iconicity in Perception", Studies in Peirce's Semiotic, pp. 51–66, Institute for Studies in Pragmaticism, Lubbock, TX. 2005 Arisbe revised Eprint.
  - (1980), "On the Paradigm of Experience Appropriate for Semiotic", delivered orally at a meeting of the Semiotic Society of America in Lubbock, Texas in 1980 and published in Semiotics 1980, eds. Michael Herzfeld and Margot Lenhart, Plenum Press, New York, 1982, pp. 427–438. 1998 version 2.0 Arisbe Eprint. Advocates Peircean (as opposed to Husserlian) phenomenological viewpoint.
  - (1986), "On Peirce's Conception of the Iconic Sign", in Iconicity: Essays on the Nature of Culture, Festschrift for Thomas A. Sebeok, ed. Paul Bouissac, Michael Herzfeld, and Roland Posner (Stauffenburg Verlag (1986). 1997 version 2.0 Arisbe Eprint.
  - (1989), "Teleology and the Autonomy of the Semiosis Process", presented at a conference of the International Association for Semiotic Studies (IASS) held in Barcelona and Perpignan in March–April 1989. Published in Signs of Humanity/L'homme et ses signes, v. 1, Mouton de Gruyter, 1992. Arisbe Eprint.
  - (1989), "Is Peirce a Phenomenologist?", published in French as "Peirce est-il un phénoménologue?" in Ètudes Phénoménologiques, 9-10 (1989), pp. 51–75. Arisbe English translation Eprint.
  - (1995, 1998), "Sciences as Communicational Communities", invited paper delivered orally at a meeting of the American Physical Society. Version 3.1 1998 substantially revised. Eprint.
  - (2000), "Peirce and the Socratic Tradition in Philosophy", presidential address given to the meeting of the Charles S. Peirce Society in Boston, December 28, 1999. Published in TCSPS, v. 36, n. 3 (Summer 2000). Arisbe Eprint.
  - (2002), "The Relevance Of Peircean Semiotic To Computational Intelligence Augmentation", the Proceedings version of a paper presented at the Workshop on Computational Intelligence and Semiotics, Itaú Cultural, São Paulo, Brazil, 8–9 October 2002. Eprint.
  - (2007 draft), "On the Use and Abuse of the Immediate/Dynamical Object Distinction", Arisbe Eprint.
- Raposa, Michael L. (1989), Peirce's Philosophy of Religion (Peirce Studies #5), Indiana University Press: catalog page, 180 pages, hardcover (ISBN 978-0253348333, ISBN 0-253-34833-1).
- Reilly, Francis E. (1970), Charles Peirce's Theory of Scientific Method, Fordham University Press, 200 pages, hardcover (ISBN 978-0823208807, ISBN 0-8232-0880-X).
- Rescher, Nicholas (1979), Peirce's Philosophy of Science: Critical Studies in His Theory of Induction & Scientific Method, University of Notre Dame Press (June 1979), 127 pages, paperback (ISBN 978-0268015275, ISBN 0-268-01527-9).
- Reynolds, Andrew (2002), Peirce's Scientific Metaphysics: The Philosophy of Chance, Law, & Evolution, Vanderbilt University Press: catalog page, 240 pages, hardcover (ISBN 978-0826513960, ISBN 0-8265-1396-4).
- Richmond, Gary
  - (2006), "Trikonic Analysis-Synthesis and Critical Common Sense on the Web" for the ICCS 2006 conference. Covers trikonic and "vectors", permutations of the Peircean categorial sequence. PDF Eprint.
  - (2008), "Cultural Pragmatics and the Life of the Sign" in Critical Arts, v. 22, n. 2, November 2008, Routledge, University of South Africa Press: catalog page. Contribution about Arnold Shepperson and Peirce to the special issue "Peirce Logic and Mining Safety" (Shepperson memorial issue). Routledge free-access PDF Eprint.
- Roberts, Don D. (1973), The Existential Graphs of Charles S. Peirce, Mouton and Company, The Hague, Netherlands (now Walter de Gruyter, Berlin & NY), 168 pages, hardcover (ISBN 978-90-279-2523-7, ISBN 90-279-2523-2).
- Romeo, Luigi (1977), "The Derivation of 'Semiotics' through the History of the Discipline", Semiosis, v. 6 pp. 37–50. Retraces evolution and usage of term "Semiotics" from antiquity to Locke and on up to the late 19th century when Peirce first employed it.
- Rosensohn, William L. (1974), The phenomenology of Charles S. Peirce: From the doctrine of categories to phaneroscopy, Gruner, 110 pages, (ISBN 978-9060320242, ISBN 90-6032-024-7).
- Rosenthal, Sandra B. (1994), Charles Peirce's Pragmatic Pluralism, State University of New York Press catalog page, 177 pages, hardcover (ISBN 978-0791421574, ISBN 0-7914-2157-0), paperback (ISBN 978-0791421581, ISBN 0-7914-2158-9).
- Russell, Francis C–. (1908 July), "Hints for the Elucidation of Mr. Peirce's Logical Work", The Monist v. XVIII, n. 3, pp. 406–415, The Open Court Publishing Co., Chicago, IL, for the Hegeler Institute. Google Books Eprint.
- Santaella, Lucia (1997), "The Development of Peirce's Three Types of Reasoning: Abduction, Deduction, and Induction", 6th Congress of the IASS. Eprint.
- Savan, David (1989), An Introduction to C. S. Peirce's Full System of Semiotic, Toronto Semiotic Circle Monographs No. 1., Toronto Semiotic Circle, Toronto, Canada. Revised and expanded version of Savan 1976.
- Scott, Frances Williams (2006), C. S. Peirce's System of Science: Life as a Laboratory (Peirce Studies #7), Press of Arisbe Associates, Elsah, IL, hardcover (ISBN 978-0936842127, ISBN 0-936842-12-1).
- Sebeok, Thomas Albert
  - (1976), Contributions to the Doctrine of Signs, Indiana University, 271 pages (ISBN 978-0877501947, ISBN 0-87750-194-7), and, in 1986, Rowman & Littlefield (Non NBN), 314 pages, textbook binding, (ISBN 978-0819150509, ISBN 0-8191-5050-9). Picks up where Luigi Romeo leaves off on the history of the term "Semiotic".
  - (1980), "You know my method": A juxtaposition of Charles S. Peirce and Sherlock Holmes, Gaslight Publications, 84 pages, (ISBN 978-0934468015, ISBN 0-934468-01-X).
- Seibert, Charles H. (2008), "Sayyid Qutb's Understanding of Charles Peirce", Arisbe Eprint. The sole treatment of this issue, at least in English.
- Shepperson, Arnold, published or reprinted in Critical Arts: A Journal of South-North Cultural and Media Studies, v. 22, n. 2, November 2008, special issue Peirce Logic and Mining Safety (Shepperson memorial issue), Routledge, University of South Africa Press: catalog page (see also Richmond, Gary (2008) above for highly relevant free-access article):
  - (2001), "Realism, logic and social communication: C.S. Peirce's classification of science in communication studies and journalism", major appendix to National Research Foundation: State of the Discipline, Communication Studies (South Africa). Reprinted 2008 in Critical Arts v. 22, n. 2 (see above).
  - (2005), "Safety and the Logic of Hazard: Health and safety culture as a research problem", Programme in Culture, Communication and Media Studies, University of KwaZulu-Natal, Durban 4041, client: Safety in Mines Research Advisory Council (SIMRAC), Ministry of Minerals and Energy, Pretoria and Braamfontein. An application of Peirce's economics of research. 2008 edition in Critical Arts v. 22, n. 2 (see above).
  - (2008), "An economy of impossibility: a preliminary study for an ordinal approach to research methods in cultural studies" in Critical Arts v. 22, n. 2 (see above), with preface by Eric Louw. Involving application of Peirce, Arrow, and Sen. Shepperson was working on this when he died. See also "The frustration of an unfinished conversation: a review of 'An economy of impossibility'", Julie Clare, in the same issue.
- Sheriff, John K.
  - (1989), The Fate of Meaning: Charles Peirce, Structuralism, and Literature, Princeton University Press, 168 pages, hardcover (ISBN 978-0691067629, ISBN 0-691-06762-7), paperback (ISBN 978-0691014500, ISBN 0-691-01450-7), Amazon shows P.U.P. 2007 reprint, not shown by P.U.P. catalog page.
  - (1994), Charles Peirce's Guess at the Riddle: Grounds for Human Significance, Indiana University Press: catalog page, 128 pages, hardcover (ISBN 978-0253352040, ISBN 0-253-35204-5), paperback (ISBN 978-0253208804, ISBN 0-253-20880-7).
- Shin, Sun-Joo (2002), The Iconic Logic of Peirce's Graphs, M.I.T. Press: catalog page, 220 pages, hardcover (ISBN 978-0-262-19470-9, ISBN 0-262-19470-8).
- Short, Thomas L. (Google search on all variants of T. L. Short's name in connection with Peirce.)
  - (1980a), "An Analysis of Conceptual Change" in American Philosophical Quarterly, v. 17, n. 4, October.
  - (1980b), "Peirce and the Incommensurability of Theories" in The Monist 63: 316-328.
  - (1981a), "Peirce's Concept of Final Causation" in TCSPS, v. 17, n. 4, fall.
  - (1981b), "Semeiosis and Intentionality" in TCSPS, v. 17, n. 3, summer.
  - (1982), "Life among the Legisigns" in TCSPS, v. 18, n. 4, fall.
  - (1983), "Teleology in Nature" in American Philosophical Quarterly.
  - (1984), "Some problems concerning Peirce's Conceptions of Concepts and Propositions" in TCSPS, v. 20, n. 1, winter.
  - (1986a), "David Savan's Peirce Studies" in TCSPS, v. 22, n. 2, spring.
  - (1986b), "What They Said in Amsterdam: Peirce's Semiotics Today" in Semiotica 60: 103-28.
  - (1988a), "The Growth of Symbols" in Cruzeiro semiotico 8, 81-87, Associação Portuguesa de Semiótica, Porto, Portugal.
  - (1988c), "Why we prefer Peirce to Saussure" in Semiotics 1988, Prewitt, Deely, and Haworth, eds., 124–130, Lanham, MD: University Press of America.
  - (1992), "Peirce's Semiotic Theory of the Self" in Semiotica, 91 1/2, 109–131.
  - (1994a), "David Savan's Defense of Semiotic Realism" in Semiotica 98 3/4 (1994), de Gruyter, pp. 243–263.
  - (1994b), "On Hermeticism in Semiotics" in The Peirce Seminar Papers: Annual of Semiotic Analysis: Volume II, 1994, Shapiro, ed., Haley, managing ed., Berghahn Books catalog page, pp. 231–259. Berghahn says publication year 1995.
  - (1996a), "Interpreting Peirce's Interpretant: A Response to Lalor, Liszka, and Meyers", TCSPS, v. 32, n. 4 fall.
  - (1997), "Hypostatic Abstraction in Self-Consciousness", The Rule of Reason: The Philosophy of Charles Sanders Peirce, Brunning & Forster, eds. University of Toronto Press, pp. 289–308.
  - (1998a), "The Discovery of Scientific Aims and Methods", American Catholic Philosophical Quarterly v. 72, n. 2: 293-312.
  - (1998b), "Jakobson's Problematic Appropriation of Peirce" in The Peirce Seminar Papers, Shapiro, ed., v. 3. Peter Lang: catalog page.
  - (1999), "Teleology and Linguistic Change" in The Peirce Seminar Papers, Shapiro and Haley, eds. v. 4. Berghahn Books: catalog page.
  - (1999/2000), "Peirce on Meaning and Translation" in La Traduzione, Athanor anno 10, n. 2, Bari, Italy.
  - (2000a), "Peirce on the Aim of Inquiry: Another Reading of 'Fixation'", TCSPS, v. 36, n. 1, winter 2000, pp. 1–23.
  - (2000b), "Was Peirce a Weak Foundationalist?", TCSPS, v. 36, n. 4, fall 2000, pp. 503–528.
  - (2001), "The Conservative Pragmatism of Charles Peirce", Modern Age 43:4, Fall 2001. First Principles Eprint.
  - (2002), "Robin on Perception and Sentiment in Peirce" in TCSPS, v. 38, n. 1/2, winter/spring, pp. 267–282.
  - (2004), "The Development of Peirce's Theory of Signs" in The Cambridge Companion to Peirce, Cheryl Misak, ed., Cambridge U. P.
  - (2007), Peirce's Theory of Signs, Cambridge University Press: catalog page, hardback (ISBN 9780521843201). Symposium on the book in Transactions of the Charles S. Peirce Society v. 43, n. 4, Fall 2007. Eprint.
- Skagestad, Peter
  - (1981), The Road of Inquiry, Charles Peirce's Pragmatic Realism, Columbia University Press: catalog page, New York, NY, 261 pages, cloth (ISBN 0-231-05004-6).
  - (1993), "Thinking With Machines: Intelligence Augmentation, Evolutionary Epistemology, and Semiotic" in The Journal of Social and Evolutionary Systems, v. 16, n. 2, pp. 157–180, Arisbe Eprint. Peirce, Popper, and Engelbart.
  - (1998), "Peirce, Virtuality, and Communication", from the Twentieth World Congress of Philosophy, in Boston, Massachusetts from August 10–15, 1998. Paedeia Eprint.
- Smyth, Richard A. (1997), Reading Peirce Reading, Rowman & Littlefield Publishers, Inc.: catalog page, 336 (ix + 327) pages, hardcover (ISBN 978-0847684328, ISBN 0-8476-8432-6), paperback (ISBN 978-0847684335, ISBN 0-8476-8433-4).
- Sobrinho, Blasco Jos (2001), Signs, Solidarities & Sociology: Charles S. Peirce and the Pragmatics of Globalization, Rowman & Littlefield Publishers, Inc.: catalog page, hardcover (ISBN 978-0847691784, ISBN 0-8476-9178-0), paperback (ISBN 978-0847691791, ISBN 0-8476-9179-9).
- Sorrell, Kory Spencer (2004), Representative Practices: Peirce, Pragmatism, and Feminist Epistemology, Fordham University Press: catalog page, 228 pages, hardcover (ISBN 978-0823223541, ISBN 0-8232-2354-X).
- Sowa, John F. (2006), "Peirce's Contributions to the 21st Century", Conceptual Structures: Inspiration and Application, LNAI 4068, Springer, Berlin, pp. 54–69. Sowa PDF Eprint.
- Spinks, C. W. (1992), Peirce and Triadomania: A Walk in the Semiotic Wilderness, Mouton de Gruyter: catalog page, 256 pages, hardcover (ISBN 978-3110126334, ISBN 3-11-012633-8).
- Stewart, Arthur Franklin (1994, 1997), Elements of Knowledge: Pragmatism, Logic, and Inquiry, first published as Elements of Knowledge: Pragmaticism and Philosophy of Knowledge, Kendall/Hunt Publishing Co., Dubuque (IA), 1994, xvi + 135 pages, paperback (ISBN 0-8403-9465-9), revised Sub edition (November 1997) Vanderbilt University Press: catalog page, 145 pages, hardcover (ISBN 978-0826513038, ISBN 0-8265-1303-4).
- Taborsky, Edwina (1998), Architectonics of semiosis, Macmillan, 1998, 202 pages, hardcover (ISBN 978-0312216573, ISBN 0-312-21657-2).
- Thompson, Manley Hawn (1973), The pragmatic philosophy of C. S. Peirce, 317 pages, University Of Chicago Press, IL.
- Trout, Lara (2010), The Politics of Survival : Peirce, Affectivity, and Social Criticism, Fordham U. Press catalog page, 304 pages, paperback (ISBN 9780823232956).
- Turley, Peter T. (1977), Peirce's Cosmology, Philosophical Library, 126 pages, hardcover (ISBN 978-0802222084, ISBN 0-8022-2208-0).
- Tursman, Richard Allen (1987), Peirce's theory of scientific discovery: A system of logic conceived as semiotic (Peirce Studies #3), Indiana University Press, 160 pages, (ISBN 978-0253342959, ISBN 0-253-34295-3).
- Vehkavaara, Tommi
  - (2001), "The outline of Peirce's classification of sciences (1902–1911)", "Eprint" (PDF). (11.4 KiB). Chart.
  - (2003), "Development of Peirce's classification of sciences – three stages: 1889, 1898, 1903", "Eprint" (PDF). (19.4 KiB). Charts.
- Ward, Roger (2001), Peirce and Politics, Sage Publications, reprint, originally appeared as article in: Philosophy & Social Criticism, v. 27, n. 3, pp. 67–90 (2001), P&SC abstract.
- Wennerberg, Hjalmar (1962), The Pragmatism of C. S. Peirce, An Analytical Study, Gleerup, Lund, Sweden, 195 pages.
- Wible, James R. (2009) "Economics, Christianity, and Creative Evolution: Peirce, Newcomb, and Ely and the Issues Surrounding the Creation of the American Economic Association in the 1880s", Arisbe. Condensation of several chapters from a longer project. Wible is an economist at the Whittemore School of Business and Economics, U. of New Hampshire.PDF Eprint.
- Yu, Chong Ho ("Alex")
  - (1994), "Abduction? Deduction? Induction? Is there a Logic of Exploratory Data Analysis?", presented at the Annual Meeting of the American Educational Research Association (New Orleans, LA, April 4–8, 1994, Internet Archive Eprint.
  - (2005?), "Inference to the Best Explanation and Dembski Significance Testing Model for the Intelligent Design Argument", Internet Archive "Eprint" (PDF). Archived from the original on 2006-04-29. (78.8 KiB).
- Zalamea, Fernando (2001), "Peirce's logic of continuity: Existential graphs and non-Cantorian continuum", Review of Modern Logic, v. 9, n. 1-2, pp. 115–162, Project Euclid open access Eprint.
- Zeman, John Jay (1983, 1986), "Peirce's Philosophy of Logic", preparation of material for this paper was for a conference on "The Birth of Mathematical Logic" at Fredonia College, SUNY in March 1983. Published in TCSPS, v. 22 (1986), pp. 1–22. Eprint.
- Zuchero, John (2007), The Practical Peirce: An Introduction to the Triadic Continuum Implemented as a Computer Data Structure, iUniverse, Inc., 252 pages, paperback (ISBN 978-0595441129, ISBN 0-595-44112-2).
