= Fernando Zalamea =

Colombian mathematician

Fernando Zalamea Traba (Bogota, 28 February 1959) is a Colombian mathematician, essayist, critic, philosopher and popularizer, known by his contributions to the philosophy of mathematics, being the creator of the synthetic philosophy of mathematics. He is the author of around twenty books and is one of the world's leading experts on the mathematical and philosophical work of Alexander Grothendieck, as well as in the logical work of Charles S. Peirce.

Currently, he is a full professor in the Department of Mathematics of the National University of Colombia, where he has established a mathematical school, primarily through his ongoing seminar of epistemology, history and philosophy of mathematics, which he conducted for eleven years at the university. He is also known for his creative, critical, and constructive teaching of mathematics. Zalamea has supervised approximately 50 thesis projects at the undergraduate, master's and doctoral levels in various fields, including mathematics, philosophy, logic, category theory, semiology, medicine, culture, among others. Since 2018, he has been an honorary member of the Colombian Academy of Physical Exact Sciences and Natural. In 2016, he was recognized as one of the 100 most outstanding contemporary interdisciplinary global minds by "100 Global Minds, the most daring cross-disciplinary thinkers in the world," being the only Latin American included in this recognition.
