= Sun-Joo Shin =

Korean-American philosopher

Sun-Joo Shin is a Korean-American philosopher known for her work on diagrammatic reasoning in mathematical logic, including the validity of reasoning using Venn diagrams, the existential graphs of Charles Sanders Peirce, and the philosophical distinction between diagrammatic and symbolic reasoning. She is a professor of philosophy at Yale University.

== Education and career ==
Shin was an undergraduate in Korea. There, she became interested in the philosophy of art and the work of Maurice Merleau-Ponty, but did not have the funding for graduate study in France. Instead, she obtained a fellowship to Ohio State University, but transferred to Stanford University a year later, in 1987, after earning a master's degree at Ohio State. At Stanford, under the influence of Jon Barwise and John Etchemendy, her interests shifted to logic, and by 1991 she had completed her dissertation, Valid reasoning and visual representation, under the supervision of Etchemendy.

Shin's first faculty position was at the University of Notre Dame. In 2002 she moved from Notre Dame to her present position at Yale University.

== Personal life ==
Shin is married to Henry E. Smith, the Fessenden Professor of Law at Harvard University.

== Books ==
Shin's books include:

- The Logical Status of Diagrams (Cambridge University Press, 1995)
- The Iconic Logic of Peirce’s Graphs (MIT Press, 2002)
- Visual Reasoning with Diagrams (edited with Amirouche Moktefi, Birkhäuser, 2013)
