= William Hatcher Davis =

American philosopher (1939–2017)

- Born: 5 January 1939; Lincoln, Tennessee, U.S
- Died: 13 May 2017 (aged 78); Alexander City, Alabama, U.S
- Education: Abilene Christian University; Rice University
- Scientific career
- Fields: Philosophy
- Workplaces: Auburn University
- Thesis: The Philosophy of C.S Pierce (1965)

William Hatcher Davis (5 January 1939 – 13 May 2017) was Professor of Philosophy at Auburn University, where he taught for 47 years and served as Chair of the Department of Philosophy. He was interested in the philosophy of religion, ethics, epistemology, and pragmatism. Among his publications are The Freewill Question (The Hague: Martinus Nijhoff, 1971), Peirce's Epistemology (The Hague: Martinus Nijhoff, 1972), and "Why be Moral?" (Philosophical Inquiry 13(3–4): 1–21, 1991).

Davis had a B.A. and M.A. from Abilene Christian University and a Ph.D. from Rice University.
