= Accidentalism (philosophy) =

Philosophical rejection of causal closure of physical determinism

In philosophy, accidentalism denies the causal closure of physical determinism and maintains that events can succeed one another haphazardly or by chance (not in the mathematical but in the popular sense). Opponents of accidentalism maintain that what seems to be a chance occurrence is actually the result of one or more causes that remain unknown due only to a lack of investigation. Charles Sanders Peirce used the term tychism (from τύχη, chance) for theories that make chance an objective factor in the process of the Universe.

In ethics the term is used, like indeterminism, to denote the theory that mental change cannot always be ascribed to previously ascertained psychological states, and that volition is not causally related to the motives involved. An example of this theory is the doctrine of the liberum arbitrium indifferentiae ("liberty of indifference"), according to which the choice of two or more alternative possibilities is affected neither by contemporaneous data of an ethical or prudential kind nor by crystallized habit (character).

== See also ==
- Necessitarianism
- Indeterminacy
