= Classification of the sciences (Peirce) =

The philosopher Charles Sanders Peirce (1839–1914) did considerable work over a period of years on the classification of sciences (including mathematics). His classifications are of interest both as a map for navigating his philosophy and as an accomplished polymath's survey of research in his time. Peirce himself was well grounded and produced work in many research fields, including logic, mathematics, statistics, philosophy, spectroscopy, gravimetry, geodesy, chemistry, and experimental psychology.

== Classifications ==
Philosophers have done little work on classification of the sciences and mathematics since Peirce's time. Noting Peirce's "important" contribution, Denmark's Birger Hjørland commented: "There is not today (2005), to my knowledge, any organized research program about the classification of the sciences in any discipline or in any country". As Miksa (1998) writes, the "interest for this question largely died in the beginning of the 20th century". It is not clear whether Hjørland includes the classification of mathematics in that characterization.

=== Taxa ===
In 1902 and 1903 Peirce elaborates classifications of the sciences in:

- "A Detailed Classification of the Sciences" in Minute Logic (Feb.–Apr. 1902), Collected Papers of Charles Sanders Peirce (CP) v. 1, paragraphs 203–283
- July 1902 application to the Carnegie institution (MS L75)
- "An Outline Classification of the Sciences (CP 1.180-202) in his "A Syllabus of Certain Topics in Logic" (1903), wherein his classifications of the sciences take more or less their final form

However, only in the "Detailed Classification" and the Carnegie application does he discuss the taxa which he used, which were inspired by the biological taxa of Louis Agassiz.

Taxa of scientific departments
Name	Characterization ("A Detailed Classification of the Sciences", Feb.-Apr. 1902)	Characterization (Carnegie application, July 1902)	Examples (1902 examples are the Carnegie application)
Branch of science	Branches differ in fundamental purposes.	Throughout a branch, there is one same animating motive (though researchers in a branch's different classes seem to live in different worlds).	Peirce's three branches (1903): Science of Discovery. Science of Review. Practical Science.
Class of science	Classes differ radically in observation. Observations in one class (say physical & psychological sciences) cannot yield the kind of information which another class (say pure mathematics) requires of observation.	Throughout a class, researchers feel that they inquire into the same great subject (as kinds of inquiry differ but interconnect).	Peirce's three classes of discovery science: Pure mathematics. Cenoscopic philosophy. The special sciences.
Order of science	Two orders within one class or subclass may differ hierarchically, one more general, the other more specialized.	Throughout an order, researchers pursue the same general kind of inquiry (but deal with different kinds of conceptions).	Peirce's 1902 example of various orders: General Physics. Biology. Geology.
Family of science	Has special name, journal, society. Studies one group of facts. Researchers understand one another in a general way and naturally associate together.	Throughout a family, researchers have the same general conceptions (but differ in skills).	Peirce's 1902 example of various families: Astronomy. Geognosy.
Genus of science	"I can give no such definitions of genera and species, not having carried my classification of the sciences to these minutiae" (of definitions of taxa; he does use the genus taxon).	Throughout the genus, researchers have the same skills (but differ in acquaintance with facts in detail).	Peirce's 1902 example of various genera: Optics. Electrics.
Species of science	"I can give no such definitions of genera and species, not having carried my classification of the sciences to these minutiae" (of definitions of taxa; he does use the genus taxon).	The species is the narrowest division still having societies and journals, each researcher is thoroughly well qualified in all parts of it.	Peirce's 1902 example of various species: Entomology. Ichthyology.
Variety of science	"I can give no such definitions of genera and species, not having carried my classification of the sciences to these minutiae" (of definitions of taxa; he does use the genus taxon).	Researchers devote lives to a variety of science, but not so numerously as to support distinct societies and journals.	Peirce's 1902 example of various varieties: Study of Kant. Study of Spinoza.

=== Sciences ===
In 1902, he divided science into Theoretical and Practical. Theoretical Science consisted of Science of Discovery and Science of Review, the latter of which he also called "Synthetic Philosophy", a name taken from the title of the vast work, written over many years, by Herbert Spencer. Then, in 1903, he made it a three-way division: Science of Discovery, Science of Review, and Practical Science. In 1903 he characterized Science of Review as:

...arranging the results of discovery, beginning with digests, and going on to endeavor to form a philosophy of science. Such is the nature of Humboldt's Cosmos, of Comte's Philosophie positive, and of Spencer's Synthetic Philosophy. The classification of the sciences belongs to this department.

Peirce had already for a while divided the Sciences of Discovery into:

(1) Mathematics – draws necessary conclusions about hypothetical objects
(2) Cenoscopy – philosophy about positive phenomena in general, such as confront a person at every waking moment, rather than special classes, and not settling theoretical issues by special experiences or experiments
(3) Idioscopy – the special sciences, about special classes of positive phenomena, and settling theoretical issues by special experiences or experiments

Thus Peirce ends up framing two fields each of which is philosophy in a sense: cenoscopic philosophy which precedes the special sciences, and synthetic philosophy (that is to say, science of review), which does take advantage of the results of all the sciences of discovery and develops, for instance, classifications of the sciences.

Peirce opens his 1903 classification (the "Syllabus" classification) with a concise statement of method and purpose:

This classification, which aims to base itself on the principal affinities of the objects classified, is concerned not with all possible sciences, nor with so many branches of knowledge, but with sciences in their present condition, as so many businesses of groups of living men. It borrows its idea from Comte's classification; namely, the idea that one science depends upon another for fundamental principles, but does not furnish such principles to that other. It turns out that in most cases the divisions are trichotomic; the First of the three members relating to universal elements or laws, the Second arranging classes of forms and seeking to bring them under universal laws, the Third going into the utmost detail, describing individual phenomena and endeavoring to explain them. But not all the divisions are of this character....

The following table is based mostly on Peirce's 1903 classification, which was more or less the final form. But see after the table for discussion of his later remarks on the divisions of logic.

Classification of the Sciences of Discovery
Classes
Subclasses
Orders
Other Taxa (suborders, families, etc.)
I. Mathematics.

The scientific study of hypotheses which it first frames and then traces to their consequences.
A. Mathematics of Logic.
B. Mathematics of Discrete Series.
C. Mathematics of Continua and Pseudocontinua.
(Note: By "continuum" Peirce meant, until 1908, a continuum of instants (as he called them) beyond any Cantorian aleph's worth. He held that such a continuum was the true subject matter of that which we now call topology, and that the reals, the complex reals, etc., constituted pseudocontinua.)
II. Cenoscopy,
or Philosophy.

(Philosophia Prima, First Philosophy.)

About positive phenomena in general, such as are available to every person at every waking moment, and not about special classes of phenomena. Does not resort to special experiences or experiments in order to settle theoretical questions.
Epistêmy
(1902 classification only).
A. Phenomenology (or Categorics or Phaneroscopy).
(Includes the study of the cenopythagorean categories: Firstness, Secondness, and Thirdness).
B. Normative Science.
i. Esthetics. (Study of the good, the admirable. Peirce reserved the spelling "aesthetics" for the study of artistic beauty.)
ii. Ethics. (Study of right and wrong).
iii. Logic
(or Semiotic or Formal Semiotic). (Study of true and false.)

(The presuppositions of reason are the locus of Peirce's truth theory and his fallibilism.)

1. Speculative Grammar
(or Philosophical or Universal Grammar)
(or Stechiology)
(Includes the classification of signs).
2. Critic
(or Logical Critic, Critical Logic, or Logic Proper).
(Includes study of the modes of inference: abduction, induction, and deduction).
3. Methodeutic
(or Speculative Rhetoric,
or Universal or Philosophical Rhetoric).
(Is the locus of Peirce's Pragmatism, and includes study of scientific method).
C. Metaphysics.
i. Ontology or General. (Locus of Peirce's Scholastic Realism.)
ii. Psychical or Religious.
1. God.
2. freedom (& destiny).
3. immortality.
iii. Physical. (Locus of Peirce's Objective Idealism and his doctrines that physical space, time, and law are continuous, and that chance, mechanical necessity, and creative love are physically real and involve corresponding modes of universal evolution.)
Theôric (1902 classification only).
Peirce: "...[theôrics] only resort to special observation to settle some minute details, concerning which the testimony of general experience is possibly insufficient."
Chronotheory &
Topotheory
(1902 only)
III. Idioscopy,
or the Special Sciences.

About special classes of positive phenomena. Resorts to special experience or experiments in order to settle theoretical questions.
[?]. Physical.
i. Nomological or General.
i. Molar Physics.
Dynamics &
Gravitation.
ii. Molecular Physics.
Elaterics (elasticity, expansibility) &
Thermodynamics.
iii. Ethereal Physics.
Optics &
Electrics.
ii. Classificatory.
Peirce in the 1903 Syllabus classification: "Classificatory physics seems, at present, as a matter of fact, to be divided, quite irrationally and most unequally, into i, Crystallography; ii, Chemistry; iii, Biology."
i. Crystallography
ii. Chemistry.
1. Physical.
2. Organic.

Aliphatic & Aromatic.

3. Inorganic
(elements, atomic weights, compounds, periodicity, etc.)

iii. Biology.
1. Physiology.
2. Anatomy.
iii. Descriptive.
Geognosy & Astronomy.
[?]. Psychical.
i. Nomological Psychics,
or Psychology.
i. Introspectional.
ii. Experimental.
iii. Physiological.
iv. Child.
ii. Classificatory Psychics,
or Ethnology.
1. Special Psychology.
1. Individual Psychology. 2. Psychical Heredity.
3. Abnormal Psychology. 4. Mob Psychology.
5. Race Psychology. 6. Animal Psychology.
2. Linguistics.
1. Word Linguistics.
2. Grammar ("should be a comparative science of forms of composition")
3. Ethnology.
1. Ethnology of Social Developments, customs, laws, religion, and tradition.
2. Ethnology of Technology.
iii. Descriptive Psychics,
or History.
1. History proper.
2. Biography ("which at present is rather a mass of lies than a science")
3. Criticism
1. Literary criticism
2. Art criticism (criticism of military operations, criticism of architecture, etc.)

==== Logic's divisions later ====
In a piece which the Collected Papers editors called "Phaneroscopy" and dated as 1906, Peirce wrote (CP 4.9):

...I extend logic to embrace all the necessary principles of semeiotic, and I recognize a logic of icons, and a logic of indices, as well as a logic of symbols; and in this last I recognize three divisions: Stecheotic (or stoicheiology), which I formerly called Speculative Grammar; Critic, which I formerly called Logic; and Methodeutic, which I formerly called Speculative Rhetoric

Thus the three main 1903 departments of logic were now sub-departments of the study of the logic of symbols.

In a letter to J. H. Kehler, printed in The New Elements of Mathematics v.3, p. 207 and dated 1911, Peirce wrote:

I have now sketched my doctrine of Logical Critic, skipping a good deal. I recognize two other parts of Logic. One which may be called Analytic examines the nature of thought, not psychologically but simply to define what it is to doubt, to believe, to learn, etc., and then to base critic on these definitions is my real method, though in this letter I have taken the third branch of logic, Methodeutic, which shows how to conduct an inquiry. This is what the greater part of my life has been devoted to, though I base it upon Critic.

Peirce's revisions of logic's divisions
Peirce in 1902, 1903: Logic (begins on general level with presuppositions of reason, logical conception of mind, nature of belief & doubt, etc.). A. Stechiology (classes of signs & their combinations). B. Critic (modes of argument). C. Methodeutic (methods of inquiry).	Peirce in 1906: Logic. A. Logic of icons. B. Logic of indices. C. Logic of symbols. C1. Stechiotic. C2. Critic. C3. Methodeutic.	Peirce in 1911: Logic. A. Analytic (what it is to doubt, to believe, to learn). B. Critic. C. Methodeutic.

There in 1911 Peirce does not mention the 1906 division into logics of icons, indices and symbols. Critic and Methodeutic appear, as in 1902 and 1903, as the second and third main departments of logic. Analytic is now the first department and the word "Stechiology" goes unused. He includes in Analytic the consideration of issues which, back in his 1902 Carnegie Institute application, he had discussed in sections on logic with headings such as "Presuppositions of Logic" and "On the Logical Conception of Mind" that he had placed before the sections on logic's departments (stechiology, critic, and methodeutic).

On the question of the relationship between Stechiology and the Analytic that seems to have replaced it, note that, in Draft D of Memoir 15 in his 1902 Carnegie Institute application, Peirce said that stechiology, also called grammatica speculativa, amounts to an Erkenntnisslehre, a theory of cognition, provided that that theory is stripped of matter irrelevant and inadmissible in philosophical logic, irrelevant matter such as all truths (for example, the association of ideas) established by psychologists, insofar as the special science of psychology depends on logic, not vice versa. In that same Carnegie Institute application as in many other places, Peirce treated belief and doubt as issues of philosophical logic apart from psychology.
