= Posi =

Posi, POSI, or pozi can refer to:

== Engineering ==
- Pozidriv, a type of screw head and screwdriver
- Positraction, a limited-slip differential for Chevrolets

== Music ==
- Posi music, or positive music.
- Positive hardcore, a subgenre of hardcore punk

== Medicine ==
- The "position of safe immobilization" used when immobilizing a hand with a splint or cast

== Other ==
- Posi, Nigeria, a settlement in Badagry Division, Lagos State in Nigeria
- Posi or Pusai, a Christian martyr

== See also ==
- Positive (disambiguation)
