= Trichotomy (philosophy) =

Division into three categories

A trichotomy is a three-way classificatory division pursued by some philosophers.

== History ==
Important trichotomies discussed by Aquinas include the causal principles (agent, patient, act), the potencies for the intellect (imagination, cogitative power, and memory and reminiscence), and the acts of the intellect (concept, judgment, reasoning), with all of those rooted in Aristotle; also the transcendentals of being (unity, truth, goodness) and the requisites of the beautiful (wholeness, harmony, radiance).

Kant expounded a table of judgments involving four three-way alternatives, in regard to (1) Quantity, (2) Quality, (3) Relation, (4) Modality, and, based thereupon, a table of four categories, named by the terms just listed, and each with three subcategories. Kant also adapted the Thomistic acts of intellect in his trichotomy of higher cognition—(a) understanding, (b) judgment, (c) reason—which he correlated with his adaptation in the soul's capacities—(a) cognitive faculties, (b) feeling of pleasure or displeasure, and (c) faculty of desire—of Tetens's trichotomy of feeling, understanding, and will. In his Logic (113) Kant notes that all "polytomy are empirical" and "cannot be taught in logic".

Hegel held that a thing's or idea's internal contradiction leads in a dialectical process to a new synthesis that makes better sense of the contradiction. The process is sometimes described as thesis, antithesis, synthesis. It is instanced across a pattern of trichotomies (e.g. being-nothingness-becoming, immediate-mediate-concrete, abstract-negative-concrete); such trichotomies are not just three-way classificatory divisions; they involve trios of elements functionally interrelated in a process. They are often called triads (but 'triad' does not have that as a fixed sense in philosophy generally).

Charles Sanders Peirce built his philosophy on trichotomies and triadic relations and processes, and framed the "Reduction Thesis" that every predicate is essentially either monadic (quality), dyadic (relation of reaction or resistance), or triadic (representational relation), and never genuinely and irreducibly tetradic or larger.

== Examples ==
Plato's 3 parts of man	Nous (mind, intellect). Psyche (soul). Soma (body).
Plato's 3 transcendentals	Truth (logic, verum). Goodness (ethics, bonum). Beauty (aesthetics, pulchrum).
Plato's tripartite soul	Logistikon (logical, rational). Thymoeides (spirited, various animal qualities). Epithymetikon (appetitive, volitive, libidinous, desiring).
Aristotle's 3 kinds of soul	Threptike (nutritive, vegetative). Aisthetike (sensitive, animal). Noetike (rational, human).
Aristotle's 3 main modes of persuasion	Ethos. Pathos. Logos.
Plotinus' three principles (3rd century CE)	The One. Nous (mind, intellect). Psyche (soul).
Shema's 3 elements of man	1] לב (lev) /Kardia (heart). 2] נפׁש (nephesh) /Psyche (soul). 3] מְאֹד (me'od) /Dynamis (power)
Saint Paul's tripartite nature of humanity (I Thes. 5:23)	Pneuma (spirit). Psyche (soul). Soma (body). (Paul uses alternative concepts in other passages: kardia [heart], eso kai exo anthropos [inner and outer human being]; nous [mind]; suneidesis [conscience]; sarx [flesh]).
Valentinian gnosticism's three classes of man (2nd century CE)	the pneumatici, the psychici, and the hylici
Saint Augustine's 3 Laws	Divine Law. Natural Law. Temporal, Positive, or Human Law.
Saint Augustine's 3 features of the soul (5th century CE)	Intellect. Will. Memory. (Saint John of the Cross, OCD follows this also, but may erroneously identify them as 3 distinct powers.)
Saint Albertus Magnus' 3 Universals	Ante rem (Idea in God's mind). In re (potential or actual in things). Post rem (mentally abstracted).
Saint Thomas Aquinas, O.P.'s 3 causal principles (based in Aristotle)	Agent. Patient. Act.
Aquinas' 3 potencies for intellect (based in Aristotle)	Imagination. Cogitative power (or, in animals, instinct). Memory (and, in humans, reminiscence).
Aquinas' 3 acts of intellect (based in Aristotle)	Conception. Judgment. Reasoning.
Aquinas' 3 transcendentals of being	Unity. Truth. Goodness.
Aquinas' 3 requisites for the beautiful	Wholeness or perfection. Harmony or due proportion. Radiance.
Sir Francis Bacon's 3 Tables	Presence. Absence. Degree.
Bacon's 3 faculties of mind	Memory. Reason. Imagination.
Bacon's 3 branches of knowledge	History. Philosophy. Poetry. (Inspired the figurative system of human knowledge of Diderot and d'Alembert.)
Thomas Hobbes' 3 Fields	Physics. Moral Philosophy. Civil Philosophy.
John Dryden's 3 ways of transferring	Metaphrase. Paraphrase. Imitation.
Christian Wolff's 3 special metaphysics	Rational psychology. Rational cosmology. Rational theology.
Kant's 3 faculties of soul	Faculties of knowledge. Feeling of pleasure or displeasure. Faculty of desire (which Kant regarded also as the will).
Kant's 3 higher faculties of cognition	Understanding. Judgment. Reason.
Kant's 3 judgments of quantity	Universal. Particular. Singular
Kant's 3 categories of quantity	Unity. Plurality. Totality
Kant's 3 judgments of quality	Affirmative. Negative. Infinite
Kant's 3 categories of quality	Reality. Negation. Limitation.
Kant's 3 judgments of relation	Categorical. Hypothetical. Disjunctive.
Kant's 3 categories of relation	Inherence and subsistence. Causality and dependence. Community. In other words: Substance and accident. Cause and effect. Reciprocity.
Kant's 3 judgments of modality	Problematical. Assertoric. Apodictic
Kant's 3 categories of modality	Possibility. Existence. Necessity
Johannes Nikolaus Tetens's 3 powers of mind	Feeling. Understanding. Will.
Hannah Arendt's vita activa	Labor, Work, Action
Hegel's 3 Spirits	Subjective Spirit. Objective Spirit. Absolute Spirit.
Søren Kierkegaard's 3 stages	Aesthetic. Ethical. Religious.
Charles Sanders Peirce's 3 categories	Quality of feeling. Reaction, resistance. Representation, mediation.
C. S. Peirce's 3 universes of experience	Ideas. Brute fact. Habit (habit-taking).
C. S. Peirce's 3 orders of philosophy	Phenomenology. Normative sciences. Metaphysics.
C. S. Peirce's 3 normatives	The good (esthetic). The right (ethical). The true (logical).
C. S. Peirce's 3 semiotic elements	Sign (representamen). Object. Interpretant.
C. S. Peirce's 3 grades of conceptual clearness	By familiarity. Of definition's parts. Of conceivable practical implications.
C. S. Peirce's 3 active principles in the cosmos	Spontaneity, absolute chance. Mechanical necessity. Creative love.
Gottlob Frege's 3 realms of sense	The external, public, physical. The internal, private, mental. The Platonic, ideal but objective (to which sentences refer).
Sigmund Freud's structural model	Id, ego, and superego (das „Es“, das „Ich“, das „Über-Ich“)
Edmund Husserl's 3 Reductions	Phenomenological. Eidetic. Religious.
R. Steiner more threefold aspects.	Body, soul and spirit. Imagination, inspiration and intuition.
Korzybski's 3 types of life	Chemical-binder (i.e. plants). Space-binder (i.e. mammals). Time-binder (i.e. humans). Each one up the scale requires the previous one.
James Joyce's 3 aesthetic stages	Arrest (by wholeness). Fascination (by harmony). Enchantment (by radiance).
Jacques Lacan's 3 orders	Real, Symbolic, and Imaginary
Karl Popper's 3 worlds	Physical things and processes. Subjective human experience. Culture and objective knowledge
Louis Zukofsky's 3 aesthetic elements	Shape. Rhythm. Style.
Maurice Merleau-Ponty's 3 fields	Physical. Vital. Human.
Maurice Merleau-Ponty's 3 categories	Quantity. Order. Meaning.
Eric Berne's transactional analysis (1960s)	Parent, Adult, Child
Alan Watts' 3 world views	Life as machine (Western). Life as organism (Chinese). Life as drama (Indian).

== See also ==
- Balanced ternary
- Dichotomy
- Epistemological pluralism
- Rule of three (writing)
- Trilemma
- Trinity
- Tripartite motto

== Notes ==
§The list of trichotomies featuring different philosophers was initially influenced by Herb O. Buckland's List which was placed on the Wikipedia years ago but subsequently removed because a complaint was raised about credit not being given to the original author. The original list is here: https://www.threesology.org/3s-poster-5.php. Credit needs to be given where it is due.
