= Tychism =

American philosophy

Tychism (Greek: τύχη, lit. 'chance') is a thesis proposed by the American philosopher Charles Sanders Peirce that holds that absolute chance, or indeterminism, is a real factor operative in the universe. This doctrine forms a central part of Peirce's comprehensive evolutionary cosmology. It may be considered both the direct opposite of Albert Einstein's oft quoted dictum that: "God does not play dice with the universe" and an early philosophical anticipation of Werner Heisenberg's uncertainty principle.

== The thesis ==
In his theory of tychism, Peirce sought to deny the central position of the doctrine of necessity which maintains that "the state of things existing at any time, together with certain immutable laws, completely determine the state of things at every other time." One of the principal arguments of the necessitarians is that their position involves a presupposition of all science. Peirce attacks this idea asserting: "To 'postulate' a proposition is no more than to hope it is true." Thus an avenue is opened up allowing the entry of chance as a fundamental and absolute entity.

Peirce does not, of course, assert that there is no law in the universe. On the contrary, he maintains that an absolutely chance world would be a contradiction and thus impossible. Complete lack of order is itself a sort of order. The position he advocates is rather that there are in the universe both regularities and irregularities.

To explain the presence of such a universal "law" Peirce proposes a cosmological theory of evolution in which law develops out of chance. The hypothesis that out of irregularity, regularity constantly evolves seemed to him to have decided advantages not the least being its explanation of "why laws are not precisely or always obeyed, for what is still in a process of evolution can not be supposed to be absolutely fixed."

In an article published in The Monist for January, 1891, I endeavored to show what ideas ought to form the warp of a system of philosophy, and particularly emphasized that of absolute chance. In the number of April, 1892, I argued further in favor of that way of thinking, which it will be convenient to christen tychism (from tyché, chance). A serious student of philosophy will be in no haste to accept or reject this doctrine; but he will see in it one of the chief attitudes which speculative thought may take, feeling that it is not for an individual, nor for an age, to pronounce upon a fundamental question of philosophy. That is a task for a whole era to work out. I have begun by showing that tychism must give birth to an evolutionary cosmology, in which all the regularities of nature and of mind are regarded as products of growth, and to a Schelling-fashioned idealism which holds matter to be mere specialized and partially deadened mind." – C. S. Peirce, "The Law of Mind", 1892.

=== Underpinnings ===
Attempting to provide an explanation of some of the more general observable traits of the universe, Peirce formulates four reasons in support of his hypothesis:

1. Growth and increasing complexity
2. Variety and diversity
3. Regularity (laws of nature)
4. Mind/consciousness/feeling

He then asks us to consider how these features could possibly be explained by a strictly determined, mechanistic theory of the way of all things.

== Evolution ==
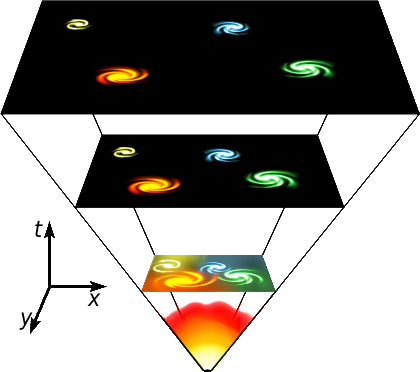
Evolution begins

Peirce very pointedly observed that all the scientifically viable theories of evolution are based on tychistic formulations.

Herbert Spencer had argued that evolution was an inevitable upwards progress driven by the law of the conservation of energy. Peirce rejected this idea, pointing out that energy conservation, like other laws of classical physics, is time-symmetric. Turning to Darwin he points out that the fundamental driver of his theory is accidental variation, noting that "Darwinian evolution is evolution by the operation of chance, and the destruction of bad results." Even the catastrophism of Clarence King and others, which postulates an acceleration in evolutionary change via sudden environmental dislocations, naturally falls under the rubric of tychism.

This evolutionary aspect of tychism compels Peirce to expand Darwin's view to a cosmological level, sending its operations back to the origin of the universe under the regulative principle of his synechism.

== See also ==
- Accidentalism
- Panpsychism
