= Charles Sanders Peirce =

American scientist (1839–1914)

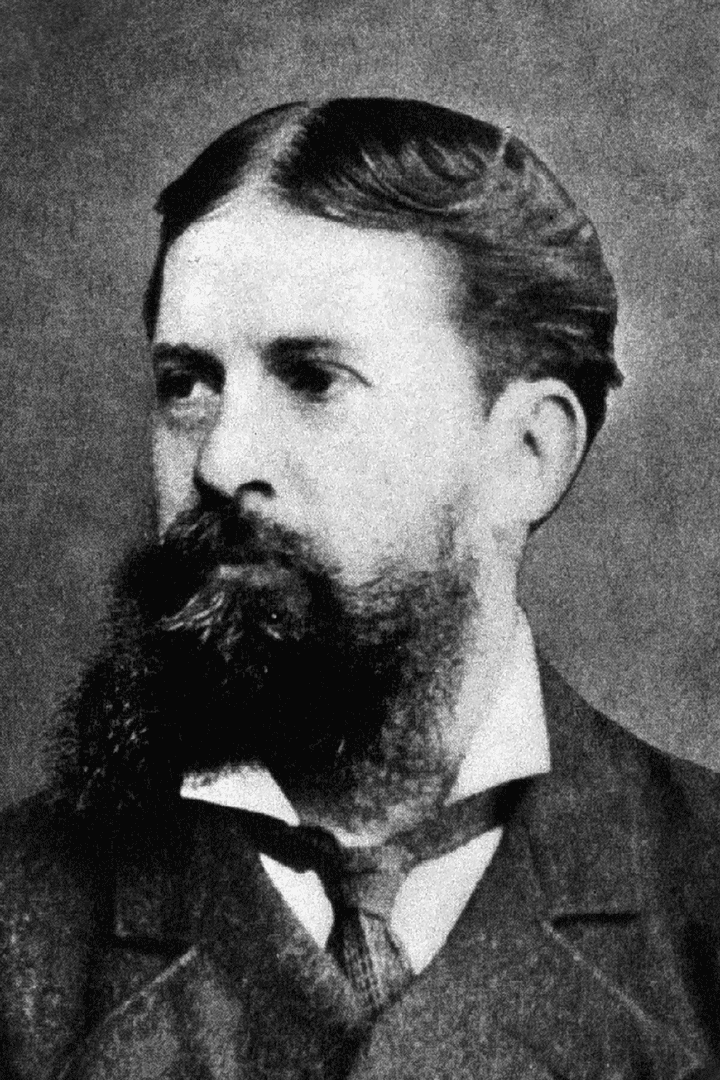
- Born: September 10, 1839; Cambridge, Massachusetts, U.S.
- Died: April 19, 1914 (aged 74); Milford, Pennsylvania, U.S.
- Father: Benjamin Peirce

Education
- Education: Harvard University
- Academic advisor: Louis Agassiz

Philosophical work
- Era: Late modern philosophy
- Region: Western philosophy
- School: Pragmatism; Pragmaticism
- Institutions: Johns Hopkins University
- Main interests: Logic; mathematics; statistics; philosophy; metrology; chemistry; experimental psychology; economics; linguistics; history of science; Philosophical logic; metaphysics; epistemology
- Notable ideas: Pragmatic maxim, abductive reasoning, triadic sign relation

Charles Sanders Peirce (/pɜːrs/ (Note: "Peirce", in the case of C. S. Peirce, always rhymes with the English-language word "terse" and so, in most dialects, is pronounced exactly like the English-language word "purse.") PURSE; September 10, 1839 – April 19, 1914) was an American scientist, mathematician, logician, and philosopher who is sometimes known as "the father of pragmatism". According to philosopher Paul Weiss, writing in 1934, Peirce was "the most original and versatile of America's philosophers and America's greatest logician". Bertrand Russell wrote in 1959, "he was one of the most original minds of the later nineteenth century and certainly the greatest American thinker ever".

Educated as a chemist and employed as a scientist for thirty years, Peirce made major contributions to logic, such as theories of relations and quantification. C. I. Lewis wrote, "The contributions of C. S. Peirce to symbolic logic are more numerous and varied than those of any other writer—at least in the nineteenth century." For Peirce, logic also encompassed much of what is now called epistemology and the philosophy of science. He saw logic as the formal branch of semiotics or study of signs, of which he is a founder, which foreshadowed the debate among logical positivists and proponents of philosophy of language that dominated 20th-century Western philosophy. Peirce's study of signs also included a tripartite theory of predication.

Additionally, he defined the concept of abductive reasoning, as well as rigorously formulating mathematical induction and deductive reasoning. He was one of the founders of statistics. As early as 1886, he saw that logical operations could be carried out by electrical switching circuits. The same idea was used decades later to produce digital computers.

In metaphysics, Peirce was an "objective idealist" in the tradition of German philosopher Immanuel Kant as well as a scholastic realist about universals. He also held a commitment to the ideas of continuity and chance as real features of the universe, views he labeled synechism and tychism respectively. Peirce believed an epistemic fallibilism and anti-skepticism went along with these views.

== Biography ==
=== Early life ===
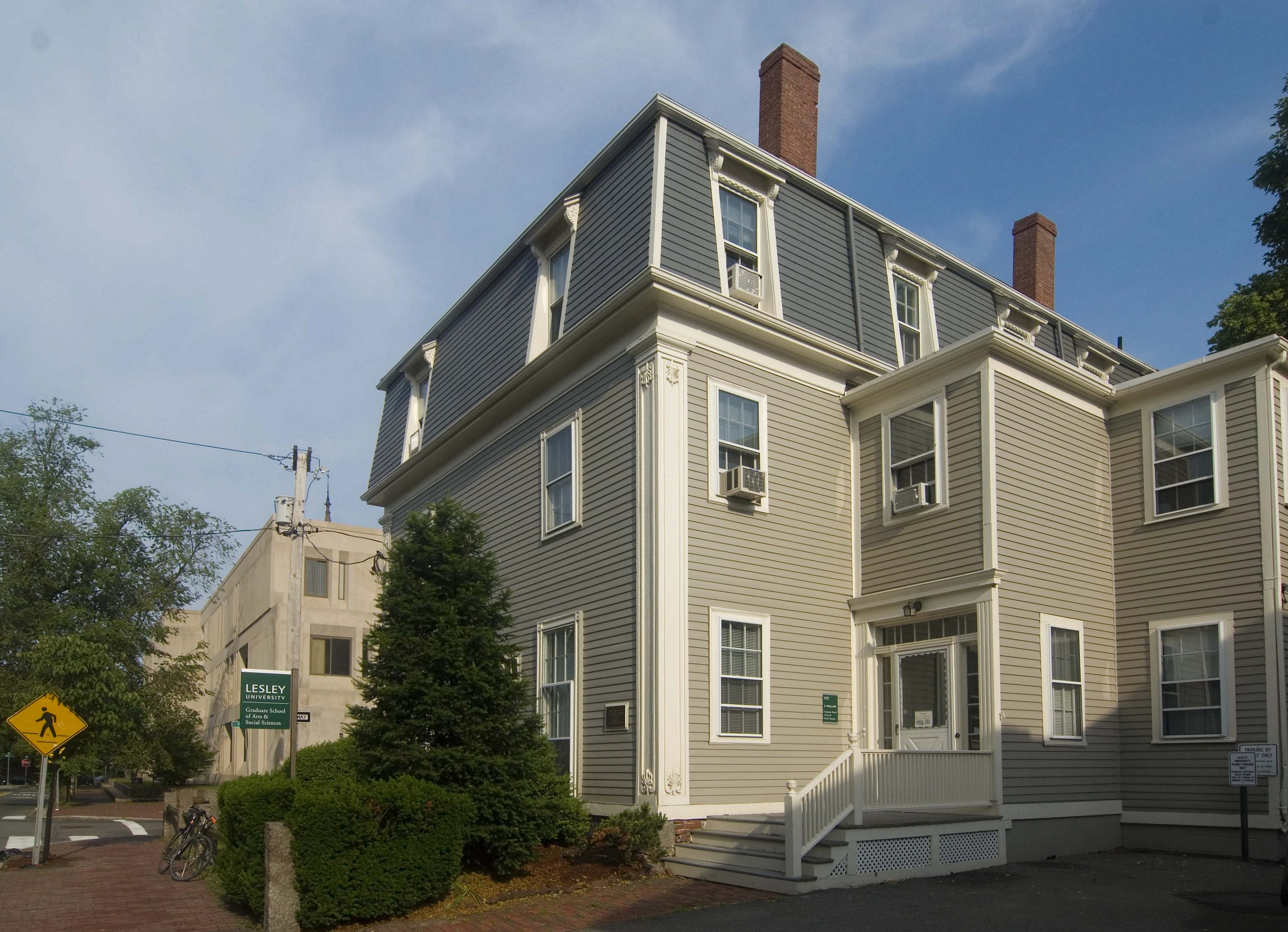
Peirce's birthplace. Now part of Lesley University's Graduate School of Arts and Social Sciences.

Peirce was born at 3 Phillips Place in Cambridge, Massachusetts. He was the son of Sarah Hunt Mills and Benjamin Peirce, himself a professor of mathematics and astronomy at Harvard University. (Note: Benjamin was one of the founders of linear algebra.) At age 12, Charles read his older brother's copy of Richard Whately's Elements of Logic, then the leading English-language text on the subject. So began his lifelong fascination with logic and reasoning.

He suffered from his late teens onward from a nervous condition then known as "facial neuralgia", which would today be diagnosed as trigeminal neuralgia. His biographer, Joseph Brent, says that when in the throes of its pain "he was, at first, almost stupefied, and then aloof, cold, depressed, extremely suspicious, impatient of the slightest crossing, and subject to violent outbursts of temper". Its consequences may have led to the social isolation of his later life.

=== Education ===
Peirce went on to earn a Bachelor of Arts degree and a Master of Arts degree (1862) from Harvard. In 1863 the Lawrence Scientific School awarded him a Bachelor of Science degree, Harvard's first summa cum laude chemistry degree. His academic record was otherwise undistinguished. At Harvard, he began lifelong friendships with Francis Ellingwood Abbot, Chauncey Wright, and William James. One of his Harvard instructors, Charles William Eliot, formed an unfavorable opinion of Peirce. This proved fateful, because Eliot, while President of Harvard (1869–1909—a period encompassing nearly all of Peirce's working life), repeatedly vetoed Peirce's employment at the university.

=== United States Coast Survey ===
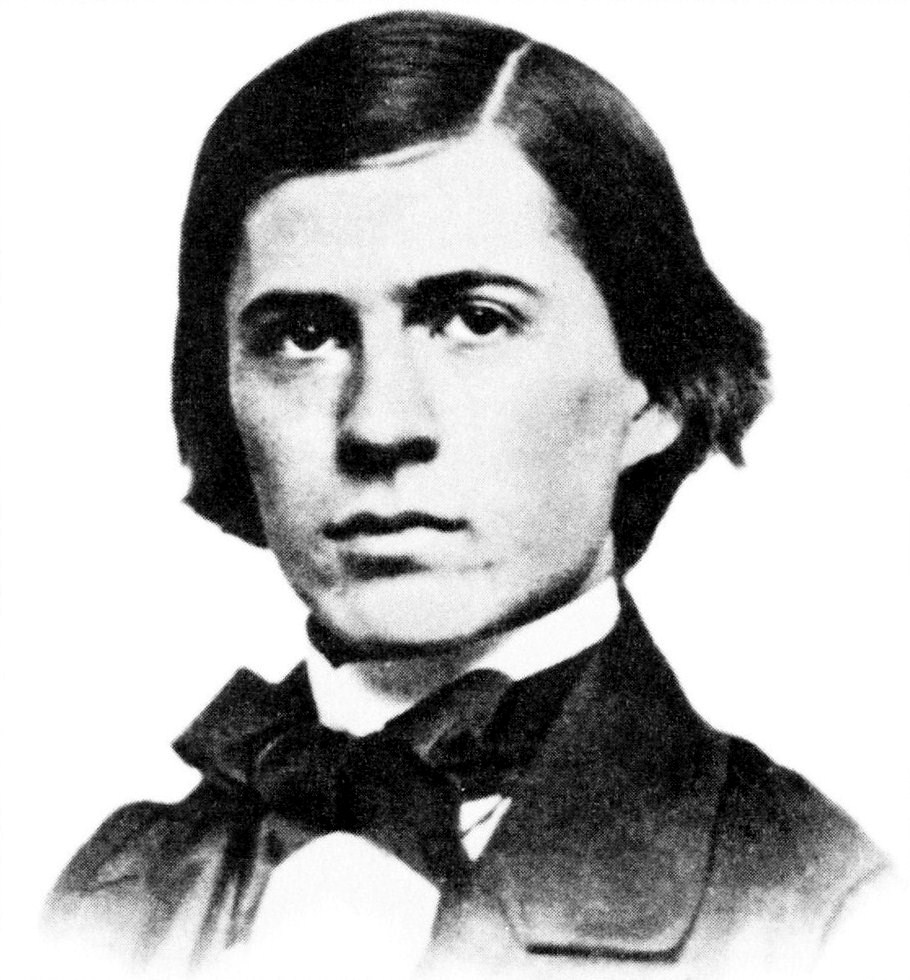
Peirce in 1859

Between 1859 and 1891, Peirce was intermittently employed in various scientific capacities by the United States Coast Survey, which in 1878 was renamed the United States Coast and Geodetic Survey, where he enjoyed his highly influential father's protection until the latter's death in 1880. At the Survey, he worked mainly in geodesy and gravimetry, refining the use of pendulums to determine small local variations in the Earth's gravity.

==== American Civil War ====
This employment exempted Peirce from having to take part in the American Civil War; it would have been very awkward for him to do so, as the Boston Brahmin Peirces sympathized with the Confederacy. No members of the Peirce family volunteered or enlisted. Peirce grew up in a home where white supremacy was taken for granted, and slavery was considered natural. Peirce's father had described himself as a secessionist until the outbreak of the war, after which he became a Union partisan, providing donations to the Sanitary Commission, the leading Northern war charity.

Peirce liked to use the following syllogism to illustrate the unreliability of traditional forms of logic (for the first premise arguably assumes the conclusion):

All Men are equal in their political rights.
Negroes are Men.
Therefore, negroes are equal in political rights to whites.

==== Travels to Europe ====
He was elected a resident fellow of the American Academy of Arts and Sciences in January 1867. The Survey sent him to Europe five times, first in 1870, returning in 1871, as part of a group sent to observe a solar eclipse that was to take place on December 22, 1870. There, he sought out Augustus De Morgan, William Stanley Jevons, and William Kingdon Clifford, British mathematicians and logicians whose turn of mind resembled his own. In 1875, Peirce conducted experiments at the Geneva Observatory with a reversible pendulum leading to the development of a pendulum of his own design in 1878. This work led in 1901 to the Earth ellipsoid proposed by Friedrich Robert Helmert, whose parameter values were close to modern values.

==== Harvard observatory ====
From 1869 to 1872, he was employed as an assistant in Harvard's astronomical observatory, doing important work on determining the brightness of stars and the shape of the Milky Way. In 1872 he founded the Metaphysical Club, a conversational philosophical club that Peirce, the future Supreme Court Justice Oliver Wendell Holmes Jr., the philosopher and psychologist William James, amongst others, formed in January 1872 in Cambridge, Massachusetts, and dissolved in December 1872. Other members of the club included Chauncey Wright, John Fiske, Francis Ellingwood Abbot, Nicholas St. John Green, and Joseph Bangs Warner. The discussions eventually birthed Peirce's notion of pragmatism.

==== National Academy of Sciences ====
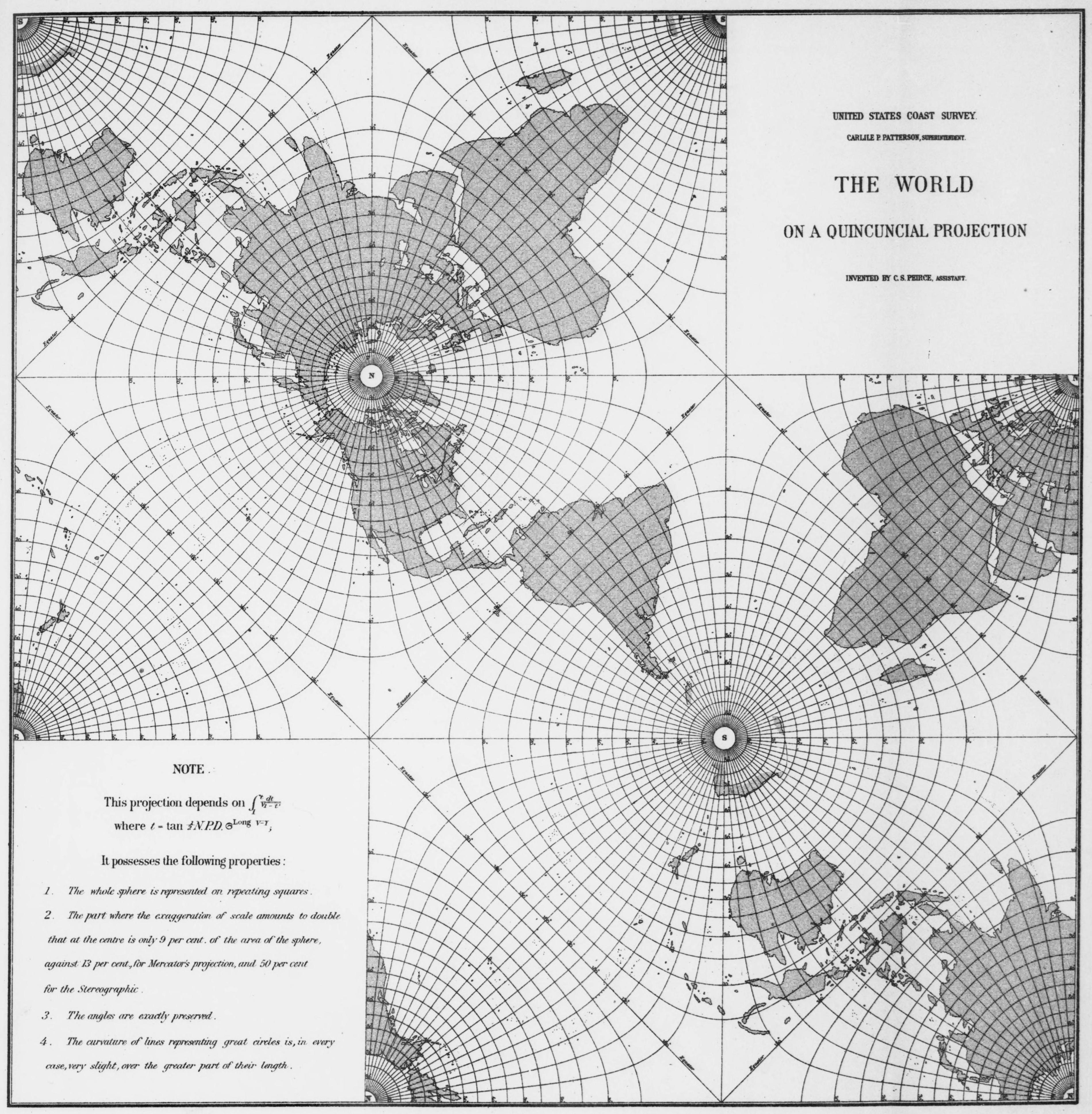
"The World on a Quincuncial Projection", 1879. Peirce's projection of a sphere onto a square keeps angles true except at four isolated points on the equator, and has less scale variation than the Mercator projection. It can be tessellated; that is, multiple copies can be joined continuously edge-to-edge.

On April 20, 1877, he was elected a member of the National Academy of Sciences. Also in 1877, he proposed measuring the meter as so many wavelengths of light of a certain frequency, the kind of definition employed from 1960 to 1983 and since 2019.

In 1879 Peirce developed Peirce quincuncial projection, having been inspired by H. A. Schwarz's 1869 conformal transformation of a circle onto a polygon of n sides (known as the Schwarz–Christoffel mapping).

==== 1880 to 1891 ====
During 1883–1909 Peirce wrote entries, ultimately thousands, on philosophy, logic, science, and other subjects for the encyclopedic Century Dictionary. In 1885, a US Senate investigation into efficiency of the United States Geological Survey and three similar government organizations led to the dismissal of Superintendent Julius Hilgard and several other Coast Survey employees for misuse of public funds. A shift in political support away from government sponsored scientific work ultimately led a request for his resignation. In 1891, Peirce resigned from the Coast Survey at Superintendent Thomas Corwin Mendenhall's request.

=== Johns Hopkins University ===
In 1879, Peirce was appointed lecturer in logic at Johns Hopkins University, which had strong departments in areas that interested him, such as philosophy (Royce and Dewey completed their PhDs at Hopkins), psychology (taught by G. Stanley Hall and studied by Joseph Jastrow, who coauthored a landmark empirical study with Peirce), and mathematics (taught by J. J. Sylvester, who came to admire Peirce's work on mathematics and logic). His Studies in Logic by Members of the Johns Hopkins University (1883) contained works by himself and Allan Marquand, Christine Ladd, Benjamin Ives Gilman, and Oscar Howard Mitchell, several of whom were his graduate students. Peirce's nontenured position at Hopkins was the only academic appointment he ever held.

Brent documents something Peirce never suspected, namely that his efforts to obtain academic employment, grants, and scientific respectability were repeatedly frustrated by the covert opposition of a major Canadian-American scientist of the day, Simon Newcomb. Newcomb had been a favourite student of Peirce's father; although "no doubt quite bright", "like Salieri in Peter Shaffer's Amadeus he also had just enough talent to recognize he was not a genius and just enough pettiness to resent someone who was". Additionally "an intensely devout and literal-minded Christian of rigid moral standards", he was appalled by what he considered Peirce's personal shortcomings. Peirce's efforts may also have been hampered by what Brent characterizes as "his difficult personality". In contrast, Keith Devlin believes that Peirce's work was too far ahead of his time to be appreciated by the academic establishment of the day and that this played a large role in his inability to obtain a tenured position.

=== Personal life ===
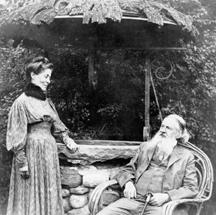
Juliette and Charles by a well at their home Arisbe in 1907

Peirce's personal life undoubtedly worked against his professional success. After his first wife, Harriet Melusina Fay ("Zina"), left him in 1875, Peirce, while still legally married, became involved with Juliette, whose last name, given variously as Froissy and Pourtalai, and nationality (she spoke French) remain uncertain. When his divorce from Zina became final in 1883, he married Juliette. That year, Newcomb pointed out to a Johns Hopkins trustee that Peirce, while a Hopkins employee, had lived and traveled with a woman to whom he was not married; the ensuing scandal led to his dismissal in January 1884. Over the years Peirce sought academic employment at various universities without success. He had no children by either marriage.

=== Later life and poverty ===
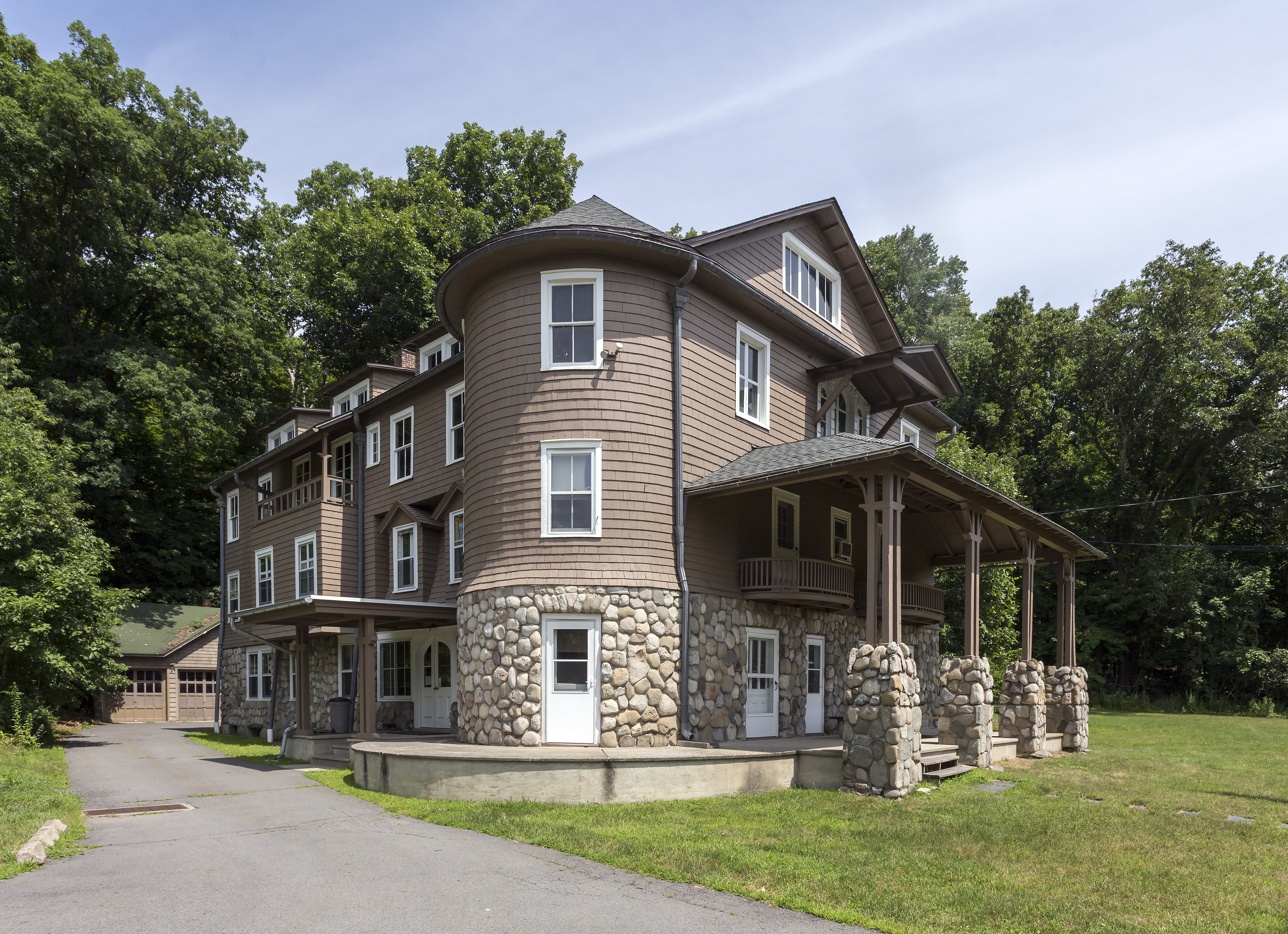
Arisbe in 2011

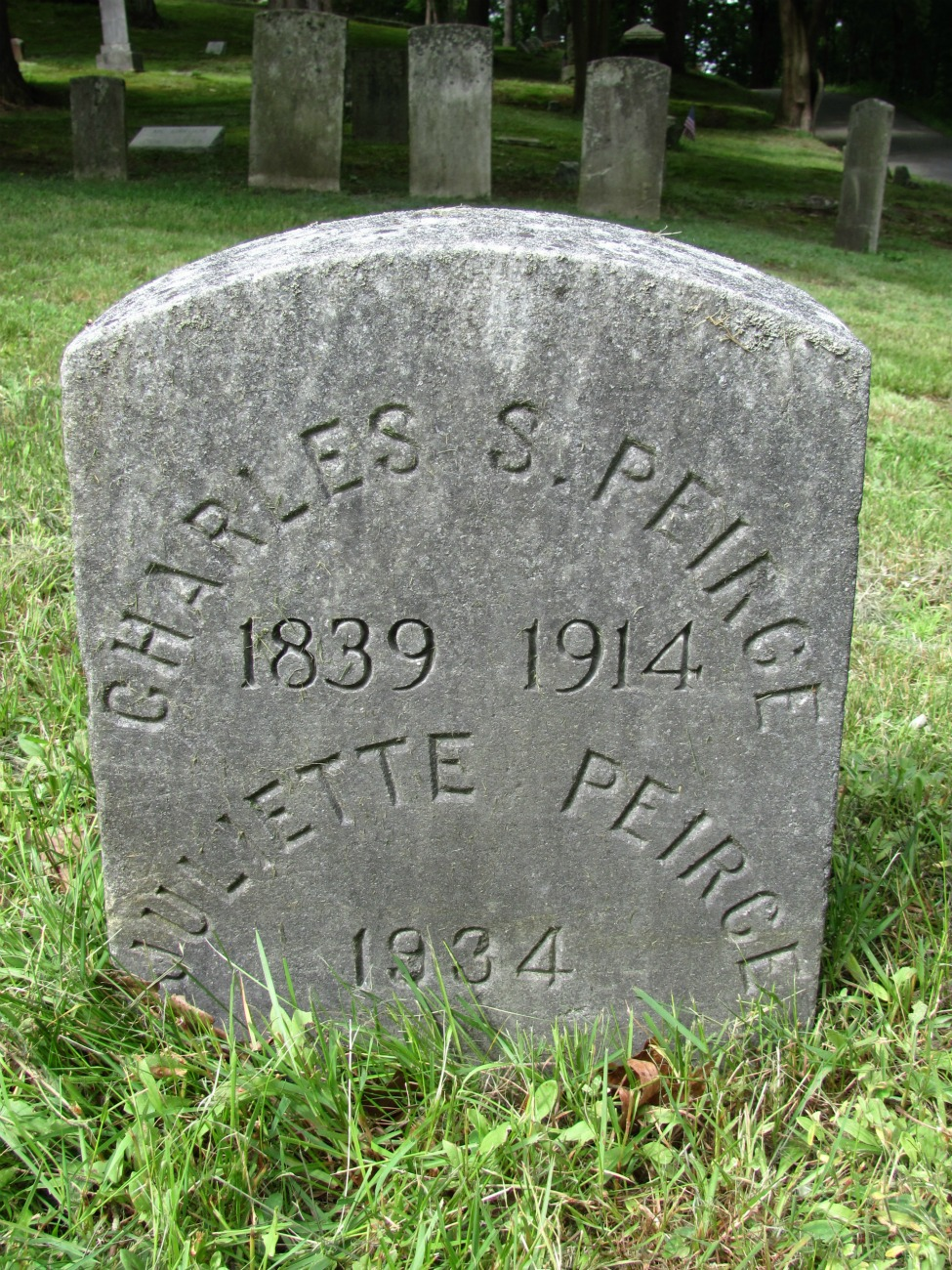
Charles and Juliette Peirce's grave

In 1887, Peirce spent part of his inheritance from his parents to buy 2,000 acres (8 km^{2}) of rural land near Milford, Pennsylvania, which never yielded an economic return. There he had an 1854 farmhouse remodeled to his design. The Peirces named the property "Arisbe". There they lived with few interruptions for the rest of their lives, Charles writing prolifically, with much of his work remaining unpublished to this day (see Works). Living beyond their means soon led to grave financial and legal difficulties. Charles spent much of his last two decades unable to afford heat in winter and subsisting on old bread donated by the local baker. Unable to afford new stationery, he wrote on the verso side of old manuscripts. An outstanding warrant for assault and unpaid debts led to his being a fugitive in New York City for a while. Several people, including his brother James Mills Peirce and his neighbors, relatives of Gifford Pinchot, settled his debts and paid his property taxes and mortgage.

Peirce did some scientific and engineering consulting and wrote much for meager pay, mainly encyclopedic dictionary entries, and reviews for The Nation (with whose editor, Wendell Phillips Garrison, he became friendly). He did translations for the Smithsonian Institution, at its director Samuel Langley's instigation. Peirce also did substantial mathematical calculations for Langley's research on powered flight. Hoping to make money, Peirce tried inventing. He began but did not complete several books. In 1888, President Grover Cleveland appointed him to the Assay Commission.

From 1890 on, he had a friend and admirer in Judge Francis C. Russell of Chicago, who introduced Peirce to editor Paul Carus and owner Edward C. Hegeler of the pioneering American philosophy journal The Monist, which eventually published at least 14 articles by Peirce. He wrote many texts in James Mark Baldwin's Dictionary of Philosophy and Psychology (1901–1905); half of those credited to him appear to have been written actually by Christine Ladd-Franklin under his supervision. He applied in 1902 to the newly formed Carnegie Institution for a grant to write a systematic book describing his life's work. The application was doomed; his nemesis, Newcomb, served on the Carnegie Institution executive committee, and its president had been president of Johns Hopkins at the time of Peirce's dismissal.

The one who did the most to help Peirce in these desperate times was his old friend William James, dedicating his Will to Believe (1897) to Peirce, and arranging for Peirce to be paid to give two series of lectures at or near Harvard (1898 and 1903). Most important, each year from 1907 until James's death in 1910, James wrote to his friends in the Boston intelligentsia to request financial aid for Peirce; the fund continued even after James died. Peirce reciprocated by designating James's eldest son as his heir should Juliette predecease him. It has been believed that this was also why Peirce used "Santiago" ("St. James" in English) as a middle name, but he appeared in print as early as 1890 as Charles Santiago Peirce. (See Charles Santiago Sanders Peirce for discussion and references).

=== Death ===
Peirce died destitute in Milford, Pennsylvania, twenty years before his widow. Juliette Peirce kept the urn with Peirce's ashes at Arisbe. In 1934, Pennsylvania Governor Gifford Pinchot arranged for Juliette's burial in Milford Cemetery. The urn with Peirce's ashes was interred with Juliette. (Note: In 2018, plans have been made to erect a memorial monument for Peirce at the site of burial – see: Justin Weinberg, 'A Proper Memorial Monument for Peirce', website Daily Nous, March 14, 2018.)

== Legacy ==
Bertrand Russell (1959) wrote "Beyond doubt [...] he was one of the most original minds of the later nineteenth century and certainly the greatest American thinker ever". Russell and Whitehead's Principia Mathematica, published from 1910 to 1913, does not mention Peirce (Peirce's work was not widely known until later). A. N. Whitehead, while reading some of Peirce's unpublished manuscripts soon after arriving at Harvard in 1924, was struck by how Peirce had anticipated his own "process" thinking. (On Peirce and process metaphysics, see Lowe 1964.) Karl Popper viewed Peirce as "one of the greatest philosophers of all times".

Yet, Peirce's achievements were not immediately recognized. Umberto Eco described Peirce as "undoubtedly the greatest unpublished writer of our generation". The Internet Encyclopedia of Philosophy says of Peirce that although "long considered an eccentric figure whose contribution to pragmatism was to provide its name and whose importance was as an influence upon James and Dewey, Peirce's significance in his own right is now largely accepted." His imposing contemporaries William James and Josiah Royce admired him and Cassius Jackson Keyser, at Columbia and C. K. Ogden, wrote about Peirce with respect but to no immediate effect.

The first scholar to give Peirce his considered professional attention was Royce's student Morris Raphael Cohen, the editor of an anthology of Peirce's writings entitled Chance, Love, and Logic (1923), and the author of the first bibliography of Peirce's scattered writings. John Dewey studied under Peirce at Johns Hopkins. From 1916 onward, Dewey's writings repeatedly mention Peirce with deference. His 1938 Logic: The Theory of Inquiry is much influenced by Peirce. The publication of the first six volumes of Collected Papers (1931–1935) was the most important event to date in Peirce studies and one that Cohen made possible by raising the needed funds; however it did not prompt an outpouring of secondary studies. The editors of those volumes, Charles Hartshorne and Paul Weiss, did not become Peirce specialists. Early landmarks of the secondary literature include the monographs by Buchler (1939), Feibleman (1946), and Goudge (1950), the 1941 PhD thesis by Arthur W. Burks (who went on to edit volumes 7 and 8), and the studies edited by Wiener and Young (1952). The Charles S. Peirce Society was founded in 1946. Its Transactions, an academic quarterly specializing in Peirce's pragmatism and American philosophy has appeared since 1965. (See Phillips 2014, 62 for discussion of Peirce and Dewey relative to transactionalism.)

By 1943 such was Peirce's reputation, in the US at least, that Webster's Biographical Dictionary said that Peirce was "now regarded as the most original thinker and greatest logician of his time".

In 1949, while doing unrelated archival work, the historian of mathematics Carolyn Eisele (1902–2000) chanced on an autograph letter by Peirce. So began her forty years of research on Peirce, “the mathematician and scientist,” culminating in several works (Eisele 1976, 1979, 1985). In 1952, the Scottish philosopher W. B. Gallie had his book Peirce and Pragmatism published, which introduced the work of Peirce to an international readership. A.J. Ayer, the English philosopher, provided the Editorial Foreword to Gallie's book. In it he credited Peirce's philosophy as being 'not only of great historical significance, as one of the original sources of American pragmatism, but also extremely important in itself.' Ayer concluded: 'it is clear from Professor Gallie's exposition of his doctrines that he is a philosopher from whom we still have much to learn.'

Beginning around 1960, Max Fisch (1900-1995), the philosopher and historian of ideas, emerged as an authority on Peirce (Fisch, 1986). He included many of his relevant articles in a survey (Fisch 1986: 422–448) of the impact of Peirce's thought through 1983.

Peirce has gained an international following, marked by university research centers devoted to Peirce studies and pragmatism in Brazil (CeneP/CIEP and Centro de Estudos de Pragmatismo), Finland (HPRC and Commens), Germany (Wirth's group, Hoffman's and Otte's group, and Deuser's and Härle's group), France (L'I.R.S.C.E.), Spain (GEP), and Italy (CSP). His writings have been translated into several languages, including German, French, Finnish, Spanish, and Swedish. Since 1950, there have been French, Italian, Spanish, British, and Brazilian Peirce scholars of note. For many years, the North American philosophy department most devoted to Peirce was the University of Toronto, thanks in part to the leadership of Thomas Goudge and David Savan. In recent years, U.S. Peirce scholars have clustered at Indiana University – Purdue University Indianapolis, home of the Peirce Edition Project (PEP) –, and Pennsylvania State University.

Currently, considerable interest is being taken in Peirce's ideas by researchers wholly outside the arena of academic philosophy. The interest comes from industry, business, technology, intelligence organizations, and the military; and it has resulted in the existence of a substantial number of agencies, institutes, businesses, and laboratories in which ongoing research into and development of Peircean concepts are being vigorously undertaken.

— Robert Burch, 2001, updated 2010

In recent years, Peirce's trichotomy of signs is exploited by a growing number of practitioners for marketing and design tasks.

John Deely writes that Peirce was the last of the "moderns" and "first of the postmoderns". He lauds Peirce's doctrine of signs as a contribution to the dawn of the Postmodern epoch. Deely additionally comments that "Peirce stands...in a position analogous to the position occupied by Augustine as last of the Western Fathers and first of the medievals".

== Works ==
Peirce's reputation rests largely on academic papers published in American scientific and scholarly journals such as Proceedings of the American Academy of Arts and Sciences, the Journal of Speculative Philosophy, The Monist, Popular Science Monthly, the American Journal of Mathematics, Memoirs of the National Academy of Sciences, The Nation, and others. See Articles by Peirce, published in his lifetime for an extensive list with links to them online. The only full-length book (neither extract nor pamphlet) that Peirce authored and saw published in his lifetime was Photometric Researches (1878), a 181-page monograph on a photometric approach, measuring stellar brightness, to a more precise determination of the shape of the Milky Way. While at Johns Hopkins, he edited Studies in Logic (1883), containing chapters by himself and his graduate students. Besides lectures during his years (1879–1884) as lecturer in Logic at Johns Hopkins, he gave at least nine series of lectures, many now published; see Lectures by Peirce.

After Peirce's death, Harvard University obtained from Peirce's widow the papers found in his study, but did not microfilm them until 1964. Only after Richard Robin (1967) catalogued this Nachlass did it become clear that Peirce had left approximately 1,650 unpublished manuscripts, totaling over 100,000 pages, mostly still unpublished except on microfilm. On the vicissitudes of Peirce's papers, see Houser (1989). Reportedly the papers remain in unsatisfactory condition.

The first published anthology of Peirce's articles was the one-volume Chance, Love and Logic: Philosophical Essays, edited by Morris Raphael Cohen, 1923, still in print. Other one-volume anthologies were published in 1940, 1957, 1958, 1972, 1994, and 2009, most still in print. The main posthumous editions of Peirce's works in their long trek to light, often multi-volume, and some still in print, have included:

1931–1958: Collected Papers of Charles Sanders Peirce (CP), 8 volumes, includes many published works, along with a selection of previously unpublished work and a smattering of his correspondence. This long-time standard edition drawn from Peirce's work from the 1860s to 1913 remains the most comprehensive survey of his prolific output from 1893 to 1913. It is organized thematically, but texts (including lecture series) are often split up across volumes, while texts from various stages in Peirce's development are often combined, requiring frequent visits to editors' notes. Edited (1–6) by Charles Hartshorne and Paul Weiss and (7–8) by Arthur Burks, in print and online.

1975–1987: Charles Sanders Peirce: Contributions to The Nation, 4 volumes, includes Peirce's more than 300 reviews and articles published 1869–1908 in The Nation. Edited by Kenneth Laine Ketner and James Edward Cook, online.

1976: The New Elements of Mathematics by Charles S. Peirce, 4 volumes in 5, included many previously unpublished Peirce manuscripts on mathematical subjects, along with Peirce's important published mathematical articles. Edited by Carolyn Eisele, back in print.

1977: Semiotic and Significs: The Correspondence between C. S. Peirce and Victoria Lady Welby (2nd edition 2001), included Peirce's entire correspondence (1903–1912) with Victoria, Lady Welby. Peirce's other published correspondence is largely limited to the 14 letters included in volume 8 of the Collected Papers, and the 20-odd pre-1890 items included so far in the Writings. Edited by Charles S. Hardwick with James Cook, out of print.

1982–present: Writings of Charles S. Peirce, A Chronological Edition (W), Volumes 1–6 & 8, of a projected 30. The limited coverage, and defective editing and organization, of the Collected Papers led Max Fisch and others in the 1970s to found the Peirce Edition Project (PEP), whose mission is to prepare a more complete critical chronological edition. Only seven volumes have appeared to date, but they cover the period from 1859 to 1892, when Peirce carried out much of his best-known work. Writings of Charles S. Peirce, 8 was published in November 2010; and work continues on Writings of Charles S. Peirce, 7, 9, and 11. In print and online.

1985: Historical Perspectives on Peirce's Logic of Science: A History of Science, 2 volumes. Auspitz has said, "The extent of Peirce's immersion in the science of his day is evident in his reviews in the Nation [...] and in his papers, grant applications, and publishers' prospectuses in the history and practice of science", referring latterly to Historical Perspectives. Edited by Carolyn Eisele, back in print.

1992: Reasoning and the Logic of Things collects in one place Peirce's 1898 series of lectures invited by William James. Edited by Kenneth Laine Ketner, with commentary by Hilary Putnam, in print.

1992–1998: The Essential Peirce (EP), 2 volumes, is an important recent sampler of Peirce's philosophical writings. Edited (1) by Nathan Hauser and Christian Kloesel and (2) by Peirce Edition Project editors, in print.

1997: Pragmatism as a Principle and Method of Right Thinking collects Peirce's 1903 Harvard "Lectures on Pragmatism" in a study edition, including drafts, of Peirce's lecture manuscripts, which had been previously published in abridged form; the lectures now also appear in The Essential Peirce, 2. Edited by Patricia Ann Turisi, in print.

2010: Philosophy of Mathematics: Selected Writings collects important writings by Peirce on the subject, many not previously in print. Edited by Matthew E. Moore, in print.

== Mathematics ==
Peirce's most important work in pure mathematics was in logical and foundational areas. He also worked on linear algebra, matrices, various geometries, topology and Listing numbers, Bell numbers, graphs, the four-color problem, and the nature of continuity.

He worked on applied mathematics in economics, engineering, and map projections, and was especially active in probability and statistics.

Discoveries

↓
The Peirce arrow,
symbol for "(neither) ... nor ...", also called the Quine dagger

Peirce made a number of striking discoveries in formal logic and foundational mathematics, nearly all of which came to be appreciated only long after he died:

In 1860, he suggested a cardinal arithmetic for infinite numbers, years before any work by Georg Cantor (who completed his dissertation in 1867) and without access to Bernard Bolzano's 1851 (posthumous) Paradoxien des Unendlichen.

In 1880–1881, he showed how Boolean algebra could be done via a repeated sufficient single binary operation (logical NOR), anticipating Henry M. Sheffer by 33 years. (See also De Morgan's Laws.)

In 1881, he set out the axiomatization of natural number arithmetic, a few years before Richard Dedekind and Giuseppe Peano. In the same paper Peirce gave, years before Dedekind, the first purely cardinal definition of a finite set in the sense now known as "Dedekind-finite", and implied by the same stroke an important formal definition of an infinite set (Dedekind-infinite), as a set that can be put into a one-to-one correspondence with one of its proper subsets.

In 1885, he distinguished between first-order and second-order quantification. (Note: It was in Peirce's 1885 "On the Algebra of Logic". See Byrnes, John (1998), "Peirce's First-Order Logic of 1885", Transactions of the Charles S. Peirce Society v. 34, n. 4, pp. 949–976.) In the same paper he set out what can be read as the first (primitive) axiomatic set theory, anticipating Zermelo by about two decades (Brady 2000, pp. 132–133).

Existential graphs: Alpha graphs

In 1886, he saw that Boolean calculations could be carried out via electrical switches, anticipating Claude Shannon by more than 50 years. By the later 1890s he was devising existential graphs, a diagrammatic notation for the predicate calculus. Based on them are John F. Sowa's conceptual graphs and Sun-Joo Shin's diagrammatic reasoning.

The New Elements of Mathematics

Peirce wrote drafts for an introductory textbook, with the working title The New Elements of Mathematics, that presented mathematics from an original standpoint. Those drafts and many other of his previously unpublished mathematical manuscripts finally appeared in The New Elements of Mathematics by Charles S. Peirce (1976), edited by mathematician Carolyn Eisele.

Nature of mathematics

Peirce agreed with Auguste Comte in regarding mathematics as more basic than philosophy and the special sciences (of nature and mind). Peirce classified mathematics into three subareas: (1) mathematics of logic, (2) discrete series, and (3) pseudo-continua (as he called them, including the real numbers) and continua. Influenced by his father Benjamin, Peirce argued that mathematics studies purely hypothetical objects and is not just the science of quantity but is more broadly the science which draws necessary conclusions; that mathematics aids logic, not vice versa; and that logic itself is part of philosophy and is the science about drawing conclusions necessary and otherwise.

=== Mathematics of logic ===
Mathematical logic and foundations, some noted articles
- "On an Improvement in Boole's Calculus of Logic" (1867)
- "Description of a Notation for the Logic of Relatives" (1870)
- "On the Algebra of Logic" (1880)
- "A Boolian [sic] Algebra with One Constant" (1880 MS)
- "On the Logic of Number" (1881)
- "Note B: The Logic of Relatives" (1883)
- "On the Algebra of Logic: A Contribution to the Philosophy of Notation" (1884/1885)
- "The Logic of Relatives" (1897)
- "The Simplest Mathematics" (1902 MS)
- "Prolegomena to an Apology for Pragmaticism" (1906, on existential graphs)

=== Probability and statistics ===
Peirce held that science achieves statistical probabilities, not certainties, and that spontaneity ("absolute chance") is real (see Tychism on his view). Most of his statistical writings promote the frequency interpretation of probability (objective ratios of cases), and many of his writings express skepticism about (and criticize the use of) probability when such models are not based on objective randomization. (Note: Peirce condemned the use of "certain likelihoods" (The Essential Peirce, 2:108–109) even more strongly than he criticized Bayesian methods. Peirce used Bayesian inference in criticizing parapsychology (Writings of Charles S. Peirce, 6:76).) Though Peirce was largely a frequentist, his possible world semantics introduced the "propensity" theory of probability before Karl Popper. Peirce (sometimes with Joseph Jastrow) investigated the probability judgments of experimental subjects, "perhaps the very first" elicitation and estimation of subjective probabilities in experimental psychology and (what came to be called) Bayesian statistics.

Peirce formulated modern statistics in "Illustrations of the Logic of Science" (1877–1878) and "A Theory of Probable Inference" (1883). With a repeated measures design, Charles Sanders Peirce and Joseph Jastrow introduced blinded, controlled randomized experiments in 1884 (Hacking 1990:205) (before Ronald A. Fisher). He invented optimal design for experiments on gravity, in which he "corrected the means". He used correlation and smoothing. Peirce extended the work on outliers by Benjamin Peirce, his father. He introduced the terms "confidence" and "likelihood" (before Jerzy Neyman and Fisher). (See Stephen Stigler's historical books and Ian Hacking 1990.)

=== Philosophy of mathematics ===
Peirce saw mathematics as the science that analyses the substance of fundamental hypotheses (which are defined by Peirce as propositions that are true of potential objects) drawn from the mind, drawing from criticisms of his father's earlier notion of the subject as "the science which draws necessary conclusions" via arguing that, since the "necessary" conclusions in this instance are unable to be drawn from unless we use perfect knowledge, that this definition must be changed to that of hypotheses. The substances of mathematical hypotheses are never truly experienced, but it is taught that any type of interaction with them must be strictly cognitive. To him, what makes mathematics special as a science compared to, say, philosophy or physics is that the two examine what can be perceived to an extent (even philosophy deals with universal truths/aspects of perception or knowledge, for example), but mathematical concepts/statements are completely abstract and self-evident; as such, mathematicians are the most foreign amongst scientists regarding abstraction. Expanding on his view that mathematics revolves around these hypotheses, he later takes that all branches of mathematics must take a single "general hypothesis" which is supposed to comprehensively describe all objects in that branch in a simple and abstract manner, akin to our modern types of foundations of mathematics. It is seen that a mathematical abstraction is "a substance whose being consists in the truth of some proposition concerning a more primary substance". Still, Peirce takes the view of abstractions being more of a mental state, with some abstractions (such as aggregates of objects; sets) being more "real" compared to others (such as algebraic manipulations).

As most of his works related to the philosophy of mathematics were written during the foundational crisis of mathematics, he often goes on digressions about the essence of mathematical reasoning and justification. For example, mathematical logic was perceived by him to be "in-between" arithmetic and geometry regarding empirical basis; geometry is regarded as a branch of mathematics which is heavily intertwined with the physical world, whereas arithmetic is considered to be about a priori statements, and logic is (or was) a middle ground. Even the notion of mathematical proof as inherently self-evident (akin to syllogisms) is cast into doubt by giving the example of a chemist who mixes together several compounds, creating a reaction which results in the formation of an entirely new compound. In this case, the parts of the reaction or new compounds formed by this mixing are not expected by the chemist, and are not in any way "contained" nor inherently predicted by the content of the initial compounds. Because of this perceived inadequacy with reducing all mathematical reasoning to syllogisms, he pivots to seeing proof in terms of the observation and relational manipulation of diagrams. These diagrams may vary by mathematical sub-field; in geometry, for example, these diagrams directly refer to visual manipulations of objects, whereas in algebra, the relationships and rules are merely ascribed to different parts of the diagrams.

He defines continuity (in the mathematical sense and in other ways) in terms of Aristotle's notion of a continuous function or segment, which is "something whose parts have a common limit".

== As a philosopher ==
Peirce was a working scientist for 30 years, and arguably was a professional philosopher only during the five years he lectured at Johns Hopkins. He learned philosophy mainly by reading, each day, a few pages of Immanuel Kant's Critique of Pure Reason, in the original German, while a Harvard undergraduate. His writings bear on a wide array of disciplines, including mathematics, logic, philosophy, statistics, astronomy, metrology, geodesy, experimental psychology, economics, linguistics, and the history and philosophy of science. This work has enjoyed renewed interest and approval, a revival inspired not only by his anticipations of recent scientific developments but also by his demonstration of how philosophy can be applied effectively to human problems.

Peirce's philosophy includes a pervasive three-category system: belief that truth is immutable and is both independent from actual opinion (fallibilism) and discoverable (no radical skepticism), logic as formal semiotic on signs, on arguments, and on inquiry's ways—including philosophical pragmatism (which he founded), critical common-sensism, and scientific method—and, in metaphysics: Scholastic realism, e.g. John Duns Scotus, belief in God, freedom, and at least an attenuated immortality, objective idealism, and belief in the reality of continuity and of absolute chance, mechanical necessity, and creative love. In his work, fallibilism and pragmatism may seem to work somewhat like skepticism and positivism, respectively, in others' work. However, for Peirce, fallibilism is balanced by an anti-skepticism and is a basis for belief in the reality of absolute chance and of continuity, and pragmatism commits one to anti-nominalist belief in the reality of the general (CP 5.453–457).

For Peirce, First Philosophy, which he also called cenoscopy, is less basic than mathematics and more basic than the special sciences (of nature and mind). It studies positive phenomena in general, phenomena available to any person at any waking moment, and does not settle questions by resorting to special experiences. He divided such philosophy into (1) phenomenology (which he also called phaneroscopy or categorics), (2) normative sciences (esthetics, ethics, and logic), and (3) metaphysics; his views on them are discussed in order below.

Peirce did not write extensively in aesthetics and ethics, but came by 1902 to hold that aesthetics, ethics, and logic, in that order, comprise the normative sciences. He characterized aesthetics as the study of the good (grasped as the admirable), and thus of the ends governing all conduct and thought.

== Pragmatism ==
Some noted articles and lectures
- Illustrations of the Logic of Science (1877–1878):
  inquiry, pragmatism, statistics, inference
1. The Fixation of Belief (1877)
2. How to Make Our Ideas Clear (1878)
3. The Doctrine of Chances (1878)
4. The Probability of Induction (1878)
5. The Order of Nature (1878)
6. Deduction, Induction, and Hypothesis (1878)
- The Harvard lectures on pragmatism (1903)
- What Pragmatism Is (1905)
- Issues of Pragmaticism (1905)
- Pragmatism (1907 MS in The Essential Peirce, 2)

Peirce's recipe for pragmatic thinking, which he called pragmatism and, later, pragmaticism, is recapitulated in several versions of the so-called pragmatic maxim. Here is one of his more emphatic reiterations of it:

Consider what effects that might conceivably have practical bearings you conceive the objects of your conception to have. Then, your conception of those effects is the whole of your conception of the object.

As a movement, pragmatism began in the early 1870s in discussions among Peirce, William James, and others in the Metaphysical Club. James among others regarded some articles by Peirce such as "The Fixation of Belief" (1877) and especially "How to Make Our Ideas Clear" (1878) as foundational to pragmatism. Peirce (CP 5.11–12), like James (Pragmatism: A New Name for Some Old Ways of Thinking, 1907), saw pragmatism as embodying familiar attitudes, in philosophy and elsewhere, elaborated into a new deliberate method for fruitful thinking about problems. Peirce differed from James and the early John Dewey, in some of their tangential enthusiasms, in being decidedly more rationalistic and realistic, in several senses of those terms, throughout the preponderance of his own philosophical moods.

In 1905 Peirce coined the new name pragmaticism "for the precise purpose of expressing the original definition", saying that "all went happily" with James's and F.C.S. Schiller's variant uses of the old name "pragmatism" and that he coined the new name because of the old name's growing use in "literary journals, where it gets abused". Yet he cited as causes, in a 1906 manuscript, his differences with James and Schiller and, in a 1908 publication, his differences with James as well as literary author Giovanni Papini's declaration of pragmatism's indefinability. Peirce in any case regarded his views that truth is immutable and infinity is real, as being opposed by the other pragmatists, but he remained allied with them on other issues.

Pragmatism begins with the idea that belief is that on which one is prepared to act. Peirce's pragmatism is a method of clarification of conceptions of objects. It equates any conception of an object to a conception of that object's effects to a general extent of the effects' conceivable implications for informed practice. It is a method of sorting out conceptual confusions occasioned, for example, by distinctions that make (sometimes needed) formal yet not practical differences. He formulated both pragmatism and statistical principles as aspects of scientific logic, in his "Illustrations of the Logic of Science" series of articles. In the second one, "How to Make Our Ideas Clear", Peirce discussed three grades of clearness of conception:

1. Clearness of a conception familiar and readily used, even if unanalyzed and undeveloped.
2. Clearness of a conception in virtue of clearness of its parts, in virtue of which logicians called an idea "distinct", that is, clarified by analysis of just what makes it applicable. Elsewhere, echoing Kant, Peirce called a likewise distinct definition "nominal" (CP 5.553).
3. Clearness in virtue of clearness of conceivable practical implications of the object's conceived effects, such that fosters fruitful reasoning, especially on difficult problems. Here he introduced that which he later called the pragmatic maxim.

By way of example of how to clarify conceptions, he addressed conceptions about truth and the real as questions of the presuppositions of reasoning in general. In clearness's second grade (the "nominal" grade), he defined truth as a sign's correspondence to its object, and the real as the object of such correspondence, such that truth and the real are independent of that which you or I or any actual, definite community of inquirers think. After that needful but confined step, next in clearness's third grade (the pragmatic, practice-oriented grade) he defined truth as that opinion which would be reached, sooner or later but still inevitably, by research taken far enough, such that the real does depend on that ideal final opinion—a dependence to which he appeals in theoretical arguments elsewhere, for instance for the long-run validity of the rule of induction. Peirce argued that even to argue against the independence and discoverability of truth and the real is to presuppose that there is, about that very question under argument, a truth with just such independence and discoverability.

Peirce said that a conception's meaning consists in "all general modes of rational conduct" implied by "acceptance" of the conception—that is, if one were to accept, first of all, the conception as true, then what could one conceive to be consequent general modes of rational conduct by all who accept the conception as true?—the whole of such consequent general modes is the whole meaning. His pragmatism does not equate a conception's meaning, its intellectual purport, with the conceived benefit or cost of the conception itself, like a meme (or, say, propaganda), outside the perspective of its being true, nor, since a conception is general, is its meaning equated with any definite set of actual consequences or upshots corroborating or undermining the conception or its worth. His pragmatism also bears no resemblance to "vulgar" pragmatism, which misleadingly connotes a ruthless and Machiavellian search for mercenary or political advantage. Instead the pragmatic maxim is the heart of his pragmatism as a method of experimentational mental reflection arriving at conceptions in terms of conceivable confirmatory and disconfirmatory circumstances—a method hospitable to the formation of explanatory hypotheses, and conducive to the use and improvement of verification.

Peirce's pragmatism, as method and theory of definitions and conceptual clearness, is part of his theory of inquiry, which he variously called speculative, general, formal or universal rhetoric or simply methodeutic. He applied his pragmatism as a method throughout his work.

=== Theory of inquiry ===
In "The Fixation of Belief" (1877), Peirce gives his take on the psychological origin and aim of inquiry. On his view, individuals are motivated to inquiry by desire to escape the feelings of anxiety and unease which Peirce takes to be characteristic of the state of doubt. Doubt is described by Peirce as an "uneasy and dissatisfied state from which we struggle to free ourselves and pass into the state of belief." Peirce uses words like "irritation" to describe the experience of being in doubt and to explain why he thinks we find such experiences to be motivating. The irritating feeling of doubt is appeased, Peirce says, through our efforts to achieve a settled state of satisfaction with what we land on as our answer to the question which led to that doubt in the first place. This settled state, namely, belief, is described by Peirce as "a calm and satisfactory state which we do not wish to avoid." Our efforts to achieve the satisfaction of belief, by whichever methods we may pursue, are what Peirce calls "inquiry". Four methods which Peirce describes as having been actually pursued throughout the history of thought are summarized below in the section after next.

==== Critical common-sensism ====
Critical common-sensism, treated by Peirce as a consequence of his pragmatism, is his combination of Thomas Reid's common-sense philosophy with a fallibilism that recognizes that propositions of our more or less vague common sense now indubitable may later come into question, for example because of transformations of our world through science. It includes efforts to raise genuine doubts in tests for a core group of common indubitables that change slowly, if at all.

==== Rival methods of inquiry ====
In "The Fixation of Belief" (1877), Peirce described inquiry in general not as the pursuit of truth per se but as the struggle to move from irritating, inhibitory doubt born of surprise, disagreement, and the like, and to reach a secure belief, belief being that on which one is prepared to act. That let Peirce frame scientific inquiry as part of a broader spectrum and as spurred, like inquiry generally, by actual doubt, not mere verbal, quarrelsome, or hyperbolic doubt, which he held to be fruitless. Peirce sketched four methods of settling opinion, ordered from least to most successful:

1. The method of tenacity (policy of sticking to initial belief) – which brings comforts and decisiveness but leads to trying to ignore contrary information and others' views as if truth were intrinsically private, not public. The method goes against the social impulse and easily falters since one may well notice when another's opinion seems as good as one's own initial opinion. Its successes can be brilliant but tend to be transitory.
2. The method of authority – which overcomes disagreements but sometimes brutally. Its successes can be majestic and long-lasting, but it cannot regulate people thoroughly enough to withstand doubts indefinitely, especially when people learn about other societies present and past.
3. The method of the a priori – which promotes conformity less brutally but fosters opinions as something like tastes, arising in conversation and comparisons of perspectives in terms of "what is agreeable to reason". Thereby it depends on fashion in paradigms and goes in circles over time. It is more intellectual and respectable but, like the first two methods, sustains accidental and capricious beliefs, destining some minds to doubt it.
4. The method of science – wherein inquiry supposes that the real is discoverable but independent of particular opinion, such that, unlike in the other methods, inquiry can, by its own account, go wrong (fallibilism), not only right, and thus purposely tests itself and criticizes, corrects, and improves itself.

Peirce held that, in practical affairs, slow and stumbling ratiocination is often dangerously inferior to instinct and traditional sentiment, and that the scientific method is best suited to theoretical research, which in turn should not be trammeled by the other methods and practical ends; reason's "first rule" is that, in order to learn, one must desire to learn and, as a corollary, must not block the way of inquiry. Scientific method excels over the others finally by being deliberately designed to arrive—eventually—at the most secure beliefs, upon which the most successful practices can be based. Starting from the idea that people seek not truth per se but instead to subdue irritating, inhibitory doubt, Peirce showed how, through the struggle, some can come to submit to truth for the sake of belief's integrity, seek as truth the guidance of potential conduct correctly to its given goal, and wed themselves to the scientific method.

==== Scientific method ====
Insofar as clarification by pragmatic reflection suits explanatory hypotheses and fosters predictions and testing, pragmatism points beyond the usual duo of foundational alternatives: deduction from self-evident truths, or rationalism; and induction from experiential phenomena, or empiricism.

Based on his critique of three modes of argument and different from either foundationalism or coherentism, Peirce's approach seeks to justify claims by a three-phase dynamic of inquiry:

1. Active, abductive genesis of theory, with no prior assurance of truth;
2. Deductive application of the contingent theory so as to clarify its practical implications;
3. Inductive testing and evaluation of the utility of the provisional theory in anticipation of future experience, in both senses: prediction and control.

Thereby, Peirce devised an approach to inquiry far more solid than the flatter image of inductive generalization simpliciter, which is a mere re-labeling of phenomenological patterns. Peirce's pragmatism was the first time the scientific method was proposed as an epistemology for philosophical questions.

A theory that succeeds better than its rivals in predicting and controlling our world is said to be nearer the truth. This is an operational notion of truth used by scientists.

Peirce extracted the pragmatic model or theory of inquiry from its raw materials in classical logic and refined it in parallel with the early development of symbolic logic to address problems about the nature of scientific reasoning.

Abduction, deduction, and induction make incomplete sense in isolation from one another but comprise a cycle understandable as a whole insofar as they collaborate toward the common end of inquiry. In the pragmatic way of thinking about conceivable practical implications, every thing has a purpose, and, as possible, its purpose should first be denoted. Abduction hypothesizes an explanation for deduction to clarify into implications to be tested so that induction can evaluate the hypothesis, in the struggle to move from troublesome uncertainty to more secure belief. No matter how traditional and needful it is to study the modes of inference in abstraction from one another, the integrity of inquiry strongly limits the effective modularity of its principal components.

Peirce's outline of the scientific method in §III–IV of "A Neglected Argument" is summarized below (except as otherwise noted). There he also reviewed plausibility and inductive precision (issues of critique of arguments).

1. Abductive (or retroductive) phase. Guessing, inference to explanatory hypotheses for selection of those best worth trying. From abduction, Peirce distinguishes induction as inferring, on the basis of tests, the proportion of truth in the hypothesis. Every inquiry, whether into ideas, brute facts, or norms and laws, arises from surprising observations in one or more of those realms (and for example at any stage of an inquiry already underway). All explanatory content of theories comes from abduction, which guesses a new or outside idea so as to account in a simple, economical way for a surprising or complicated phenomenon. The modicum of success in our guesses far exceeds that of random luck, and seems born of attunement to nature by developed or inherent instincts, especially insofar as best guesses are optimally plausible and simple in the sense of the "facile and natural", as by Galileo's natural light of reason and as distinct from "logical simplicity". Abduction is the most fertile but least secure mode of inference. Its general rationale is inductive: it succeeds often enough and it has no substitute in expediting us toward new truths. In 1903, Peirce called pragmatism "the logic of abduction". Coordinative method leads from abducting a plausible hypothesis to judging it for its testability and for how its trial would economize inquiry itself. The hypothesis, being insecure, needs to have practical implications leading at least to mental tests and, in science, lending themselves to scientific tests. A simple but unlikely guess, if not costly to test for falsity, may belong first in line for testing. A guess is intrinsically worth testing if it has plausibility or reasoned objective probability, while subjective likelihood, though reasoned, can be misleadingly seductive. Guesses can be selected for trial strategically, for their caution (for which Peirce gave as example the game of Twenty Questions), breadth, or incomplexity. One can discover only that which would be revealed through their sufficient experience anyway, and so the point is to expedite it; economy of research demands the leap, so to speak, of abduction and governs its art.
1. Deductive phase. Two stages:

i. Explication. Not clearly premised, but a deductive analysis of the hypothesis so as to render its parts as clear as possible.
ii. Demonstration: Deductive Argumentation, Euclidean in procedure. Explicit deduction of consequences of the hypothesis as predictions about evidence to be found. Corollarial or, if needed, Theorematic.

1. Inductive phase. Evaluation of the hypothesis, inferring from observational or experimental tests of its deduced consequences. The long-run validity of the rule of induction is deducible from the principle (presuppositional to reasoning in general) that the real "is only the object of the final opinion to which sufficient investigation would lead"; in other words, anything excluding such a process would never be real. Induction involving the ongoing accumulation of evidence follows "a method which, sufficiently persisted in", will "diminish the error below any predesignate degree". Three stages:

i. Classification. Not clearly premised, but an inductive classing of objects of experience under general ideas.
ii. Probation: direct Inductive Argumentation. Crude or Gradual in procedure. Crude Induction, founded on experience in one mass (CP 2.759), presumes that future experience on a question will not differ utterly from all past experience (CP 2.756). Gradual Induction makes a new estimate of the proportion of truth in the hypothesis after each test, and is Qualitative or Quantitative. Qualitative Gradual Induction depends on estimating the relative evident weights of the various qualities of the subject class under investigation (CP 2.759; see also Collected Papers of Charles Sanders Peirce, 7.114–120). Quantitative Gradual Induction depends on how often, in a fair sample of instances of S, S is found actually accompanied by P that was predicted for S (CP 2.758). It depends on measurements, or statistics, or counting.
iii. Sentential Induction. "...which, by Inductive reasonings, appraises the different Probations singly, then their combinations, then makes self-appraisal of these very appraisals themselves, and passes final judgment on the whole result".

==== Against Cartesianism ====
Peirce drew on the methodological implications of the four incapacities—no genuine introspection, no intuition in the sense of non-inferential cognition, no thought but in signs, and no conception of the absolutely incognizable—to attack philosophical Cartesianism, of which he said that:

1. "It teaches that philosophy must begin in universal doubt" – when, instead, we start with preconceptions, "prejudices [...] which it does not occur to us can be questioned", though we may find reason to question them later. "Let us not pretend to doubt in philosophy what we do not doubt in our hearts."
2. "It teaches that the ultimate test of certainty is...in the individual consciousness" – when, instead, in science a theory stays on probation till agreement is reached, then it has no actual doubters left. No lone individual can reasonably hope to fulfill philosophy's multi-generational dream. When "candid and disciplined minds" continue to disagree on a theoretical issue, even the theory's author should feel doubts about it.
3. It trusts to "a single thread of inference depending often upon inconspicuous premisses" – when, instead, philosophy should, "like the successful sciences", proceed only from tangible, scrutinizable premisses and trust not to any one argument but instead to "the multitude and variety of its arguments" as forming, not a chain at least as weak as its weakest link, but "a cable whose fibers", soever "slender, are sufficiently numerous and intimately connected".
4. It renders many facts "absolutely inexplicable, unless to say that 'God makes them so' is to be regarded as an explanation" (Note: Peirce believed in God. See section #Philosophy: metaphysics.) – when, instead, philosophy should avoid being "unidealistic", (Note: However, Peirce disagreed with Hegelian absolute idealism. See for example Collected Papers of Charles Sanders Peirce, 8.131.) misbelieving that something real can defy or evade all possible ideas, and supposing, inevitably, "some absolutely inexplicable, unanalyzable ultimate", which explanatory surmise explains nothing and so is inadmissible.

== Theory of categories ==
On May 14, 1867, the 27-year-old Peirce presented a paper entitled "On a New List of Categories" to the American Academy of Arts and Sciences, which published it the following year. The paper outlined a theory of predication, involving three universal categories that Peirce developed in response to reading Aristotle, Immanuel Kant, and G. W. F. Hegel, categories that Peirce applied throughout his work for the rest of his life. Peirce scholars generally regard the "New List" as foundational or breaking the ground for Peirce's "architectonic", his blueprint for a pragmatic philosophy. In the categories one will discern, concentrated, the pattern that one finds formed by the three grades of clearness in "How To Make Our Ideas Clear" (1878 paper foundational to pragmatism), and in numerous other trichotomies in his work.

"On a New List of Categories" is cast as a Kantian deduction; it is short but dense and difficult to summarize. The following table is compiled from that and later works. In 1893, Peirce restated most of it for a less advanced audience.

Peirce's categories (technical name: the cenopythagorean categories)
Name	Typical characterizaton	As universe of experience	As quantity	Technical definition	Valence, "adicity"
Firstness	Quality of feeling	Ideas, chance, possibility	Vagueness, "some"	Reference to a ground (a ground is a pure abstraction of a quality)	Essentially monadic (the quale, in the sense of the such, which has the quality)
Secondness	Reaction, resistance, (dyadic) relation	Brute facts, actuality	Singularity, discreteness, "this"	Reference to a correlate (by its relate)	Essentially dyadic (the relate and the correlate)
Thirdness	Representation, mediation	Habits, laws, necessity	Generality, continuity, "all"	Reference to an interpretant*	Essentially triadic (sign, object, interpretant*)

*Note: An interpretant is an interpretation (human or otherwise) in the sense of the product of an interpretive process.

== Logic, or semiotic ==
In 1918, the logician C. I. Lewis wrote, "The contributions of C.S. Peirce to symbolic logic are more numerous and varied than those of any other writer—at least in the nineteenth century."

=== Relational logic ===
Beginning with his first paper on the "Logic of Relatives" (1870), Peirce extended the theory of relations pioneered by Augustus De Morgan. (Note: Much of the mathematics of relations now taken for granted was "borrowed" from Peirce, not always with all due credit; on that and on how the young Bertrand Russell, especially his Principles of Mathematics and Principia Mathematica, did not do Peirce justice, see Anellis (1995).) Beginning in 1940, Alfred Tarski and his students rediscovered aspects of Peirce's larger vision of relational logic, developing the perspective of relation algebra.

Relational logic gained applications. In mathematics, it influenced the abstract analysis of E. H. Moore and the lattice theory of Garrett Birkhoff. In computer science, the relational model for databases was developed with Peircean ideas in work of Edgar F. Codd, who was a doctoral student of Arthur W. Burks, a Peirce scholar. In economics, relational logic was used by Frank P. Ramsey, John von Neumann, and Paul Samuelson to study preferences and utility and by Kenneth J. Arrow in Social Choice and Individual Values, following Arrow's association with Tarski at City College of New York.

=== Quantifiers ===
On Peirce and his contemporaries Ernst Schröder and Gottlob Frege, Hilary Putnam (1982) documented that Frege's work on the logic of quantifiers had little influence on his contemporaries, although it was published four years before the work of Peirce and his student Oscar Howard Mitchell. Putnam found that mathematicians and logicians learned about the logic of quantifiers through the independent work of Peirce and Mitchell, particularly through Peirce's "On the Algebra of Logic: A Contribution to the Philosophy of Notation" (1885), published in the premier American mathematical journal of the day, and cited by Peano and Schröder, among others, who ignored Frege. They also adopted and modified Peirce's notations, typographical variants of those now used. Peirce apparently was ignorant of Frege's work, despite their overlapping achievements in logic, philosophy of language, and the foundations of mathematics.

Peirce's work on formal logic had admirers besides Ernst Schröder:

- Philosophical algebraist William Kingdon Clifford and logician William Ernest Johnson, both British;
- The Polish school of logic and foundational mathematics, including Alfred Tarski;
- Arthur Prior, who praised and studied Peirce's logical work in a 1964 paper and in Formal Logic (saying on page 4 that Peirce "perhaps had a keener eye for essentials than any other logician before or since").

=== Philosophy of logic ===
A philosophy of logic, grounded in his categories and semiotic, can be extracted from Peirce's writings and, along with Peirce's logical work more generally, is exposited and defended in Hilary Putnam (1982); the Introduction in Nathan Houser et al. (1997); and Randall Dipert's chapter in Cheryl Misak (2004).

==== Logic as philosophical ====
Peirce regarded logic per se as a division of philosophy, as a normative science based on esthetics and ethics, as more basic than metaphysics, and as "the art of devising methods of research". More generally, as inference, "logic is rooted in the social principle", since inference depends on a standpoint that, in a sense, is unlimited. Peirce called (with no sense of deprecation) "mathematics of logic" much of the kind of thing which, in current research and applications, is called simply "logic". He was productive in both (philosophical) logic and logic's mathematics, which were connected deeply in his work and thought.

Peirce argued that logic is formal semiotic: the formal study of signs in the broadest sense, not only signs that are artificial, linguistic, or symbolic, but also signs that are semblances or are indexical such as reactions. Peirce held that "all this universe is perfused with signs, if it is not composed exclusively of signs", along with their representational and inferential relations. He argued that, since all thought takes time, all thought is in signs and sign processes ("semiosis") such as the inquiry process. He divided logic into: (1) speculative grammar, or stechiology, on how signs can be meaningful and, in relation to that, what kinds of signs there are, how they combine, and how some embody or incorporate others; (2) logical critic, or logic proper, on the modes of inference; and (3) speculative or universal rhetoric, or methodeutic, the philosophical theory of inquiry, including pragmatism.

==== Presuppositions of logic ====
In his "F.R.L." [First Rule of Logic] (1899), Peirce states that the first, and "in one sense, the sole", rule of reason is that, to learn, one needs to desire to learn and desire it without resting satisfied with that which one is inclined to think. So, the first rule is, to wonder. Peirce proceeds to a critical theme in research practices and the shaping of theories:

...there follows one corollary which itself deserves to be inscribed upon every wall of the city of philosophy:
Do not block the way of inquiry.

Peirce adds, that method and economy are best in research but no outright sin inheres in trying any theory in the sense that the investigation via its trial adoption can proceed unimpeded and undiscouraged, and that "the one unpardonable offence" is a philosophical barricade against truth's advance, an offense to which "metaphysicians in all ages have shown themselves the most addicted". Peirce in many writings holds that logic precedes metaphysics (ontological, religious, and physical).

Peirce goes on to list four common barriers to inquiry: (1) Assertion of absolute certainty; (2) maintaining that something is absolutely unknowable; (3) maintaining that something is absolutely inexplicable because absolutely basic or ultimate; (4) holding that perfect exactitude is possible, especially such as to quite preclude unusual and anomalous phenomena. To refuse absolute theoretical certainty is the heart of fallibilism, which Peirce unfolds into refusals to set up any of the listed barriers. Peirce elsewhere argues (1897) that logic's presupposition of fallibilism leads at length to the view that chance and continuity are very real (tychism and synechism).

The First Rule of Logic pertains to the mind's presuppositions in undertaking reason and logic; presuppositions, for instance, that truth and the real do not depend on yours or my opinion of them but do depend on representational relation and consist in the destined end in investigation taken far enough (see below). He describes such ideas as, collectively, hopes which, in particular cases, one is unable seriously to doubt.

==== Four incapacities ====
The Journal of Speculative Philosophy series (1868–1869), including
- Questions concerning certain Faculties claimed for Man (1868)
- Some Consequences of Four Incapacities (1868)
- Grounds of Validity of the Laws of Logic:
  Further Consequences of Four Incapacities (1869)

In three articles in 1868–1869, Peirce rejected mere verbal or hyperbolic doubt and first or ultimate principles, and argued that we have (as he numbered them):

1. No power of Introspection. All knowledge of the internal world comes by hypothetical reasoning from known external facts.
2. No power of Intuition (cognition without logical determination by previous cognitions). No cognitive stage is absolutely first in a process. All mental action has the form of inference.
3. No power of thinking without signs. A cognition must be interpreted in a subsequent cognition in order to be a cognition at all.
4. No conception of the absolutely incognizable.

(The above sense of the term "intuition" is almost Kant's, said Peirce. It differs from the current looser sense that encompasses instinctive or anyway half-conscious inference.)

Peirce argued that those incapacities imply the reality of the general and of the continuous, the validity of the modes of reasoning, and the falsity of philosophical Cartesianism (see below).

Peirce rejected the conception (usually ascribed to Kant) of the unknowable thing-in-itself and later said that to "dismiss make-believes" is a prerequisite for pragmatism.

==== Logic as formal semiotic ====
Peirce sought, through his wide-ranging studies through the decades, formal philosophical ways to articulate thought's processes, and also to explain the workings of science. These inextricably entangled questions of a dynamics of inquiry rooted in nature and nurture led him to develop his semiotic with very broadened conceptions of signs and inference, and, as its culmination, a theory of inquiry for the task of saying 'how science works' and devising research methods. This would be logic by the medieval definition taught for centuries: art of arts, science of sciences, having the way to the principles of all methods. Influences radiate from points on parallel lines of inquiry in Aristotle's work, in such loci as: the basic terminology of psychology in On the Soul; the founding description of sign relations in On Interpretation; and the differentiation of inference into three modes that are commonly translated into English as abduction, deduction, and induction, in the Prior Analytics, as well as inference by analogy (called paradeigma by Aristotle), which Peirce regarded as involving the other three modes.

Peirce began writing on semiotic in the 1860s, around the time when he devised his system of three categories. He called it both semiotic and semeiotic. Both are current in singular and plural. He based it on the conception of a triadic sign relation, and defined semiosis as "action, or influence, which is, or involves, a cooperation of three subjects, such as a sign, its object, and its interpretant, this tri-relative influence not being in any way resolvable into actions between pairs". As to signs in thought, Peirce emphasized the reverse: "To say, therefore, that thought cannot happen in an instant, but requires a time, is but another way of saying that every thought must be interpreted in another, or that all thought is in signs."

Peirce held that all thought is in signs, issuing in and from interpretation, where sign is the word for the broadest variety of conceivable semblances, diagrams, metaphors, symptoms, signals, designations, symbols, texts, even mental concepts and ideas, all as determinations of a mind or quasi-mind, that which at least functions like a mind, as in the work of crystals or bees—the focus is on sign action in general rather than on psychology, linguistics, or social studies (fields which he also pursued).

Inquiry is a kind of inference process, a manner of thinking and semiosis. Global divisions of ways for phenomena to stand as signs, and the subsumption of inquiry and thinking within inference as a sign process, enable the study of inquiry on semiotics' three levels:

1. Conditions for meaningfulness. Study of significatory elements and combinations, their grammar.
2. Validity, conditions for true representation. Critique of arguments in their various separate modes.
3. Conditions for determining interpretations. Methodology of inquiry in its mutually interacting modes.

Peirce uses examples often from common experience, but defines and discusses such things as assertion and interpretation in terms of philosophical logic. In a formal vein, Peirce said:

On the Definition of Logic. Logic is formal semiotic. A sign is something, A, which brings something, B, its interpretant sign, determined or created by it, into the same sort of correspondence (or a lower implied sort) with something, C, its object, as that in which itself stands to C. This definition no more involves any reference to human thought than does the definition of a line as the place within which a particle lies during a lapse of time. It is from this definition that I deduce the principles of logic by mathematical reasoning, and by mathematical reasoning that, I aver, will support criticism of Weierstrassian severity, and that is perfectly evident. The word "formal" in the definition is also defined.

== Signs ==
=== Sign relation ===
Peirce's theory of signs is known to be one of the most complex semiotic theories due to its generalistic claim. Anything is a sign—not absolutely as itself, but instead in some relation or other. The sign relation is the key. It defines three roles encompassing (1) the sign, (2) the sign's subject matter, called its object, and (3) the sign's meaning or ramification as formed into a kind of effect called its interpretant (a further sign, for example a translation). It is an irreducible triadic relation, according to Peirce. The roles are distinct even when the things that fill those roles are not. The roles are but three; a sign of an object leads to one or more interpretants, and, as signs, they lead to further interpretants.

Extension × intension = information. Two traditional approaches to sign relation, necessary though insufficient, are the way of extension (a sign's objects, also called breadth, denotation, or application) and the way of intension (the objects' characteristics, qualities, attributes referenced by the sign, also called depth, comprehension, significance, or connotation). Peirce adds a third, the way of information, including change of information, to integrate the other two approaches into a unified whole. For example, because of the equation above, if a term's total amount of information stays the same, then the more that the term 'intends' or signifies about objects, the fewer are the objects to which the term 'extends' or applies.

Determination. A sign depends on its object in such a way as to represent its object—the object enables and, in a sense, determines the sign. A physically causal sense of this stands out when a sign consists in an indicative reaction. The interpretant depends likewise on both the sign and the object—an object determines a sign to determine an interpretant. But this determination is not a succession of dyadic events, like a row of toppling dominoes; sign determination is triadic. For example, an interpretant does not merely represent something which represented an object; instead an interpretant represents something as a sign representing the object. The object (be it a quality or fact or law or even fictional) determines the sign to an interpretant through one's collateral experience with the object, in which the object is found or from which it is recalled, as when a sign consists in a chance semblance of an absent object. Peirce used the word "determine" not in a strictly deterministic sense, but in a sense of "specializes", bestimmt, involving variable amount, like an influence. Peirce came to define representation and interpretation in terms of (triadic) determination. The object determines the sign to determine another sign—the interpretant—to be related to the object as the sign is related to the object, hence the interpretant, fulfilling its function as sign of the object, determines a further interpretant sign. The process is logically structured to perpetuate itself, and is definitive of sign, object, and interpretant in general.

=== Semiotic elements ===
Peirce held there are exactly three basic elements in semiosis (sign action):

1. A sign (or representamen) (Note: Representamen (/ˌrɛprɪzɛnˈteɪmən/ REP-ri-zen-TAY-mən) was adopted (not coined) by Peirce as his technical term for the sign as covered in his theory, in case a divergence should come to light between his theoretical version and the popular senses of the word "sign". He eventually stopped using "representamen". See The Essential Peirce, 2:272–273 and Semiotic and Significs p. 193, quotes in "Representamen" at Commens Digital Companion to C.S. Peirce.) represents, in the broadest possible sense of "represents". It is something interpretable as saying something about something. It is not necessarily symbolic, linguistic, or artificial—a cloud might be a sign of rain for instance, or ruins the sign of ancient civilization. As Peirce sometimes put it (he defined sign at least 76 times), the sign stands for the object to the interpretant. A sign represents its object in some respect, which respect is the sign's ground.
2. An object (or semiotic object) is a subject matter of a sign and an interpretant. It can be anything thinkable, a quality, an occurrence, a rule, etc., even fictional, such as Prince Hamlet. All of those are special or partial objects. The object most accurately is the universe of discourse to which the partial or special object belongs. For instance, a perturbation of Pluto's orbit is a sign about Pluto but ultimately not only about Pluto. An object either (i) is immediate to a sign and is the object as represented in the sign or (ii) is a dynamic object, the object as it really is, on which the immediate object is founded "as on bedrock".
3. An interpretant (or interpretant sign) is a sign's meaning or ramification as formed into a kind of idea or effect, an interpretation, human or otherwise. An interpretant is a sign (a) of the object and (b) of the interpretant's "predecessor" (the interpreted sign) as a sign of the same object. An interpretant either (i) is immediate to a sign and is a kind of quality or possibility such as a word's usual meaning, or (ii) is a dynamic interpretant, such as a state of agitation, or (iii) is a final or normal interpretant, a sum of the lessons which a sufficiently considered sign would have as effects on practice, and with which an actual interpretant may at most coincide.

Some of the understanding needed by the mind depends on familiarity with the object. To know what a given sign denotes, the mind needs some experience of that sign's object, experience outside of, and collateral to, that sign or sign system. In that context Peirce speaks of collateral experience, collateral observation, collateral acquaintance, all in much the same terms.

=== Classes of signs ===
Lines of joint classification of signs. Every sign is:
	1.		2.		3.
I.	Qualisign	or	Sinsign	or	Legisign
and
II.	Icon	or	Index	or	Symbol
and
III.	Rheme	or	Dicisign	or	Argument

Among Peirce's many sign typologies, three stand out, interlocked. The first typology depends on the sign itself, the second on how the sign stands for its denoted object, and the third on how the sign stands for its object to its interpretant. Also, each of the three typologies is a three-way division, a trichotomy, via Peirce's three phenomenological categories: (1) quality of feeling, (2) reaction, resistance, and (3) representation, mediation.

I. Qualisign, sinsign, legisign (also called tone, token, type, and also called potisign, actisign, famisign): This typology classifies every sign according to the sign's own phenomenological category—the qualisign is a quality, a possibility, a "First"; the sinsign is a reaction or resistance, a singular object, an actual event or fact, a "Second"; and the legisign is a habit, a rule, a representational relation, a "Third".

II. Icon, index, symbol: This typology, the best known one, classifies every sign according to the category of the sign's way of denoting its object—the icon (also called semblance or likeness) by a quality of its own, the index by factual connection to its object, and the symbol by a habit or rule for its interpretant.

III. Rheme, dicisign, argument (also called sumisign, dicisign, suadisign, also seme, pheme, delome, and regarded as very broadened versions of the traditional term, proposition, argument): This typology classifies every sign according to the category which the interpretant attributes to the sign's way of denoting its object—the rheme, for example a term, is a sign interpreted to represent its object in respect of quality; the dicisign, for example a proposition, is a sign interpreted to represent its object in respect of fact; and the argument is a sign interpreted to represent its object in respect of habit or law. This is the culminating typology of the three, where the sign is understood as a structural element of inference.

Every sign belongs to one class or another within (I) and within (II) and within (III). Thus each of the three typologies is a three-valued parameter for every sign. The three parameters are not independent of each other; many co-classifications are absent, for reasons pertaining to the lack of either habit-taking or singular reaction in a quality, and the lack of habit-taking in a singular reaction. The result is not 27 but instead ten classes of signs fully specified at this level of analysis.

== Modes of inference ==
Borrowing a brace of concepts from Aristotle, Peirce examined three basic modes of inference—abduction, deduction, and induction—in his "critique of arguments" or "logic proper". Peirce also called abduction "retroduction", "presumption", and, earliest of all, "hypothesis". He characterized it as guessing and as inference to an explanatory hypothesis. He sometimes expounded the modes of inference by transformations of the categorical syllogism Barbara (AAA), for example in "Deduction, Induction, and Hypothesis" (1878). He does this by rearranging the rule (Barbara's major premise), the case (Barbara's minor premise), and the result (Barbara's conclusion):

Deduction	Induction	Hypothesis (Abduction)
Rule: All the beans from this bag are white. Case: These beans are beans from this bag. $\therefore$ Result: These beans are white.	Case: These beans are [randomly selected] from this bag. Result: These beans are white. $\therefore$ Rule: All the beans from this bag are white.	Rule: All the beans from this bag are white. Result: These beans [oddly] are white. $\therefore$ Case: These beans are from this bag.

In 1883, in "A Theory of Probable Inference" (Studies in Logic), Peirce equated hypothetical inference with the induction of characters of objects (as he had done in effect before). Eventually dissatisfied, by 1900 he distinguished them once and for all and also wrote that he now took the syllogistic forms and the doctrine of logical extension and comprehension as being less basic than he had thought. In 1903 he presented the following logical form for abductive inference:

The surprising fact, C, is observed;

But if A were true, C would be a matter of course,
Hence, there is reason to suspect that A is true.

The logical form does not also cover induction, since induction neither depends on surprise nor proposes a new idea for its conclusion. Induction seeks facts to test a hypothesis; abduction seeks a hypothesis to account for facts. "Deduction proves that something must be; Induction shows that something actually is operative; Abduction merely suggests that something may be." Peirce did not remain quite convinced that one logical form covers all abduction. In his methodeutic or theory of inquiry (see below), he portrayed abduction as an economic initiative to further inference and study, and portrayed all three modes as clarified by their coordination in essential roles in inquiry: hypothetical explanation, deductive prediction, inductive testing.

== Metaphysics ==
Peirce divided metaphysics into (1) ontology or general metaphysics, (2) psychical or religious metaphysics, and (3) physical metaphysics.

=== Ontology ===
On the issue of universals, Peirce was a scholastic realist, declaring the reality of generals as early as 1868. According to Peirce, his category he called "thirdness", the more general facts about the world, are extra-mental realities. Regarding modalities (possibility, necessity, etc.), he came in later years to regard himself as having wavered earlier as to just how positively real the modalities are. In his 1897 "The Logic of Relatives" he wrote:

I formerly defined the possible as that which in a given state of information (real or feigned) we do not know not to be true. But this definition today seems to me only a twisted phrase which, by means of two negatives, conceals an anacoluthon. We know in advance of experience that certain things are not true, because we see they are impossible.

Peirce retained, as useful for some purposes, the definitions in terms of information states, but insisted that the pragmaticist is committed to a strong modal realism by conceiving of objects in terms of predictive general conditional propositions about how they would behave under certain circumstances.

==== Continua ====
Continuity and synechism are central in Peirce's philosophy: "I did not at first suppose that it was, as I gradually came to find it, the master-Key of philosophy".

From a mathematical point of view, he embraced infinitesimals and worked long on the mathematics of continua. He long held that the real numbers constitute a pseudo-continuum; that a true continuum is the real subject matter of analysis situs (topology); and that a true continuum of instants exceeds—and within any lapse of time has room for—any Aleph number (any infinite multitude as he called it) of instants.

In 1908 Peirce wrote that he found that a true continuum might have or lack such room. Jérôme Havenel (2008): "It is on 26 May 1908, that Peirce finally gave up his idea that in every continuum there is room for whatever collection of any multitude. From now on, there are different kinds of continua, which have different properties."

=== Psychical or religious metaphysics ===
Peirce believed in God, and characterized such belief as founded in an instinct explorable in musing over the worlds of ideas, brute facts, and evolving habits—and it is a belief in God not as an actual or existent being (in Peirce's sense of those words), but all the same as a real being. In "A Neglected Argument for the Reality of God" (1908), Peirce sketches, for God's reality, an argument to a hypothesis of God as the Necessary Being, a hypothesis which he describes in terms of how it would tend to develop and become compelling in musement and inquiry by a normal person who is led, by the hypothesis, to consider as being purposed the features of the worlds of ideas, brute facts, and evolving habits (for example scientific progress), such that the thought of such purposefulness will "stand or fall with the hypothesis"; meanwhile, according to Peirce, the hypothesis, in supposing an "infinitely incomprehensible" being, starts off at odds with its own nature as a purportively true conception, and so, no matter how much the hypothesis grows, it both (A) inevitably regards itself as partly true, partly vague, and as continuing to define itself without limit, and (B) inevitably has God appearing likewise vague but growing, though God as the Necessary Being is not vague or growing; but the hypothesis will hold it to be more false to say the opposite, that God is purposeless. Peirce also argued that the will is free and (see Synechism) that there is at least an attenuated kind of immortality.

=== Physical metaphysics ===
Peirce held the view, which he called objective idealism, that "matter is effete mind, inveterate habits becoming physical laws". Peirce observed that "Berkeley's metaphysical theories have at first sight an air of paradox and levity very unbecoming to a bishop".

Peirce asserted the reality of (1) "absolute chance" or randomness (his tychist view), (2) "mechanical necessity" or physical laws (anancist view), and (3) what he called the "law of love" (agapist view), echoing his categories Firstness, Secondness, and Thirdness, respectively. He held that fortuitous variation (which he also called "sporting"), mechanical necessity, and creative love are the three modes of evolution (modes called "tychasm", "anancasm", and "agapasm") of the cosmos and its parts. He found his conception of agapasm embodied in Lamarckian evolution; the overall idea in any case is that of evolution tending toward an end or goal, and it could also be the evolution of a mind or a society; it is the kind of evolution which manifests workings of mind in some general sense. He said that overall he was a synechist, holding with reality of continuity, especially of space, time, and law.

=== Some noted articles ===
- The Monist Metaphysical Series (1891–1893)
  - The Architecture of Theories (1891)
  - The Doctrine of Necessity Examined (1892)
  - The Law of Mind (1892)
  - Man's Glassy Essence (1892)
  - Evolutionary Love (1893)
- Immortality in the Light of Synechism (1893 MS)

== Philosophy of science ==
Peirce outlined two fields, "Cenoscopy" and "Science of Review", both of which he called "philosophy". Both included philosophy about science. In 1903 he arranged them, from more to less theoretically basic, thus:

1. Science of Discovery.
  1. Mathematics.
  2. Cenoscopy (philosophy as discussed earlier in this article – categorial, normative, metaphysical), as First Philosophy, concerns positive phenomena in general, does not rely on findings from special sciences, and includes the general study of inquiry and scientific method.
  3. Idioscopy, or the Special Sciences (of nature and mind).
2. Science of Review, as Ultimate Philosophy, arranges "... the results of discovery, beginning with digests, and going on to endeavor to form a philosophy of science". His examples included Humboldt's Cosmos, Comte's Philosophie positive, and Spencer's Synthetic Philosophy.
3. Practical Science, or the Arts.

Peirce placed, within Science of Review, the work and theory of classifying the sciences (including mathematics and philosophy). His classifications, on which he worked for many years, draw on argument and wide knowledge, and are of interest both as a map for navigating his philosophy and as an accomplished polymath's survey of research in his time.

Peirce also did work relating to generic evolutionary theory.

== See also ==
- History of the metre
- Howland will forgery trial
- Hypostatic abstraction
- Idea § Charles Sanders Peirce
- Laws of Form
- List of American philosophers
- List of pioneers in computer science
- Logical machine
- Logical matrix
- Mathematical psychology
- Normal distribution § Naming
- Peircean realism
- Pragmatics
- Problem of universals § Peirce
- Quantification (science) § History
- Relation algebra
- Truth table
- Philosophy of science

=== Contemporaries associated with Peirce ===
- Oliver Wendell Holmes Jr.
- George Herbert Mead
