= Agapism =

Belief in agape

Agapism is belief in selfless, charitable, non-erotic (brotherly) love, spiritual love, love of the soul. It can mean belief that such love (or "agape") should be the sole ultimate value and that all other values are derived from it, or that the sole moral imperative is to love. Theological agapism holds that our love of God is expressed by loving each other. As the ethics of love, agapism indicates that we should do the most loving thing in each situation, letting love determine our obligation rather than rules. Alternatively, given a set of rules, agapism indicates to follow those rules which produce the most love.

In 1851, the English journalist and social researcher Henry Mayhew, discussing means to "a more general and equal division of the wealth of the country", characterized agapism as "the voluntary sharing of individual possessions with the less fortunate or successful members of the community" and as the alternative to communism ("the abolition of all rights to individual property").

In 1893, the American philosopher Charles Sanders Peirce used the word "agapism" for the view that creative love is operative in the cosmos. Drawing from the Swedenborgian ideas of Henry James, Sr. which he had absorbed long before, Peirce held that it involves a love which expresses itself in a devotion to cherishing and tending to people or things other than oneself, as parent may do for offspring, and as God, as Love, does even and especially for the unloving, whereby the loved ones may learn. Peirce regarded this process as a mode of evolution of the cosmos and its parts, and he called the process "agapasm", such that: "The good result is here brought to pass, first, by the bestowal of spontaneous energy by the parent upon the offspring, and, second, by the disposition of the latter to catch the general idea of those about it and thus to subserve the general purpose." Peirce held that there are three such principles and three associated modes of evolution:

"Three modes of evolution have thus been brought before us: evolution by fortuitous variation, evolution by mechanical necessity, and evolution by creative love. We may term them tychastic evolution, or tychasm, anancastic evolution, or anancasm, and agapastic evolution, or agapasm. The doctrines which represent these as severally of principal importance we may term tychasticism, anancasticism, and agapasticism. On the other hand the mere propositions that absolute chance, mechanical necessity, and the law of love are severally operative in the cosmos may receive the names of tychism, anancism, and agapism." — C. S. Peirce, 1893
