= Ac-Cent-Tchu-Ate the Positive =

1944 song

Single by Johnny Mercer and The Pied Pipers with Paul Weston Orchestra
- B-side: "There’s a Fellow Waiting in Poughkeepsie"
- Released: 1944
- Recorded: October 4, 1944
- Genre: Jazz; traditional pop
- Label: Capitol
- Songwriters: Harold Arlen; Johnny Mercer

"Ac-Cent-Tchu-Ate the Positive" is a popular song, published in 1944. The music was written by Harold Arlen and the lyric by Johnny Mercer. It was nominated for the Academy Award for Best Original Song at the 18th Academy Awards in 1945 after being used in the film Here Come the Waves.

== Background ==
It is sung in the style of a sermon, and explains accentuating the positive is key to happiness. In describing his inspiration for the lyric, Mercer told the Pop Chronicles radio documentary: "...[my] publicity agent ... went to hear Father Divine and he had a sermon and his subject was 'you got to accentuate the positive and eliminate the negative'. And I said 'Wow, that's a colorful phrase!'"

== Chart performance ==
Mercer recorded the song, with The Pied Pipers and Paul Weston's orchestra, on October 4, 1944, and it was released by Capitol Records as catalog number 180. The record first reached the Billboard magazine charts on January 4, 1945, and lasted 13 weeks on the chart, peaking at number 2. On the Harlem Hit Parade chart, it went to number four. The song was number five on Billboard's Annual High School Survey in 1945.

On March 25, 2015, it was announced that Mercer's version would be inducted into the Library of Congress's National Recording Registry for the song's "cultural, artistic and/or historical significance to American society and the nation’s audio legacy".

== Other recordings ==
Within a matter of weeks, several other recordings of the song were released by other well-known artists:

- Bing Crosby and The Andrews Sisters made a recording on December 8, 1944, with Vic Schoen and his Orchestra, which was released by Decca Records as catalog number 23379. The record first reached the Billboard charts on January 25, 1945, and lasted nine weeks on the chart, peaking at number 2.
- A recording by Artie Shaw's band with Imogene Lynn on vocals was released by RCA Victor Records as catalog number 20-1612. The record first reached the Billboard magazine charts on January 25, 1945, and lasted five weeks on the chart, peaking at number 5.Other popular versions were recorded by such artists as Jools Holland and Louis Armstrong.

== See also ==
- Posi music
