= Universal rhetoric =

Concept in Peirce's philosophy

Universal rhetoric is a central concept in Charles Sanders Peirce's philosophy. According to Peirce, the main purpose of universal rhetoric is to consider questions of inquiry in the context of community, and "the very origin of the conception of reality shows that this conception ultimately involves a COMMUNITY, without definite limits, and capable of a definite increase of knowledge."

Peirce alternatively called it speculative rhetoric, general rhetoric, formal rhetoric, objective logic, or methodeutic. It constitutes the third and last branch of his general theory of signs.

== See also ==
- Universal pragmatics
