= Charles S. Peirce Society =

- Established: 1946; 80 years ago
- Mission: The study of Charles Sanders Peirce
- President: Rosa M. Mayorga
- Key people: Cornelis de Waal (President)
- Location: United States
- Website: peircesociety.org

The Charles S. Peirce Society (CSPS) is an American organization which purpose is to enhance "study of and communication about the work of philosopher Charles S. Peirce and its ongoing influence in the many fields of intellectual endeavor to which he contributed".

== History ==
The society was founded in 1946. Its Transactions of the Charles S. Peirce Society, an academic quarterly specializing in pragmatism and American philosophy, has appeared since 1965.
