= Posi music =

Short for "positive music"

Posi music (in American English, pronounced POZ-ee) is a colloquial phrase that some modern listeners some have applied retroactively to music and songs in this genre that have been around since the at least the 1940s,. It is not widely adopted or accepted. Short for positive music, posi music is categorized by its intention to have a positive uplifting effect on the listener. Musicians who write and perform posi music profess a desire for their music to unite and inspire their audience and make them feel better. An example is "Accentuate The Positive" written by Johnny Mercer and made famous by Bing Crosby. The song defined the concept that there is polarity between being positive or being negative, specifically noting there is also no neutral as in "no more Mister In-Between".

This concept has been expanded by groups promoting the education of posi music, such as the Positive Music Association, emPower Music and Arts, and the Positive Music Imperative. This concept of Positive Music and Negative music has also been identified in the book A New Earth, by Eckhart Tolle

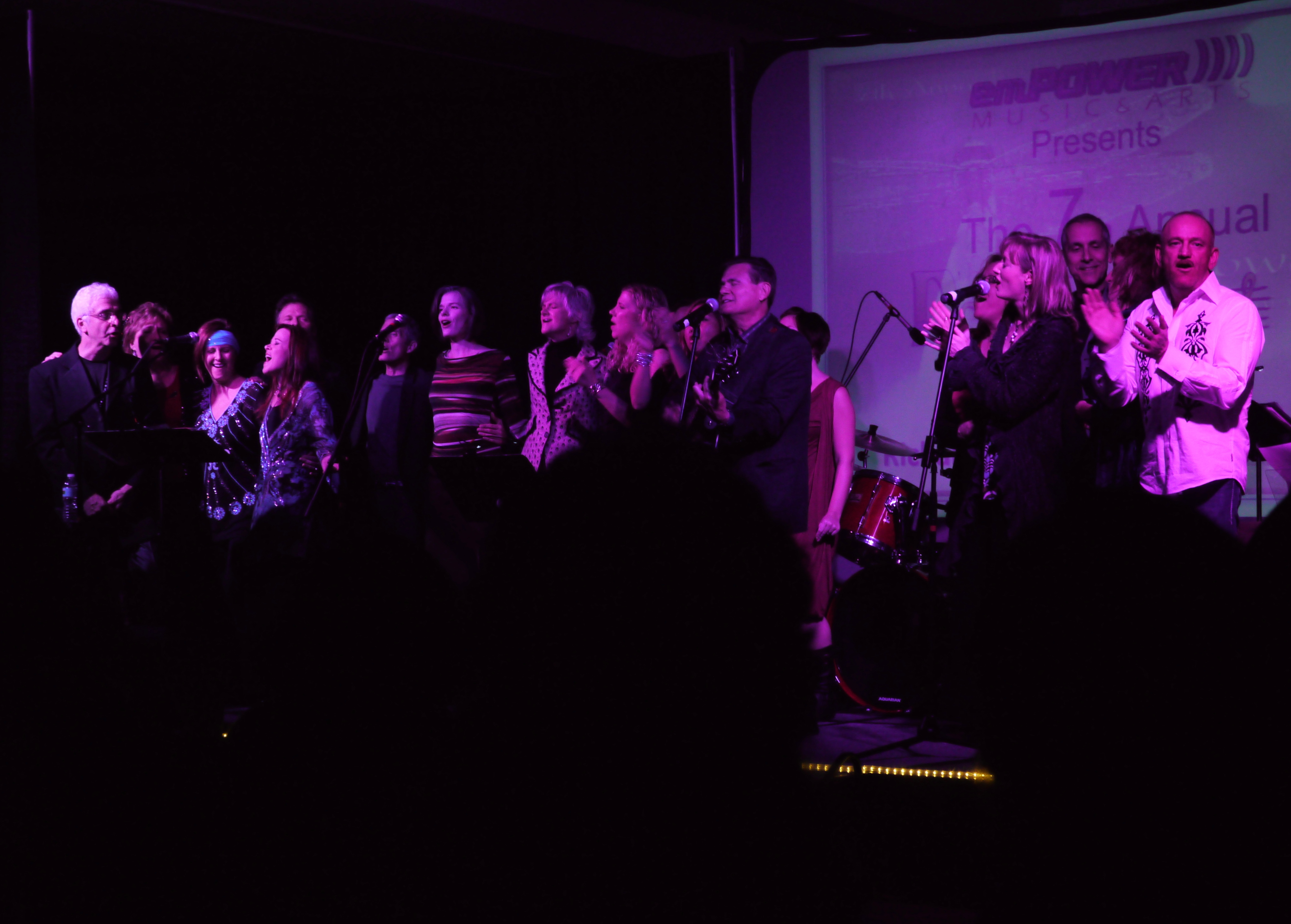
A sing-a-long at the 2012 Posi Awards in Orlando, Fl

== Origins ==
Early posi music certainly had some roots in traditional folk music, in the genre labeled protest music. While much of protest music would not fit into the simple definition of posi music, a subjective opinion could easily include songs like "We Shall Overcome" by Pete Seeger or "If I Had a Hammer" performed by Peter Paul and Mary.

Deeper roots were nourished by New Thought musicians and posi music finally emerged as a fully defined concept when pioneers of the genre, Karl Anthony, Shanti Norman, Charley Thweatt, and Leroy White created music that was not focused on theology, but instead on more inclusive themes. Unlike gospel and contemporary worship music, posi music's lyrics are less specifically spiritual. By focusing on the human spirit and world community, posi music embraces musicians from any religion. As the genre has evolved, it has been adopted by artists following many different spiritual paths ranging from New Thought, Agapism, Judaism, Christian Science and Catholicism to Buddhism, Pantheism and Seicho-no-Ie.

Posi music artists dedicate most or all of their music to uplifting or motivational topics. A selection of mainstream pop music also fits the genre by including posi-related themes like friendship and gratitude. Examples include hit songs like "You've Got A Friend" by James Taylor, "Bridge Over Troubled Water" by Simon and Garfunkel, or "Thank You For Being A Friend" by Andrew Gold. Other well-known songs like Bob Hope's "Thanks for the Memory" and "Thank You" by Dido or Natalie Merchant also feature themes of gratitude and positivity.

== Style ==
Posi music is described as being upbeat and uplifting music. Usually it centers around the lyrics rather than the music itself. Often it is affirmational, though sometimes it is a call directing the listener to make changes to how they live. Posi music can be spiritual, but it is not specifically religious in nature. This is by design, as posi music is meant to be enjoyed by people of all faiths.

== Uses ==
Posi music can be used in many settings beyond spiritual communities. Posi music is marketed for use in retreats, workshops, fitness centers, counseling centers, therapy, nursing homes and hospitals. The themes in posi music are ideal for programs such as Arts in Medicine, where music is used to promote healing.

Uses of posi music have expanded to include motivational music for work-outs and companies like Amway have used motivational music to inspire their distributors. In 2008 Barack Obama used posi music in his Yes We Can campaign by enlisting artist support like India.Arie with songs like "There's Hope" and "I Gotta Feeling" by The Black Eyed Peas.

== Events ==
November has been declared Posi Music Month by many notable musicians in the genre. Fans are encouraged to "fast" from negative music and go on a "diet" of positive music for the month.

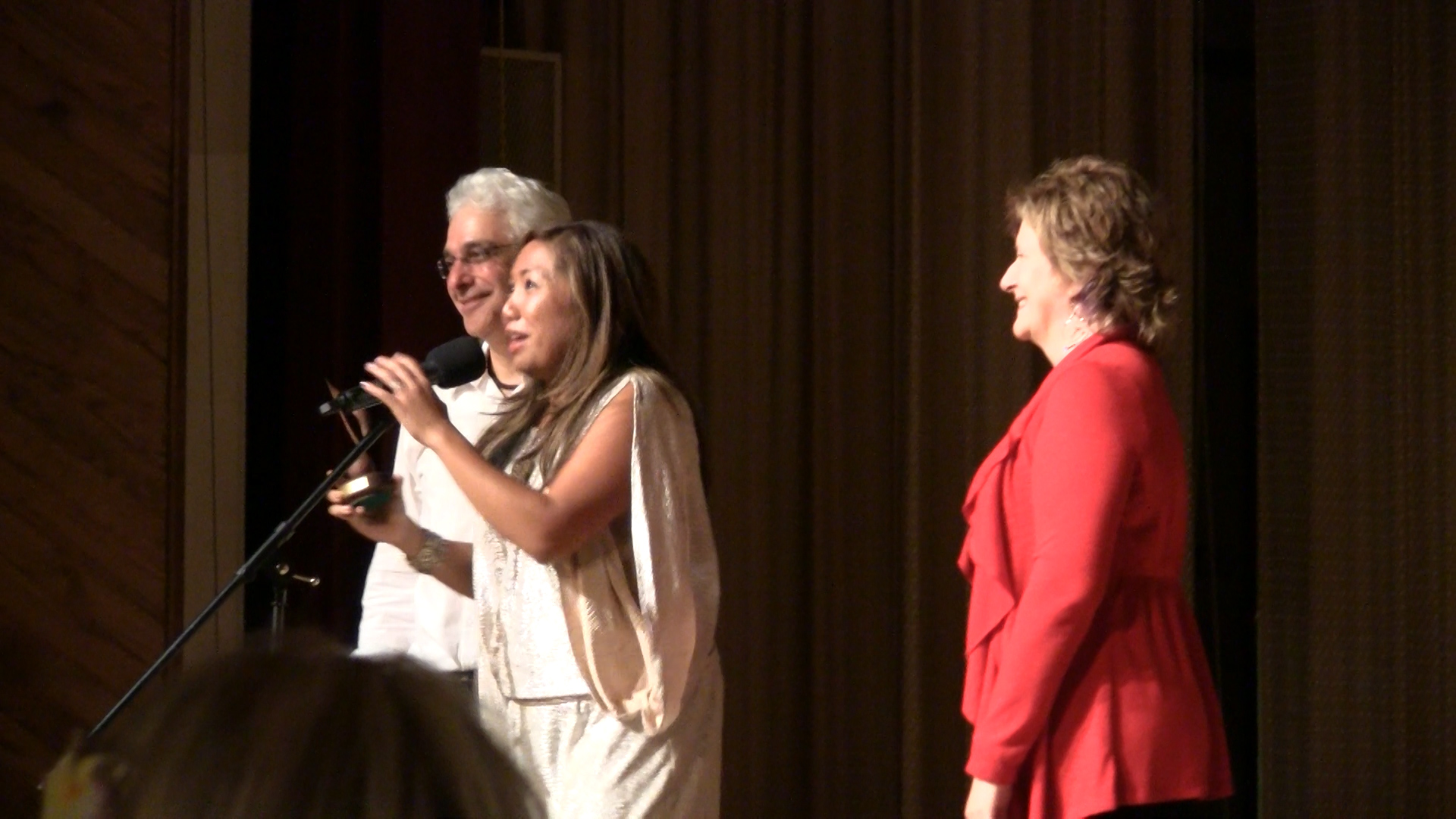
Faith Rivera receives the Grace Note Award and gives special thanks to Richard Mekdeci and Sue K Riley
