= Synechism =

Bias towards continuity

Synechism (from Greek συνεχής synechḗs, "continuous" + -ism, from σύν syn, "together" + ἔχειν échein>, "to have", "to hold") is a philosophical term proposed by C. S. Peirce to express the tendency to regard things such as space, time, and law as continuous:

The things of this world, that seem so transitory to philosophers, are not continuous. They are composed of discrete atoms, no doubt Boscovichian points. The really continuous things, Space, and Time, and Law, are eternal.

His synechism holds that the essential feature in philosophic speculation is continuity. It denies that all is merely ideas, likewise that all is merely matter, and mind–matter dualism.

The adjective "synechological" is used in the same general sense; "synechology" is a theory of continuity or universal causation; "synechia" is a term in ophthalmology for a morbid union of parts.

== The Categories ==
Peirce held that there are three elements or categories throughout experience:

- Firstness, quality of feeling—possibility, idea, vagueness, chance, "some".
- Secondness, reaction, resistance—actuality, brute fact, individuality, discreteness, "this".
- Thirdness, representation, mediation—necessity or destiny, habit, law, generality, continuity, "all".

Peirce held that firstness and secondness, as elements, give thirdness and continuity something upon which to operate, and that continuity governs all experience and every element in it.

== Hypotheses ==
Synechism is specially directed to the question of hypothesis, and holds that a hypothesis is justifiable only on the ground that it provides an explanation. All understanding of facts consists in generalizing concerning them. Generalization is seen as movement by thought toward continuity. The fact that some things are ultimate may be recognized by the synechist without abandoning his standpoint, since synechism is a normative or regulative principle, not a theory of existence.

== Immortality ==
In a contribution to an 1887 symposium Science and Immortality, Peirce had said that the question stood undecided on whether there is immortality or at least "a future life", but also that science could come to shed light on the question.

In an 1893 manuscript "Immortality in the Light of Synechism," Peirce applied his doctrine of synechism to the question of the soul's immortality in order to argue in the affirmative. According to Peirce, synechism flatly denies Parmenides's claim that "Being is, and non-being is nothing" and declares instead that "being is a matter of more or less, so as to merge insensibly into nothing." Peirce argued that the view that "no experiential question can be answered with absolute certainty" (fallibilism) implies the view that "the object has an imperfect and qualified existence" and implies, furthermore, the view that there is no absolute distinction between a phenomenon and its substrate, and among various persons, and between waking and sleeping; one who takes on a role in creation's drama identifies to that extent with creation's author. Carnal consciousness, according to Peirce's synechism, does not cease quickly upon death, and is a small part of a person, for there is also social consciousness: one's spirit really does live on in others; and there is also spiritual consciousness, which we confuse with other things, and in which one is constituted as an eternal truth "embodied by the universe as a whole": that eternal truth "as an archetypal idea can never fail; and in the world to come is destined to a special spiritual embodiment." Peirce said in conclusion that synechism is not religion but scientific philosophy, but could come to unify religion and science.

Around 1906, Peirce reaffirmed some of the above forms of immortality, but added, "If I am in another life it is sure to be most interesting; but I cannot imagine how it is going to be me. At the same time, I really don't know anything about it," and that mental action's dependence on the brain was an assumption warranted in science by facts until contrary facts come to light, but from the standpoint of practical interest the dependence remained open to some doubt.

== See also ==
- Continuous predicate
- Monism
- Panpsychism
- Pluralism
- Pragmatism
