= Randall Dipert =

American philosopher and professor (1951–2019)

- Born: Randall Roy Dipert; January 16, 1951; Findlay, Ohio, US
- Died: June 23, 2019 (aged 68); Angola, Indiana, US

Education
- Education: University of Michigan (BA); Indiana University Bloomington (PhD)
- Thesis: Development and Crisis in Late Boolean Logic: The Deductive Logics of Peirce, Jevons and Schröder (1978)

Philosophical work
- Institutions: State University of New York at Fredonia; United States Military Academy; University at Buffalo
- Main interests: Philosophy of logic; Pragmatism; philosophy of war

Randall Roy Dipert (/ˈdaɪpɜːt/; 1951–2019) was an American philosopher and professor of philosophy at the State University of New York at Fredonia, the United States Military Academy, and the University at Buffalo where he retired as the C. S. Peirce Chair of American Philosophy.

== Works ==
Books

- 1985. (with William Rapaport and Morton Schagrin) Logic: A Computer Approach. McGraw-Hill. ISBN 0-070-55131-6, ISBN 978-0-070-55131-2
- 1993. Artifacts, Art Works, and Agency. Philadelphia: Temple University Press. ISBN 0-877-22990-2, ISBN 978-0-877-22990-2
