= Cornelis de Waal =

American philosopher (born 1962)

Cornelis de Waal (May 30, 1962) is a Dutch Professor of American Philosophy at Indiana University. He is Editor-in-Chief of Transactions (the Charles S. Peirce Society).

== Selected publications ==
- Peirce: A Guide for the Perplexed. London: Bloomsbury, 2013. Translated into Korean as Peoseu Chualhakeui Eehae, Seoul: Hankuk University Press, 2016.
- On Pragmatism. Belmont: Wadsworth, 2005. Translated into Portuguese as Sobre pragmatism. São Paulo: Edições Loyola, 2007.
- On Mead. Belmont: Wadsworth, 2002.
- On Peirce. Belmont: Wadsworth, 2001. Translated into Chinese as Pi Er Shi. Beijing: Zhong Hua Book Co., 2003; and in Bulgarian as За Пърс. Sofia: New Bulgarian University Press, 2015.
