= Carolyn Eisele =

American mathematician and historian (1902–2000)

- Born: June 13, 1902; The Bronx, New York City
- Died: January 15, 2000 (aged 97)
- Citizenship: American
- Education: Columbia University
- Scientific career
- Fields: Mathematician

Carolyn Eisele (June 13, 1902 – January 15, 2000) was an American mathematician and historian of mathematics known as an expert on the works of Charles Sanders Peirce.

== Education and career ==
Eisele was born on June 13, 1902, in The Bronx, New York City. She studied at Hunter College High School and then Hunter College, graduating Phi Beta Kappa in 1923. She earned a master's degree in mathematics and education from Columbia University in 1925. At that time, Columbia did not offer Ph.D.s in mathematics to women, but Eisele continued her graduate studies at the University of Chicago (where she studied differential geometry) and the University of Southern California before returning home to New York, without a doctorate, to care for her heavily injured father. Her studies also included opera singing, with Jeanne Fourestier in Paris in 1931 and later with Los Angeles-based voice coach Morris Halpern, whom she married in 1943.

Eisele taught mathematics at Hunter College for nearly 50 years. She began teaching as an instructor there after her college graduation in 1923, eventually reached the rank of full professor in 1965, and retired in 1972.

Eisele died on January 15, 2000 in Manhattan, New York City.

== Peirce studies ==
As a student at Columbia University, Eisele took a course in the history of mathematics from David Eugene Smith, but her professional contributions to the subject began in 1947, when she took a sabbatical to prepare for a course in the history of mathematics that she had been asked to teach at Hunter College. While working in the George Arthur Plimpton collection at the Columbia University library, she found a manuscript by Charles Sanders Peirce on Fibonacci's Liber Abaci and in 1951 she published a paper about her discovery in Scripta Mathematica. Other early works of Eisele on Peirce included his correspondence with Simon Newcomb and his Peirce quincuncial projection for maps of the world. Her work on Peirce took a holistic view, in which his contributions to philosophy and logic were treated as part of a whole together with his contributions to mathematics and science, rather than as separate and unrelated chapters in his life.

Eisele served as the president of the Charles S. Peirce Society from 1973 to 1975. In 1976, Eisele began publishing a multi-volume collection of Peirce's writings that she had edited, the New Elements of Mathematics, and in the same year she helped organize the Peirce Bicentennial International Congress in Amsterdam.

== Books ==
- Studies in the Science and Mathematical Philosophy of Charles S. Peirce: Essays by Carolyn Eisele (1979)
- Historical Perspectives on Peirce’s Logic of Science: A History of Science (1985)

== Awards and honors ==
Eisele was named a Fellow of the American Association for the Advancement of Science in 1960.

On her retirement from Hunter College in 1972, Eisele joined the Hunter Hall of Fame. She was given honorary doctorates from Texas Tech University in 1980 and from Lehigh University in 1982.

In 1980, Eisele became an honorary member of the crew of the United States Coast Guard ship USC&GSS Peirce. In 1981, a symposium on Peirce studies was held in her honor at Hunter College, the proceedings of which were published as a festschrift in Historia Mathematica. In 1985, Eisele was given the Behavioral Sciences, History and Philosophy of Sciences award from the New York Academy of Sciences. Her other honors include a Doctor of Humanities degree awarded by Texas Tech University in 1980 and a Doctor of Science degree awarded in 1982 by Lehigh University.
