= Daily Nous =

News site about academic philosophy

Daily Nous is a website covering news about philosophy and the philosophy profession. It is considered one of the "big" or "popular" philosophy blogs and a "popular philosophy news website". Daily Nous is edited by Justin Weinberg, associate professor of philosophy at the University of South Carolina. The site was created on March 7, 2014.

Daily Nous has been cited by writers and media outlets discussing or reporting on the philosophy profession, and by scholars writing on various subjects.
