= Necessitarianism =

Metaphysical principle

Necessitarianism is a metaphysical principle that denies all mere possibility; there is exactly one way for the world to be.

It is the strongest member of a family of principles, including hard determinism, each of which deny libertarian free will, reasoning that human actions are predetermined by external or internal antecedents. Necessitarianism is stronger than hard determinism, because even the hard determinist would grant that the causal chain constituting the world might have been different as a whole, even though each member of that series could not have been different, given its antecedent causes.

The most famous defender of necessitarianism in the history of philosophy is Spinoza.

Anthony Collins was also known for his defense of necessitarianism. His brief Inquiry Concerning Human Liberty (1715) was a key statement of the necessitarianist standpoint.

The Century Dictionary defined it in 1889–91 as belief that the will is not free, but instead subject to external antecedent causes or natural laws of cause and effect.

== See also ==
- Determinism
- Mechanical philosophy
- Modal logic
- Necessity and sufficiency
