= Categories (Peirce) =

Philosophical concept

On May 14, 1867, the 27–year-old Charles Sanders Peirce, who eventually founded pragmatism, presented a paper entitled "On a New List of Categories" to the American Academy of Arts and Sciences. Among other things, this paper outlined a theory of predication involving three universal categories that Peirce continued to apply in philosophy and elsewhere for the rest of his life. The categories demonstrate and concentrate the pattern seen in "How to Make Our Ideas Clear" (1878, the foundational paper for pragmatism), and other three-way distinctions in Peirce's work.

== The categories ==
In Aristotle's logic, categories are adjuncts to reasoning that are designed to resolve equivocations: ambiguities that make expressions or signs recalcitrant to being ruled by logic. Categories help the reasoner to render signs ready for the application of logical laws. An equivocation is a variation in meaning—a manifold of sign senses—such that, as Aristotle put it about names in the opening of Categories (1.1^{a}1–12), "Things are said to be named 'equivocally' when, though they have a common name, the definition corresponding with the name differs for each." So Peirce's claim that three categories are sufficient amounts to an assertion that all manifolds of meaning can be unified in just three steps.

The following passage is critical to the understanding of Peirce's Categories:

I will now say a few words about what you have called Categories, but for which I prefer the designation Predicaments, and which you have explained as predicates of predicates.

That wonderful operation of hypostatic abstraction by which we seem to create entia rationis that are, nevertheless, sometimes real, furnishes us the means of turning predicates from being signs that we think or think through, into being subjects thought of. We thus think of the thought-sign itself, making it the object of another thought-sign.

Thereupon, we can repeat the operation of hypostatic abstraction, and from these second intentions derive third intentions. Does this series proceed endlessly? I think not. What then are the characters of its different members?

My thoughts on this subject are not yet harvested. I will only say that the subject concerns Logic, but that the divisions so obtained must not be confounded with the different Modes of Being: Actuality, Possibility, Destiny (or Freedom from Destiny).

On the contrary, the succession of Predicates of Predicates is different in the different Modes of Being. Meantime, it will be proper that in our system of diagrammatization we should provide for the division, whenever needed, of each of our three Universes of modes of reality into Realms for the different Predicaments. (Peirce 1906).

The first thing to extract from this passage is the fact that Peirce's Categories, or "Predicaments", are predicates of predicates. Meaningful predicates have both extension and intension, so predicates of predicates get their meanings from at least two sources of information, namely, the classes of relations and the qualities of qualities to which they refer. Considerations like these tend to generate hierarchies of subject matters, extending through what is traditionally called the logic of second intentions, or what is handled very roughly by second order logic in contemporary parlance, and continuing onward through higher intensions, or higher order logic and type theory.

Peirce arrived at his own system of three categories after a thoroughgoing study of his predecessors, with special reference to the categories of Aristotle, Kant, and Hegel. The names that he used for his own categories varied with context and occasion, ranging from reasonably intuitive terms like quality, reaction, and representation to maximally abstract terms like firstness, secondness, and thirdness, respectively. Taken in full generality, nth-ness can be understood as referring to those properties that all n-adic relations have in common. Peirce's distinctive claim is that a type hierarchy of three levels is generative of all that we need in logic.

Part of the justification for Peirce's claim that three categories are both necessary and sufficient appears to arise from mathematical ideas about the reducibility of n-adic relations. According to Peirce's Reduction Thesis, (a) triads are necessary because genuinely triadic relations cannot be completely analyzed in terms of monadic and dyadic predicates, and (b) triads are sufficient because there are no genuinely tetradic or larger polyadic relations—all higher-arity n-adic relations can be analyzed in terms of triadic and lower-arity relations. Others, notably Robert Burch (1991), Joachim Hereth Correia and Reinhard Pöschel (2006), have offered proofs of the Reduction Thesis.

There have been proposals by Donald Mertz, Herbert Schneider, Carl Hausman, and Carl Vaught to augment Peirce's threefolds to fourfolds; and one by Douglas Greenlee to reduce the system of three categories to two.

Peirce introduces his Categories and their theory in "On a New List of Categories" (1867), a work which is cast as a Kantian deduction and is short but dense and difficult to summarize. The following table is compiled from that and later works.

Peirce's categories (technical name: the cenopythagorean categories)
Name	Typical characterizaton	As universe of experience	As quantity	Technical definition	Valence, "adicity"
Firstness	Quality of feeling	Ideas, chance, possibility	Vagueness, "some"	Reference to a ground (a ground is a pure abstraction of a quality)	Essentially monadic (the quale, in the sense of the such, which has the quality)
Secondness	Reaction, resistance, (dyadic) relation	Brute facts, actuality	Singularity, discreteness, "this"	Reference to a correlate (by its relate)	Essentially dyadic (the relate and the correlate)
Thirdness	Representation, mediation	Habits, laws, necessity	Generality, continuity, "all"	Reference to an interpretant*	Essentially triadic (sign, object, interpretant*)

*Note: An interpretant is an interpretation (human or otherwise) in the sense of the product of an interpretive process. (The context for interpretants is not psychology or sociology, but instead philosophical logic. In a sense, an interpretant is whatever can be understood as a conclusion of an inference. The context for the categories as categories is phenomenology, which Peirce also called phaneroscopy and categorics.)

== See also ==
- Trikonic

== Bibliography ==
- Peirce, C.S. (1867), "On a New List of Categories", Proceedings of the American Academy of Arts and Sciences 7 (1868), 287–298. Presented, 14 May 1867. Reprinted (Collected Papers, vol. 1, paragraphs 545–559), (The Essential Peirce, vol. 1, pp. 1–10), (Chronological Edition, vol. 2, pp. 49–59), Eprint..
- Peirce, C.S. (1885), "One, Two, Three: Fundamental Categories of Thought and of Nature", Manuscript 901; the Collected Papers, vol. 1, paragraphs 369-372 and 376-378 parts; the Chronological Edition, vol. 5, 242-247.
- Peirce, C.S. (1887–1888), "A Guess at the Riddle", Manuscript 909; The Essential Peirce, vol. 1, pp. 245–279; Eprint..
- Peirce, C.S. (1888), "Trichotomic", The Essential Peirce, vol. 1, p. 180.
- Peirce, C.S. (1893), "The Categories", Manuscript 403 "Eprint" (PDF). Archived from the original (PDF) on 2007-09-28. (177 KiB) An incomplete rewrite by Peirce of his 1867 paper "On a New List of Categories". Interleaved by Joseph Ransdell (ed.) with the 1867 paper itself for purposes of comparison.
- Peirce, C.S., (c. 1896), "The Logic of Mathematics; An Attempt to Develop My Categories from Within", the Collected Papers, vol. 1, paragraphs 417–519. Eprint.
- Peirce, C.S., "Phenomenology" (editors' title for collection of articles), The Collected Papers, vol. 1, paragraphs 284-572 Eprint.
- Peirce, C.S. (1903), "The Categories Defended", the third Harvard Lecture: The Harvard Lectures pp. 167–188; the Essential Peirce, vol. 1, pp. 160–178; and partly in the Collected Papers, vol. 5, paragraphs 66-81 and 88–92.
- Charles Sanders Peirce bibliography.
