= Pragmatic theory of information =

The pragmatic theory of information is derived from Charles Sanders Peirce's general theory of signs and inquiry. Peirce explored a number of ideas about information throughout his career. One set of ideas is about the "laws of information" having to do with the logical properties of information. Another set of ideas about "time and thought" have to do with the dynamic properties of inquiry. All of these ideas contribute to the pragmatic theory of inquiry. Peirce set forth many of these ideas very early in his career, periodically returning to them on scattered occasions until the end, and they appear to be implicit in much of his later work on the logic of science and the theory of signs, but he never developed their implications to the fullest extent. The 20th century thinker Ernst Ulrich and his wife Christine von Weizsäcker reviewed the pragmatics of information; their work is reviewed by Gennert.

== Overview ==
The pragmatic information content is the information content received by a recipient; it is focused on the recipient and defined in contrast to Claude Shannon's information definition, which focuses on the message. The pragmatic information measures the information received, not the information contained in the message. Pragmatic information theory requires not only a model of the sender and how it encodes information, but also a model of the receiver and how it acts on the information received. The determination of pragmatic information content is a precondition for the determination of the value of information.

Claude Shannon and Warren Weaver completed the viewpoint on information encoding in the seminal paper by Shannon A Mathematical Theory of Communication, with two additional viewpoints (B and C):

- A. How accurately can the symbols that encode the message be transmitted ("the technical problem")?
- B. How precisely do the transmitted symbols convey the desired meaning("the semantics problem")?
- C. How effective is the received message in changing conduct ("the effectiveness problem")?

Pragmatics of communication is the observable effect a communication act (here receiving a message) has on the actions of the recipient. The pragmatic information content of a message may be different for different recipients or the same message may have the same content. Weizsäcker used the concept of novelty and irrelevance to separate information which is pragmatically useful or not. Algebraically, the pragmatic information content must satisfy three rules:

- EQ: Two messages are equivalent when they lead to the same actions.
- SAME: Equivalent messages of different size can have the same pragmatic information content.
- DIFF: The same message has different pragmatic information content when used in different decision contexts.

More recently, Weinberger formulated a quantitative theory of pragmatic information. In contrast to standard information theory that says nothing about the semantic content of information, Weinberger's theory attempts to measure the amount of information actually used in making a decision. Included in Weinberger's paper is a demonstration that his version of pragmatic information increases over the course of time in a simple model of evolution known as the quasispecies model. This is demonstrably not true for the standard measure of information.

The acquisition of the information and the use of it in decision making can be separated. The use of acquired information to make a decision is, in the general case, an optimization in an uncertain situation (which is included in Weinberger's theory). For deterministc rule based decisions, the agent can be formalized as an algebra with a set of operations and the state changes when these operations are executed (no optimization applied). The pragmatic information such an agent picks up from a messages is the transformation of the tokens in the message into operations the recipient is capable of.

== Measuring the pragmatic information content with an agent-model of the receiver ==
Frank used agent-based models and the theory of autonomous agents with cognitive abilities (see multi-agent system) to operationalize measuring pragmatic information content. The transformation between the received message and the executed message is defined by the agents rules; the pragmatic information content is the information in the transformed message, measured by the methods given by Shannon. The general case can be split in (deterministic) actions to change the information the agent already has and the optimal decision using this information. To measure the pragmatic information content is relevant to assess the value of information received by an agent and influences the agents willingness to pay for information - not measured by Shannon communication information content, but by the received pragmatic information content.

The rules for the transformation of a received message to the pragmatic content drop information already available;

(1) information already known is ignored and

(2) elaborated messages can be reduced to the agents action, reducing the information content when the receiver understands and can execute actions more powerful than the encoding calls for.

The transformation achieves the three rules mentioned above (EQ, SAME, DIFF).

The action of the agent can be taken as just 'updating its knowledge store" and the actual decision by the agent, optimizing the result, is modeled separately, as, for example, done in Weinberger's approach.

== Example: car navigation ==
A familiar application may clarify the approach: Different car navigation systems produce different instructions but if they manage to guide you to the same location, their pragmatic information content must be the same (despite different information content when measured with Shannon's measure (SAME). A novice in the area may need all instructions received - the pragmatic information content and the (minimally encoded) information content of the message is the same. An experienced driver will ignore all "follow the road" and "go straight" instructions, thus the pragmatic information content is lower; for a driver with knowledge of the area, large parts of the instructions may be subsumed by simple instructions "drive to X"; typically, only the last part ("the last mile") of the instructions are meaningful - the pragmatic information content is smaller, because much knowledge is already available (DIFF). Messages with more or less verbiage have for this user the same pragmatic content (SAME).

== See also ==
- Information theory
- Pragmatic maxim
- Pragmatic theory of truth
- Pragmaticism
- Pragmatism
- Scientific method
- Semiosis
- Semiotics
- Semiotic theory of Charles Sanders Peirce
- Semiotic information theory
- Sign relation
- Ternary relation
