= Semiotic theory of Charles Sanders Peirce =

Charles Sanders Peirce began writing on semiotics, which he also called semeiotics, meaning the philosophical study of signs, in the 1860s, around the time that he devised his system of three categories. During the 20th century, the term "semiotics" was adopted to cover all tendencies of sign researches, including Ferdinand de Saussure's semiology, which began in linguistics as a completely separate tradition.

Peirce adopted the term semiosis (or semeiosis) and defined it to mean an "action, or influence, which is, or involves, a cooperation of three subjects, such as a sign, its object, and its interpretant, this trirelative influence not being in any way resolvable into actions between pairs." This specific type of triadic relation is fundamental to Peirce's understanding of philosophical logic as formal semiotic. He eventually divided (philosophical) logic, or formal semiotics, into (1) speculative grammar, or stechiology on the elements of semiosis (sign, object, interpretant), how signs can signify and, in relation to that, what kinds of signs, objects, and interpretants there are, how signs combine, and how some signs embody or incorporate others; (2) logical critic, or logic proper, on the modes of inference; and (3) speculative rhetoric, or methodeutic, the philosophical theory of inquiry, including his form of pragmatism.

His speculative grammar, or stechiology, is this article's subject.

Peirce conceives of and discusses things like representations, interpretations, and assertions broadly and in terms of philosophical logic, rather than in terms of psychology, linguistics, or social studies. He places philosophy at a level of generality between mathematics and the special sciences of nature and mind, such that it draws principles from mathematics and supplies principles to special sciences. On the one hand, his semiotic theory does not resort to special experiences or special experiments in order to settle its questions. On the other hand, he draws continually on examples from common experience, and his semiotics is not contained in a mathematical or deductive system and does not proceed chiefly by drawing necessary conclusions about purely hypothetical objects or cases. As philosophical logic, it is about the drawing of conclusions deductive, inductive, or hypothetically explanatory. Peirce's semiotics, in its classifications, its critical analysis of kinds of inference, and its theory of inquiry, is philosophical logic studied in terms of signs and their triadic relations as positive phenomena in general.

Peirce's semiotic theory is different from Saussure's conceptualization in the sense that it rejects his dualist view of the Cartesian self. He believed that semiotics is a unifying and synthesizing discipline. More importantly, he included the element of "interpretant" into the fundamental understanding of the sign.

== Semiotic elements ==
Here is Peirce's definition of the triadic sign relation that formed the core of his definition of logic:

Namely, a sign is something, A, which brings something, B, its interpretant sign determined or created by it, into the same sort of correspondence with something, C, its object, as that in which itself stands to C. (Peirce 1902, NEM 4, 20–21).

This definition, together with Peirce's definitions of correspondence and determination, is sufficient to derive all of the statements that are necessarily true for all sign relations. Yet, there is much more to the theory of signs than simply proving universal theorems about generic sign relations. There is also the task of classifying the various species and subspecies of sign relations. As a practical matter, of course, familiarity with the full range of concrete examples is indispensable to theory and application both.

In Peirce's theory of signs, a sign is something that stands in a well-defined kind of relation to two other things, its object and its interpretant sign. Although Peirce's definition of a sign is independent of psychological subject matter and his theory of signs covers more ground than linguistics alone, it is nevertheless the case that many of the more familiar examples and illustrations of sign relations will naturally be drawn from linguistics and psychology, along with our ordinary experience of their subject matters.

For example, one way to approach the concept of an interpretant is to think of a psycholinguistic process. In this context, an interpretant can be understood as a sign's effect on the mind, or on anything that acts like a mind, what Peirce calls a quasi-mind. An interpretant is a process of interpretation, one of the types of activity that falls under the heading of semiosis. One usually says that a sign stands for an object to an agent, an interpreter. In the upshot, however, it is the sign's effect on the agent that is paramount. This effect is what Peirce called the interpretant sign, or the interpretant for short. An interpretant in its barest form is a sign's meaning, implication, or ramification, and especial interest attaches to the types of semiosis that proceed from obscure signs to relatively clear interpretants. In logic and mathematics the most clarified and most succinct signs for an object are called canonical forms or normal forms. The interpretant, in Peirce's conceptualization, is not the user of the sign but the "proper significate effect" or that mental concept produced by both the sign and by the user's experience of the object.

Peirce argued that logic is the formal study of signs in the broadest sense, not only signs that are artificial, linguistic, or symbolic, but also signs that are semblances or are indexical such as reactions. Peirce held that "all this universe is perfused with signs, if it is not composed exclusively of signs", along with their representational and inferential relations. He argued that, since all thought takes time, all thought is in signs:

To say, therefore, that thought cannot happen in an instant, but requires a time, is but another way of saying that every thought must be interpreted in another, or that all thought is in signs. (Peirce, 1868)

Thought is not necessarily connected with a brain. It appears in the work of bees, of crystals, and throughout the purely physical world; and one can no more deny that it is really there, than that the colors, the shapes, etc., of objects are really there. Consistently adhere to that unwarrantable denial, and you will be driven to some form of idealistic nominalism akin to Fichte's. Not only is thought in the organic world, but it develops there. But as there cannot be a General without Instances embodying it, so there cannot be thought without Signs. We must here give "Sign" a very wide sense, no doubt, but not too wide a sense to come within our definition. Admitting that connected Signs must have a Quasi-mind, it may further be declared that there can be no isolated sign. Moreover, signs require at least two Quasi-minds; a Quasi-utterer and a Quasi-interpreter; and although these two are at one (i.e., are one mind) in the sign itself, they must nevertheless be distinct. In the Sign they are, so to say, welded. Accordingly, it is not merely a fact of human Psychology, but a necessity of Logic, that every logical evolution of thought should be dialogic. (Peirce, 1906)

=== Sign relation ===
Signhood is a way of being in relation, not a way of being in itself. Anything is a sign—not as itself, but in some relation to another. The role of sign is constituted as one role among three: object, sign, and interpretant sign. It is an irreducible triadic relation; the roles are distinct even when the things that fill them are not. The roles are but three: a sign of an object leads to interpretants, which, as signs, lead to further interpretants. In various relations, the same thing may be sign or semiotic object. The question of what a sign is depends on the concept of a sign relation, which depends on the concept of a triadic relation. This, in turn, depends on the concept of a relation itself. Peirce depended on mathematical ideas about the reducibility of relations—dyadic, triadic, tetradic, and so forth. According to Peirce's Reduction Thesis, (a) triads are necessary because genuinely triadic relations cannot be completely analyzed in terms of monadic and dyadic predicates, and (b) triads are sufficient because there are no genuinely tetradic or larger polyadic relations—all higher-arity n-adic relations can be analyzed in terms of triadic and lower-arity relations and are reducible to them. Peirce and others, notably Robert W. Burch (1991) and Joachim Hereth Correia and Reinhard Pöschel (2006), have offered proofs of the Reduction Thesis. According to Peirce, a genuinely monadic predicate characteristically expresses quality. A genuinely dyadic predicate—reaction or resistance. A genuinely triadic predicate—representation or mediation. Thus Peirce's theory of relations underpins his philosophical theory of three basic categories (see below).

Extension × intension = information. Two traditional approaches to sign relation, necessary though insufficient, are the way of extension (a sign's objects, also called breadth, denotation, or application) and the way of intension (the objects' characteristics, qualities, attributes referenced by the sign, also called depth, comprehension, significance, or connotation). Peirce adds a third, the way of information, including change of information, in order to integrate the other two approaches into a unified whole. For example, because of the equation above, if a term's total amount of information stays the same, then the more that the term 'intends' or signifies about objects, the fewer are the objects to which the term 'extends' or applies. A proposition's comprehension consists in its implications.

Determination. A sign depends on its object in such a way as to represent its object—the object enables and, in a sense, determines the sign. A physically causal sense of this stands out especially when a sign consists in an indicative reaction. The interpretant depends likewise on both the sign and the object—the object determines the sign to determine the interpretant. But this determination is not a succession of dyadic events, like a row of toppling dominoes; sign determination is triadic. For example, an interpretant does not merely represent something which represented an object; instead an interpretant represents something as a sign representing an object. It is an informational kind of determination, a rendering of something more determinately representative. Peirce used the word "determine" not in strictly deterministic sense, but in a sense of "specializes", bestimmt, involving variation in measure, like an influence. Peirce came to define sign, object, and interpretant by their (triadic) mode of determination, not by the idea of representation, since that is part of what is being defined. The object determines the sign to determine another sign—the interpretant—to be related to the object as the sign is related to the object, hence the interpretant, fulfilling its function as sign of the object, determines a further interpretant sign. The process is logically structured to perpetuate itself, and is definitive of sign, object, and interpretant in general. In semiosis, every sign is an interpretant in a chain stretching both fore and aft. The relation of informational or logical determination which constrains object, sign, and interpretant is more general than the special cases of causal or physical determination. In general terms, any information about one of the items in the sign relation tells you something about the others, although the actual amount of this information may be nil in some species of sign relations.

=== Sign, object, interpretant ===
Peirce held that there are exactly three basic semiotic elements, the sign, object, and interpretant, as outlined above and fleshed out here in a bit more detail:

- A sign (or representamen) represents, in the broadest possible sense of "represents". It is something interpretable as saying something about something. It is not necessarily symbolic, linguistic, or artificial.
- An object (or semiotic object) is a subject matter of a sign and an interpretant. It can be anything discussable or thinkable, a thing, event, relationship, quality, law, argument, etc., and can even be fictional, for instance Hamlet. All of those are special or partial objects. The object most accurately is the universe of discourse to which the partial or special object belongs. For instance, a perturbation of Pluto's orbit is a sign about Pluto but ultimately not only about Pluto.
- An interpretant (or interpretant sign) is the sign's more or less clarified meaning or ramification, a kind of form or idea of the difference which the sign's being true or undeceptive would make. (Peirce's sign theory concerns meaning in the broadest sense, including logical implication, not just the meanings of words as properly clarified by a dictionary.) The interpretant is a sign (a) of the object and (b) of the interpretant's "predecessor" (the interpreted sign) as being a sign of the same object. The interpretant is an interpretation in the sense of a product of an interpretive process or a content in which an interpretive relation culminates, though this product or content may itself be an act, a state of agitation, a conduct, etc. Such is what is summed up in saying that the sign stands for the object to the interpretant.

Some of the understanding needed by the mind depends on familiarity with the object. In order to know what a given sign denotes, the mind needs some experience of that sign's object collaterally to that sign or sign system, and in this context Peirce speaks of collateral experience, collateral observation, collateral acquaintance, all in much the same terms.

"Representamen" (properly with the "a" long and stressed: /rɛprɪzɛnˈteɪmən/) was adopted (not coined) by Peirce as his blanket technical term for any and every sign or sign-like thing covered by his theory. It is a question of whether the theoretically defined "representamen" covers only the cases covered by the popular word "sign." The word "representamen" is there in case a divergence should emerge. Peirce's example was this: Sign action always involves a mind. If a sunflower, by doing nothing more than turning toward the sun, were thereby to become fully able to reproduce a sunflower turning in just the same way toward the sun, then the first sunflower's turning would be a representamen of the sun yet not a sign of the sun. Peirce eventually stopped using the word "representamen."

Peirce made various classifications of his semiotic elements, especially of the sign and the interpretant. Of particular concern in understanding the sign-object-interpretant triad is this: In relation to a sign, its object and its interpretant are either immediate (present in the sign) or mediate.

1. Sign, always immediate to itself—that is, in a tautologous sense, present in or at itself, even if it is not immediate to a mind or immediately accomplished without processing or is a general apprehended only in its instances.
2. Object
  1. Immediate object, the object as represented in the sign.
  2. Dynamic object, the object as it really is, on which the idea which is the immediate object is "founded, as on bedrock." Also called the dynamoid object, the dynamical object.
3. Interpretant
  1. Immediate interpretant, the quality of the impression which a sign is fit to produce, not any actual reaction, and which the sign carries with it even before there is an interpreter or quasi-interpreter. It is what is ordinarily called the sign's meaning.
  2. Dynamic interpretant, the actual effect (apart from the feeling) of the sign on a mind or quasi-mind, for instance the agitation of the feeling.
  3. Final interpretant, the effect which the sign would have on the conduct of any mind or quasi-mind if circumstances allowed that effect to be fully achieved. It is the sign's end or purpose. The final interpretant of one's inquiry about the weather is the inquiry's purpose, the effect which the response would have on the plans for the day of anybody in one's shoes. The final interpretant of a line of investigation as such is the truth as the ideal final opinion and would be reached sooner or later but still inevitably by investigation adequately prolonged, though the truth remains independent of that which you or I or any finite community of investigators believe.

The immediate object is, from the viewpoint of a theorist, really a kind of sign of the dynamic object; but phenomenologically it is the object until there is reason to go beyond it, and somebody analyzing (critically but not theoretically) a given semiosis will consider the immediate object to be the object until there is reason to do otherwise.

Peirce preferred phrases like dynamic object over real object since the object might be fictive—Hamlet, for instance, to whom one grants a fictive reality, a reality within the universe of discourse of the play Hamlet.

It is initially tempting to regard immediate, dynamic, and final interpretants as forming a temporal succession in an actual process of semiosis, especially since their conceptions refer to beginning, midstages, and end of a semiotic process. But instead their distinctions from each other are modal or categorial. The immediate interpretant is a quality of impression which a sign is fitted to produce, a special potentiality. The dynamic interpretant is an actuality. The final interpretant is a kind of norm or necessity unaffected by actual trends of opinion or interpretation. One does not actually obtain a final interpretant per se; instead one may successfully coincide with it. Peirce, a fallibilist, holds that one has no guarantees that one has done so, but only compelling reasons, sometimes very compelling, to think so and, in practical matters, must sometimes act with complete confidence of having done so. (Peirce said that it is often better in practical matters to rely on instinct, sentiment, and tradition, than on theoretical inquiry.) In any case, insofar as truth is the final interpretant of a pursuit of truth, one believes, in effect, that one coincides with a final interpretant of some question about what is true, whenever and to whatever extent that one believes that one reaches a truth.

== Classes of signs ==
Peirce proposes several typologies and definitions of the signs. At least 76 definitions of what a sign is have been collected throughout Peirce's work. Some canonical typologies can nonetheless be observed, one crucial one being the distinction between "icons", "indices" and "symbols" (CP 2.228, CP 2.229 and CP 5.473). The icon-index-symbol typology is chronologically the first but structurally the second of three that fit together as a trio of three-valued parameters in regular scheme of nine kinds of sign. (The three "parameters" (not Peirce's term) are not independent of one another, and the result is a system of ten classes of sign, which are shown further down in this article.)

Peirce's three basic phenomenological categories come into central play in these classifications. The 1-2-3 numerations used further below in the exposition of sign classes represents Peirce's associations of sign classes with the categories. The categories are as follows:

Peirce's categories (technical name: the cenopythagorean categories)
Name	Typical characterizaton	As universe of experience	As quantity	Technical definition	Valence, "adicity"
Firstness	Quality of feeling	Ideas, chance, possibility	Vagueness, "some"	Reference to a ground (a ground is a pure abstraction of a quality)	Essentially monadic (the quale, in the sense of the such, which has the quality)
Secondness	Reaction, resistance, (dyadic) relation	Brute facts, actuality	Singularity, discreteness, "this"	Reference to a correlate (by its relate)	Essentially dyadic (the relate and the correlate)
Thirdness	Representation, mediation	Habits, laws, necessity	Generality, continuity, "all"	Reference to an interpretant*	Essentially triadic (sign, object, interpretant*)

*Note: An interpretant is an interpretation (human or otherwise) in the sense of the product of an interpretive process.

The three sign typologies depend respectively on (I) the sign itself, (II) how the sign stands for its denoted object, and (III) how the signs stands for its object to its interpretant. Each of the three typologies is a three-way division, a trichotomy, via Peirce's three phenomenological categories.

1. Qualisigns, sinsigns, and legisigns. Every sign is either (qualisign) a quality or possibility, or (sinsign) an actual individual thing, fact, event, state, etc., or (legisign) a norm, habit, rule, law. (Also called tones, tokens, and types, also potisigns, actisigns, and famisigns.)
2. Icons, indices, and symbols. Every sign refers either (icon) through similarity to its object, or (index) through factual connection to its object, or (symbol) through interpretive habit or norm of reference to its object.
3. Rhemes, dicisigns, and arguments. Every sign is interpreted either as (rheme) term-like, standing for its object in respect of quality, or as (dicisign) proposition-like, standing for its object in respect of fact, or as (argument) argumentative, standing for its object in respect of habit or law. This is the trichotomy of all signs as building blocks of inference. (Also called sumisigns, dicent signs, and suadisigns, also semes, phemes, and delomes.)

Every sign falls under one class or another within (I) and within (II) and within (III). Thus each of the three typologies is a three-valued parameter for every sign. The three parameters are not independent of each other; many co-classifications are not found. The result is not 27 but instead ten classes of signs fully specified at this level of analysis.

In later years, Peirce attempted a finer level of analysis, defining sign classes in terms of relations not just to sign, object, and interpretant, but to sign, immediate object, dynamic object, immediate interpretant, dynamic interpretant, and final or normal interpretant. He aimed at 10 trichotomies of signs, with the above three trichotomies interspersed among them, and issuing in 66 classes of signs. He did not bring that system into a finished form. In any case, in that system, icon, index, and symbol were classed by category of how they stood for the dynamic object, while rheme, dicisign, and argument were classed by the category of how they stood to the final or normal interpretant.

These conceptions are specific to Peirce's theory of signs and are not exactly equivalent to general uses of the notions of "icon", "index", "symbol", "tone", "token", "type", "term" (or "rheme"), "proposition" (or "pheme"), "argument".

=== I. Qualisign, sinsign, legisign ===
Also called tone, token, type; and also called potisign, actisign, famisign.

This is the typology of the sign as distinguished by sign's own phenomenological category (set forth in 1903, 1904, etc.).

1. A qualisign (also called tone, potisign, and mark) is a sign which consists in a quality of feeling, a possibility, a "First".
2. A sinsign (also called token and actisign) is a sign which consists in a reaction/resistance, an actual singular thing, an actual occurrence or fact, a "Second".
3. A legisign (also called type and famisign) is a sign which consists in a (general) idea, a norm or law or habit, a representational relation, a "Third".

A replica (also called instance) of a legisign is a sign, often an actual individual one (a sinsign), which embodies that legisign. A replica is a sign for the associated legisign, and therefore is also a sign for the legisign's object. All legisigns need sinsigns as replicas, for expression. Some but not all legisigns are symbols. All symbols are legisigns. Different words with the same meaning are symbols which are replicas of that symbol which consists in their meaning but doesn't prescribe qualities of its replicas. The replica of a rhematic symbol, for instance, calls up a mental image which image, owing to the habits and dispositions of such mind, often produce a general concept. Here, the replica is interpreted as a sign of the object, which is then considered an instance of that concept.

=== II. Icon, index, symbol ===
This is the typology of the sign as distinguished by phenomenological category of its way of denoting the object (set forth in 1867 and many times in later years). This typology emphasizes the different ways in which the sign refers to its object—the icon by a quality of its own, the index by real connection to its object, and the symbol by a habit or rule for its interpretant. The modes may be compounded, for instance, in a sign that displays a forking line iconically for a fork in the road and stands indicatively near a fork in the road.

1. An icon (also called likeness and semblance) is a sign that denotes its object by virtue of a quality which is shared by them but which the icon has irrespectively of the object. The icon (for instance, a portrait or a diagram) resembles or imitates its object. The icon has, of itself, a certain character or aspect, one which the object also has (or is supposed to have) and which lets the icon be interpreted as a sign even if the object does not exist. The icon signifies essentially on the basis of its "ground." (Peirce defined the ground as the pure abstraction of a quality, and the sign's ground as the pure abstraction of the quality in respect of which the sign refers to its object, whether by resemblance or, as a symbol, by imputing the quality to the object.) For Peirce, to be iconic denotes that some semblance obtains between the signs of the system and aspects of its object. This is part of his diagrammatic logic where the iconic system is scribed (i.e. partly written and partly drawn). Peirce called an icon apart from a label, legend, or other index attached to it, a "hypoicon", and divided the hypoicon into three classes: (a) the image, which depends on a simple quality; (b) the diagram, whose internal relations, mainly dyadic or so taken, represent by analogy the relations in something; and (c) the metaphor, which represents the representative character of a sign by representing a parallelism in something else. A diagram can be geometric, or can consist in an array of algebraic expressions, or even in the common form "All __ is __." which is subjectable, like any diagram, to logical or mathematical transformations. Peirce held that mathematics is done by diagrammatic thinking—observation of, and experimentation on, diagrams.
2. An index* is a sign that denotes its object by virtue of an actual connection involving them, one that he also calls a real relation in virtue of its being irrespective of interpretation. It is in any case a relation which is in fact, in contrast to the icon, which has only a ground for denotation of its object, and in contrast to the symbol, which denotes by an interpretive habit or law. An index which compels attention without conveying any information about its object is a pure index, though that may be an ideal limit never actually reached. If an indexical relation is a resistance or reaction physically or causally connecting an index to its object, then the index is a reagent (for example smoke coming from a building is a reagent index of fire). Such an index is really affected or modified by the object, and is the only kind of index which can be used in order to ascertain facts about its object. Peirce also usually held that an index does not have to be an actual individual fact or thing, but can be general; a disease symptom is general, its occurrence singular; and he usually considered a designation to be an index, e.g., a pronoun, a proper name, a label on a diagram, etc. (In 1903 Peirce said that only an individual is an index, gave "seme" as an alternate expression for "index", and called designations "subindices or hyposemes, which were a kind of symbol; he allowed of a "degenerate index" indicating a non-individual object, as exemplified by an individual thing indicating its own characteristics. But by 1904 he allowed indices to be generals and returned to classing designations as indices. In 1906 he changed the meaning of "seme" to that of the earlier "sumisign" and "rheme".)
3. A symbol* is a sign that denotes its object solely by virtue of the fact that it will be interpreted to do so. The symbol consists in a natural or conventional or logical rule, norm, or habit, a habit that lacks (or has shed) dependence on the symbolic sign's having a resemblance or real connection to the denoted object. Thus, a symbol denotes by virtue of its interpretant. Its sign-action (semiosis) is ruled by habit, a more or less systematic set of associations that ensures its interpretation. For Peirce, every symbol is general, and that which we call an actual individual symbol (e.g., on the page) is called by Peirce a replica or instance of the symbol. Symbols, like all other legisigns (also called "types"), need actual, individual replicas for expression. The proposition is an example of a symbol which is irrespective of language and of any form of expression and does not prescribe qualities of its replicas. A word that is symbolic (rather than indexical like "this" or iconic like "whoosh!") is an example of a symbol that prescribes qualities (especially looks or sound) of its replicas. Not every replica is actual and individual. Two word-symbols with the same meaning (such as English "horse" and Spanish caballo) are symbols which are replicas of that symbol which consists in their shared meaning. A book, a theory, a person, each is a complex symbol.

* Note: In "On a New List of Categories" (1867) Peirce gave the unqualified term "sign" as an alternate expression for "index", and gave "general sign" as an alternate expression for "symbol". "Representamen" was his blanket technical term for any and every sign or signlike thing covered by his theory. Peirce soon reserved "sign" to its broadest sense, for index, icon, and symbol alike. He also eventually decided that the symbol is not the only sign which can be called a "general sign" in some sense, and that indices and icons can be generals, generalities, too. The general sign, as such, the generality as a sign, he eventually called, at various times, the "legisign" (1903, 1904), the "type" (1906, 1908), and the "famisign" (1908).

=== III. Rheme, dicisign, argument ===
This is the typology of the sign as distinguished by the phenomenological category which the sign's interpretant attributes to the sign's way of denoting the object (set forth in 1902, 1903, etc.):

1. A rheme (also called sumisign and seme*) is a sign that represents its object in respect of quality and so, in its signified interpretant, is represented as a character or mark, though it actually may be icon, index, or symbol. The rheme* (seme) stands as its object for some purpose. A proposition with the subject places left blank is a rheme; but subject terms by themselves are also rhemes. A proposition, said Peirce, can be considered a zero-place rheme, a zero-place predicate.
2. A dicisign (also called dicent sign and pheme) is a sign that represents its object in respect of actual existence and so, in its signified interpretant, is represented as indexical, though it actually may be either index or symbol. The dicisign separately indicates its object (as subject of the predicate). The dicisign "is intended to have some compulsive effect on the interpreter of it." Peirce had generalized the idea of proposition to where a weathercock, photograph, etc., could be considered propositions (or "dicisigns", as he came to call them). A proposition in the conventional sense is a dicent symbol (also called symbolic dicisign). Assertions are also dicisigns.
3. An argument (also called suadisign and delome) is a sign that represents its object in respect of law or habit and so, in its signified interpretant, is represented as symbolic (and was indeed a symbol in the first place). The argument separately "monstrates" its signified interpretant (the argument's conclusion); an argument stripped of all signs of such monstrative relationship is, or becomes, a dicisign. It represents "a process of change in thoughts or signs, as if to induce this change in the Interpreter" through the interpreter's own self-control. A novel, a work of art, the universe, can be a delome in Peirce's terms.

*Note: In his "Prolegomena to an Apology for Pragmaticism" (The Monist, v. XVI, no. 4, Oct. 1906), Peirce uses the words "seme", "pheme", and "delome" (pp. 506, 507, etc.) for the rheme-dicisign-argument typology, but retains the word "rheme" for the predicate (p. 530) in his system of Existential Graphs. Also note that Peirce once offered "seme" as an alternate expression for "index" in 1903.

=== The three sign typologies together: ten classes of sign ===
The three typologies, labeled "I.", "II.", and "III.", are shown together in the table below. As parameters, they are not independent of one another. As previously said, many co-classifications are not found. The slanting and vertical lines show the options for co-classification of a given sign (and appear in MS 339, August 7, 1904, viewable here at the Lyris Peirce Archive). The result is ten classes of sign.

Words in parentheses in the table are alternate names for the same kinds of signs.

Phenomenological category: Sign is distinguished by phenomenological category of...	1. Quality; of feeling. Possibility. Reference to a ground.	OR	2. Reaction, resistance. Brute fact. Reference to a correlate.	OR	3. Representation, mediation. Habit, law. Reference to an interpretant.
I. ...the SIGN ITSELF:	QUALISIGN (Tone, Potisign)	OR	SINSIGN (Token, Actisign)	OR	LEGISIGN (Type, Famisign)
AND
II. ...the sign's way of denoting its OBJECT:	ICON (Likeness, etc.)	OR	INDEX (Sign*)	OR	SYMBOL (General sign*)
AND
III. ...the sign's way— as represented in the INTERPRETANT— of denoting the sign's object:	RHEME (Sumisign, Seme; e.g., a term)	OR	DICISIGN (Dicent sign, Pheme; e.g., a proposition)	OR	ARGUMENT (Suadisign, Delome)

*Note: As noted above, in "On a New List of Categories" (1867) Peirce gave the unqualified word "sign" as an alternate expression for "index", and gave "general sign" as an alternate expression for "symbol". Peirce soon reserved "sign" to its broadest sense, for index, icon, and symbol alike, and eventually decided that symbols are not the only signs which can be called "general signs" in some sense. See note at end of section "II. Icon, index, symbol" for details.
A term (in the conventional sense) is not just any rheme; it is a kind of rhematic symbol. Likewise a proposition (in the conventional sense) is not just any dicisign, it is a kind of dicent symbol.

Peirce's Ten Classes of Sign (CP 2.254-263, EP 2:294-296, from MS 540 of 1903)
	Sign classified by own phenome- nological category	Relative to object	Relative to interpretant	Specificational redundancies in parentheses	Some examples
(I)	Qualisign	Icon	Rheme	(Rhematic Iconic) Qualisign	A feeling of "red"
(II)	Sinsign	Icon	Rheme	(Rhematic) Iconic Sinsign	An individual diagram
(III)	Sinsign	Index	Rheme	Rhematic Indexical Sinsign	A spontaneous cry
(IV)	Sinsign	Index	Dicisign	Dicent (Indexical) Sinsign	A weathercock or photograph
(V)	Legisign	Icon	Rheme	(Rhematic) Iconic Legisign	A diagram, apart from its factual individuality
(VI)	Legisign	Index	Rheme	Rhematic Indexical Legisign	A demonstrative pronoun
(VII)	Legisign	Index	Dicisign	Dicent Indexical Legisign	A street cry (identifying the individual by tone, theme)
(VIII)	Legisign	Symbol	Rheme	Rhematic Symbol (–ic Legisign)	A common noun
(IX)	Legisign	Symbol	Dicisign	Dicent Symbol (–ic Legisign)	A proposition (in the conventional sense)
(X)	Legisign	Symbol	Argument	Argument (–ative Symbolic Legisign)	A syllogism

Peirce's triangular arrangement from MS 540:17 Boldface is Peirce's own and indicates non-redundant specifications. Any two adjacent cells have two aspects in common except in three cases where there is only one aspect in common (II & VI; VI & IX; and III & VII); there the border between the adjacent cells appears extra thick. (The Roman numerals appear on the manuscript but were added by an editor.)
(I); Rhematic; Iconic; **Qualisign**	(V); Rhematic; **Iconic**; **Legisign**	(VIII); **Rhematic**; **Symbol**; Legisign	(X); **Argument**; Symbol; Legisign
	(II); Rhematic; **Iconic**; **Sinsign**	(VI); **Rhematic**; **Indexical**; **Legisign**	(IX); **Dicent**; **Symbol**; Legisign
	(III); **Rhematic**; **Indexical**; **Sinsign**	(VII); **Dicent**; **Indexical**; **Legisign**
		(IV); **Dicent**; Indexical; **Sinsign**

== Influence ==
In the study of photography and film studies Peirce's work is widely cited. He has also been influential in the field of art history.
