= Logic of information =

The logic of information, or the logical theory of information, considers the information content of logical signs and expressions along the lines initially developed by Charles Sanders Peirce. In this line of work, the concept of information serves to integrate the aspects of signs and expressions that are separately covered, on the one hand, by the concepts of denotation and extension, and on the other hand, by the concepts of connotation and comprehension.

Peirce began to develop these ideas in his lectures "On the Logic of Science" at Harvard University (1865) and the Lowell Institute (1866).

== See also ==
- Charles Sanders Peirce bibliography
- Information theory
- Inquiry
- Philosophy of information
- Pragmatic maxim
- Pragmatic theory of information
- Pragmatic theory of truth
- Pragmaticism
- Pragmatism
- Scientific method
- Semeiotic
- Semiosis
- Semiotics
- Semiotic information theory
- Sign relation
- Triadic relation
