= Pragmatic theory of truth =

Theory of truth within pragmatism

A pragmatic theory of truth is a theory of truth within the philosophies of pragmatism and pragmaticism. Pragmatic theories of truth were first posited by Charles Sanders Peirce, William James, and John Dewey. The common features of these theories are a reliance on the pragmatic maxim as a means of clarifying the meanings of difficult concepts such as truth; and an emphasis on the fact that belief, certainty, knowledge, or truth is the result of an inquiry.

== Background ==
Pragmatic theories of truth developed from the earlier ideas of ancient philosophy, the Scholastics. Pragmatic ideas about truth are often confused with the quite distinct notions of "logic and inquiry", "judging what is true", and "truth predicates".

=== Logic and inquiry ===
In one classical formulation, truth is defined as the good of logic, where logic is a normative science, that is, an inquiry into a good or a value that seeks knowledge of it and the means to achieve it. In this view, truth cannot be discussed to much effect outside the context of inquiry, knowledge, and logic, all very broadly considered.

Most inquiries into the character of truth begin with a notion of an informative, meaningful, or significant element, the truth of whose information, meaning, or significance may be put into question and needs to be evaluated. Depending on the context, this element might be called an artefact, expression, image, impression, lyric, mark, performance, picture, sentence, sign, string, symbol, text, thought, token, utterance, word, work, and so on. Whatever the case, one has the task of judging whether the bearers of information, meaning, or significance are indeed truth-bearers. This judgment is typically expressed in the form of a specific truth predicate, whose positive application to a sign, or so on, asserts that the sign is true.

=== Truth predicates ===
Theories of truth may be described according to several dimensions of description that affect the character of the predicate "true". The truth predicates that are used in different theories may be classified by the number of things that have to be mentioned in order to assess the truth of a sign, counting the sign itself as the first thing.

In formal logic, this number is called the arity of the predicate. The kinds of truth predicates may then be subdivided according to any number of more specific characters that various theorists recognize as important.

1. A monadic truth predicate is one that applies to its main subject — typically a concrete representation or its abstract content — independently of reference to anything else. In this case one can say that a truthbearer is true in and of itself.
2. A dyadic truth predicate is one that applies to its main subject only in reference to something else, a second subject. Most commonly, the auxiliary subject is either an object, an interpreter, or a language to which the representation bears some relation.
3. A triadic truth predicate is one that applies to its main subject only in reference to a second and a third subject. For example, in a pragmatic theory of truth, one has to specify both the object of the sign, and either its interpreter or another sign called the interpretant before one can say that the sign is true of its object to its interpreting agent or sign.

Several qualifications must be kept in mind with respect to any such radically simple scheme of classification, as real practice seldom presents any pure types, and there are settings in which it is useful to speak of a theory of truth that is "almost" k-adic, or that "would be" k-adic if certain details can be abstracted away and neglected in a particular context of discussion. That said, given the generic division of truth predicates according to their arity, further species can be differentiated within each genus according to a number of more refined features.

The truth predicate of interest in a typical correspondence theory of truth tells of a relation between representations and objective states of affairs, and is therefore expressed, for the most part, by a dyadic predicate. In general terms, one says that a representation is true of an objective situation, more briefly, that a sign is true of an object. The nature of the correspondence may vary from theory to theory in this family. The correspondence can be fairly arbitrary or it can take on the character of an analogy, an icon, or a morphism, whereby a representation is rendered true of its object by the existence of corresponding elements and a similar structure.

== Peirce ==
Very little in Peirce's thought can be understood in its proper light without understanding that he thinks all thoughts are signs, and thus, according to his theory of thought, no thought is understandable outside the context of a sign relation. Sign relations taken collectively are the subject matter of a theory of signs. So Peirce's semiotic, his theory of sign relations, is key to understanding his entire philosophy of pragmatic thinking and thought.

In his contribution to the article "Truth and Falsity and Error" for Baldwin's Dictionary of Philosophy and Psychology (1901), Peirce defines truth in the following way:

Truth is that concordance of an abstract statement with the ideal limit towards which endless investigation would tend to bring scientific belief, which concordance the abstract statement may possess by virtue of the confession of its inaccuracy and one-sidedness, and this confession is an essential ingredient of truth. (Peirce 1901, see Collected Papers (CP) 5.565).

This statement emphasizes Peirce's view that ideas of approximation, incompleteness, and partiality, what he describes elsewhere as fallibilism and "reference to the future", are essential to a proper conception of truth. Although Peirce occasionally uses words like concordance and correspondence to describe one aspect of the pragmatic sign relation, he is also quite explicit in saying that definitions of truth based on mere correspondence are no more than nominal definitions, which he follows long tradition in relegating to a lower status than real definitions.

That truth is the correspondence of a representation with its object is, as Kant says, merely the nominal definition of it. Truth belongs exclusively to propositions. A proposition has a subject (or set of subjects) and a predicate. The subject is a sign; the predicate is a sign; and the proposition is a sign that the predicate is a sign of that of which the subject is a sign. If it be so, it is true. But what does this correspondence or reference of the sign, to its object, consist in? (Peirce 1906, CP 5.553).

Here Peirce makes a statement that is decisive for understanding the relationship between his pragmatic definition of truth and any theory of truth that leaves it solely and simply a matter of representations corresponding with their objects. Peirce, like Kant before him, recognizes Aristotle's distinction between a nominal definition, a definition in name only, and a real definition, one that states the function of the concept, the reason for conceiving it, and so indicates the essence, the underlying substance of its object. This tells us the sense in which Peirce entertained a correspondence theory of truth, namely, a purely nominal sense. To get beneath the superficiality of the nominal definition it is necessary to analyze the notion of correspondence in greater depth.

In preparing for this task, Peirce makes use of an allegorical story, omitted here, the moral of which is that there is no use seeking a conception of truth that we cannot conceive ourselves being able to capture in a humanly conceivable concept. So we might as well proceed on the assumption that we have a real hope of comprehending the answer, of being able to "handle the truth" when the time comes. Bearing that in mind, the problem of defining truth reduces to the following form:

Now thought is of the nature of a sign. In that case, then, if we can find out the right method of thinking and can follow it out — the right method of transforming signs — then truth can be nothing more nor less than the last result to which the following out of this method would ultimately carry us. In that case, that to which the representation should conform, is itself something in the nature of a representation, or sign — something noumenal, intelligible, conceivable, and utterly unlike a thing-in-itself. (Peirce 1906, CP 5.553).

Peirce's theory of truth depends on two other, intimately related subject matters, his theory of sign relations and his theory of inquiry. Inquiry is a special case of semiosis, a process that transforms signs into signs while maintaining a specific relationship to an object, which object may be located outside the trajectory of signs or else be found at the end of it. Inquiry includes all forms of belief revision and logical inference, including scientific method, what Peirce here means by "the right method of transforming signs". A sign-to-sign transaction relating to an object is a transaction that involves three parties, or a relation that involves three roles. This is called a ternary or triadic relation in logic. Consequently, pragmatic theories of truth are largely expressed in terms of triadic truth predicates.

The statement above tells us one more thing: Peirce, having started out in accord with Kant, is here giving notice that he is parting ways with the Kantian idea that the ultimate object of a representation is an unknowable thing-in-itself. Peirce would say that the object is knowable, in fact, it is known in the form of its representation, however imperfectly or partially.

Reality and truth are coordinate concepts in pragmatic thinking, each being defined in relation to the other, and both together as they participate in the time evolution of inquiry. Inquiry is not a disembodied process, nor the occupation of a singular individual, but the common life of an unbounded community.

The real, then, is that which, sooner or later, information and reasoning would finally result in, and which is therefore independent of the vagaries of me and you. Thus, the very origin of the conception of reality shows that this conception essentially involves the notion of a COMMUNITY, without definite limits, and capable of a definite increase of knowledge. (Peirce 1868, CP 5.311).

Different minds may set out with the most antagonistic views, but the progress of investigation carries them by a force outside of themselves to one and the same conclusion. This activity of thought by which we are carried, not where we wish, but to a foreordained goal, is like the operation of destiny. No modification of the point of view taken, no selection of other facts for study, no natural bent of mind even, can enable a man to escape the predestinate opinion. This great law is embodied in the conception of truth and reality. The opinion which is fated to be ultimately agreed to by all who investigate, is what we mean by the truth, and the object represented in this opinion is the real. That is the way I would explain reality. (Peirce 1878, CP 5.407).

== James ==
William James's version of the pragmatic theory is often summarized by his statement that "the 'true' is only the expedient in our way of thinking, just as the 'right' is only the expedient in our way of behaving." By this, James meant that truth is a quality the value of which is confirmed by its effectiveness when applying concepts to actual practice (thus, "pragmatic"). James's pragmatic theory is a synthesis of correspondence theory of truth and coherence theory of truth, with an added dimension. Truth is verifiable to the extent that thoughts and statements correspond with actual things, as well as "hangs together," or coheres, fits as pieces of a puzzle might fit together, and these are in turn verified by the observed results of the application of an idea to actual practice. James said that "all true processes must lead to the face of directly verifying sensible experiences somewhere." He also extended his pragmatic theory well beyond the scope of scientific verifiability, and even into the realm of the mystical: "On pragmatic principles, if the hypothesis of God works satisfactorily in the widest sense of the word, then it is 'true.' "

"Truth, as any dictionary will tell you, is a property of certain of our ideas. It means their 'agreement', as falsity means their disagreement, with 'reality'. Pragmatists and intellectualists both accept this definition as a matter of course. They begin to quarrel only after the question is raised as to what may precisely be meant by the term 'agreement', and what by the term 'reality', when reality is taken as something for our ideas to agree with."

Pragmatism, James clarifies, is not a new philosophy. He states that it instead focuses on discerning truth between contrasting schools of thought. “To understand truth, he argues, we must consider the pragmatic ‘cash-value’ of having true beliefs and the practical difference of having true ideas." By using the term ‘cash-value,’ James refers to the practical consequences that come from discerning the truth behind arguments, through the pragmatic method, that should yield no desirable answer. In such cases, the pragmatic method must “try to interpret each notion by tracing its respective practical consequences." William James uses an analogy of a squirrel on a tree to further explain the pragmatic method.

James imagines a squirrel on a tree. If it clung to one side of the tree, and a person stood on the other, and as the person walked around the tree so too did the squirrel as to never be seen by the person, would the person rightly be walking around the squirrel? “’Depends on what you practically mean by ‘going round’ the squirrel. If you mean passing from the north of him to the east, then to the south, then to the west, then to the north of him again, obviously the man does go round him… but on the contrary if you mean being first in front of him, then behind him, then on his left, then finally in front again, it is quite obvious that the man fails to go round him." In such arguments, where no practical consequences can be found after making a distinction, the argument should be dropped. If, however, the argument was to yield one result which clearly holds greater consequences, then that side should be agreed upon solely for its intrinsic value. Although James never actually clarifies what “practical consequences” are, he does mention how the best way to find division between possible consequences is by first practically defining what each side of the argument means. In terms of James’s example, he says: “You are both right and both wrong according as you conceive the verb ‘to go round’ in one practical fashion or the other." Thus the pragmatic theory seeks to find truth through the division and practical consequences between contrasting sides to establish which side is correct.

William James (1907) begins his chapter on "Pragmatism's Conception of Truth" in much the same letter and spirit as the above selection from Peirce (1906), noting the nominal definition of truth as a plausible point of departure, but immediately observing that the pragmatist's quest for the meaning of truth can only begin, not end there.

"The popular notion is that a true idea must copy its reality. Like other popular views, this one follows the analogy of the most usual experience. Our true ideas of sensible things do indeed copy them. Shut your eyes and think of yonder clock on the wall, and you get just such a true picture or copy of its dial. But your idea of its 'works' (unless you are a clockmaker) is much less of a copy, yet it passes muster, for it in no way clashes with reality. Even though it should shrink to the mere word 'works', that word still serves you truly; and when you speak of the 'time-keeping function' of the clock, or of its spring's 'elasticity', it is hard to see exactly what your ideas can copy."

James exhibits a knack for popular expression that Peirce seldom sought, and here his analysis of correspondence by way of a simple thought experiment cuts right to the quick of the first major question to ask about it, namely: To what extent is the notion of correspondence involved in truth covered by the ideas of analogues, copies, or iconic images of the thing represented? The answer is that the iconic aspect of correspondence can be taken literally only in regard to sensory experiences of the more precisely eidetic sort. When it comes to the kind of correspondence that might be said to exist between a symbol, a word like "works", and its object, the springs and catches of the clock on the wall, then the pragmatist recognizes that a more than nominal account of the matter still has a lot more explaining to do.

=== Making truth ===
Instead of truth being ready-made for us, James asserts we and reality jointly "make" truth. This idea has two senses: (1) truth is mutable, (often attributed to William James and F.C.S. Schiller); and (2) truth is relative to a conceptual scheme (more widely accepted in Pragmatism).

(1) Mutability of truth

"Truth" is not readily defined in Pragmatism. Can beliefs pass from being true to being untrue and back? For James, beliefs are not true until they have been made true by verification. James believed propositions become true over the long term through proving their utility in a person's specific situation. The opposite of this process is not falsification, but rather the belief ceases to be a "live option." F.C.S. Schiller, on the other hand, clearly asserted beliefs could pass into and out of truth on a situational basis. Schiller held that truth was relative to specific problems. If I want to know how to return home safely, the true answer will be whatever is useful to solving that problem. Later on, when faced with a different problem, what I came to believe with the earlier problem may now be false. As my problems change, and as the most useful way to solve a problem shifts, so does the property of truth.

C.S. Peirce considered the idea that beliefs are true at one time but false at another (or true for one person but false for another) to be one of the "seeds of death" by which James allowed his pragmatism to become "infected." For Peirce the pragmatic view implies theoretical claims should be tied to verification processes (i.e. they should be subject to test). They shouldn't be tied to our specific problems or life needs. Truth is defined, for Peirce, as what would be the ultimate outcome (not any outcome in real time) of inquiry by a (usually scientific) community of investigators. William James, while agreeing with this definition, also characterized truthfulness as a species of the good: if something is true it is trustworthy and reliable and will remain so in every conceivable situation. Both Peirce and Dewey connect the definitions of truth and warranted assertability. Hilary Putnam also developed his internal realism around the idea a belief is true if it is ideally justified in epistemic terms. About James' and Schiller's view, Putnam says:

Truth cannot simply be rational acceptability for one fundamental reason; truth is supposed to be a property of a statement that cannot be lost, whereas justification can be lost. The statement 'The earth is flat' was, very likely, rationally acceptable 3000 years ago; but it is not rationally acceptable today. Yet it would be wrong to say that 'the earth is flat' was true 3,000 years ago; for that would mean that the earth has changed its shape. (Putnam 1981, p. 55)

Rorty has also weighed in against James and Schiller:

Truth is, to be sure, an absolute notion, in the following sense: "true for me but not for you" and "true in my culture but not in yours" are weird, pointless locutions. So is "true then, but not now." ... James would, indeed, have done better to say that phrases like "the good in the way of belief" and "what it is better for us to believe" are interchangeable with "justified" rather than with "true." (Rorty 1998, p. 2)

(2) Conceptual relativity

With James and Schiller we make things true by verifying them—a view rejected by most pragmatists. However, nearly all pragmatists do accept the idea there can be no truths without a conceptual scheme to express those truths. That is,

Unless we decide upon how we are going to use concepts like 'object', 'existence' etc., the question 'how many objects exist' does not really make any sense. But once we decide the use of these concepts, the answer to the above-mentioned question within that use or 'version', to put in Nelson Goodman's phrase, is no more a matter of 'convention'. (Maitra 2003 p. 40)

F.C.S. Schiller used the analogy of a chair to make clear what he meant by the phrase that truth is made: just as a carpenter makes a chair out of existing materials and doesn't create it out of nothing, truth is a transformation of our experience—but this doesn't imply reality is something we're free to construct or imagine as we please.

== Dewey ==
John Dewey, less broadly than William James but much more broadly than Charles Peirce, held that inquiry, whether scientific, technical, sociological, philosophical or cultural, is self-corrective over time if openly submitted for testing by a community of inquirers in order to clarify, justify, refine and/or refute proposed truths. In his Logic: The Theory of Inquiry (1938), Dewey gave the following definition of inquiry:

Inquiry is the controlled or directed transformation of an indeterminate situation into one that is so determinate in its constituent distinctions and relations as to convert the elements of the original situation into a unified whole. (Dewey, p. 108).

The index of the same book has exactly one entry under the heading truth, and it refers to the following footnote:

The best definition of truth from the logical standpoint which is known to me is that by Peirce: "The opinion which is fated to be ultimately agreed to by all who investigate is what we mean by the truth, and the object represented in this opinion is the real [CP 5.407]. (Dewey, 343 n).

Dewey says more of what he understands by truth in terms of his preferred concept of warranted assertibility as the end-in-view and conclusion of inquiry (Dewey, 14–15).

== Criticisms ==
Several objections are commonly made to pragmatist account of truth, of either sort.

First, due originally to Bertrand Russell (1907) in a discussion of James's theory, is that pragmatism mixes up the notion of truth with epistemology. Pragmatism describes an indicator or a sign of truth. It really cannot be regarded as a theory of the meaning of the word "true". There's a difference between stating an indicator and giving the meaning. For example, when the streetlights turn on at the end of a day, that's an indicator, a sign, that evening is coming on. It would be an obvious mistake to say that the word "evening" just means "the time that the streetlights turn on". In the same way, while it might be an indicator of truth, that a proposition is part of that perfect science at the ideal limit of inquiry, that just isn't what "true" means.

Russell's objection is that pragmatism mixes up an indicator of truth with the meaning of the predicate 'true'. There is a difference between the two and pragmatism confuses them. In this pragmatism is akin to Berkeley's view that to be is to be perceived, which similarly confuses an indication or proof of that something exists with the meaning of the word 'exists', or with what it is for something to exist.

Other objections to pragmatism include how we define what it means to say a belief "works", or that it is "useful to believe". The vague usage of these terms, first popularized by James, has led to much debate.

A viable, more sophisticated consensus theory of truth, a mixture of Peircean theory with speech-act theory and social theory, is that presented and defended by Jürgen Habermas, which sets out the universal pragmatic conditions of ideal consensus and responds to many objections to earlier versions of a pragmatic, consensus theory of truth. Habermas distinguishes explicitly between factual consensus, i.e. the beliefs that happen to hold in a particular community, and rational consensus, i.e. consensus attained in conditions approximating an "ideal speech situation", in which inquirers or members of a community suspend or bracket prevailing beliefs and engage in rational discourse aimed at truth and governed by the force of the better argument, under conditions in which all participants in discourse have equal opportunities to engage in constative (assertions of fact), normative, and expressive speech acts, and in which discourse is not distorted by the intervention of power or the internalization of systematic blocks to communication.

Recent Peirceans, Cheryl Misak, and Robert B. Talisse have attempted to formulate Peirce's theory of truth in a way that improves on Habermas and provides an epistemological conception of deliberative democracy.
