= Rob Burch =

Rob or Robert Burch may refer to:

- Rob Burch (footballer) (born 1984), English retired football goalkeeper
- Rob Burch (politician) (born 1949), American politician
- Robert Burch (American football) (1886–1967), American football player and coach
- Robert J. Burch (1925–2007), American writer
- Robert R. Burch (born 1949), Canadian philosopher
- Robert W. Burch (born 1943), American philosopher
