= Interpretant =

Interpretant is a subject / sign that refers to the same object as another sign, transitively.

== History ==
The concept of "interpretant" is part of Charles Sanders Peirce's "triadic" theory of the sign. For Peirce, the interpretant is an element that allows taking a representamen for the sign of an object, and is also the "effect" of the process of semeiosis or signification.

Peirce delineates three types of interpretants: the immediate, the dynamical, and the final or normal.

== Immediate, Dynamical and Final ==
The first of his trichotomies is of the Immediate, Dynamical, and Final interpretant.

The first was defined by Peirce as "the Quality of the Impression that a sign is fit to produce, not to any actual reaction" and elsewhere as "the total unanalyzed effect that the Sign is calculated to produce, or naturally might be expected to produce; and I have been accustomed to identify this with the effect the sign first produces or may produce upon a mind, without any reflection upon it." An Immediate interpretant can take a variety of forms "it may be a quality of feeling, more or less vague, or an idea of an effort or experience awaked by the air of previous experience or it may be the idea of a form or anything of a general type".

The second, the Dynamical interpretant. is the "direct effect actually produced by a Sign upon an Interpreter of it". The last, the Final, is "the effect the Sign would produce upon any mind upon which circumstances should permit it to work out its full effect" and not "the way in which any mind does act but in the way in which every mind would act" if "the Sign is sufficiently considered".

== Intentional, Effectual, and Communicational ==
Peirce offers another trichotomy of interpretants which he explains as follows:

There is the Intentional Interpretant, which is a determination of the mind of the utterer; the Effectual Interpretant, which is a determination of the mind of the interpreter; and the Communicational Interpretant, or say the Cominterpretant, which is a determination of that mind into which the minds of utterer and interpreter have to be fused in order that any communication should take place.

== See also ==
- Charles Sanders Peirce
- Charles Sanders Peirce bibliography
- Semiosis
- Semiotics
- Sign
- Sign relation
- Triadic relation
