= Correspondence theory of truth =

Theory that truth means correspondence with reality

In metaphysics and philosophy of language, the correspondence theory of truth states that the truth or falsity of a statement is determined only by how it relates to the world and whether it accurately describes (i.e., corresponds with) that world.

Correspondence theories claim that true beliefs and true statements correspond to the actual state of affairs. This type of theory attempts to posit a relationship between thoughts or statements on one hand, and things or facts on the other.

== History ==
Correspondence theory is a traditional model which goes back at least to some of the ancient Greek philosophers such as Plato and Aristotle. This class of theories holds that the truth or the falsity of a representation is determined solely by how it relates to a reality; that is, by whether it accurately describes that reality. As Aristotle claims in his Metaphysics: "To say that that which is, is not, and that which is not, is, is a falsehood; therefore, to say that which is, is, and that which is not, is not, is true".

A classic example of correspondence theory is the statement by the medieval philosopher and theologian Thomas Aquinas: "Veritas est adaequatio rei et intellectus" ("Truth is the adequation of things and intellect"), which Aquinas attributed to the ninth-century Neoplatonist Isaac Israeli.

Correspondence theory was either explicitly or implicitly embraced by most of the early modern thinkers, including René Descartes, Baruch Spinoza, John Locke, Gottfried Wilhelm Leibniz, David Hume, and Immanuel Kant. (However, Spinoza and Kant have also been [mis]interpreted as defenders of the coherence theory of truth.) Correspondence theory has also been attributed to Thomas Reid.

In late modern philosophy, Friedrich Wilhelm Joseph Schelling espoused the correspondence theory. According to Bhikhu Parekh, Karl Marx also subscribed to a version of the correspondence theory.

In contemporary Continental philosophy, Edmund Husserl defended the correspondence theory. In contemporary analytic philosophy, Bertrand Russell, Ludwig Wittgenstein (at least in his early period), J. L. Austin, and Karl Popper defended the correspondence theory.

== Varieties ==
=== Correspondence as congruence ===
Bertrand Russell and Ludwig Wittgenstein have in different ways suggested that a statement, to be true, must have some kind of structural isomorphism with the state of affairs in the world that makes it true. For example, "A cat is on a mat" is true if, and only if, there is in the world a cat and a mat and the cat is related to the mat by virtue of being on it. If any of the three pieces (the cat, the mat, and the relation between them which correspond respectively to the subject, object, and verb of the statement) is missing, the statement is false. Some sentences pose difficulties for this model, however. As just one example, adjectives such as "counterfeit", "alleged", or "false" do not have the usual simple meaning of restricting the meaning of the noun they modify: a "tall lawyer" is a kind of lawyer, but an "alleged lawyer" may not be.

=== Correspondence as correlation ===
J. L. Austin theorized that there need not be any structural parallelism between a true statement and the state of affairs that makes it true. It is only necessary that the semantics of the language in which the statement is expressed are such as to correlate whole-for-whole the statement with the state of affairs. A false statement, for Austin, is one that is correlated by the language to a state of affairs that does not exist.

== Relation to ontology ==
Historically, most advocates of correspondence theories have been metaphysical realists; that is, they believe that there is a world external to the minds of all humans. This is in contrast to metaphysical idealists who hold that everything that exists, exists as a substantial metaphysical entity independently of the individual thing of which it is predicated, and also to conceptualists who hold that everything that exists is, in the end, just an idea in some mind. However, it is not strictly necessary that a correspondence theory be married to metaphysical realism. It is possible to hold, for example, that the facts of the world determine which statements are true and to also hold that the world (and its facts) is but a collection of ideas in the mind of some supreme being.

== Objections ==
One attack on the theory claims that the correspondence theory succeeds in its appeal to the real world only in so far as the real world is reachable by us.

The direct realist believes that we directly know objects as they are. Such a person can wholeheartedly adopt a correspondence theory of truth.

The rigorous idealist believes that there are no real, mind-independent objects. The correspondence theory appeals to imaginary undefined entities, so it is incoherent.

Other positions hold that we have some type of awareness, perception, etc. of real-world objects which in some way falls short of direct knowledge of them. But such an indirect awareness or perception is itself an idea in one's mind, so that the correspondence theory of truth reduces to a correspondence between ideas about truth and ideas of the world, whereupon it becomes a coherence theory of truth.

=== Vagueness or circularity ===
Either the defender of the correspondence theory of truth offers some accompanying theory of the world, or they do not.

If no theory of the world is offered, the theory may be seen as vague or even unintelligible: truth would then be supposed to be correspondence to some undefined or ineffable world. On the other hand, as soon as the defender of the correspondence theory of truth offers a theory of the world, the defence becomes circular: they would then be operating in some specific ontological or scientific theory, which stands in need of justification. But the only way to support the truth of this world-theory that is allowed by the correspondence theory of truth, is correspondence to the real world.

Another argument (made by Simon Blackburn in his 2018 book On Truth) against the correspondence theory of truth is that the theory implies that all beliefs (or beliefs that something is true) must involve a manual process of fixing a mental belief A, with a careful attending to that belief by examining B (in which B is significantly covered by A, and B is a direct and real fact of the world), and then finally a rigorous comparison between A and B. If A accurately describes B, then A is said to be true. However, many true beliefs (such as believing that 1+1=2) do not involve such a tedious process, lowering the theory's explanatory power for how we may effectively be disposed to giving true beliefs about the world.

== See also ==
- Belief
- Deep image
- Information
- Inquiry
- Knowledge
- Pragmatism
- Pragmaticism
- Pragmatic maxim
- Reproducibility
- Scientific method
- Testability
- Truthmaker
- Verificationism
