= Nicholas Maxwell =

British philosopher (1937–2025)

Nicholas Maxwell (3 July 1937 – 11 January 2025) was a British philosopher.

Maxwell taught philosophy of science at University College London, where he later was an Emeritus Reader. In 2003 he founded Friends of Wisdom. He has published fifteen books. He has published over eighty papers in scientific and philosophical journals on problems that range from consciousness, free will, value, and art to the rationality of science, simplicity, scientific realism, explanation, time and quantum theory. Maxwell died in January 2025, at the age of 87.

== Philosophical contribution ==
Maxwell's work has been devoted to tackling two fundamental interlinked problems:-
Problem 1: How can we understand our human world, embedded as it is within the physical universe, in such a way that justice is done both to the richness, meaning and value of human life on the one hand, and to what modern science tells us about the physical universe on the other hand?
Problem 2: What ought to be the overall aims and methods of science, and of academic inquiry more generally, granted that the basic task is to help humanity achieve what is of value – a more civilised world – by cooperatively rational means (it being assumed that knowledge and understanding can be of value in themselves and form a part of civilised life)?

In connection with Problem 1, Maxwell has put forward a version of the double-aspect theory, according to which experiential and physical features of things both exist.

In connection with Problem 2, Maxwell argues that the problematic aims of science, and of academic inquiry more generally, need much more honest and critical attention than they have received so far.

== Criticism ==
Maxwell's books have been widely reviewed. His work is discussed by twelve scholars in Science and the Pursuit of Wisdom, edited by Leemon McHenry. David Miller and Maxwell had a short exchange about Aim Oriented Empiricism, which was the central thesis of Maxwell's The Comprehensibility of The Universe.

== Publications ==
- 1976, What’s Wrong With Science?, Bran's Head Books, Hayes, Middlesex.
- 1984, From Knowledge to Wisdom: A Revolution in the Aims and Methods of Science, Basil Blackwell, Oxford.
- 1998, The Comprehensibility of the Universe: A New Conception of Science, Oxford University Press, Oxford.
- 2001, The Human World in the Physical Universe: Consciousness, Free Will and Evolution, Rowman and Littlefield, Lanham.
- 2004, Is Science Neurotic?, Imperial College Press, London.
- 2007, From Knowledge to Wisdom: A Revolution for Science and the Humanities, 2nd edition, revised and enlarged, Pentire Press, London.
- 2008, ed., with R. Barnett, Wisdom in the University, Routledge, London.
- 2009, What's Wrong With Science?, 2nd edition, revised with new preface, Pentire Press, London.
- 2009, L. McHenry, ed., Science and the Pursuit of Wisdom: Studies in the Philosophy of Nicholas Maxwell, Ontos Verlag, Frankfurt.
- 2010, Cutting God in Half – And Putting the Pieces Together Again: A New Approach to Philosophy, Pentire Press, London.
- 2014, How Universities Can Help Create a Wiser World: The Urgent Need for an Academic Revolution, Imprint Academic, Exeter.
- 2014, Global Philosophy: What Philosophy Ought to Be, Imprint Academic, Exeter.
- 2016, Two Great Problems of Learning: Science and Civilization, Rounded Globe. Free online.
- 2017, In Praise of Natural Philosophy: A Revolution for Thought and Life McGill-Queen's University Press, Montreal
- 2017, Understanding Scientific Progress: Aim-Oriented Empiricism, Paragon House, St. Paul, MN.
- 2017, Karl Popper, Science and Englightenment, UCL Press, London. [open access book, free to download]
- 2019, Science and Enlightenment: Two Great Problems of Learning, Springer, Cham, Switzerland.
- 2019, The Metaphysics of Science and Aim-Oriented Empiricism: A Revolution for Science and Philosophy, Springer, Cham, Switzerland.
- 2020, Our Fundamental Problem: A Revolutionary Approach to Philosophy, McGill-Queen's University Press, Canada.
- 2021, The World Crisis — And What to Do About It: A Revolution for Thought and Action, World Scientific, Singapore.
