= Robert R. Burch =

Canadian philosopher

Robert Burch
- Born: 1949 (age 76–77)

Education
- Education: University of Toronto (PhD)
- Thesis: Relativism and the Essence of Ontology (1983)
- Doctoral advisor: T. D. Langan

Philosophical work
- Era: 21st-century philosophy
- Region: Western philosophy
- Institutions: University of Alberta

Robert Raynor Burch is a Canadian philosopher and Professor of Philosophy at the University of Alberta. Burch is known for his works on continental philosophy. He was the associate editor of Philosophy in Review.

== Books ==
- Between Philosophy and Poetry: Writing, Rhythm, History, edited by Massimo Verdicchio and Robert Burch. Continuum Press. 2002
