= Inquiry =

Type of investigation

An inquiry (also spelled as enquiry in British English) (Note: The UK dictionaries Collins and Longman list the spelling "inquiry" first, and Oxford simply calls it another spelling, without labeling it as US English.) (Note: UK: /ɪnˈkwaɪəri/, US: /ˈɪnkwəri/) is any process that has the aim of augmenting knowledge, resolving doubt, or solving a problem. A theory of inquiry is an account of the various types of inquiry and a treatment of the ways that each type of inquiry achieves its aim.

== Inquiry theories ==
=== Deduction ===
When three terms are so related to one another that the last is wholly contained in the middle and the middle is wholly contained in or excluded from the first, the extremes must admit of perfect syllogism. By 'middle term' I mean that which both is contained in another and contains another in itself, and which is the middle by its position also; and by 'extremes' (a) that which is contained in another, and (b) that in which another is contained. For if A is predicated of all B, and B of all C, A must necessarily be predicated of all C. ... I call this kind of figure the First. (Aristotle, Prior Analytics, 1.4)

=== Induction ===
Inductive reasoning consists in establishing a relation between one extreme term and the middle term by means of the other extreme; for example, if B is the middle term of A and C, in proving by means of C that A applies to B; for this is how we effect inductions. (Aristotle, Prior Analytics, 2.23)

=== Abduction ===
The locus classicus for the study of abductive reasoning is found in Aristotle's Prior Analytics, Book 2, Chapt. 25. It begins this way:

We have Reduction (απαγωγη, abduction):

1. When it is obvious that the first term applies to the middle, but that the middle applies to the last term is not obvious, yet is nevertheless more probable or not less probable than the conclusion;
2. Or if there are not many intermediate terms between the last and the middle;

For in all such cases the effect is to bring us nearer to knowledge.

By way of explanation, Aristotle supplies two very instructive examples, one for each of the two varieties of abductive inference steps that he has just described in the abstract:

1. For example, let A stand for "that which can be taught", B for "knowledge", and C for "morality". Then that knowledge can be taught is evident; but whether virtue is knowledge is not clear. Then if BC is not less probable or is more probable than AC, we have reduction; for we are nearer to knowledge for having introduced an additional term, whereas before we had no knowledge that AC is true.
2. Or again we have reduction if there are not many intermediate terms between B and C; for in this case too we are brought nearer to knowledge. For example, suppose that D is "to square", E "rectilinear figure", and F "circle". Assuming that between E and F there is only one intermediate term — that the circle becomes equal to a rectilinear figure by means of lunules — we should approximate to knowledge. (Aristotle, "Prior Analytics", 2.25, with minor alterations)

Aristotle's latter variety of abductive reasoning, though it will take some explaining in the sequel, is well worth our contemplation, since it hints already at streams of inquiry that course well beyond the syllogistic source from which they spring, and into regions that Peirce will explore more broadly and deeply.

== Inquiry in the pragmatic paradigm ==
In the pragmatic philosophies of Charles Sanders Peirce, William James, John Dewey, and others, inquiry is closely associated with the normative science of logic. In its inception, the pragmatic model or theory of inquiry was extracted by Peirce from its raw materials in classical logic, with a little bit of help from Kant, and refined in parallel with the early development of symbolic logic by Boole, De Morgan, and Peirce himself to address problems about the nature and conduct of scientific reasoning. Borrowing a brace of concepts from Aristotle, Peirce examined three fundamental modes of reasoning that play a role in inquiry, commonly known as abductive, deductive, and inductive inference.

In rough terms, abduction is what we use to generate a likely hypothesis or an initial diagnosis in response to a phenomenon of interest or a problem of concern, while deduction is used to clarify, to derive, and to explicate the relevant consequences of the selected hypothesis, and induction is used to test the sum of the predictions against the sum of the data. It needs to be observed that the classical and pragmatic treatments of the types of reasoning, dividing the generic territory of inference as they do into three special parts, arrive at a different characterization of the environs of reason than do those accounts that count only two.

These three processes typically operate in a cyclic fashion, systematically operating to reduce the uncertainties and the difficulties that initiated the inquiry in question, and in this way, to the extent that inquiry is successful, leading to an increase in knowledge or in skills.

In the pragmatic way of thinking everything has a purpose, and the purpose of each thing is the first thing we should try to note about it. The purpose of inquiry is to reduce doubt and lead to a state of belief, which a person in that state will usually call knowledge or certainty. As they contribute to the end of inquiry, we should appreciate that the three kinds of inference describe a cycle that can be understood only as a whole, and none of the three makes complete sense in isolation from the others. For instance, the purpose of abduction is to generate guesses of a kind that deduction can explicate and that induction can evaluate. This places a mild but meaningful constraint on the production of hypotheses, since it is not just any wild guess at explanation that submits itself to reason and bows out when defeated in a match with reality. In a similar fashion, each of the other types of inference realizes its purpose only in accord with its proper role in the whole cycle of inquiry. No matter how much it may be necessary to study these processes in abstraction from each other, the integrity of inquiry places strong limitations on the effective modularity of its principal components.

In Logic: The Theory of Inquiry, John Dewey defined inquiry as "the controlled or directed transformation of an indeterminate situation into one that is so determinate in its constituent distinctions and relations as to convert the elements of the original situation into a unified whole". Dewey and Peirce's conception of inquiry extended beyond a system of thinking and incorporated the social nature of inquiry. These ideas are summarize in the notion Community of inquiry.

=== Art and science of inquiry ===
For our present purposes, the first feature to note in distinguishing the three principal modes of reasoning from each other is whether each of them is exact or approximate in character. In this light, deduction is the only one of the three types of reasoning that can be made exact, in essence, always deriving true conclusions from true premises, while abduction and induction are unavoidably approximate in their modes of operation, involving elements of fallible judgment in practice and inescapable error in their application.

The reason for this is that deduction, in the ideal limit, can be rendered a purely internal process of the reasoning agent, while the other two modes of reasoning essentially demand a constant interaction with the outside world, a source of phenomena and problems that will no doubt continue to exceed the capacities of any finite resource, human or machine, to master. Situated in this larger reality, approximations can be judged appropriate only in relation to their context of use and can be judged fitting only with regard to a purpose in view.

A parallel distinction that is often made in this connection is to call deduction a demonstrative form of inference, while abduction and induction are classed as non-demonstrative forms of reasoning. Strictly speaking, the latter two modes of reasoning are not properly called inferences at all. They are more like controlled associations of words or ideas that just happen to be successful often enough to be preserved as useful heuristic strategies in the repertoire of the agent. But non-demonstrative ways of thinking are inherently subject to error, and must be constantly checked out and corrected as needed in practice.

In classical terminology, forms of judgment that require attention to the context and the purpose of the judgment are said to involve an element of "art", in a sense that is judged to distinguish them from "science", and in their renderings as expressive judgments to implicate arbiters in styles of rhetoric, as contrasted with logic.

In a figurative sense, this means that only deductive logic can be reduced to an exact theoretical science, while the practice of any empirical science will always remain to some degree an art.

=== Limits to inquiry ===
C. S. Peirce argued that inquiry reaches a logical limit, or "approximate[s] indefinitely toward that limit", which he regarded as "truth".

Jewish rabbinical writers used the text of Deuteronomy 4:32 in the Hebrew Bible, or ask now concerning the days that are past, which were before you, since the day that God created man on the earth, and ask from one end of heaven to the other, whether any great thing like this has happened, or anything like it has been heard, to impose ethical limits on inquiry, forbidding inquiry into the work of creation in the presence of two people, reading the words "for ask now of the days past" to indicate that one may inquire, but not two. The Rabbis reasoned that the words "since the day that God created man upon the earth" in this verse taught that one must not inquire concerning the time before creation, but that the words "the days past that were before you" meant that one may inquire about the six days of creation. They further reasoned that the words "from the one end of heaven to the other" indicated that one must not inquire about what is beyond the universe, what is above and what is below, what is before and what is after.

=== Zeroth order inquiry ===
Many aspects of inquiry can be studied in very simple logical settings, even simpler than the level of syllogism. The sorts of reasoning used by Boolean algebra, propositional logic, or zeroth-order logic can be taken as examples of this. We may well begin at the level of zeroth-order inquiry, in effect, taking the syllogistic approach to inquiry only so far as the propositional or sentential aspects of the associated reasoning processes are concerned. One of the bonuses of doing this in the context of Peirce's logical work is that it provides us with doubly instructive exercises in the use of his logical graphs, taken at the level of his so-called "alpha graphs".

In the case of propositional calculus or sentential logic, deduction comes down to applications of the transitive law for conditional implications and the approximate forms of inference hang on the properties that derive from these. In describing the various types of inference the following employs a few old "terms of art" from classical logic that are still of use in treating these kinds of simple problems in reasoning.

Deduction takes a Case, the minor premise $X \Rightarrow Y$
and combines it with a Rule, the major premise $Y \Rightarrow Z$
to arrive at a Fact, the demonstrative conclusion $X \Rightarrow Z.$

Induction takes a Case of the form $X \Rightarrow Y$
and matches it with a Fact of the form $X \Rightarrow Z$
to infer a Rule of the form $Y \Rightarrow Z.$

Abduction takes a Fact of the form $X \Rightarrow Z$
and matches it with a Rule of the form $Y \Rightarrow Z$
to infer a Case of the form $X \Rightarrow Y.$

For ease of reference, Figure 1 and the Legend beneath it summarize the classical terminology for the three types of inference and the relationships among them.

o-------------------------------------------------o
|                                                 |
|                   Z                             |
|                   o                             |
|                   |\                            |
|                   | \                           |
|                   |  \                          |
|                   |   \                         |
|                   |    \                        |
|                   |     \   R U L E             |
|                   |      \                      |
|                   |       \                     |
|               F   |        \                    |
|                   |         \                   |
|               A   |          \                  |
|                   |           o Y               |
|               C   |          /                  |
|                   |         /                   |
|               T   |        /                    |
|                   |       /                     |
|                   |      /                      |
|                   |     /   C A S E             |
|                   |    /                        |
|                   |   /                         |
|                   |  /                          |
|                   | /                           |
|                   |/                            |
|                   o                             |
|                   X                             |
|                                                 |
| Deduction takes a Case of the form X → Y,       |
| matches it with a Rule of the form Y → Z,       |
| then adverts to a Fact of the form X → Z.       |
|                                                 |
| Induction takes a Case of the form X → Y,       |
| matches it with a Fact of the form X → Z,       |
| then adverts to a Rule of the form Y → Z.       |
|                                                 |
| Abduction takes a Fact of the form X → Z,       |
| matches it with a Rule of the form Y → Z,       |
| then adverts to a Case of the form X → Y.       |
|                                                 |
| Even more succinctly:                           |
|                                                 |
|           Abduction Deduction Induction         |
|                                                 |
| Premise:     Fact Case Case                     |
| Premise:     Rule Rule Fact                     |
| Outcome:     Case Fact Rule                     |
|                                                 |
o-------------------------------------------------o
Figure 1.  Elementary Structure and Terminology

In its original usage a statement of Fact has to do with a deed done or a record made, that is, a type of event that is openly observable and not riddled with speculation as to its very occurrence. In contrast, a statement of Case may refer to a hidden or a hypothetical cause, that is, a type of event that is not immediately observable to all concerned. Obviously, the distinction is a rough one and the question of which mode applies can depend on the points of view that different observers adopt over time. Finally, a statement of a Rule is called that because it states a regularity or a regulation that governs a whole class of situations, and not because of its syntactic form. So far in this discussion, all three types of constraint are expressed in the form of conditional propositions, but this is not a fixed requirement. In practice, these modes of statement are distinguished by the roles that they play within an argument, not by their style of expression. When the time comes to branch out from the syllogistic framework, we will find that propositional constraints can be discovered and represented in arbitrary syntactic forms.

== Example of inquiry ==
Examples of inquiry, that illustrate the full cycle of its abductive, deductive, and inductive phases, and yet are both concrete and simple enough to be suitable for a first (or zeroth) exposition, are somewhat rare in Peirce's writings, and so let us draw one from the work of fellow pragmatician John Dewey, analyzing it according to the model of zeroth-order inquiry that we developed above.

A man is walking on a warm day. The sky was clear the last time he observed it; but presently he notes, while occupied primarily with other things, that the air is cooler. It occurs to him that it is probably going to rain; looking up, he sees a dark cloud between him and the sun, and he then quickens his steps. What, if anything, in such a situation can be called thought? Neither the act of walking nor the noting of the cold is a thought. Walking is one direction of activity; looking and noting are other modes of activity. The likelihood that it will rain is, however, something suggested. The pedestrian feels the cold; he thinks of clouds and a coming shower. (John Dewey, How We Think, 1910, pp. 6-7).

=== Once over quickly ===
Dewey's example of inquiry in everyday life the quick once over, hitting just the high points of its analysis into Peirce's three kinds of reasoning.

==== Abductive phase ====
In Dewey's "Rainy Day" or "Sign of Rain" story, the peripatetic hero is presented with a surprising fact:

- Fact: C → A, In the Current situation, the Air is cool.

Responding to an intellectual reflex of puzzlement about the situation, his resource of common knowledge about the world is impelled to seize on an approximate Rule:

- Rule: B → A, Just Before it rains, the Air is cool.

This Rule can be recognized as having a potential relevance to the situation because it matches the surprising Fact, C → A, in its consequential feature A.

All of this suggests that the present Case may be one in which it is just about to rain:

- Case: C → B, The Current situation is just Before it rains.

The whole mental performance, however automatic and semi-conscious it may be, that leads up from a problematic Fact and a previously settled knowledge base of Rules to the plausible suggestion of a Case description, is what we are calling an abductive inference.

==== Deductive phase ====
The next phase of inquiry uses deductive inference to expand the implied consequences of the abductive hypothesis, with the aim of testing its truth. For this purpose, the inquirer needs to think of other things that would follow from the consequence of his precipitate explanation. Thus, he now reflects on the Case just assumed:

- Case: C → B, The Current situation is just Before it rains.

He looks up to scan the sky, perhaps in a random search for further information, but since the sky is a logical place to look for details of an imminent rainstorm, symbolized in our story by the letter B, we may safely suppose that our reasoner has already detached the consequence of the abduced Case, C → B, and has begun to expand on its further implications. So let us imagine that our up-looker has a more deliberate purpose in mind, and that his search for additional data is driven by the new-found, determinate Rule:

- Rule: B → D, Just Before it rains, Dark clouds appear.

Contemplating the assumed Case in combination with this new Rule leads him by an immediate deduction to predict an additional Fact:

- Fact: C → D, In the Current situation Dark clouds appear.

The reconstructed picture of reasoning assembled in this second phase of inquiry is true to the pattern of deductive inference.

==== Inductive phase ====
Whatever the case, our subject observes a Dark cloud, just as he would expect on the basis of the new hypothesis. The explanation of imminent rain removes the discrepancy between observations and expectations and thereby reduces the shock of surprise that made this process of inquiry necessary.

=== Looking more closely ===
==== Seeding hypotheses ====
Figure 4 gives a graphical illustration of Dewey's example of inquiry, isolating for the purposes of the present analysis the first two steps in the more extended proceedings that go to make up the whole inquiry.

o-----------------------------------------------------------o
|                                                           |
|     A                                               D     |
|      o                                             o      |
|       \ *                                       * /       |
|        \  *                                   *  /        |
|         \   *                               *   /         |
|          \    *                           *    /          |
|           \     *                       *     /           |
|            \   R u l e             R u l e   /            |
|             \       *               *       /             |
|              \        *           *        /              |
|               \         *       *         /               |
|                \          * B *          /                |
|              F a c t        o        F a c t              |
|                  \          *          /                  |
|                   \         *         /                   |
|                    \        *        /                    |
|                     \       *       /                     |
|                      \   C a s e   /                      |
|                       \     *     /                       |
|                        \    *    /                        |
|                         \   *   /                         |
|                          \  *  /                          |
|                           \ * /                           |
|                            \*/                            |
|                             o                             |
|                             C                             |
|                                                           |
| A  =  the Air is cool                                     |
| B  =  just Before it rains                                |
| C  =  the Current situation                               |
| D  =  a Dark cloud appears                                |
|                                                           |
| A is a major term                                         |
| B is a middle term                                        |
| C is a minor term                                         |
| D is a major term, associated with A                      |
|                                                           |
o-----------------------------------------------------------o
Figure 4.  Dewey's 'Rainy Day' Inquiry

In this analysis of the first steps of Inquiry, we have a complex or a mixed form of inference that can be seen as taking place in two steps:

- The first step is an Abduction that abstracts a Case from the consideration of a Fact and a Rule.

Fact: C → A, In the Current situation the Air is cool.
Rule: B → A, Just Before it rains, the Air is cool.
Case: C → B, The Current situation is just Before it rains.

- The final step is a Deduction that admits this Case to another Rule and so arrives at a novel Fact.

Case: C → B, The Current situation is just Before it rains.
Rule: B → D, Just Before it rains, a Dark cloud will appear.
Fact: C → D, In the Current situation, a Dark cloud will appear.

This is nowhere near a complete analysis of the Rainy Day inquiry, even insofar as it might be carried out within the constraints of the syllogistic framework, and it covers only the first two steps of the relevant inquiry process, but maybe it will do for a start.

One other thing needs to be noticed here, the formal duality between this expansion phase of inquiry and the argument from analogy. This can be seen most clearly in the propositional lattice diagrams shown in Figures 3 and 4, where analogy exhibits a rough "A" shape and the first two steps of inquiry exhibit a rough "V" shape, respectively. Since we find ourselves repeatedly referring to this expansion phase of inquiry as a unit, let's give it a name that suggests its duality with analogy—"catalogy" will do for the moment. This usage is apt enough if one thinks of a catalogue entry for an item as a text that lists its salient features. Notice that analogy has to do with the examples of a given quality, while catalogy has to do with the qualities of a given example. Peirce noted similar forms of duality in many of his early writings, leading to the consummate treatment in his 1867 paper "On a New List of Categories" (CP 1.545-559, W 2, 49-59).

==== Weeding hypotheses ====
In order to comprehend the bearing of inductive reasoning on the closing phases of inquiry there are a couple of observations that we need to make:

- First, we need to recognize that smaller inquiries are typically woven into larger inquiries, whether we view the whole pattern of inquiry as carried on by a single agent or by a complex community.
- Further, we need to consider the different ways in which the particular instances of inquiry can be related to ongoing inquiries at larger scales. Three modes of inductive interaction between the micro-inquiries and the macro-inquiries that are salient here can be described under the headings of the "Learning", the "Transfer", and the "Testing" of rules.

==== Analogy of experience ====
Throughout inquiry the reasoner makes use of rules that have to be transported across intervals of experience, from the masses of experience where they are learned to the moments of experience where they are applied. Inductive reasoning is involved in the learning and the transfer of these rules, both in accumulating a knowledge base and in carrying it through the times between acquisition and application.

- Learning. The principal way that induction contributes to an ongoing inquiry is through the learning of rules, that is, by creating each of the rules that goes into the knowledge base, or ever gets used along the way.
- Transfer. The continuing way that induction contributes to an ongoing inquiry is through the exploit of analogy, a two-step combination of induction and deduction that serves to transfer rules from one context to another.
- Testing. Finally, every inquiry that makes use of a knowledge base constitutes a "field test" of its accumulated contents. If the knowledge base fails to serve any live inquiry in a satisfactory manner, then there is a prima facie reason to reconsider and possibly to amend some of its rules.

Let's now consider how these principles of learning, transfer, and testing apply to John Dewey's "Sign of Rain" example.

===== Learning =====
Rules in a knowledge base, as far as their effective content goes, can be obtained by any mode of inference.

For example, a rule like:

- Rule: B → A, Just Before it rains, the Air is cool,

is usually induced from a consideration of many past events, in a manner that can be rationally reconstructed as follows:

- Case: C → B, In Certain events, it is just Before it rains,
- Fact: C → A, In Certain events, the Air is cool,
------------------------------------------------------------------------------------------
- Rule: B → A, Just Before it rains, the Air is cool.

However, the very same proposition could also be abduced as an explanation of a singular occurrence or deduced as a conclusion of a presumptive theory.

===== Transfer =====
What is it that gives a distinctively inductive character to the acquisition of a knowledge base? It is evidently the "analogy of experience" that underlies its useful application. Whenever we find ourselves prefacing an argument with the phrase "If past experience is any guide..." then we can be sure that this principle has come into play. We are invoking an analogy between past experience, considered as a totality, and present experience, considered as a point of application. What we mean in practice is this: "If past experience is a fair sample of possible experience, then the knowledge gained in it applies to present experience". This is the mechanism that allows a knowledge base to be carried across gulfs of experience that are indifferent to the effective contents of its rules.

Here are the details of how this notion of transfer works out in the case of the "Sign of Rain" example:

Let K(pres) be a portion of the reasoner's knowledge base that is logically equivalent to the conjunction of two rules, as follows:

- K(pres) = (B → A) and (B → D).

K(pres) is the present knowledge base, expressed in the form of a logical constraint on the present universe of discourse.

It is convenient to have the option of expressing all logical statements in terms of their logical models, that is, in terms of the primitive circumstances or the elements of experience over which they hold true.

- Let E(past) be the chosen set of experiences, or the circumstances that we have in mind when we refer to "past experience".
- Let E(poss) be the collective set of experiences, or the projective total of possible circumstances.
- Let E(pres) be the present experience, or the circumstances that are present to the reasoner at the current moment.

If we think of the knowledge base K(pres) as referring to the "regime of experience" over which it is valid, then all of these sets of models can be compared by the simple relations of set inclusion or logical implication.

Figure 5 schematizes this way of viewing the "analogy of experience".

o-----------------------------------------------------------o
|                                                           |
|                          K(pres)                          |
|                             o                             |
|                            /|\                            |
|                           / | \                           |
|                          /  |  \                          |
|                         /   |   \                         |
|                        /  Rule   \                        |
|                       /     |     \                       |
|                      /      |      \                      |
|                     /       |       \                     |
|                    /     E(poss)     \                    |
|              Fact /         o         \ Fact              |
|                  /        *   *        \                  |
|                 /       *       *       \                 |
|                /      *           *      \                |
|               /     *               *     \               |
|              /    *                   *    \              |
|             /   *  Case           Case  *   \             |
|            /  *                           *  \            |
|           / *                               * \           |
|          /*                                   *\          |
|         o<<<---------------<<<---------------<<<o         |
|      E(past)        Analogy Morphism         E(pres)      |
|    More Known                              Less Known     |
|                                                           |
o-----------------------------------------------------------o
Figure 5.  Analogy of Experience

In these terms, the "analogy of experience" proceeds by inducing a Rule about the validity of a current knowledge base and then deducing a Fact, its applicability to a current experience, as in the following sequence:

Inductive Phase:

- Given Case: E(past) → E(poss), Chosen events fairly sample Collective events.
- Given Fact: E(past) → K(pres), Chosen events support the Knowledge regime.
-----------------------------------------------------------------------------------------------------------------------------
- Induce Rule: E(poss) → K(pres), Collective events support the Knowledge regime.

Deductive Phase:

- Given Case: E(pres) → E(poss), Current events fairly sample Collective events.
- Given Rule: E(poss) → K(pres), Collective events support the Knowledge regime.
--------------------------------------------------------------------------------------------------------------------------------
- Deduce Fact: E(pres) → K(pres), Current events support the Knowledge regime.

===== Testing =====
If the observer looks up and does not see dark clouds, or if he runs for shelter but it does not rain, then there is fresh occasion to question the utility or the validity of his knowledge base. The logical analysis of this testing phase is deferred to another occasion.

== See also ==
- Charles Sanders Peirce bibliography
- Community of inquiry
- C. West Churchman
- Curiosity
- Empirical limits in science
- Information entropy
- Information theory
- Inquisitive learning
- Instrumental and intrinsic value
- Logic of information
- Models of scientific inquiry
- Pragmatic information
- Pragmatic theory of truth
- Pragmaticism
- Research
- Research question
- Uncertainty

== Bibliography ==
- Angluin, Dana (1989), "Learning with Hints", pp. 167–181 in David Haussler and Leonard Pitt (eds.), Proceedings of the 1988 Workshop on Computational Learning Theory, MIT, 3–5 August 1988, Morgan Kaufmann, San Mateo, CA, 1989.
- Aristotle, "Prior Analytics", Hugh Tredennick (trans.), pp. 181–531 in Aristotle, Volume 1, Loeb Classical Library, William Heinemann, London, UK, 1938.
- Awbrey, Jon, and Awbrey, Susan (1995), "Interpretation as Action : The Risk of Inquiry", Inquiry : Critical Thinking Across the Disciplines 15, 40–52. Eprint.
- Delaney, C.F. (1993), Science, Knowledge, and Mind: A Study in the Philosophy of C.S. Peirce, University of Notre Dame Press, Notre Dame, IN.
- Dewey, John (1910), How We Think, D.C. Heath, Lexington, MA, 1910. Reprinted, Prometheus Books, Buffalo, NY, 1991.
- Dewey, John (1938), Logic: The Theory of Inquiry, Henry Holt and Company, New York, NY, 1938. Reprinted as pp. 1–527 in John Dewey, The Later Works, 1925–1953, Volume 12: 1938, Jo Ann Boydston (ed.), Kathleen Poulos (text. ed.), Ernest Nagel (intro.), Southern Illinois University Press, Carbondale and Edwardsville, IL, 1986.
- Haack, Susan (1993), Evidence and Inquiry: Towards Reconstruction in Epistemology, Blackwell Publishers, Oxford, UK.
- Hanson, Norwood Russell (1958), Patterns of Discovery, An Inquiry into the Conceptual Foundations of Science, Cambridge University Press, Cambridge, UK.
- Hendricks, Vincent F. (2005), Thought 2 Talk: A Crash Course in Reflection and Expression, Automatic Press / VIP, New York, NY. ISBN 87-991013-7-8
- Maxwell, Nicholas (2007) From Knowledge to Wisdom, Pentire Press, London.
- Maxwell, Nicholas (2017), In Praise of Natural Philosophy: A Revolution for Thought and Life, McGill-Queen's University Press, Montreal.
- Misak, Cheryl J. (1991), Truth and the End of Inquiry, A Peircean Account of Truth, Oxford University Press, Oxford, UK.
- Peirce, C.S., (1931–1935, 1958), Collected Papers of Charles Sanders Peirce, vols. 1–6, Charles Hartshorne and Paul Weiss (eds.), vols. 7–8, Arthur W. Burks (ed.), Harvard University Press, Cambridge, MA. Cited as CP volume.paragraph.
- Stalnaker, Robert C. (1984), Inquiry, MIT Press, Cambridge, MA.
