= Sign relation =

Concept in semiotics

A sign relation is the basic construct in the theory of signs, also known as semiotics, as developed by Charles Sanders Peirce.

== Definition ==
One of Peirce's clearest and most complete definitions of a sign is one that he gives, not incidentally, in the context of defining "logic", and so it is informative to view it in that setting.

Logic will here be defined as formal semiotic. A definition of a sign will be given which no more refers to human thought than does the definition of a line as the place which a particle occupies, part by part, during a lapse of time. Namely, a sign is something, A, which brings something, B, its interpretant sign determined or created by it, into the same sort of correspondence with something, C, its object, as that in which itself stands to C. It is from this definition, together with a definition of "formal", that I deduce mathematically the principles of logic. I also make a historical review of all the definitions and conceptions of logic, and show, not merely that my definition is no novelty, but that my non-psychological conception of logic has virtually been quite generally held, though not generally recognized.

In the general discussion of diverse theories of signs, the question frequently arises whether signhood is an absolute, essential, indelible, or ontological property of a thing, or whether it is a relational, interpretive, and mutable role that a thing can be said to have only within a particular context of relationships.

In his picturesque illustration of a sign relation, along with his tracing of a corresponding sign process, or semiosis, Peirce uses the technical term representamen for his concept of a sign, but the shorter word is precise enough, so long as one recognizes that its meaning in a particular theory of signs is given by a specific definition of what it means to be a sign:

Thus, if a sunflower, in turning towards the sun, becomes by that very act fully capable, without further condition, of reproducing a sunflower which turns in precisely corresponding ways toward the sun, and of doing so with the same reproductive power, the sunflower would become a Representamen of the sun.

Peirce's definition of a sign defines it in relation to its object and its interpretant sign, and thus it defines signhood in relative terms, by means of a predicate with three places. In this definition, signhood is a role in a triadic relation, a role that a thing bears or plays in a given context of relationships – it is not as an absolute, non-relative property of a thing-in-itself, one that it possesses independently of all relationships to other things.

Some of the terms that Peirce uses in his definition of a sign may need to be elaborated for the contemporary reader.

- Correspondence. From the way that Peirce uses this term throughout his work, it is clear that he means what he elsewhere calls a "triple correspondence", and thus this is just another way of referring to the whole triadic sign relation itself. In particular, his use of this term should not be taken to imply a dyadic correspondence, like the kinds of "mirror image" correspondence between realities and representations.
- Determination. Peirce's concept of determination is broader in several directions than the sense of the word that refers to strictly deterministic causal-temporal processes. First, and especially in this context, he is invoking a more general concept of determination, what is called a formal or informational determination, as in saying "two points determine a line", rather than the more special cases of causal and temporal determinisms. Second, he characteristically allows for what is called determination in measure, that is, an order of determinism that admits a full spectrum of more and less determined relationships.
- Non-psychological. Peirce's "non-psychological conception of logic" must be distinguished from any variety of anti-psychologism. He was quite interested in matters of psychology and had much of import to say about them. But logic and psychology operate on different planes of study even when they have occasion to view the same data, as logic is a normative science where psychology is a descriptive science, and so they have very different aims, methods, and rationales.

== Signs and inquiry ==
There is a close relationship between the pragmatic theory of signs and the pragmatic theory of inquiry. In fact, the correspondence between the two studies exhibits so many congruences and parallels that it is often best to treat them as integral parts of one and the same subject. In a very real sense, inquiry is the process by which sign relations come to be established and continue to evolve. In other words, inquiry, "thinking" in its best sense, "is a term denoting the various ways in which things acquire significance" (John Dewey). Thus, there is an active and intricate form of cooperation that needs to be appreciated and maintained between these converging modes of investigation. Its proper character is best understood by realizing that the theory of inquiry is adapted to study the developmental aspects of sign relations, a subject which the theory of signs is specialized to treat from structural and comparative points of view.

== Examples of sign relations ==
Because the examples to follow have been artificially constructed to be as simple as possible, their detailed elaboration can run the risk of trivializing the whole theory of sign relations. Despite their simplicity, however, these examples have subtleties of their own, and their careful treatment will serve to illustrate many important issues in the general theory of signs.

Imagine a discussion between two people, Ann and Bob, and attend only to that aspect of their interpretive practice that involves the use of the following nouns and pronouns: "Ann", "Bob", "I", "you".

The object domain of this discussion fragment is the set of two people {Ann, Bob}. The syntactic domain or the sign system that is involved in their discussion is limited to the set of four signs {"Ann", "Bob", "I", "You"}.

In their discussion, Ann and Bob are not only the passive objects of nominative and accusative references but also the active interpreters of the language that they use. The system of interpretation (SOI) associated with each language user can be represented in the form of an individual three-place relation called the sign relation of that interpreter.

Understood in terms of its set-theoretic extension, a sign relation L is a subset of a cartesian product O × S × I. Here, O, S, I are three sets that are known as the object domain, the sign domain, and the interpretant domain, respectively, of the sign relation L ⊆ O × S × I.

Broadly speaking, the three domains of a sign relation can be any sets whatsoever, but the kinds of sign relations that are typically contemplated in a computational setting are usually constrained to having I ⊆ S. In this case, interpretants are just a special variety of signs, and this makes it convenient to lump signs and interpretants together into a single class called the syntactic domain. In the forthcoming examples, S and I are identical as sets, so the same elements manifest themselves in two different roles of the sign relations in question. When it is necessary to refer to the whole set of objects and signs in the union of the domains O, S, I for a given sign relation L, one may refer to this set as the world of L and write W = W_{L} = O ∪ S ∪ I.

To facilitate an interest in the abstract structures of sign relations, and to keep the notations as brief as possible as the examples become more complicated, it serves to introduce the following general notations:

O	=	Object Domain
S	=	Sign Domain
I	=	Interpretant Domain

Introducing a few abbreviations for use in considering the present Example, we have the following data:

O	=	{Ann, Bob}	=	{A, B}
S	=	{"Ann", "Bob", "I", "You"}	=	{"A", "B", "i", "u"}
I	=	{"Ann", "Bob", "I", "You"}	=	{"A", "B", "i", "u"}

In the present Example, S = I = Syntactic Domain.

The next two Tables give the sign relations associated with the interpreters A and B, respectively, putting them in the form of relational databases. Thus, the rows of each Table list the ordered triples of the form (o, s, i) that make up the corresponding sign relations, L_{A} and L_{B} ⊆ O × S × I. It is often tempting to use the same names for objects and for relations involving these objects, but it is best to avoid this in a first approach, taking up the issues that this practice raises after the less problematic features of these relations have been treated.

Sign Relation of Interpreter A
Object	Sign	Interpretant
A	"A"	"A"
A	"A"	"i"
A	"i"	"A"
A	"i"	"i"
B	"B"	"B"
B	"B"	"u"
B	"u"	"B"
B	"u"	"u"

Sign Relation of Interpreter B
Object	Sign	Interpretant
A	"A"	"A"
A	"A"	"u"
A	"u"	"A"
A	"u"	"u"
B	"B"	"B"
B	"B"	"i"
B	"i"	"B"
B	"i"	"i"

These Tables codify a rudimentary level of interpretive practice for the agents A and B, and provide a basis for formalizing the initial semantics that is appropriate to their common syntactic domain. Each row of a Table names an object and two co-referent signs, making up an ordered triple of the form (o, s, i) that is called an elementary relation, that is, one element of the relation's set-theoretic extension.

Already in this elementary context, there are several different meanings that might attach to the project of a formal semiotics, or a formal theory of meaning for signs. In the process of discussing these alternatives, it is useful to introduce a few terms that are occasionally used in the philosophy of language to point out the needed distinctions.

== Dyadic aspects of sign relations ==
For an arbitrary triadic relation L ⊆ O × S × I, whether it is a sign relation or not, there are six dyadic relations that can be obtained by projecting L on one of the planes of the OSI-space O × S × I. The six dyadic projections of a triadic relation L are defined and notated as follows:

L_{OS}	=	proj_{OS}(L)	=	{ (o, s) ∈ O × S : (o, s, i) ∈ L for some i ∈ I }
L_{SO}	=	proj_{SO}(L)	=	{ (s, o) ∈ S × O : (o, s, i) ∈ L for some i ∈ I }
L_{IS}	=	proj_{IS}(L)	=	{ (i, s) ∈ I × S : (o, s, i) ∈ L for some o ∈ O }
L_{SI}	=	proj_{SI}(L)	=	{ (s, i) ∈ S × I : (o, s, i) ∈ L for some o ∈ O }
L_{OI}	=	proj_{OI}(L)	=	{ (o, i) ∈ O × I : (o, s, i) ∈ L for some s ∈ S }
L_{IO}	=	proj_{IO}(L)	=	{ (i, o) ∈ I × O : (o, s, i) ∈ L for some s ∈ S }

By way of unpacking the set-theoretic notation, here is what the first definition says in ordinary language. The dyadic relation that results from the projection of L on the OS-plane O × S is written briefly as L_{OS} or written more fully as proj_{OS}(L), and it is defined as the set of all ordered pairs (o, s) in the cartesian product O × S for which there exists an ordered triple (o, s, i) in L for some interpretant i in the interpretant domain I.

In the case where L is a sign relation, which it becomes by satisfying one of the definitions of a sign relation, some of the dyadic aspects of L can be recognized as formalizing aspects of sign meaning that have received their share of attention from students of signs over the centuries, and thus they can be associated with traditional concepts and terminology. Of course, traditions may vary as to the precise formation and usage of such concepts and terms. Other aspects of meaning have not received their fair share of attention, and thus remain anonymous on the contemporary scene of sign studies.

=== Denotation ===
One aspect of a sign's complete meaning is concerned with the reference that a sign has to its objects, which objects are collectively known as the denotation of the sign. In the pragmatic theory of sign relations, denotative references fall within the projection of the sign relation on the plane that is spanned by its object domain and its sign domain.

The dyadic relation that makes up the denotative, referential, or semantic aspect or component of a sign relation L is notated as Den(L). Information about the denotative aspect of meaning is obtained from L by taking its projection on the object-sign plane, in other words, on the 2-dimensional space that is generated by the object domain O and the sign domain S. This semantic component of a sign relation L is written in any one of the forms, L_{OS}, proj_{OS}L, L_{12}, proj_{12}L, and it is defined as follows:

Den(L) = proj_{OS}L = { (o, s) ∈ O × S : (o, s, i) ∈ L for some i ∈ I }.

Looking to the denotative aspects of L_{A} and L_{B}, various rows of the Tables specify, for example, that A uses "i" to denote A and "u" to denote B, whereas B uses "i" to denote B and "u" to denote A. All of these denotative references are summed up in the projections on the OS-plane, as shown in the following Tables:

proj_{OS}(L_{A})
Object	Sign
A	"A"
A	"i"
B	"B"
B	"u"

proj_{OS}(L_{B})
Object	Sign
A	"A"
A	"u"
B	"B"
B	"i"

=== Connotation ===
Another aspect of meaning concerns the connection that a sign has to its interpretants within a given sign relation. As before, this type of connection can be vacuous, singular, or plural in its collection of terminal points, and it can be formalized as the dyadic relation that is obtained as a planar projection of the triadic sign relation in question.

The connection that a sign makes to an interpretant is here referred to as its connotation. In the full theory of sign relations, this aspect of meaning includes the links that a sign has to affects, concepts, ideas, impressions, intentions, and the whole realm of an agent's mental states and allied activities, broadly encompassing intellectual associations, emotional impressions, motivational impulses, and real conduct. Taken at the full, in the natural setting of semiotic phenomena, this complex system of references is unlikely ever to find itself mapped in much detail, much less completely formalized, but the tangible warp of its accumulated mass is commonly alluded to as the connotative import of language.

Formally speaking, however, the connotative aspect of meaning presents no additional difficulty. For a given sign relation L, the dyadic relation that constitutes the connotative aspect or connotative component of L is notated as Con(L).

The connotative aspect of a sign relation L is given by its projection on the plane of signs and interpretants, and is thus defined as follows:

Con(L) = proj_{SI}L = { (s, i) ∈ S × I : (o, s, i) ∈ L for some o ∈ O }.

All of these connotative references are summed up in the projections on the SI-plane, as shown in the following Tables:

proj_{SI}(L_{A})
Sign	Interpretant
"A"	"A"
"A"	"i"
"i"	"A"
"i"	"i"
"B"	"B"
"B"	"u"
"u"	"B"
"u"	"u"

proj_{SI}(L_{B})
Sign	Interpretant
"A"	"A"
"A"	"u"
"u"	"A"
"u"	"u"
"B"	"B"
"B"	"i"
"i"	"B"
"i"	"i"

=== Ennotation ===
The aspect of a sign's meaning that arises from the dyadic relation of its objects to its interpretants has no standard name. If an interpretant is considered to be a sign in its own right, then its independent reference to an object can be taken as belonging to another moment of denotation, but this neglects the mediational character of the whole transaction in which this occurs. Denotation and connotation have to do with dyadic relations in which the sign plays an active role, but here we have to consider a dyadic relation between objects and interpretants that is mediated by the sign from an off-stage position, as it were. As a relation between objects and interpretants that is mediated by a sign, this aspect of meaning may be referred to as the ennotation of a sign, and the dyadic relation that constitutes the ennotative aspect of a sign relation L may be notated as Enn(L).

The ennotational component of meaning for a sign relation L is captured by its projection on the plane of the object and interpretant domains, and it is thus defined as follows:

Enn(L) = proj_{OI}L = { (o, i) ∈ O × I : (o, s, i) ∈ L for some s ∈ S }.

As it happens, the sign relations L_{A} and L_{B} are fully symmetric with respect to exchanging signs and interpretants, so all of the data of proj_{OS}L_{A} is echoed unchanged in proj_{OI}L_{A} and all of the data of proj_{OS}L_{B} is echoed unchanged in proj_{OI}L_{B}.

proj_{OI}(L_{A})
Object	Interpretant
A	"A"
A	"i"
B	"B"
B	"u"

proj_{OI}(L_{B})
Object	Interpretant
A	"A"
A	"u"
B	"B"
B	"i"

== Six equivalent arrangements ==
In the context of 3-adic relations in general, Peirce provides the following illustration of the six converses of a 3-adic relation, that is, the six differently ordered ways of stating what is logically the same 3-adic relation *A gives B to C), we make no distinction in the ordinary logic of relations between the subject nominative, the direct object, and the indirect object. We say that the proposition has three logical subjects. We regard it as a mere affair of English grammar that there are six ways of expressing this:

- A gives B to C
- A benefits C with B
- B enriches C at expense of A
- C receives B from A
- C thanks A for B
- B leaves A for C

These six sentences express one and the same indivisible phenomenon.

=== OIS ===
Words spoken are symbols or signs (σύμβολα) of affections or impressions (παθήματα) of the soul (ψυχή); written words are the signs of words spoken. As writing, so also is speech not the same for all races of men. But the mental affections themselves, of which these words are primarily signs (σημεῖα), are the same for the whole of mankind, as are also the objects (πράγματα) of which those affections are representations or likenesses, images, copies (ὁμοιώματα). (Aristotle, De Interpretatione, 1.16^{a}4).

=== SIO ===
Logic will here be defined as formal semiotic. A definition of a sign will be given which no more refers to human thought than does the definition of a line as the place which a particle occupies, part by part, during a lapse of time. Namely, a sign is something, A, which brings something, B, its interpretant sign determined or created by it, into the same sort of correspondence with something, C, its object, as that in which itself stands to C. It is from this definition, together with a definition of "formal", that I deduce mathematically the principles of logic. I also make a historical review of all the definitions and conceptions of logic, and show, not merely that my definition is no novelty, but that my non-psychological conception of logic has virtually been quite generally held, though not generally recognized. (C.S. Peirce, "Application to the Carnegie Institution", L75 (1902), NEM 4, 20-21).

=== SOI ===
A Sign is anything which is related to a Second thing, its Object, in respect to a Quality, in such a way as to bring a Third thing, its Interpretant, into relation to the same Object, and that in such a way as to bring a Fourth into relation to that Object in the same form, ad infinitum. (CP 2.92; quoted in Fisch 1986: 274)

== See also ==
- Logic of information
- Meaning – Philosophical concept
- Pragmatic theory of information

== Bibliography ==
=== Primary sources ===
- Charles Sanders Peirce bibliography

=== Secondary sources ===
- Deledalle, Gérard (2000), C.S. Peirce's Philosophy of Signs, Indiana University Press.
- Eisele, Carolyn (1979), in Studies in the Scientific and Mathematical Philosophy of C.S. Peirce, Richard Milton Martin (ed.), Mouton, The Hague.
- Esposito, Joseph (1980), Evolutionary Metaphysics: The Development of Peirce's Theory of Categories, Ohio University Press (?).
- Fisch, Max (1986), Peirce, Semeiotic, and Pragmatism, Indiana University Press.
- Houser, N., Roberts, D.D., and Van Evra, J. (eds.)(1997), Studies in the Logic of C.S. Peirce, Indiana University Press.
- Liszka, J.J. (1996), A General Introduction to the Semeiotic of C.S. Peirce, Indiana University Press.
- Misak, C. (ed.)(2004), Cambridge Companion to C.S. Peirce, Cambridge University Press.
- Moore, E., and Robin, R. (1964), Studies in the Philosophy of C.S. Peirce, Second Series, University of Massachusetts Press, Amherst, MA.
- Murphey, M. (1961), The Development of Peirce's Thought. Reprinted, Hackett, Indianapolis, IN, 1993.
- Walker Percy (2000), pp. 271–291 in Signposts in a Strange Land, P. Samway (ed.), Saint Martin's Press.
