= Robert W. Burch =

American philosopher

- Born: Robert William Burch; March 31, 1943 (age 83)

Education
- Education: Rice University (BA, PhD)

Philosophical work
- Era: Contemporary philosophy
- Region: Western philosophy
- School: Pragmatism
- Institutions: Texas A&M University
- Main interests: Logic, American philosophy

Robert William Burch (born March 31, 1943) is an American philosopher and Professor of Philosophy at Texas A&M University. Burch is known for his works on logic and American philosophy.

== Books ==
- Study Guide for Hurley's Logic. Belmont, CA: Wadsworth Publishing Company, 1981 (10th edition 2008).
- Peircean Reduction Thesis: the Foundations of Topological Logic. Lubbock, TX: Texas Tech University Press, 1991.
