= Pragmaticism =

Branch of pragmatic philosophy

"Pragmaticism" is a term used by Charles Sanders Peirce for his pragmatic philosophy starting in 1905, in order to distance himself and it from pragmatism, the original name, which had been used in a manner he did not approve of in the "literary journals".

Peirce in 1905 announced his coinage "pragmaticism", saying that it was "ugly enough to be safe from kidnappers" (Collected Papers (CP) 5.414). Today, outside of philosophy, "pragmatism" is often taken to refer to a compromise of aims or principles, even a ruthless search for mercenary advantage. Peirce gave other or more specific reasons for the distinction in a surviving draft letter that year and in later writings. Peirce's pragmatism, that is, pragmaticism, differed in Peirce's view from other pragmatisms by its commitments to the spirit of strict logic, the immutability of truth, the reality of infinity, and the difference between (1) actively willing to control thought, to doubt, to weigh reasons, and (2) willing not to exert the will, willing to believe. In his view his pragmatism is, strictly speaking, not itself a whole philosophy, but instead a general method for the clarification of ideas. He first publicly formulated his pragmatism as an aspect of scientific logic along with principles of statistics and modes of inference in his "Illustrations of the Logic of Science" series of articles in 1877-8.

== Pragmatic maxim ==
Whether one chooses to call it "pragmatism" or "pragmaticism"—and Peirce himself was not always consistent about it even after the notorious renaming—his conception of pragmatic philosophy is based on one or another version of the so-called "pragmatic maxim". Here is one of his more emphatic statements of it:

Pragmaticism was originally enounced in the form of a maxim, as follows: Consider what effects, that might conceivably have practical bearings, you conceive the objects of your conception to have. Then, your conception of those effects is the whole of your conception of the object (CP 5.438).

In the 1909 Century Dictionary Supplement, the entry for pragmaticism by John Dewey was

pragmaticism (prag-mat′i-sizm), n. [pragmatic + ism.] A special and limited form of pragmatism, in which the pragmatism is restricted to the determining of the meaning of concepts (particularly of philosophic concepts) by consideration of the experimental differences in the conduct of life which would conceivably result from the affirmation or denial of the meaning in question.

He [the writer] framed the theory that a conception, that is, the rational purport of a word or other expression, lies exclusively in its conceivable bearing upon the conduct of life. . . . To serve the precise purpose of expressing the original definition, he begs to announce the birth of the word "pragmaticism." C. S. Peirce, in The Monist, April, 1905, p. 166.

== Pragmatism's origin ==
Pragmatism as a philosophical movement originated in 1872 in discussions in The Metaphysical Club among Peirce, William James, Chauncey Wright, John Fiske, Francis Ellingwood Abbot, and lawyers Nicholas St. John Green and Joseph Bangs Warner (1848–1923). The first use in print of the name pragmatism appears to have been in 1898 by James, who credited Peirce with having coined the name during the early 1870s.

James, among others, regarded Peirce's 1877-8 "Illustrations of the Logic of Science" series, especially "How to Make Our Ideas Clear" (1878) as pragmatism's foundation. Peirce (CP 5.11-12), like James saw pragmatism as embodying familiar attitudes, in philosophy and elsewhere, elaborated into a new deliberate method of thinking and resolving dilemmas. Peirce differed from James and the early John Dewey, in some of their tangential enthusiasms, in being decidedly more rationalistic and realistic, in several senses of those terms, throughout the preponderance of his own philosophical moods.

In a 1906 manuscript, Peirce wrote that, in the Metaphysical Club decades earlier, Nicholas St. John Green

often urged the importance of applying Bain's definition of belief, as "that upon which a man is prepared to act." From this definition, pragmatism is scarce more than a corollary; so that I am disposed to think of him as the grandfather of pragmatism.

James and Peirce, inspired by crucial links among belief, conduct, and disposition, agreed with Green. John Shook has said, "Chauncey Wright also deserves considerable credit, for as both Peirce and James recall, it was Wright who demanded a phenomenalist and fallibilist empiricism as a vital alternative to rationalistic speculation."

Pragmatism is regarded as a distinctively American philosophy. As advocated by James, John Dewey, F. C. S. Schiller, George Herbert Mead, and others, it has proved durable and popular. But Peirce did not seize on this fact to enhance his reputation, and even coined the word "pragmaticism" to distinguish his philosophical position.

== Clarification of ideas in inquiry ==
Pragmatism starts with the idea that belief is that upon which one is prepared to act. Peirce's pragmatism is about conceptions of objects. His pragmatism is a method for fruitfully sorting out conceptual confusions caused, for example, by distinctions that make (sometimes needful) formal yet not practical differences. It equates any conception of an object with a conception of that object's effects to a general extent of those conceived effects' conceivable implications for informed practice. Those conceivable practical implications are the conception's meaning. The meaning is the consequent form of conduct or practice that would be implied by accepting the conception as true. Peirce's pragmaticism, in the strict sense, is about the conceptual elucidation of conceptions into such meanings — about how to make our ideas clear. Making them true, in the sense of proving and bearing them out in fruitful practice, goes beyond that. A conception's truth is its correspondence to the real, to that which would be found by investigation taken far enough. A conception's actual confirmation (if it occurs) is neither its meaning nor its truth per se, but an actual upshot.

In "How to Make Our Ideas Clear", Peirce discusses three grades of clearness of conception:

1. Clearness of a conception familiar and readily used even if unanalyzed and undeveloped.
2. Clearness of a conception in virtue of clearness of its definition's parts, in virtue of which logicians called an idea distinct, that is, clarified by analysis of just what elements make the given idea applicable. Elsewhere, echoing Kant, Peirce calls such a definition "nominal" (CP 5.553).
3. Clearness in virtue of clearness of conceivable practical implications of the object's effects as conceived of, such as can lead to fruitful reasoning, especially on difficult problems. Here he introduces that which he later called the pragmatic maxim.

By way of example of how to clarify conceptions, he addressed conceptions about truth and the real as questions of the presuppositions of reasoning in general. To reason is to presuppose (and at least to hope), as a principle of the reasoner's self-regulation, that the truth is independent of our vagaries of opinion and is discoverable. In clearness's second grade (the "nominal" grade), he defines truth as the correspondence of a sign (in particular, a proposition) to its object, and the real as the object (be it a possibility or quality, or an actuality or brute fact, or a necessity or norm or law) to which a true sign corresponds, such that truth and the real are independent of that which you or I or any actual, definite community of inquirers think. After that needful but confined step, next in clearness's third grade (the pragmatic, practice-oriented grade) he defines truth — not as actual consensus, such that to inquire would be to poll the experts — but as that which would be reached, sooner or later but still inevitably, by research taken far enough, such that the real does depend on that ideal final opinion—a dependence to which he appeals in theoretical arguments elsewhere, for instance for the long-run validity of the rule of induction. (Peirce held that one cannot have absolute theoretical assurance of having actually reached the truth, and later said that the confession of inaccuracy and one-sidedness is an essential ingredient of a true abstract statement.) Peirce argues that even to argue against the independence and discoverability of truth and the real is to presuppose that there is, about that very question under argument, a truth with just such independence and discoverability. For more on Peirce's theory of truth, see the Peirce section in Pragmatic theory of truth. Peirce's discussions and definitions of truth have influenced several epistemic truth theorists and been used as foil for deflationary and correspondence theories of truth.

Peirce said that a conception's meaning consists in "all general modes of rational conduct" implied by "acceptance" of the conception—that is, if one were to accept, first of all, the conception as true, then what could one conceive to be consequent general modes of rational conduct by all who accept the conception as true?—the whole of such consequent general modes is the whole meaning. His pragmatism, since a conception is general, does not equate a conception's meaning, its intellectual purport, with any definite set of actual consequences or upshots corroborating or undermining the conception or its worth, nor does it equate its meaning, much less its truth (if it is true), with the conceived or actual benefit or cost of the conception itself, like a meme (or, say, propaganda), outside the perspective of its being true in what it purports. If it is true, its truth is not transitory but instead immutable and independent of actual trends of opinion. His pragmatism also bears no resemblance to "vulgar" pragmatism, which misleadingly connotes a ruthless and Machiavellian search for mercenary or political advantage. Rather, Peirce's pragmatic maxim is the heart of his pragmatism as a method of experimentational mental reflection arriving at conceptions in terms of conceivable confirmatory and disconfirmatory circumstances—a method hospitable to the generation of explanatory hypotheses, and conducive to the employment and improvement of verification to test the truth of putative knowledge.

Peirce's pragmatism, as method and theory of definitions and the clearness of ideas, is a department within his theory of inquiry, which he variously called "Methodeutic" and "Philosophical or Speculative Rhetoric". He applied his pragmatism as a method throughout his work.

Peirce called his pragmatism "the logic of abduction", that is, the logic of inference to explanatory hypotheses. As a method conducive to hypotheses as well as predictions and testing, pragmatism leads beyond the usual duo of foundational alternatives, namely:

- Deduction from self-evident truths, or rationalism;

- Induction from experiential phenomena, or empiricism.

His approach is distinct from foundationalism, empiricist or otherwise, as well as from coherentism, by the following three dimensions:

- Active process of theory generation, with no prior assurance of truth;

- Subsequent application of the contingent theory in order to clarify its logical and practical implications;

- Testing and evaluation of the provisional theory's utility for the anticipation of future experience, and that in dual senses of the word: prediction and control. Peirce's appreciation of these three dimensions serves to flesh out a physiognomy of inquiry far more solid than the flatter image of inductive generalization simpliciter, which is merely the relabeling of phenomenological patterns. Peirce's pragmatism was the first time the scientific method was proposed as an epistemology for philosophical questions.

A theory that proves itself more successful than its rivals in predicting and controlling our world is said to be nearer the truth. This is an operational notion of truth employed by scientists.

In "The Fixation of Belief", Peirce characterized inquiry in general not as the pursuit of truth per se but as the struggle to settle disturbances or conflicts of belief, irritating, inhibitory doubts, belief being that on which one is willing to act. That let Peirce frame scientific inquiry not only as a special kind of inquiry in a broader spectrum, but also, like inquiry generally, as based on actual doubts, not mere verbal doubts (such as hyperbolic doubt), which he held to be fruitless, and it let him also frame it, by the same stroke, as requiring that proof rest on propositions free from actual doubt, rather than on ultimate and absolutely indubitable propositions. He outlined four methods, ordered from least to most successful in achieving a secure fixation of belief:

1. The method of tenacity (policy of sticking to initial belief) — which brings comforts and decisiveness, but leads to trying to ignore contrary information and others' views, as if truth were intrinsically private, not public. The method goes against the social impulse and easily falters since one may well fail to avoid noticing when another's opinion is as good as one's own initial opinion. Its successes can be brilliant but tend to be transitory.
2. The method of authority — which overcomes disagreements but sometimes brutally. Its successes can be majestic and long-lasting, but it cannot regulate people thoroughly enough to suppress doubts indefinitely, especially when people learn about other societies present and past.
3. The method of the a priori — which promotes conformity less brutally but fosters opinions as something like tastes, arising in conversation and comparisons of perspectives in terms of "what is agreeable to reason." Thereby it depends on fashion in paradigms and goes in circles over time. It is more intellectual and respectable but, like the first two methods, sustains accidental and capricious beliefs, destining some minds to doubt it.
4. The method of science — the only one whereby inquiry can, by its own account, go wrong (fallibilism), and purposely tests itself and criticizes, corrects, and improves itself.

Peirce held that, in practical affairs, slow and stumbling ratiocination is often dangerously inferior to instinct and traditional sentiment, and that the scientific method is best suited to theoretical research, which in turn should not be bound to the other methods and to practical ends; reason's "first rule" is that, in order to learn, one must desire to learn and, as a corollary, must not block the way of inquiry. What recommends the scientific method of inquiry above all others is that it is deliberately designed to arrive, eventually, at the ultimately most secure beliefs, upon which the most successful practices can eventually be based. Starting from the idea that people seek not truth per se but instead to subdue irritating, inhibitory doubt, Peirce shows how, through the struggle, some can come to submit to truth, seek as truth the guidance of potential practice correctly to its given goal, and wed themselves to the scientific method.

== Pragmaticism's name ==
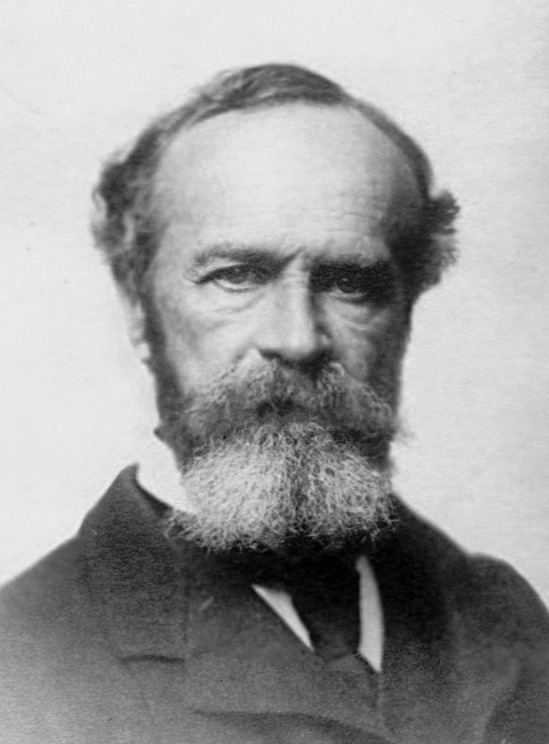
William James 1842–1910

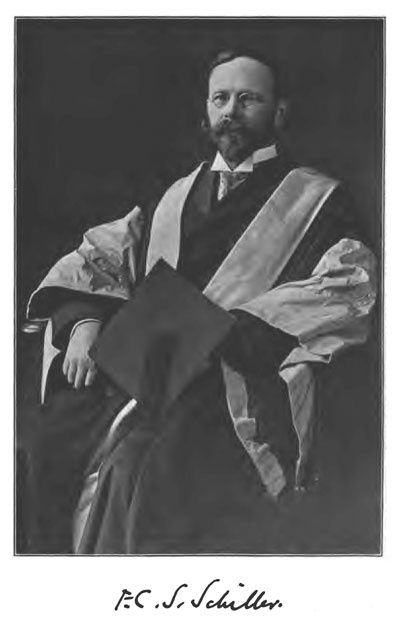
F. C. S. Schiller 1863–1937

It is sometimes stated that James' and other philosophers' use of the word pragmatism so dismayed Peirce that he renamed his own variant pragmaticism. Susan Haack has disagreed, pointing out the context in which Peirce publicly introduced the latter term in 1905. Haack's excerpt of Peirce begins below at the words "But at present ...," and continues with some ellipses. The fuller excerpt below supports her case further:

[The] word "pragmatism" has gained general recognition in a generalised sense that seems to argue power of growth and vitality. The famed psychologist, James, first took it up, seeing that his "radical empiricism" substantially answered to the writer's definition of pragmatism, albeit with a certain difference in the point of view. Next, the admirably clear and brilliant thinker, Mr. Ferdinand C. S. Schiller, casting about for a more attractive name for the "anthropomorphism" of his Riddle of the Sphinx, lit, in that most remarkable paper of his on Axioms as Postulates, upon the same designation "pragmatism," which in its original sense was in generic agreement with his own doctrine, for which he has since found the more appropriate specification "humanism," while he still retains "pragmatism" in a somewhat wider sense. So far all went happily. But at present, the word begins to be met with occasionally in the literary journals, where it gets abused in the merciless way that words have to expect when they fall into literary clutches. Sometimes the manners of the British have effloresced in scolding at the word as ill-chosen, —ill-chosen, that is, to express some meaning that it was rather designed to exclude. So then, the writer, finding his bantling "pragmatism" so promoted, feels that it is time to kiss his child good-by and relinquish it to its higher destiny; while to serve the precise purpose of expressing the original definition, he begs to announce the birth of the word "pragmaticism", which is ugly enough to be safe from kidnappers.

Then, in a surviving draft letter to Calderoni, dated by the CP editors as circa that same year 1905, Peirce said regarding his above-quoted discussion:

In the April number of the Monist I proposed that the word 'pragmatism' should hereafter be used somewhat loosely to signify affiliation with Schiller, James, Dewey, Royce, and the rest of us, while the particular doctrine which I invented the word to denote, which is your first kind of pragmatism, should be called 'pragmaticism.' The extra syllable will indicate the narrower meaning.

Indeed in the Monist article Peirce had said that the coinage "pragmaticism" was intended "to serve the precise purpose of expressing the original definition". Of course this does not mean that Peirce regarded his fellow pragmatist philosophers as word-kidnappers. To the contrary he had said, regarding James's and Schiller's uses of the word "pragmatism": "So far, all went happily." So it would seem that Peirce intended the coinage "pragmaticism" for two distinguishable purposes: (1) protection from literary journals and word-kidnappers, and (2) reference strictly to his own form of pragmatism, as opposed even to other pragmatisms that had not moved him to the new name. In the letter to Calderoni, Peirce did not reject all significant affiliation with fellow pragmatists, and instead said "the rest of us". Nor did he reject all such affiliation in later discussions.

However, in the following year 1906, in a manuscript "A Sketch of Logical Critics", Peirce wrote:

I have always fathered my pragmaticism (as I have called it since James and Schiller made the word [pragmatism] imply "the will to believe," the mutability of truth, the soundness of Zeno's refutation of motion, and pluralism generally), upon Kant, Berkeley, and Leibniz. ...

(Peirce proceeded to criticize J. S. Mill but acknowledged probable aid from Mill's Examination.)

Then, in 1908, in his article "A Neglected Argument for the Reality of God", mentioning both James and the journalist, pragmatist, and literary author Giovanni Papini, Peirce wrote:

In 1871, in a Metaphysical Club in Cambridge, Mass., I used to preach this principle as a sort of logical gospel, representing the unformulated method followed by Berkeley, and in conversation about it I called it "Pragmatism." In December 1877 and January 1878 I set forth the doctrine in the Popular Science Monthly, and the two parts of my essay were printed in French in the Revue Philosophique, volumes vi. and vii. Of course, the doctrine attracted no particular attention, for, as I had remarked in my opening sentence, very few people care for logic. But in 1897 Professor James remodelled the matter, and transmogrified it into a doctrine of philosophy, some parts of which I highly approved, while other and more prominent parts I regarded, and still regard, as opposed to sound logic. About the time Professor Papini discovered, to the delight of the Pragmatist school, that this doctrine was incapable of definition, which would certainly seem to distinguish it from every other doctrine in whatever branch of science, I was coming to the conclusion that my poor little maxim should be called by another name; and accordingly, in April 1905, I renamed it Pragmaticism.

Peirce proceeded in "A Neglected Argument" to express both deep satisfaction and deep dismay with his fellow pragmatists. He singled F. C. S. Schiller out by name and was vague about which among the others he most particularly referred to. Peirce wrote "It seems to me a pity they should allow a philosophy so instinct with life to become infected with seeds of death. ... "

Peirce remained allied with them about:
- the reality of generals and habits, to be understood, as are hypostatic abstractions, in terms of potential concrete effects even if unactualized;
- the falsity of necessitarianism;
- the character of consciousness as only "visceral or other external sensation".
but was dismayed with their "angry hatred of strict logic" and saw seeds of philosophical death in:
- their view that "truth is mutable";
- their view that infinity is unreal; and
- "such confusions of thought as of active willing (willing to control thought, to doubt, and to weigh reasons) with willing not to exert the will (willing to believe)".

There has been some controversy over Peirce's relation to other pragmatists over the years and over the question of what is owed to Peirce, with visible crests in titles such as literary essayist Edward Dahlberg's "Cutpurse Philosopher" about James, in which Dahlberg claimed that Peirce had "tombstone reticences" about making accusations, and Kenneth Laine Ketner's and Walker Percy's A Thief of Peirce, in which Percy described himself as "a thief of Peirce" (page 130). Meanwhile, Schiller, James's wife Alice, and James's son Henry James III believed that James had a habit of overstating his intellectual debts to others such as Peirce.

In another manuscript "A Sketch of Logical Critic" dated by the CP editors as 1911, Peirce discussed one of Zeno's paradoxes, that of Achilles and the Tortoise, in terms of James's and others' difficulties with it. Peirce therein expressed regret at having used a "contemptuous" manner about such difficulties in his 1903 Harvard lectures on pragmatism (which James had arranged), and said of James, who had died in August 1910: "Nobody has a better right to testify to the morality of his attitude toward his own thoughts than I, who knew and loved him for forty-nine or fifty years. But owing to his almost unexampled incapacity for mathematical thought, combined with intense hatred for logic — probably for its pedantry, its insistence on minute exactitude — the gêne of its barbarous formulations, etc. rendered him an easy victim to Zeno and the Achilles. ... ", called James "about as perfect a lover of truth as it is possible for a man to be. ... " and said: "In speaking, then, of William James as I do, I am saying the most that I could of any man's intellectual morality; and with him this was but one of a whole diadem of virtues."

== See also ==
- Charles Sanders Peirce bibliography
- Entitative graph
- Existential graph
- Hypostatic abstraction
- Inquiry
- Logical graph
- Philosophy of mathematics
- Philosophy of science
- Pragmatic maxim
- Pragmatic theory of truth
- Scientific method
- Semeiotic
- Sign relation
- Truth theory

== References and further reading ==
- Peirce, C. S. (1877–1878), "Illustrations of the Logic of Science" (series), Popular Science Monthly vols. 12–13. (Includes "The Fixation of Belief" and "How to Make Our Ideas Clear".)
- Peirce, C. S.; James, William; Baldwin, James Mark; and Seth, James (1902), "Pragmatic (1) and (2) Pragmatism" in Dictionary of Philosophy and Psychology, v. 2, James Mark Baldwin, ed., MacMillan, New York and London, pp. 321–323.
- Peirce, C. S. (1905), "What Pragmatism Is", The Monist, vol. XV, no. 2, pp. 161–181, The Open Court Publishing Co., Chicago, IL, April 1905, for the Hegeler Institute. Reprinted in Collected Papers (CP) v. 5, paragraphs 411–437 and Charles S. Peirce: Selected Writings 180–202. Arisbe Eprint.
- Peirce, C. S. (1905), "Issues of Pragmaticism", The Monist, vol. XV, no. 4, pp. 481–499, The Open Court Publishing Co., Chicago, IL, October 1905, for the Hegeler Institute. Reprinted in CP v. 5, paragraphs 438–463 and Charles S. Peirce: Selected Writings 203–226. Google Books (with a few botched pages) Eprint. Internet Archive Eprint.
- Peirce, C. S. (1906), "Prolegomena To an Apology For Pragmaticism", The Monist, vol. XVI, no. 4, pp. 492–546, The Open Court Publishing Co., Chicago, IL, October 1906, for the Hegeler Institute. Reprinted in CP v. 4, paragraphs 530–572 and Peirce on Signs: Writings on Semiotic 249–252. Eprint.
- Peirce, C. S. (1908), "A Neglected Argument for the Reality of God", published in part, Hibbert Journal vol. 7, pp. 90–112. Reprinted including one or another unpublished part in CP v. 6, paragraphs 452–485, Charles S. Peirce: Selected Writings 358–379, Essential Peirce v. 2, 434–450, and Peirce on Signs: Writings on Semiotic 260–278. Eprint.

Peirce collections

- Peirce, C.S. (1931–35, 1958), Collected Papers of Charles Sanders Peirce, vols. 1–6, 1931–35, Charles Hartshorne and Paul Weiss, eds., vols. 7–8, 1958, Arthur W. Burks, ed., Harvard University Press, Cambridge, Massachusetts. In print from HUP and online via InteLex.
- Peirce, C.S (1976), The New Elements of Mathematics by Charles S. Peirce, 4 volumes in 5, Carolyn Eisele, ed., Mouton Publishers, The Hague, Netherlands, 1976. Humanities Press, Atlantic Highlands, New Jersey. Out of print.
- Peirce, C.S. (1981–), Writings of Charles S. Peirce, A Chronological Edition, vols. 1–6 & 8, of a projected 30, Peirce Edition Project, eds., Indiana University Press, Bloomington and Indianapolis, Indiana. In print from IUP and online (first six volumes) via InteLex.
- Peirce, C.S. (1992), Pragmatism as a Principle and Method of Right Thinking: The 1903 Harvard "Lectures on Pragmatism", Patricia Ann Turisi, ed., State University of New York Press, Albany, NY, 1997. In print from SUNY. A study edition of Peirce's lecture manuscripts, including unused drafts, which had been previously published in abridged form.
- Peirce, C.S. (1992, 1998), The Essential Peirce, Selected Philosophical Writings, Volume 1 (1867–1893), 1992, Nathan Houser and Christian Kloesel, eds., and Volume 2 (1893–1913) including the 1903 lectures on pragmatism, 1998, Peirce Edition Project, eds., Bloomington and Indianapolis, Indiana: Indiana University Press. In print from IUP.

Other

- Apel, Karl-Otto (1981), Charles S. Peirce: From Pragmatism to Pragmaticism, 288 pages, University of Massachusetts Press, hardcover (October 1981) (ISBN 978-0870231773, ISBN 0-87023-177-4), reprinted, Humanities Press Intl (August 1995), paperback (ISBN 978-0391038950, ISBN 0-391-03895-8).
- Atkin, Albert (2006), "C.S. Peirce's Pragmatism" in the Internet Encyclopedia of Philosophy. Eprint
- Dewey, John (1916), "The Pragmatism of Peirce" in The Journal of Philosophy, Psychology, and Scientific Methods, v. 13, n. 26, December, 709–715. Google Books eprint, but much of p. 714 is missing. Reprinted or adapted in Peirce, C. S., Chance, Love, and Logic: Philosophical Essays, Morris Raphael Cohen, ed., 1923, still in print.
- Fisch, Max, (1986), Peirce, Semeiotic, and Pragmatism, Ketner, Kenneth Laine, and Kloesel, Christian J. W., eds., Indiana University Press: catalog page, Bloomington, IN, 1986, 480 pages, cloth (ISBN 978-0-253-34317-8, ISBN 0-253-34317-8).
- Hookway, Christopher (2000, 2003), Truth, Rationality, and Pragmatism: Themes from Peirce, Oxford University Press, USA, 328 pages, hardcover (ISBN 978-0198238362, ISBN 0-19-823836-3), new edition 2003: O.U.P. catalog page, 328 pages, paperback (ISBN 978-0199256587, ISBN 0-19-925658-6).
- Lane, Robert (2007), "Peirce's Modal Shift: From Set Theory to Pragmaticism", Journal of the History of Philosophy, v. 45, n. 4, Oct. 2007.
- Misak, Cheryl J. (1991), Truth and the End of Inquiry : A Peircean Account of Truth, Oxford University Press (catalog page), Oxford, UK; 2004 paperback 232 pages (ISBN 978-0-19-927059-0).
- Nubiola, Jaime (1996), "C. S. Peirce: Pragmatism and Logicism", Philosophia Scientiae I/2, 121-130. Eprint.
- Shook, John R., and Margolis, Joseph, eds. (2006), A Companion to Pragmatism, Blackwell (now Wiley), Malden, MA, 431 pages, hardcover (ISBN 978-1405116213, ISBN 1-4051-1621-8) Blackwell catalog page.
- Skagestad, Peter (1981), The Road of Inquiry, Charles Peirce's Pragmatic Realism, Columbia University Press: catalog page, New York, NY, 261 pages, cloth (ISBN 0-231-05004-6)
