= Pragmatic maxim =

Maxim of logic formulated by Charles Sanders Peirce

The pragmatic maxim, also known as the maxim of pragmatism or the maxim of pragmaticism, is a maxim of logic formulated by Charles Sanders Peirce. Serving as a normative recommendation or a regulative principle in the normative science of logic, its function is to guide the conduct of thought toward the achievement of its purpose, advising on an optimal way of "attaining clearness of apprehension". Here is its original 1878 statement in English when it was not yet named:

It appears, then, that the rule for attaining the third grade of clearness of apprehension is as follows: Consider what effects, that might conceivably have practical bearings, we conceive the object of our conception to have. Then, our conception of these effects is the whole of our conception of the object.

(Peirce on p. 293 of "How to Make Our Ideas Clear", Popular Science Monthly, v. 12, pp. 286–302. Reprinted widely, including Collected Papers of Charles Sanders Peirce (CP) v. 5, paragraphs 388–410.)

== Seven ways of looking at the pragmatic maxim ==
Peirce stated the pragmatic maxim in many different ways over the years, each of which adds its own bit of clarity or correction to their collective corpus.

- The first excerpt appears in the form of a dictionary entry, intended as a definition of pragmatism as an opinion favoring application of the pragmatic maxim as a recommendation about how to clarify meaning.

Pragmatism. The opinion that metaphysics is to be largely cleared up by the application of the following maxim for attaining clearness of apprehension: Consider what effects, that might conceivably have practical bearings, we conceive the object of our conception to have. Then, our conception of these effects is the whole of our conception of the object.

(Peirce, 1902, "Pragmatic and Pragmatism" in the Dictionary of Philosophy and Psychology, including quote of himself from 1878, "How to Make Our Ideas Clear" in Popular Science Monthly v. 12, pp. 286–302. Reprinted in CP 5.2).

- The second excerpt presents the pragmatic maxim (with added emphases on forms of the word "conceive") as a recommendation to you, the addressee, on how you can clarify your conception, then restates it in the indicative, in a way that emphasizes the generalism of pragmatism:

Pragmaticism was originally enounced in the form of a maxim, as follows: Consider what effects that might conceivably have practical bearings you conceive the objects of your conception to have. Then, your conception of those effects is the whole of your conception of the object.

I will restate this in other words, since ofttimes one can thus eliminate some unsuspected source of perplexity to the reader. This time it shall be in the indicative mood, as follows: The entire intellectual purport of any symbol consists in the total of all general modes of rational conduct which, conditionally upon all the possible different circumstances and desires, would ensue upon the acceptance of the symbol.

(Peirce, 1905, from "Issues of Pragmaticism" in The Monist v. XV, n. 4, pp. 481–499, see p. 481 via Google Books and via Internet Archive. Reprinted in CP 5.438.).

- The third excerpt puts a gloss on the meaning of a practical bearing and provides an alternative statement of the maxim. Such reasoning, and all reasonings turn upon the idea that one who exerts certain kinds of volition will undergo, in return, certain compulsory perceptions. Now this sort of consideration—that certain lines of conduct entail certain kinds of inevitable experiences—is called a practical consideration. This justifies the maxim as a practical belief, that:

To ascertain the meaning of an intellectual conception one should consider what practical consequences might result from the truth of that conception—and the sum of these consequences constitute the entire meaning of the conception.

(Peirce, 1905, CP 5.9.)

- The fourth excerpt illustrates one of Peirce's many attempts to get the sense of the pragmatic philosophy across by rephrasing the pragmatic maxim. Introducing this version, he addresses prospective critics who do not believe a simple heuristic maxim, much less one that concerns itself with a routine matter of logical procedure, forms a sufficient basis for a whole philosophy. He suggests they might feel he makes pragmatism "a mere maxim of logic instead of a sublime principle of speculative philosophy." For better philosophical standing, he endeavors to put pragmatism into the same form of a philosophical theorem:

Pragmatism is the principle that every theoretical judgment expressible in a sentence in the indicative mood is a confused form of thought whose only meaning, if it has any, lies in its tendency to enforce a corresponding practical maxim expressible as a conditional sentence having its apodosis in the imperative mood.

(Peirce, 1903, from the lectures on Pragmatism, CP 5.18, also in Pragmatism as a Principle and Method of Right Thinking: The 1903 Harvard 'Lectures on Pragmatism', p. 110, and in Essential Peirce v. 2, pp. 134–135.)

- The fifth excerpt is useful by way of additional clarification, and is aimed to correct a variety of historical misunderstandings that arose with regard to the intended meaning of the pragmatic maxim. For a source of such misunderstanding, Peirce points to his younger self (but will retract the confession as itself mistaken—see the seventh excerpt).

The doctrine appears to assume that the end of man is action—a stoical axiom which, to the present writer at the age of sixty, does not recommend itself so forcibly as it did at thirty. If it be admitted, on the contrary, that action wants an end, and that that end must be something of a general description, then the spirit of the maxim itself, which is that we must look to the upshot of our concepts in order rightly to apprehend them, would direct us towards something different from practical facts, namely, to general ideas, as the true interpreters of our thought.

(Peirce, 1902, from "Pragmatic and Pragmatism" in the Dictionary of Philosophy and Psychology. Reprinted CP 5.3, 1902).

- A sixth excerpt is useful in stating the bearing of the pragmatic maxim on the topic of reflection, namely, that it makes all of pragmatism boil down to nothing more or less than a method of reflection.

The study of philosophy consists, therefore, in reflexion, and pragmatism is that method of reflexion which is guided by constantly holding in view its purpose and the purpose of the ideas it analyzes, whether these ends be of the nature and uses of action or of thought. It will be seen that pragmatism is not a Weltanschauung but is a method of reflexion having for its purpose to render ideas clear.

(Peirce, 1902, CP 5.13 note 1).

- The seventh excerpt is a late reflection on the reception of pragmatism. With a sense of exasperation that is almost palpable, Peirce tries to justify the maxim of pragmatism and to correct its misreadings by pinpointing a number of false impressions that the intervening years have piled on it, and he attempts once more to prescribe against the deleterious effects of these mistakes. Recalling the very conception and birth of pragmatism, he reviews its initial promise and its intended lot in the light of its subsequent vicissitudes and its apparent fate. Adopting the style of a post mortem analysis, he presents a veritable autopsy of the ways that the main idea of pragmatism, for all its practicality, can be murdered by a host of misdissecting disciplinarians, by what are ostensibly its most devoted followers. He proceeds here (1906) to retract a philosophical confession—in the fifth excerpt (above)—which he wrote in 1902 about his 1878 original presentation of pragmatism.

This employment five times over of derivates of concipere must then have had a purpose. In point of fact it had two. One was to show that I was speaking of meaning in no other sense than that of intellectual purport. The other was to avoid all danger of being understood as attempting to explain a concept by percepts, images, schemata, or by anything but concepts. I did not, therefore, mean to say that acts, which are more strictly singular than anything, could constitute the purport, or adequate proper interpretation, of any symbol. I compared action to the finale of the symphony of thought, belief being a demicadence. Nobody conceives that the few bars at the end of a musical movement are the purpose of the movement. They may be called its upshot. But the figure obviously would not bear detailed application. I only mention it to show that the suspicion I myself expressed after a too hasty rereading of the forgotten magazine paper, that it expressed a stoic, that is, a nominalistic, materialistic, and utterly philistine state of thought, was quite mistaken.

(Peirce, 1906, CP 5.402 note 3).
