= Ternary relation =

Relation of degree three

In mathematics, a ternary relation or triadic relation is a finitary relation in which the number of places in the relation is three. Ternary relations may also be referred to as 3-adic, 3-ary, 3-dimensional, or 3-place.

Just as a binary relation is formally defined as a set of pairs, i.e. a subset of the Cartesian product A × B of some sets A and B, so a ternary relation is a set of triples, forming a subset of the Cartesian product A × B × C of three sets A, B and C.

An example of a ternary relation in elementary geometry involves triples of points. In this case, a triple (A,B,C) is in the relation if the three points are collinear—that is, they lie on the same straight line. Another geometric example of a ternary relation considers triples consisting of two points and a line. Here, a triple (A,B,ℓ) belongs to the relation if the line ℓ passes through both points A and B; in other words, if the two points determine or are incident with the line.

== Examples ==
=== Binary functions ===
A function f : A × B → C in two variables, mapping two values from sets A and B, respectively, to a value in C associates to every pair (a,b) in A × B an element f(a, b) in C. Therefore, its graph consists of pairs of the form ((a, b), f(a, b)). Such pairs in which the first element is itself a pair are often identified with triples. This makes the graph of f a ternary relation between A, B and C, consisting of all triples (a, b, f(a, b)), satisfying a in A, b in B, and f(a, b) in C.

=== Cyclic orders ===
Given any set A whose elements are arranged on a circle, one can define a ternary relation R on A, i.e. a subset of A^{3} = A × A × A, by stipulating that R(a, b, c) holds if and only if the elements a, b and c are pairwise different and when going from a to c in a clockwise direction one passes through b. For example, if A = { 1, 2, 3, 4, 5, 6, 7, 8, 9, 10, 11, 12 } represents the hours on a clock face, then R(8, 12, 4) holds and R(12, 8, 4) does not hold.

=== Congruence relation ===
The ordinary congruence of arithmetics

$$a \equiv b \pmod{m}$$

which holds for three integers a, b, and m if and only if m divides a − b, formally may be considered as a ternary relation. However, usually, this instead is considered as a family of binary relations between the a and the b, indexed by the modulus m. For each fixed m, indeed this binary relation has some natural properties, like being an equivalence relation; while the combined ternary relation in general is not studied as one relation.

=== Typing relation ===
A typing relation Γ ⊢ e:σ indicates that e is a term of type σ in context Γ, and is thus a ternary relation between contexts, terms and types.

=== Schröder rules ===
Given homogeneous relations A, B, and C on a set, a ternary relation (A, B, C) can be defined using composition of relations AB and inclusion AB ⊆ C. Within the calculus of relations each relation A has a converse relation A^{T} and a complement relation A̅. Using these involutions, Augustus De Morgan and Ernst Schröder showed that (A, B, C) is equivalent to (C̅, B^{T}, A̅) and also equivalent to (A^{T}, C̅, B̅). The mutual equivalences of these forms, constructed from the ternary relation (A, B, C), are called the Schröder rules.
