= Charles Santiago Sanders Peirce =

American philosopher, logician, mathematician, and scientist

Charles Santiago Sanders Peirce was the adopted name of Charles Sanders Peirce (September 10, 1839 – April 19, 1914), an American philosopher, logician, mathematician, and scientist. Peirce's name appeared in print as "Charles Santiago Peirce" as early as 1890. Starting in 1906 he used "Santiago" in many of his own articles. There is no well-documented explanation of why Peirce adopted the middle name "Santiago" (Spanish for Saint James) but speculations and beliefs of contemporaries and scholars focused on his gratitude to his old friend William James and more recently on Peirce's second wife Juliette (of unknown but possibly Spanish Gypsy heritage).

== The stories and the evidence ==
Peirce in his later years became impoverished. It has been said (see below) that Peirce's motive for adopting "Santiago"—"St. James" in Spanish—as a middle name was gratitude to his old friend William James, who dedicated his Will to Believe and Other Essays in Popular Philosophy (1897) to Peirce, and arranged for Peirce during this period to be paid to give two series of lectures at or near Harvard—one in 1898, one of two in 1903. Then in 1907 James dedicated his Pragmatism to the nominalist John Stuart Mill and omitted Peirce from its list of references for further reading—yet also in that book (in Lecture 2, fourth paragraph) James credits Peirce as the originator of pragmatism. By that time, Peirce was already distinguishing his own scholastic realist brand of pragmatism as "pragmaticism". Still, Peirce had increasing reason for gratitude. Each year from 1907 until James's death in 1910, James wrote to his friends in the Boston intelligentsia, asking that they contribute financially to help support Peirce, a fund which continued after James's death. Peirce reciprocated by designating James's eldest son as his heir should Juliette predecease him.

The claim that Peirce adopted the middle name "Santiago" in gratitude to William James goes back at least to William James's wife Alice, quoted in 1927 by F. C. S. Schiller

In one of the last quinquennial catalogues, Peirce changed his middle name from Saunders to Santiago. It was long before I understood that it was a way of calling himself St. James, but there it stands Charles Santiago Peirce.

In Quinquennial Catalogue of the Officers and Graduates of Harvard University, Peirce appears as "Charles Sanders Peirce" in 1890, 1895, 1900, and 1905. He appears as "Charles Santiago Sanders Peirce," "Charles S. Sanders Peirce," "Charles Sanders Peirce", in 1910 and 1915.

Collected Papers of Charles Sanders Peirce (CP), Volume 5 in 1934 reprinted a comment by Peirce "Mr. Peterson's Proposed Discussion" complete with the name "Charles Santiago Sanders Peirce" appended, first published in The Monist in 1906. The CP editors (Charles Hartshorne and Paul Weiss) added in a footnote, "The additional name Santiago, St. James in Spanish, was adopted by Peirce about this time, apparently in honor of his life-long friend, William James." Weiss also said much the same in the Peirce entry in the Dictionary of American Biography, Volume 14, pp. 398–403 (see p. 400), in 1934. In 1935 Ralph Barton Perry wrote in The Thought and Character of William James, v. 2, p. 436, that Peirce adopted "Santiago" as a name "presumably in honor of James".

Others followed with the same idea expressed less conditionally, for example Peter Skagestad in The Road of Inquiry, 1981, p. 234: "After James' death in 1910, Peirce began signing his own name Charles Santiago Sanders Peirce, thereby canonizing his old friend 'Santiago,' i.e. St. James"; John Deely in the editorial introduction, dated 1994, to the CP electronic edition: "Charles S. Peirce (the 'S' stands for 'Sanders' by Baptism and later for 'Santiago' as Charles' way of honoring William James)...."; James Hoopes in Community Denied, 1998, p. 30: "Peirce responded gracefully to James's aid and even adopted in old age the name "Santiago" (Saint James) as a tribute to his benefactor"; and Joseph Brent in Charles Sanders Peirce: A Life, 2nd ed. 1998, pp. 315–16, indicating the same connection, saying that Peirce took the name "Santiago" in May 1909, and adding an endnote: "MS 318".

Timeline
- 1890, 1891, 1892: Peirce mentioned in print as "Charles Santiago Peirce".
- 1897: James dedicates Will to Believe to Peirce.
- 1898: James arranges Peirce's February 10 – March 7 Cambridge, Mass. lecture series. In August, James credits Peirce for the idea and name of pragmatism.
- 1900: Peirce in a letter asks James whether it was himself or James who coined the name pragmatism, and who first used it in print and when. James replies that Peirce coined it and that James publicly credited him in 1898.
- 1903: James arranges Peirce's Harvard lectures series on pragmatism. Sedgwick follows by arranging Peirce's Lowell lecture series later the same year.
- 1906 January: Peirce begins signing his Monist articles "Charles Santiago Sanders Peirce": January & October 1906; April ("Charles S. S. Peirce") & July 1908; and January 1909.
- 1907 January: James begins annual fundraising drive for Peirce.
- 1907 June: James's book Pragmatism is published with a dedication to the nominalist Mills and omits Peirce from list for further reading; but credits pragmatism's origin to Peirce.
- 1907 September: Peirce designates James's eldest son as heir should Juliette predecease Peirce.
- 1910 August: James dies. Peirce fund continues.

But Peirce was mentioned in print as Charles Santiago Peirce in 1890, 1891, and 1892, years before James's publicizing him and helping him to get lectures and funds. Kenneth Laine Ketner (1998, p. 280) cited the 1890 case (and credited Joseph Ransdell for bringing it to his attention) of the heading "Peirce, Charles S(antiago)", which stood above a list of 15 well known C. S. Peirce papers in 11 publications starting on p. 710 in the bibliography for Volume 1 of Ernst Schröder's Vorlesungen über die Algebra der Logik (1890). See also for example p. 65 of the Jahrbuch über die Fortschritte der Mathematik, v. XXIV for 1892, published 1895.

It also came to light that the mathematician Ventura Reyes y Prósper referred to Peirce's middle name as "Santiago" in letters and two papers (1891 and 1892) and wrote in a footnote to the 1892 paper: "Although it may seem strange, his first name is in English and his second is in Spanish; I do not know why." For the letters and papers, see Jaime Nubiola and Jesús Cobo, "The Spanish Mathematician Ventura Reyes Prósper and his connections with Charles S. Peirce and Christine Ladd-Franklin"

Joseph Brent (author of Charles Sanders Peirce: A Life (1993, 1998), history professor emeritus, University of the District of Columbia) claimed to have found, in Manuscript 318, Peirce explaining his motive as being to honor William James, but other scholars did not find it there; Brent suspected a mixup across manuscript numbering systems. The Peirce manuscript material comes to more than 100,000 pages. The claim of a "Santiago"-James connection had long been uncontroversial. The possibility remains that Peirce in effect revived his (earlier adopted) middle name "Santiago" during some later years (see below) in gratitude to James; but no confirmatory manuscript or publication has been brought to light.

In Manuscript 1611 (1903), in a biographical form for a manuscript directory and a biographical dictionary of the Men of Science in the United States, Peirce wrote:

(I am variously listed in print as Charles Santiago Peirce, Charles Saunders Peirce, and Charles Sanders Peirce. Under the circumstances a noncommittal S. suits me best)

(Peirce authored the entry "Peirce, C(harles) S" (except for the notability star supplied by the editor) in American Men of Science, 1906, first edition, sometimes called Volume 1, p. 248. In the 1910 second edition, it became "Peirce, C(harles) S(antiago Sanders)"; see below.)

In publications of his own articles, Peirce began using "Santiago" in 1906, when he used "Santiago Sanders"—both middle names together—in his The Monist articles; but not in his 1908 Hibbert Journal article (nor in some other publications at the time):

- In 1906 in The Monist v. XVI, n. 1, January, "Mr. Peterson's Proposed Discussion", p. 151.
- In 1906 in The Monist v. XVI (misprinted "VI"), n. 4, October, "Prolegomena To an Apology For Pragmaticism", p. 546.
- In 1908 in The Monist v. XVIII, n. 2, April, "Some Amazing Mazes" p. 241 ("Charles S. S. Peirce").
- In 1908 in The Monist v. XVIII, n. 3, July, "Some Amazing Mazes (Conclusion), Explanation of Curiosity the First", p. 461.
- In 1908 in Hibbert Journal v. VII, n. 1, October, "A Neglected Argument for the Reality of God": "C. S. Peirce" on pp. 90 & 112.
- in 1909 in The Monist v. XIX, n. 1, January, "Some Amazing Mazes, A Second Curiosity", p. 45.
- in 1910 in American Men of Science, 2nd edition (sometimes called "Volume 2"), "Peirce, C(harles) S(antiago Sanders)", p. 364.

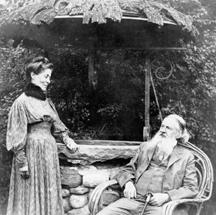
Juliette and Charles by the well at their home, Arisbe, in 1907.

Paul Carus, editor of The Monist during those years, called Peirce "Charles S. S. Peirce" in 1910 in "On the Nature of Logical and Mathematical Thought", The Monist, v. XX, no. 1, pp. 33–75, on p. 43 and p. 45, and again in "Non-Aristotelian Logic", The Monist, v. XX, no. 1 on pp. 158 and 159.

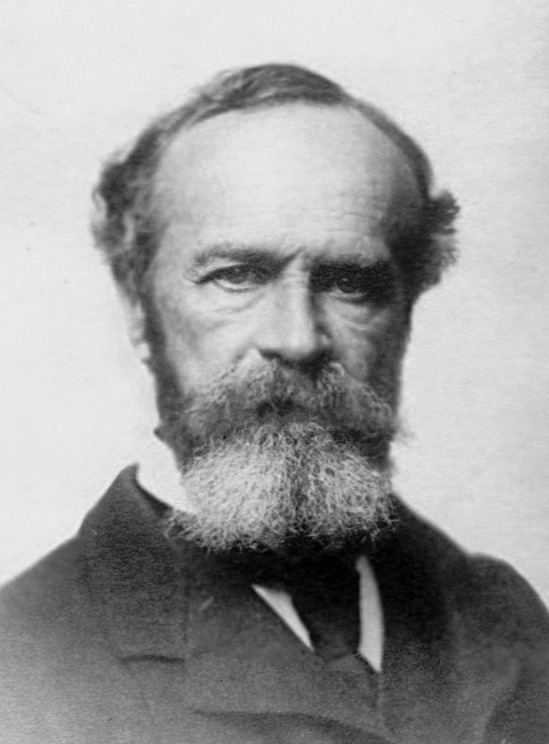
William James

In His Glassy Essence (1998), p. 279ff, Kenneth L. Ketner speculates that Peirce's second wife Juliette was of Spanish Gypsy origin, and that the middle name "Santiago" was Peirce's way of "informally ... paying tribute to his wife ... and to her cultural origins as a Spanish woman who was a Gitano, or Spanish Gypsy of Andalusia." It involves the movement of Gypsies into Spain along the pilgrimage to Santiago de Compostela, Santiago's being the patron saint of Spain, Juliette's being in Spain at the time when Peirce's friend and colleague Schröder's Logik was published, and other reasons.

In November 2007, Jaime Nubiola endorsed Joseph Ransdell's view that "It is simply a mystery at this point".
