= Arisbe =

Arisbe (Ancient Greek: Ἀρίσβη) may refer to:

- Another name for Batea (daughter of Teucer), a person in Greek mythology
- Arisbe (daughter of Merops), an early wife of King Priam of Troy, also daughter of the seer Merops of Percote
- Arisba, an ancient city in the Troad
- Arisba (Lesbos), an ancient town on Lesbos
- arisbe, a species of owl butterflies
- Arisbe, American philosopher Charles Sanders Peirce's estate in Pennsylvania
