= Macareus of Lesbos =

King of Lesbos

In Greek mythology, Macareus (Ancient Greek: Μακαρεύς, Makareus means "happy") or Macar (/ˈmeɪkər/; Μάκαρ Makar) was an Olenian prince who became the king of the island of Lesbos.

== Family ==
Macareus was the son of King Crinacus (Crineus) of Olenus. His grandfather was either Zeus or Hyrieus, eponymous king of Hyria in Boeotia.

Lesbos, son of Lapithes and grandson of Aeolus, after whom the island came to be named, married Macareus' daughter, Methymna (eponym of Methymna, a city at Lesbos). Among Macareus' other daughters were Mytilene, Agamede, Antissa, Arisbe and Issa all eponyms of cities at Lesbos.

His sons were entrusted by him the leadership of the colonies he founded on the neighbouring islands: Cydrolaus was sent to Samos, Neandrus to Cos, Leucippus to Rhodes (where the colonists mixed with the local population), and an unnamed son to Chios. Yet another son of Macareus, Eresus, gave his name to a town on Lesbos (modern Eresos).

== Mythology ==
The following text is taken from Diodorus Siculus:

And seven generations later, after the flood of Deucalion had taken place and much of mankind had perished, it came to pass that Lesbos was also laid desolate by the deluge of waters. And after these events Macareus came to the island, and, recognizing the beauty of the land, he made his home in it.

Now at first Macareus made his home in Lesbos, but later, as his power kept steadily increasing because of the fertility of the island and also of his own fairness and sense of justice, he won for himself the neighbouring islands and portioned out the land, which was uninhabited. And it was during this time that Lesbos, the son of Lapithes, the son of Aeolus, the son of Hippotes, in obedience to an oracle of Pytho, sailed with colonists to the island we are discussing, and, marrying Methymna, the daughter of Macareus, he made his home there with her; and when he became a man of renown, he named the island Lesbos after himself and called the folk Lesbians. And there was born to Macareus, in addition to other daughters, Mytilene and Methymna, from whom the cities in the island got their names. Moreover, Macareus, essaying to bring under his control the neighbouring islands, dispatched a colony to Chios first of all, entrusting the leadership of the colony to one of his own sons; and after this he dispatched another son, Cydrolaus by name, to Samos, where he settled, and after portioning out the island in allotments to the colonists he became king over it. The third island he settled was Cos, and he appointed Neandrus to be its king; and then he dispatched Leucippus, together with a large body of colonists, to Rhodes, and the inhabitants of Rhodes received them gladly, because there was a lack of men among them, and they dwelt together as one people on the island.

The mainland opposite the islands, we find, had suffered great and terrible misfortunes, in those times, because of the floods. Thus, since the fruits were destroyed over a long period by reason of the deluge, there was a dearth of the necessities of life and a pestilence prevailed among the cities because of the corruption of the air. The islands, on the other hand, since they were exposed to the breeze and supplied the inhabitants with wholesome air, and since they also enjoyed good crops, were filled with greater and greater abundance, and they quickly made the inhabitants objects of envy. Consequently, they have been given the name Islands of the Blessed, the abundance they enjoy of good things constituting the reason for the epithet.

But there are some who say that they were given the name Islands of the Blessed (macarioi) after Macareus, since his sons were the rulers over them. And, speaking generally, the islands we have mentioned have enjoyed a felicity far surpassing that of their neighbours, not only in ancient times but also in our own age; for being as they the finest of all in richness of soil, excellence of location, and mildness of climate, it is with good reason that they are called, what in truth they are, "blessed." As for Macareus himself, while he was king of Lesbos he issued a law which contributed much to the common good, and he called the law the "Lion," giving it this name after the strength and courage of that beast.
