= Agamede =

Several figures in Greek mythology

Agamede /ˌæɡəˈmiːdi/ (Ancient Greek: Ἀγαμήδη) was a name attributed to three separate women in classical Greek mythology and legendary history.

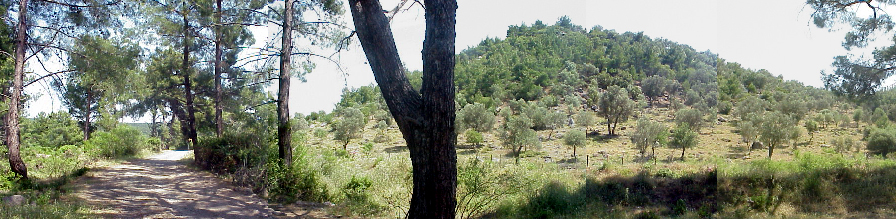
The hill Vounaros was the location of ancient Agamede

- Agamede was, according to Homer, a Greek physician acquainted with the healing powers of all the plants that grow upon the earth. She was born in Elis, a princess as the eldest daughter of Augeas, King of the Eleans, and was married to Mulius, the first man killed in battle by Nestor during a war between Elis and Pylos. Hyginus makes her the mother of Actor, Belus and Dictys by Poseidon. She was called Perimede by both Propertius and Theocritus. By the Hellenistic period (c. 4th to 1st centuries BC), Agamede had become a sorceress-figure, much like Circe or Medea.
- Agamede, a princess of Lesbos as the daughter of King Macar and possible sister to Methymna, Mytilene, Antissa, Arisbe and Issa eponyms also of the cities at Lesbos. Her possible brothers were Cydrolaus, Neandrus, Leucippus and Eresus. From Agamede, a place in Lesbos, was believed to have derived its name. The town of Agamede had already disappeared in Pliny's day. Ancient Agamede has been identified recently with the ancient ruins on a small hill called "Vounaros" 3 km north of ancient Pyrrha.
- Agamede, a princess of Troy as a daughter of Anchises. She was sister to Aeneas.
