= Agamede (Lesbos) =

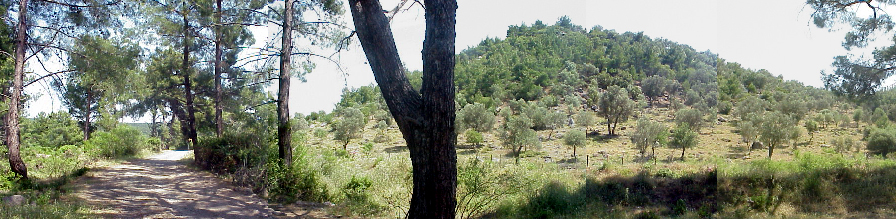
The hill Vounaros was the location of ancient Agamede

Agamede (Ancient Greek: Ἀγαμήδη) was a town of ancient Lesbos. According to Stephanus of Byzantium, it was named after Agamede, a daughter of Macar. The town had already disappeared in Pliny's day.

The site of Agamede has been identified in 2002 with the ancient ruins on a small hill called Vounaros 3 km north of ancient Pyrrha.
