= Allegory of Industry =

Painting by Francisco de Goya

- Alegoría de la Industria (Spanish)
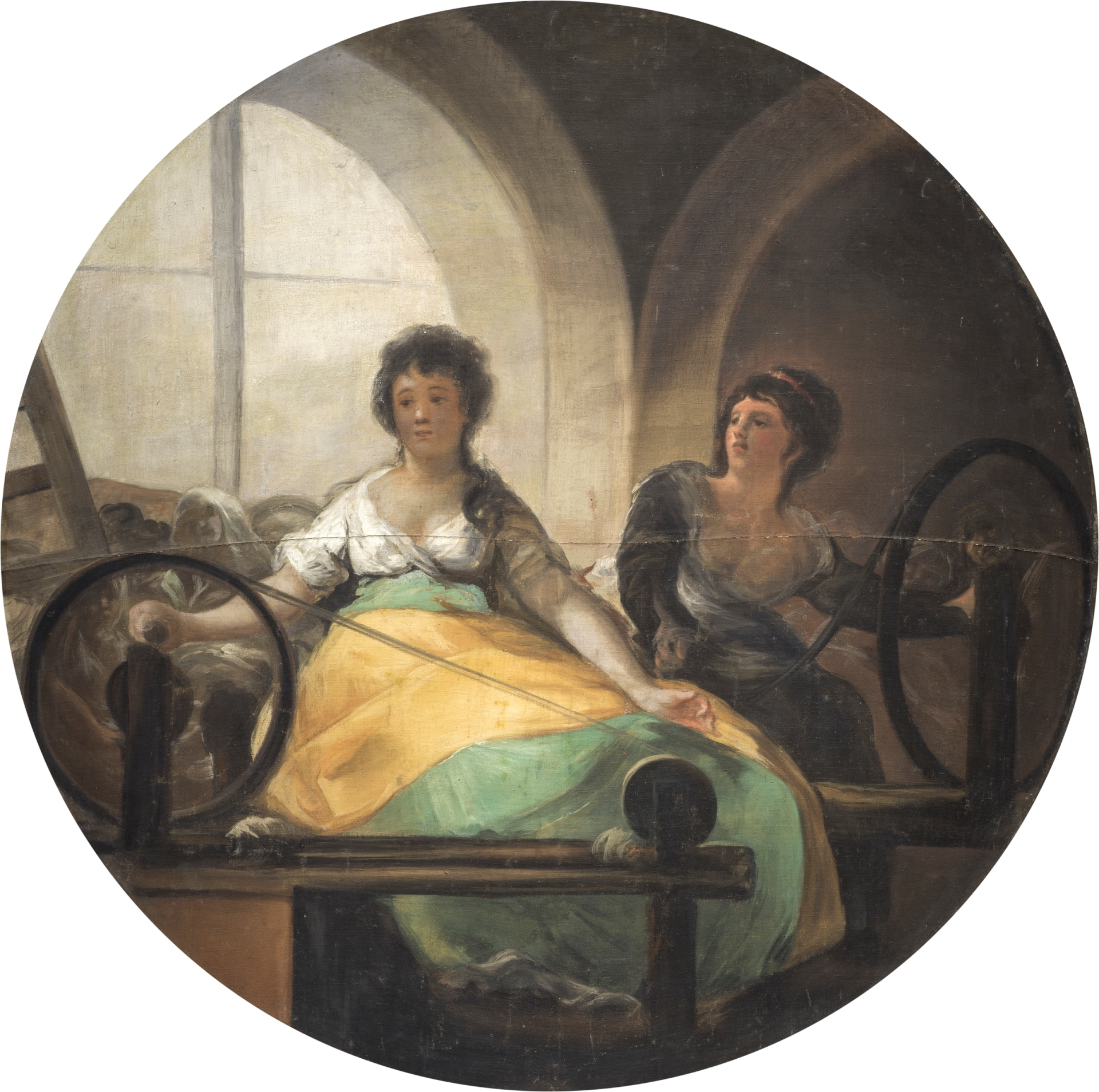
- Artist: Francisco Goya
- Year: c. 1805
- Medium: Tempera on canvas
- Dimensions: 227 cm diameter (89 in)
- Location: Museo del Prado; Madrid

Allegory of Industry is a tempera on canvas tondo painted by Francisco Goya, c. 1805. It was one of the four paintings from a series of allegories about scientific and economic progress (including the Allegory of Agriculture, Allegory of Commerce, and Allegory of Science, the latter of which has been lost), which decorated a waiting room of the residence of Manuel Godoy, Prime Minister of Spain during the reign of Charles IV. Since 1932, the picture has been in the Museo del Prado. The image shows two young women as they thread their respective spinning wheels in a semi-darkened room, illuminated by a large window which opens from the left (from the point of view of the observer). At the back, in the dark, one can discern uncertain faces of old women (who have been linked to the Fates). The uncertainty of these women doesn’t reveal whether or not they are factor workers or representations of the tapestry or canvas.

== Analysis ==
The themes of the allegory show Goya’s desire to appear as an enlightened and reformist leader and the ultimate guarantor of economic and scientific progress of Spain, in relation to the activities of the Sociedad Económica de los Amigos del País, which thrived at the time. However, this painting is an indicator of the stale concept that the Spain of that time could develop its industry, but the image itself is far from representing the Industrial Revolution which was occurring in the more developed regions of Europe. The image departs from the model of the Ancien Régime (see Las Hilanderas by Velázquez), but it is far from representative of the industrial era, as there is no increase in the number of spinners to reflect the mass production of industry and the work itself is being done on simple machines, instead of the more advanced devices used in the more developed countries. Furthermore, the clothes the women are wearing are not typical of the industrial working class. The low necklines, white blouses and melancholy and distracted attitudes more accurately belong to upper class women than those who would work in a factory. The robustness of their bodies also isn’t the best way to imagine the regular conditions of nutrition of the industrial working class. It is a traditional and very flat representation in its symbolism and in its own way it shows the conceptual gap between what the wealthy thought of the industrial revolution should be and what it was actually like.

== See also ==
- List of works by Francisco Goya
