= Amphissa (mythology) =

In Greek mythology, Amphissa (Ancient Greek: Ἄμφισσα) may refer to the following personages:

- Amphissa, daughter of Macareus.
- Amphissa, an alternate name for Metope, the daughter of King Echetus and lover of Aechmodicus.
