= Joseph Ransdell =

Joseph Ransdell may refer to:

- Joseph E. Ransdell (1858–1954), attorney and politician who served as a United States senator and congressman from Louisiana
- Joseph Morton Ransdell (1931–2010), professor of philosophy
