= Juliette Peirce =

Second wife of Charles Sanders Peirce

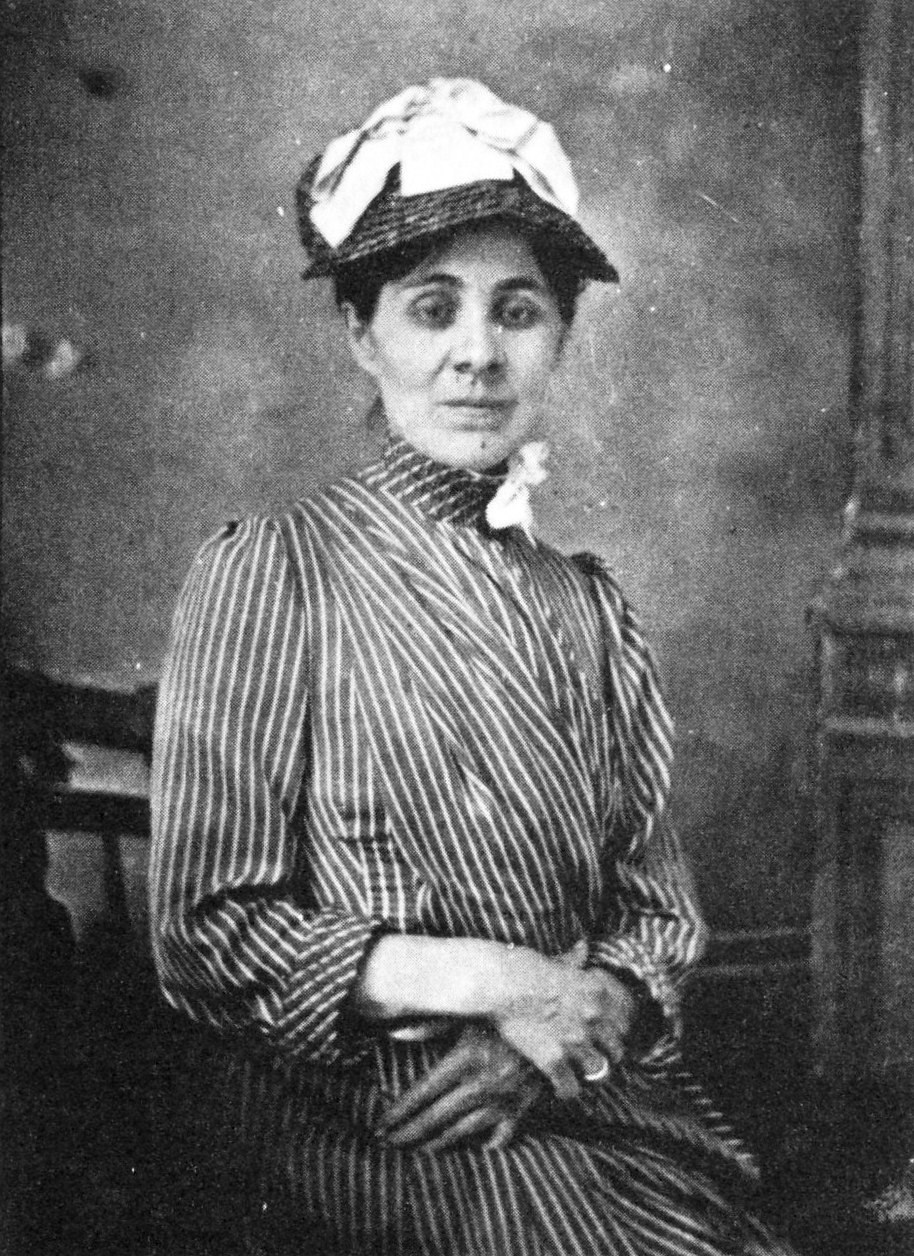
Juliette Peirce in 1883, the year she married Charles

Juliette Peirce (/pɜːrs/; died October 4, 1934) was the second wife of the mathematician and philosopher Charles Sanders Peirce.

== History ==
Almost nothing is known about Juliette Peirce's life before she met Charles—not even her name, which is variously given as Juliette Annette Froissy or Juliette Pourtalai. Some historians believe she was French, but others have speculated that she had a Gypsy heritage (Ketner 1998, p. 279ff). On occasion, she claimed to be a Habsburg princess. Scanty facts about her provide only a few possible clues to her past. She spoke French, had her own income, had gynecological illnesses that prevented her from having children, and owned a deck of tarot cards said to have predicted the downfall of Napoleon. She probably first met Charles in New York City at the Hotel Brevoort's New Year's Eve ball in December 1876.

=== Controversy ===
Charles Peirce's first wife, Harriet Melusina Fay, had left him in 1875, but he was not divorced from her until 1882. Charles and Juliette became close friends and travel companions, and were likely romantically involved before his divorce was official. This indiscretion is sometimes said to have cost him his career. Peirce had a teaching position at Johns Hopkins University.

When he was being considered for a permanent post, one of the major American scientists of the day, Simon Newcomb, who apparently did not like Peirce, pointed out to a Johns Hopkins trustee that Peirce, while an employee of the university, had traveled with a woman to whom he was not married. The ensuing scandal led to Peirce's dismissal. His later applications to many universities for teaching posts were all unsuccessful, and in fact he never again held a full-time permanent position anywhere. As a result, Juliette was often blamed for Peirce's failure to reach the eminent social stature his intellect might have commanded.

There were strains with Peirce's mother Sarah, brother Jem (James Mills Peirce), and most of all his aunt Lizzie, who owned the house in which Sarah and Jem lived, but despite that and strains in the marriage itself, Peirce remained powerfully attached to Juliette. In a diary entry for January 6, 1889, Peirce wrote, regarding Juliette's health, "If I should lose her, I would not survive her. Therefore, I must turn my whole energy to saving her." Except during occasional travels by one or the other, they remained together until his death in 1914, and she never remarried.

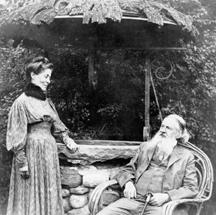
Juliette and Charles by the well at their home, Arisbe, in 1907

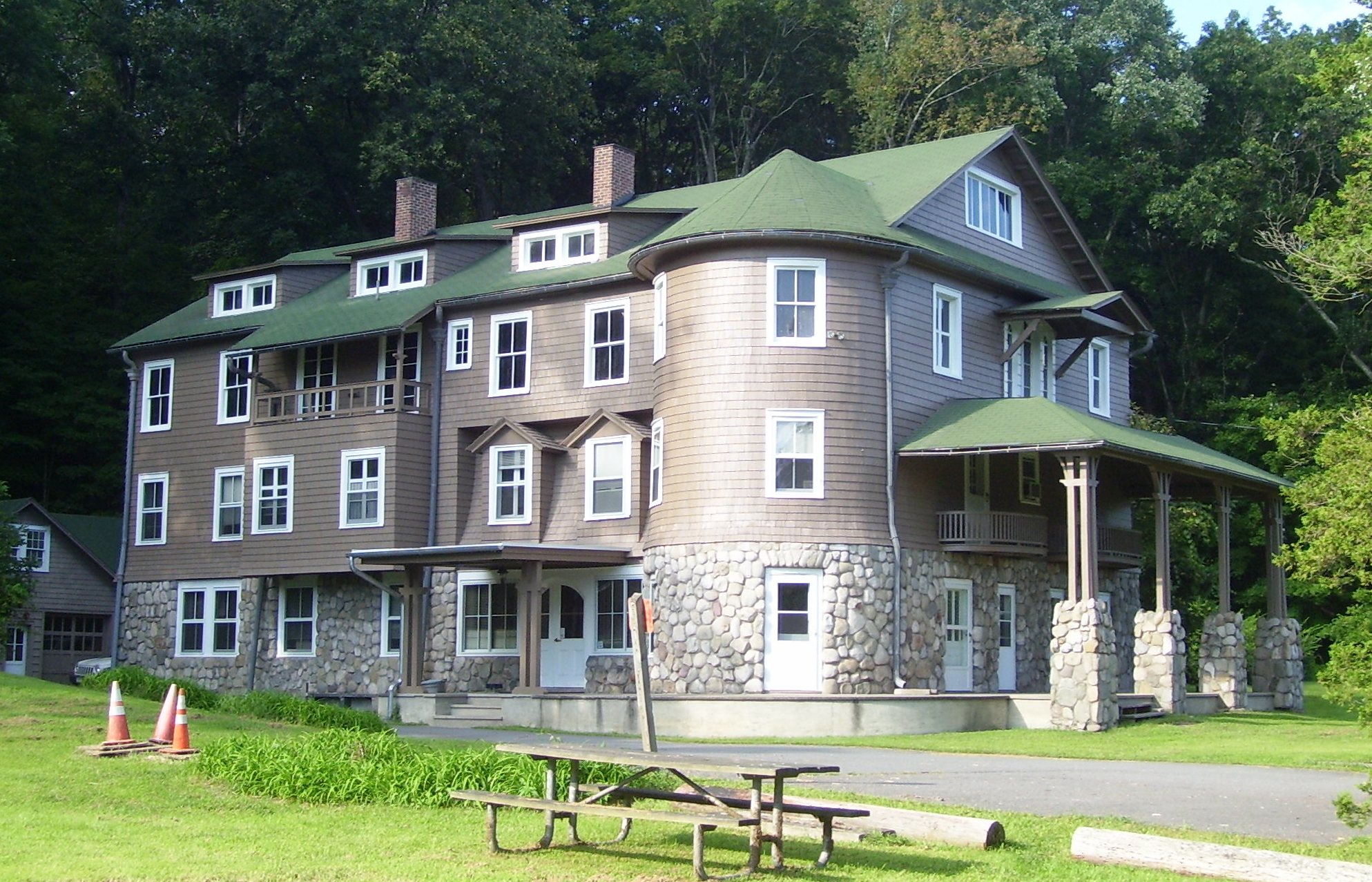
"Arisbe" in 2011

=== Arisbe ===
In 1887 Peirce spent part of his inheritance from his parents to buy 2,000 acres (8 km^{2}) of rural land near Milford, Pennsylvania, land that never yielded an economic return. There he had an 1854 farmhouse remodeled to his design. The local people, many of whom were French, accepted Juliette. The Peirces led an active social life there and became friends with relatives of Gifford Pinchot. Except for occasional travels and stays elsewhere, the Peirces spent the rest of their lives there. They named their property Arisbe for possibly any or all of the following reasons:

- The ancient city of Arisbe was a colony of the city-state of Miletus, which was the scene of much early Greek philosophy and science.
- The Iliad tells of Axylus, who welcomed all passers-by into his house near a public road in Arisbe, Homer remarking that later none of them stood between Axylus and death in battle.
- Reasons connected with other meanings of "Arisbe" (see Arisbe (disambiguation)).
- "Arisbe" is an anagram of French baiser, "kiss" (a word that since the 16th century has also meant "to have sexual intercourse").

Even as they sank into poverty, they continued to make expansions to the house, almost losing it and their land because of unpaid debts.

=== A Santiago conjecture ===
In His Glassy Essence (1998), p. 279ff, Kenneth Ketner speculates that Juliette was of Spanish Gypsy origin, and that Charles's adding "Santiago" to his name was his way of "informally ... paying tribute to his wife ... and to her cultural origins as a Spanish woman who was a Gitano, or Spanish Gypsy of Andalusia." It involves the movement of Gypsies into Spain along the pilgrimage to Santiago de Compostela, Santiago's being the patron saint of Spain, Juliette's being in Spain at the time when Peirce's friend and colleague Ernst Schröder's Logik was published, and other reasons.

=== Illnesses and Juliette's widowhood ===
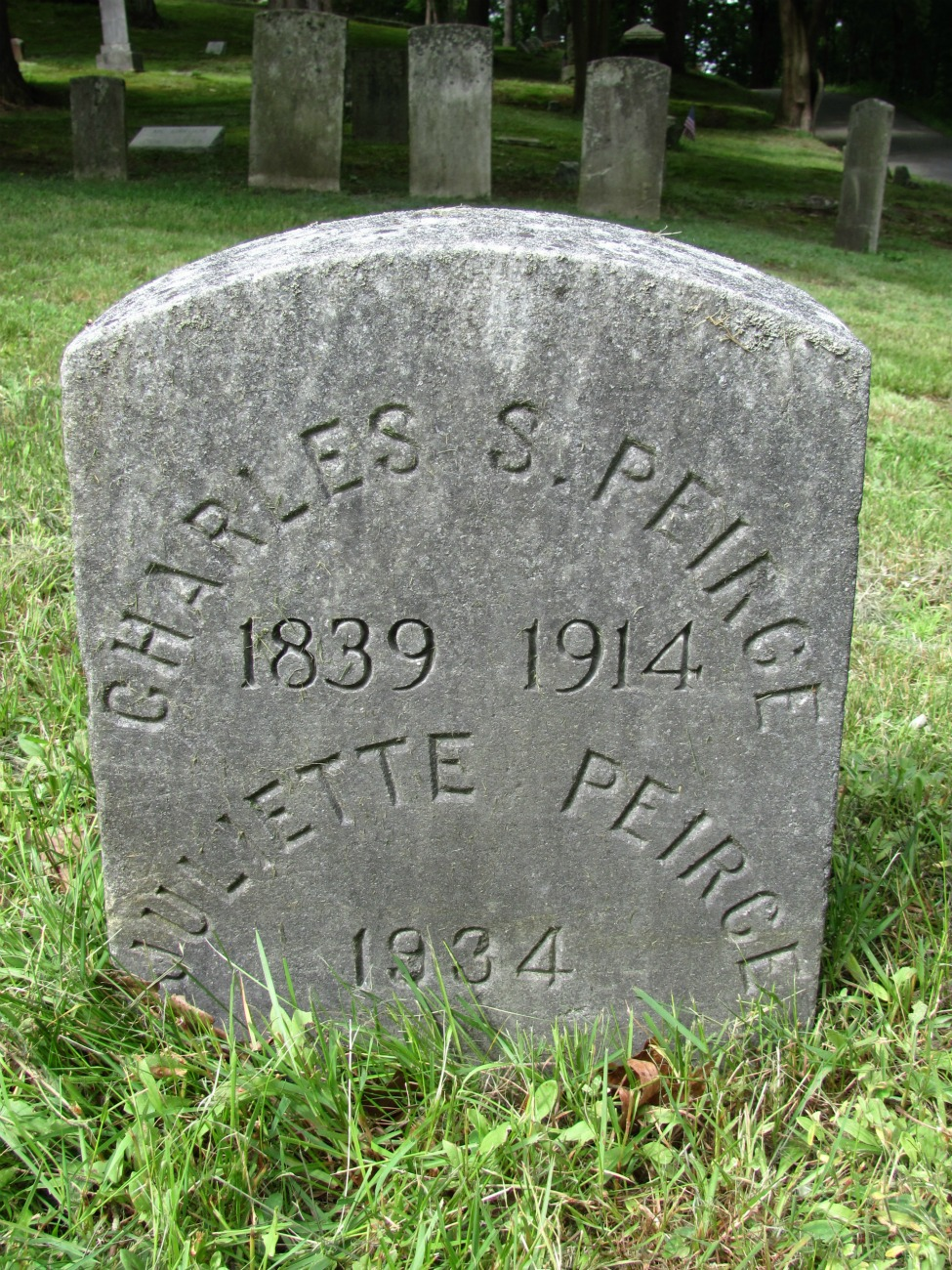
Grave of Charles and Juliette Peirce, Milford Cemetery

Peirce suffered from his late teens through the rest of his life with an ailment then known as "facial neuralgia" which would today be diagnosed as trigeminal neuralgia, a chronic, intensely painful condition against which he self-medicated with drugs such as morphine, cocaine, and alcohol. His mental and physical illnesses worsened with time, and he suffered numerous breakdowns over the course of his life, rendering him increasingly unreliable. His earnings from temporary posts, lectures and articles dwindled, until he and Juliette lived in poverty. At his death he had more than 100,000 pages of unpublished writing. Juliette sold these to Harvard and Victor Lenzen was responsible for relocating them there.

In her later years, Juliette was described as increasingly frail and eventually died of tuberculosis. After Peirce's death in 1914, she was left destitute and alone. She lived for another twenty years, devoting herself to securing recognition for Peirce and his ideas. She died in Milford, Pennsylvania. An obituary in Science described her as a "gracious lady" who "lived and passed away...in the distinction of her devotion."

== In popular culture ==
Pierce-Arrow by Susan Howe (1999) consists of an essay and poems focusing on Charles and his wife Juliette. The spelling of the title is correct, referring to the old motor car company, as well as punning for example on the Peirce arrow ("$\downarrow$"), logical symbol for "neither...nor...".
