= Arachne =

Mythological weaver who was transformed into a spider

- Seamstress
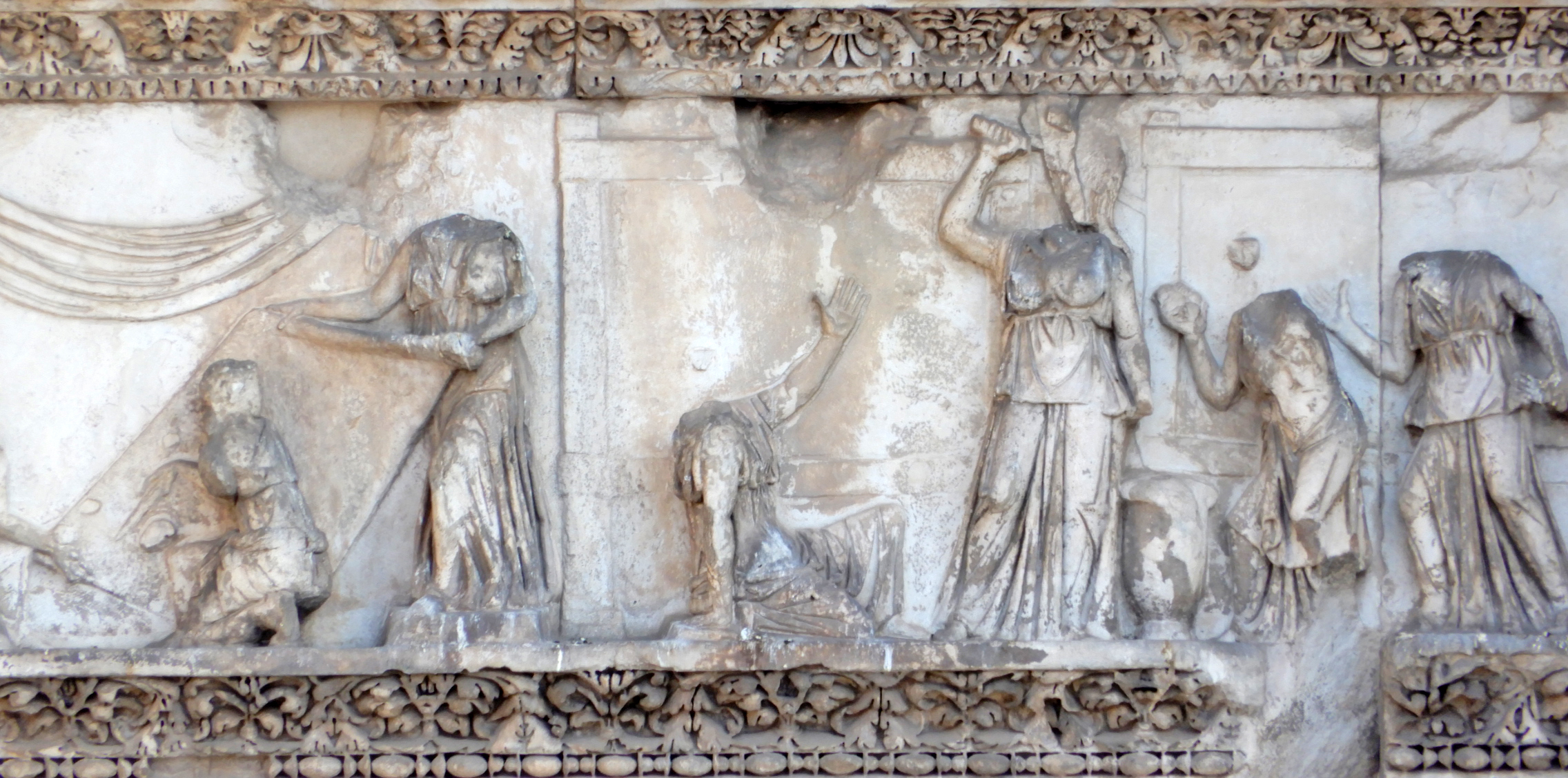
- The myth of Arachne as depicted on the frieze of the Colonnacce, Forum of Nerva
- Region: Attica or Lydia

Genealogy
- Parents: Idmon (father)
- Siblings: Phalanx
- Children: Closter

Arachne (/əˈrækniː/; from Ancient Greek: Ἀράχνη, romanized: Arákhnē, lit. 'spider', cognate with Latin araneus) is the protagonist of a tale in classical mythology known primarily from the version told by the Roman poet Ovid (43 BCE–17 CE). In Book Six of his epic poem Metamorphoses, Ovid recounts how the talented mortal Arachne challenged the goddess Minerva (the Roman equivalent of Athena) to a weaving contest. When Minerva found that Arachne's tapestry mocked the gods, the goddess, though approving of Arachne's talent, became enraged and beat the girl with her shuttle. After Arachne hanged herself out of shame, she was transformed into a spider out of pity by Minerva. The myth both provided an etiology of spiders' web-spinning abilities and was a cautionary tale about hubris only leading to one's downfall.

== Biography ==
According to the myth as recounted by Ovid, Arachne was a Lydian maiden who was the daughter of Idmon of Colophon, who was a famous dyer in Tyrian purple. She was credited to have invented linen cloth and nets, while her son Closter introduced the use of the spindle in the manufacture of wool. She was said to have been a native of Hypaepa, near Colophon in Asia Minor.

The first of the Vatican Mythographers wrote that Arachne was the daughter of 'Edmon' and 'Ippopis'.

== Mythology ==
=== Ovid ===
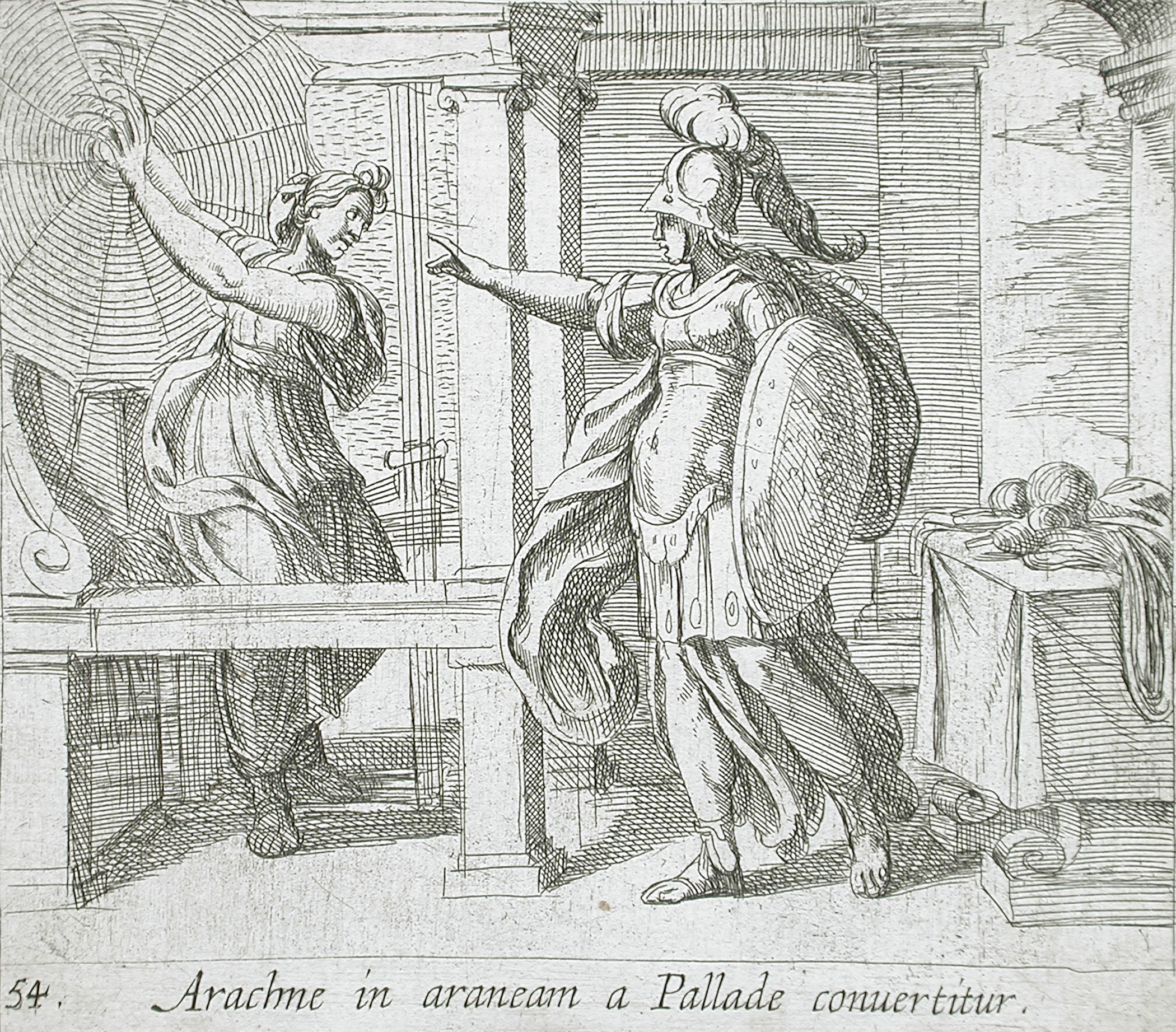
Minerva and Arachne (Antonio Tempesta)

In Metamorphoses, the Roman poet Ovid writes that Arachne was a shepherd's daughter who began weaving at an early age. She became a great weaver, boasted that her skill was greater than that of Minerva (the Roman equivalent of Athena), and refused to acknowledge that her skill came, at least in part, from the goddess. Minerva took offense and set up a contest between them. Presenting herself as an old woman, she approached the boasting girl and warned her that it was unwise to compare herself to any of the gods and that she should plead for forgiveness from Minerva.

Arachne was not disheartened and insulted the old woman even stating that she has lived far too long and boasted that if Minerva wished to make her stop, she should appear in person and do it herself. Immediately, Minerva removed her disguise and appeared in shimmering glory, clad in a sparkling white chiton. The two began weaving straight away. Minerva's weaving represented four separate contests between mortals and the gods in which the gods punished mortals for setting themselves as equals of the gods. Arachne's weaving depicted ways that the gods, particularly Jupiter, had misled and abused mortals, tricking and seducing many women. When Minerva saw Arachne's flawless work, she was enraged. She ripped Arachne's work to shreds and hit her on the head three times with her shuttle. Shaken and embarrassed, Arachne killed herself by hanging.

Seeing that, Minerva felt pity for the girl, transforming her into a spider, which would go on to create webs for all time, as would her descendants. Minerva did so by sprinkling her with the juice of Hecate's herb,

[A]nd immediately at the touch of this dark poison, Arachne's hair fell out. With it went her nose and ears, her head shrank to the smallest size, and her whole body became tiny. Her slender fingers stuck to her sides as legs, the rest is belly, from which she still spins a thread, and, as a spider, weaves her ancient web.

The myth of Arachne can also be seen as an attempt to show the relationship between art and tyrannical power in Ovid's time. He wrote under the emperor Augustus and was exiled by him. At the time, weaving was a common metaphor for poetry; therefore, Arachne's artistry and Minerva's censorship of it may offer a provocative allegory of the writer's role under an autocratic regime.

==== The tapestries ====
Minerva wove a tapestry with themes of hubris being punished by the gods, as a warning to Arachne against what she was doing, in each of its four corners. Those were Juno and Jupiter transforming Rhodope and Haemus into the eponymous mountain ranges, Juno transforming Queen Gerana into a crane for daring to boast of being more beautiful than the queen of the gods, Juno again turning Antigone into a stork for competing with her, and finally Cinyras' daughter being petrified. Those four tales surrounded the central one, which was Minerva and Neptune's dispute on the areopagus over which would receive the city of Athens; Minerva offered an olive tree, and Neptune a saltwater spring (the Athenians eventually chose Minerva). Finally, the goddess surrounded the outer edges with olive wreaths.

Arachne meanwhile chose to include several tales of male gods tricking and deceiving women by assuming other forms instead of their own. She depicted Jupiter transformed into: a bull for Europa, an eagle for Asteria, a swan for Leda, a satyr for Antiope, Amphitryon for Alcmene, golden shower for Danaë, flame for Aegina, a shepherd for Mnemosyne, and a snake for Proserpina. Neptune transformed into a bull for Canace, Enipeus for Iphimedeia, (Note: Usually, Poseidon was said to have taken the form of Enipeus to trick Tyro (who also had twins), not Iphimedeia.) a ram for Theophane, a horse for Ceres, a bird for Medusa, and a dolphin for Melantho. Apollo transformed into a shepherd for Issa, and further as a countryman, a hawk, and a lion on three more obscure occasions, Bacchus as 'delusive grapes' for Erigone, and finally Saturn as a horse for Philyra. The outer edge of the tapestry had flowers interwoven with entangled ivy.

=== Other attestations ===
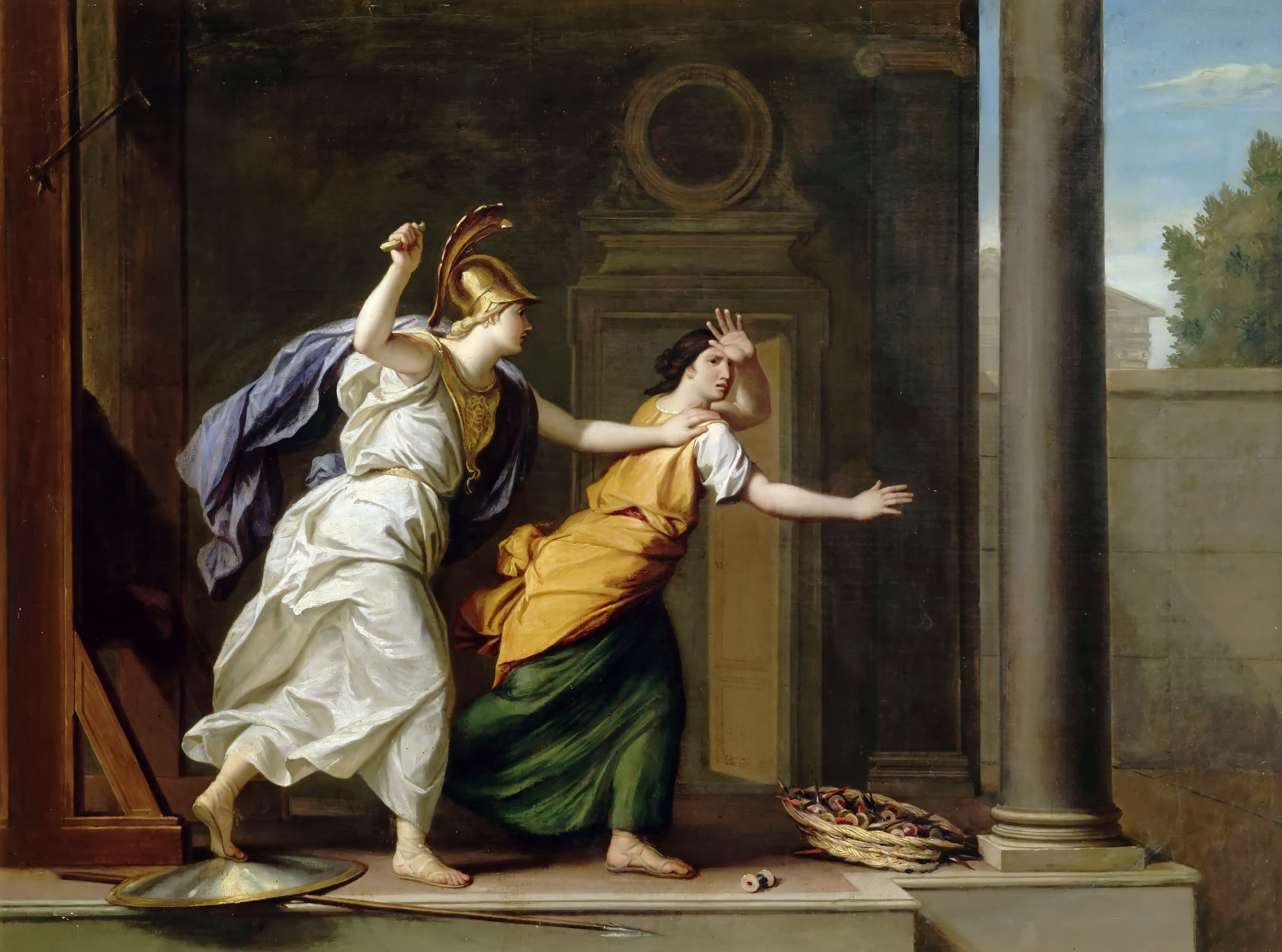
Minerva and Arachne, oil on canvas by René-Antoine Houasse, 1706

An ancient Corinthian black-figure aryballos dating to the early sixth-century BC (c. 580-560 BC) has been suggested to depict the weaving contest of Athena and Arachne, which would make it the earliest attestation of the myth if accurate. However it has been noted that this interpretation is not an indisputable one, and the aryballos could be simply depicting Athena teaching the art of weaving to the people, with no relation to the myth of Arachne whatsoever.

Meanwhile, the earliest written attestation of a spider who clashed with Minerva comes courtesy of Virgil, a Roman poet of the first century BCE who wrote that the spider is hated by Minerva but did not explain the reason why. The satirical writer Lucian, around the second century AD, wrote in his work The Gout that the "Maeonian maid Arachne thought herself Athene's match, but she lost her shape and still today must spin and spin her web". Pliny the Elder wrote that Arachne had a son, Closter (meaning "spindle" in Greek), by an unnamed father, who invented the use of the spindle in the manufacture of wool. The Vatican Mythographers also recorded the tale largely as found in Ovid, however the first of them wrote that Arachne was defeated in the contest.

In a rarer version, Arachne was a girl from Attica who was taught by Athena the art of weaving, while her brother Phalanx was taught instead martial arts by the goddess. But then the two siblings engaged in incestuous intercourse, so Athena, disgusted, changed them both into spiders, animals doomed to be devoured by their own young.

Aelian wrote that spiders neither know nor wish to know Athena's art of weaving, because such animals do not need clothes. In a different work, however, he contradicts himself by writing that spiders are 'dexterous weavers after the manner of Athena'.

== Influence ==
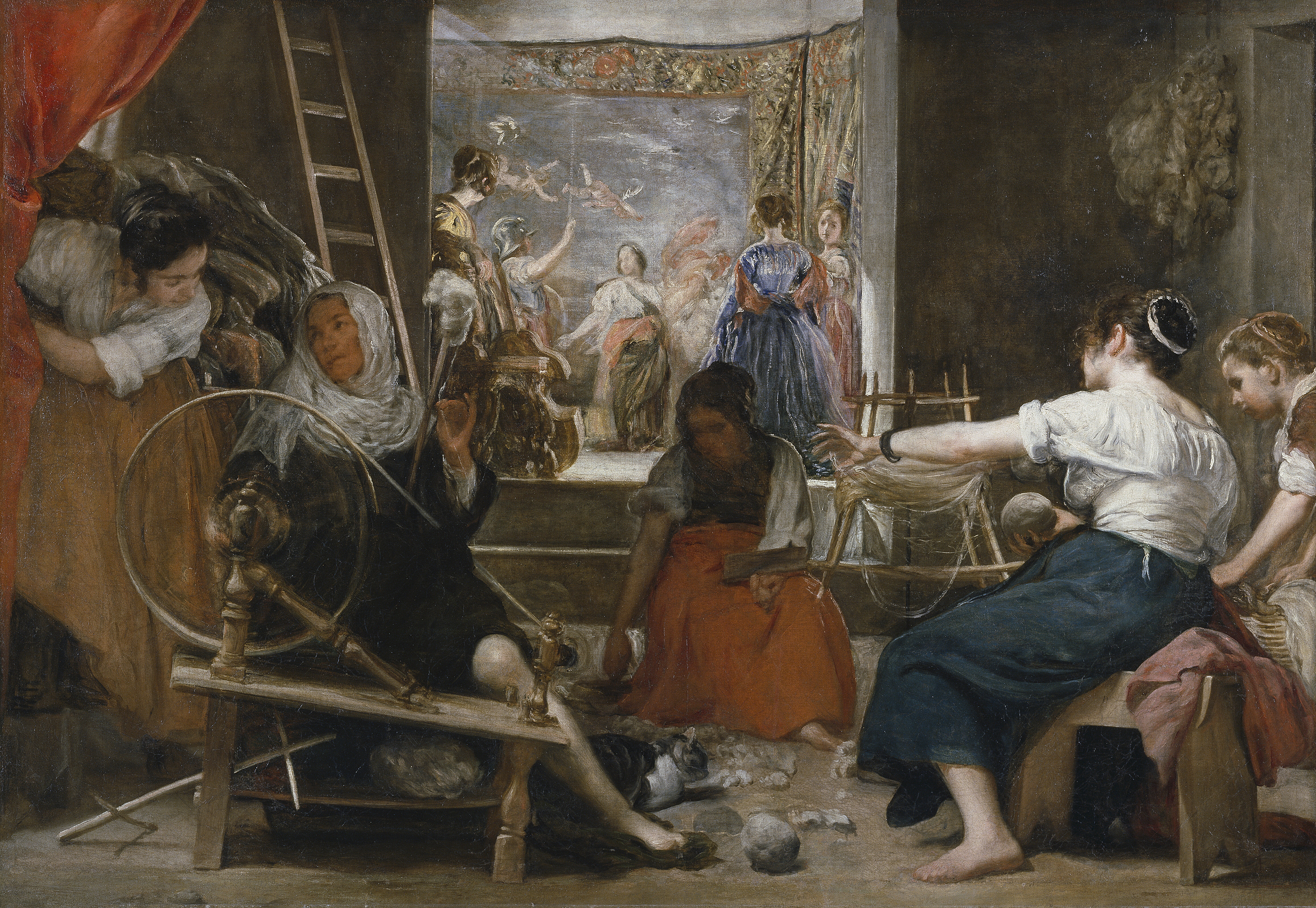
The Spinners, or, The Fable of Arachne (1644–48) by Velázquez

The metamorphosis of Arachne in Ovid's telling furnished material for an episode in Edmund Spenser's mock-heroic Muiopotmos, 257–352. Spenser's adaptation, which "rereads an Ovidian story in terms of the Elizabethan world" is designed to provide a rationale for the hatred of Arachne's descendant Aragnoll for the butterfly-hero Clarion.

Dante Alighieri uses Arachne in Canto XVII of Inferno, the first part of The Divine Comedy, to describe the horrible monster Geryon. "His back and all his belly and both flanks were painted arabesques and curlicues: the Turks and Tartars never made a fabric with richer colors intricately woven, nor were such complex webs spun by Arachne."

The tale of Arachne inspired one of Velázquez' most factual paintings: Las Hilanderas ("The Spinners, or The fable of Arachne", in the Prado), in which the painter represents the two important moments of the myth. In the front, the contest of Arachne and the goddess (the young and the old weaver), and in the back, an Abduction of Europa that is a copy of Titian's version (or maybe of Rubens' copy of Titian). In front of it appears Minerva (Athena) at the moment she punishes Arachne. It transforms the myth into a reflection about creation and imitation, god and man, master and pupil (and therefore about the nature of art).

It has also been suggested that Jeremias Gotthelf's nineteenth-century novella, The Black Spider, was heavily influenced by the Arachne story from Ovid's Metamorphoses. In the novella, a woman is turned into a venomous spider having reneged on a deal with the devil.

== Gallery ==
Depictions
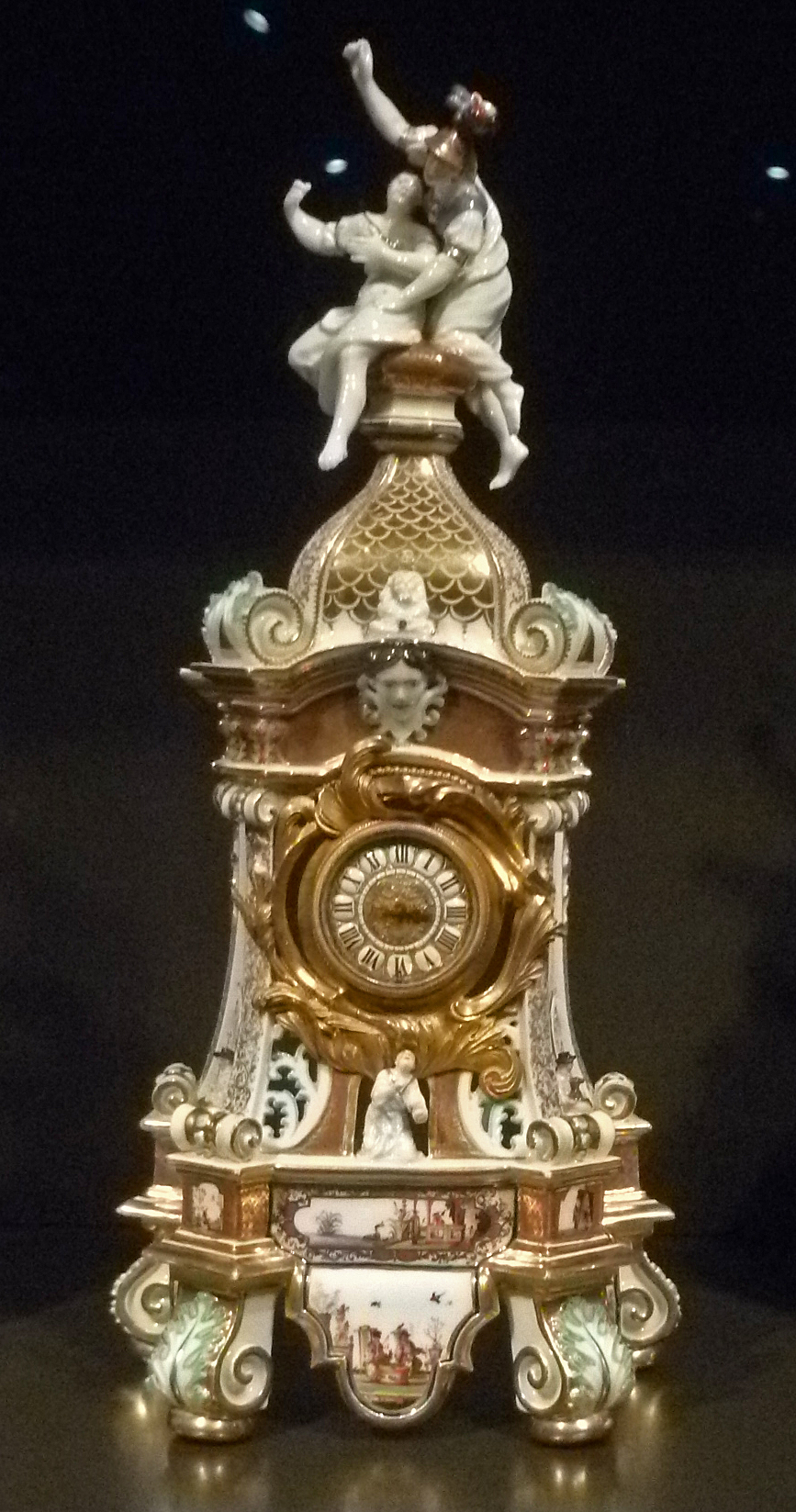
Pendule with Arachne and Athena in Meissen porcelain, attributed to Johann Gottlieb Kirchner and George Fritzsche (1727)

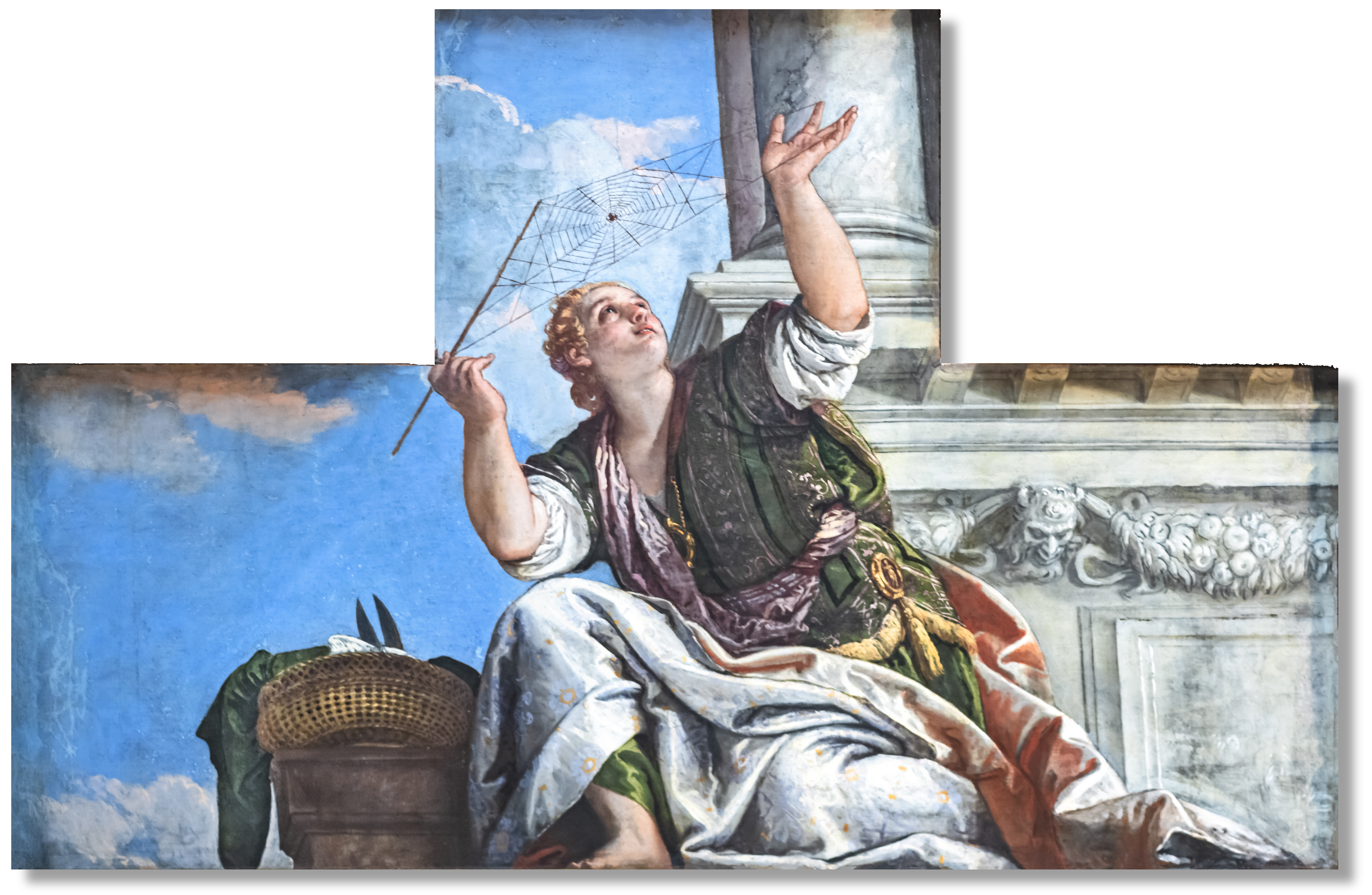
Paolo Veronese - Dialettica - Palazzo Ducale

== See also ==
- Cultural depictions of spiders
- Marsyas, a satyr who engaged in a musical contest with Apollo and also suffered for his presumption
- Medusa, who was also transformed as a result of Athena's wrath in some versions
- Alcinoë of Corinth, another woman punished by Athena over a textile-related matter
- 407 Arachne, an asteroid named after Arachne

== Bibliography ==
=== Primary sources ===
- Aelian, On the Characteristics of Animals, translated by Alwyn Faber Scholfield (1884–1969), from Aelian, Characteristics of Animals, published in three volumes by Harvard/Heinemann, Loeb Classical Library, 1958. Available at Topos Text.
- Aelian, Historical Miscellany, edited and translated by N. G. Wilson, published by Harvard University Press, Loeb Classical Library 486, 1997. ISBN 0-674-99535-X. Google books.
- Ovid, Metamorphoses vi.1–145
- Pliny the Elder, Naturalis Historia vii.56.196
- Virgil, Georgics iv.246-247

=== Secondary sources ===
- Harry Thurston Peck, Harpers Dictionary of Classical Antiquities (1898) (13.23)
- Chisholm, Hugh, ed. (1911). "Arachne" . Encyclopædia Britannica (11th ed.). Cambridge University Press.
