= Mytilene (mythology) =

Character in mythology

In Greek mythology, the name Mytilene (Ancient Greek: Μυτιλήνη) may refer to one of the following figures, all of whom are counted among possible eponyms of the city Mytilene:

- Mytilene, sister of the Amazon Myrina. She took part in her sister's campaign and had the city named after her.
- Mytilene, a princess as the daughter of King Macareus of Lesbos or of the Pisatian king Pelops. She was the mother of Myton by Poseidon. As daughter of Macareus, Mytilene was probably the sister of Agamede, Antissa, Arisbe, Issa and Methymna all were eponyms of the cities at Lesbos. One of the legends about the name of the town of Mytilene, is that it derived its name from her or from her son (another legend is that the town named after a personage of the name of Mytilus). Her possible brothers were Cydrolaus, Neandrus, Leucippus and Eresus.

Other mythical eponyms of Mytilene include the aforementioned Myton and an inhabitant of the city named Mytilus.
