= Myton (mythology) =

In Greek mythology, Myton (Ancient Greek: Μύτωνος Mýtonos) was the son of Poseidon and Mytilene, daughter of King Macareus of Lesbos or of Pelops, king of Pisa in Elis. He was also considered as the eponym of the city Mytilene.
