= Echetus =

Greek mythological figure

Echetus (/ˈɛkɪtəs/; Ancient Greek: Ἔχετος, romanized: Ékhetos) is a mythical king and son of Euchenor (Εὐχήνωρ) and Phlogea (Φλόγεα) mentioned in Homer's Odyssey. The epic describes him as a frightening and cruel king from the "mainland" (ἠπείρο), or "dark mainland" (ἠπείροιο μελαίνης), seen through the perspective of Homer's Ithaca. Some scholars, such as Richard Hodges and Anna Lefteratou, refer to Echetus as a "king of Epirus".

== Mythology ==
He is mentioned in book 18 of Homer's Odyssey, as well as in book 21 in which he is described as the "destroyer of all mortals" by Antinous (one of the suitors).

In book 18, the beggar Irus was threatened with being handed over to Echetus, who would then have had Irus's nose, ears and testes cut off and thrown to his dogs. The story also described how Echetus had a daughter, Metope, who had an intrigue with a lover; as a punishment Echetus mutilated the lover and blinded Metope by piercing her eyes with bronze needles. He then incarcerated her in a tower and gave her grains of bronze, promising that she would regain her sight when she had ground these grains into flour. Eustathius and the scholia on this passage call the daughter and her lover Amphissa and Aechmodicus respectively; according to these, he punished Aechmodicus by inviting him to a feast where he cut off his genitals.

Some time later, Echetus succumbed to madness and died after consuming his own flesh.

== Modern analyses on Echetus ==
It is thought that Echetus was a mythological creation, used to scare disobedient children or used as the villain in bedtime stories. An alternate theory is that Echetus was a real king around the time of Homer, and that he was quite deformed and possibly a cannibal; no evidence currently exists to support this theory, however.

The word epironde (ἤπειρόνδε, "towards the mainland") appears in book 18 of the Odyssey in a passage involving King Echetus. Margaret Foster, in agreement with Irad Malkin, states that the word generally refers to mainland Greece from the perspective of Homer's Ithaca. Richard Hodges and Anna Lefteratou refer to Echetus as a mythical "king of Epirus", specifying the part of the Greek mainland that Echetus ruled over.

The word epeiros (ἤπειρος) first appears in Homer's Odyssey used mainly "to define land in opposition to sea" and seldomly to "designate the mainland core of north-western Greece" (i.e., Epirus). For Douzougli and Papadopoulos, the use of epeiros (ἤπειρος) in Homer is purely geographical; Pliakou states that the term, at least in book 24 of the Odyssey, also references the region of northwestern Greece. Epirus (τῆς Ἠπείρου), as a proper name, is first attested in the 6th century BCE by Hecataeus of Miletus.

Ultimately, Echetus and Thesprotia in the Odyssey are from the same "dark mainland" according to Irad Malkin. King Echetus, appearing to belong to the mainland directly opposite Ithaca, is hostile to the island whereas Thesprotia, a more distant region, is Ithaca's ally.
