= Amphissa (daughter of Macareus) =

In Greek mythology, Amphissa (Ancient Greek: Ἄμφισσα, romanized: Ámphissa), also called Issa (/ˈiːsɑː/; Ἴσσα) was the daughter of Macareus and a lover of Apollo. She was the eponym of the city Amphissa in Ozolian Locris, where her memory was perpetuated by a splendid monument.

== Mythology ==
One may assume that Amphissa was the child conceived in the incestuous relationship between Macareus and his sister Canace, but it appears from Ovid that the child was male, and that it was torn apart by wild beasts upon being exposed by Aeolus.

Amphissa is likely the same as "Issa the daughter of Macareus" mentioned by Ovid as a lover of Apollo who initially seduced her in the disguise of a shepherd. Their story was one of the images Arachne wove into her weaving during her contest with Athena, along with other disguises that Apollo, Zeus, Poseidon and Dionysus used when seducing mortal women and nymphs.

Hyginus makes mention of Euboea, a daughter of a Macareus and the mother of Agreus by Apollo; this may or may not be an alternate version of Amphissa's story.
