= 407 Arachne =

Main-belt asteroid

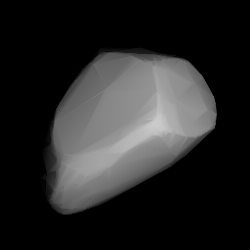
- Modelled shape of Arachne from its lightcurve

Discovery
- Discovered by: Max Wolf
- Discovery date: 13 October 1895

Designations
- Pronunciation: /əˈrækniː/
- Named after: Arachne
- Alternative designations: 1895 CC
- Minor planet category: Main belt
- Adjectives: Arachnean /ærəkˈniːən/

Orbital characteristics
- Epoch 31 July 2016 (JD 2457600.5)
- Uncertainty parameter 0
- Observation arc: 116.62 yr (42596 d)
- Aphelion: 2.80706 AU (419.930 Gm)
- Perihelion: 2.44624 AU (365.952 Gm)
- Semi-major axis: 2.62665 AU (392.941 Gm)
- Eccentricity: 0.068685
- Orbital period (sidereal): 4.26 yr (1554.9 d)
- Mean anomaly: 155.411°
- Mean motion: 0° 13^{m} 53.497^{s} / day
- Inclination: 7.52045°
- Longitude of ascending node: 294.698°
- Argument of perihelion: 81.6776°

Physical characteristics
- Mean diameter: 97.33±1.16 km (composite estimate)
- Mass: (4.2±1.6)×10^{17} kg (Note: Calculated from its standard gravitational parameter GM = 0.028±0.011 km^{3}/s^{2}.)
- Mean density: 0.94 g/cm^{3} (Note: Assuming a diameter of 95.1 km.)
- Synodic rotation period: 22.62 h (0.943 d)
- Geometric albedo: 0.0548±0.007
- Spectral type: C
- Absolute magnitude (H): 8.88

407 Arachne is a large Main belt asteroid. It is classified as a C-type asteroid and is probably composed of carbonaceous material. It was discovered on 13 October 1895, by German astronomer Max Wolf at Heidelberg Observatory.

407 Arachne has been observed to occult 9 stars between 2002 and 2023.
