= Phalanx (mythology) =

Greek mythological figure

Phalanx (Ancient Greek: Φάλαγξ, romanized: Phálanx, lit. 'spider') is a minor Attic figure in Greek mythology who features in a lesser-known narrative of the myth of Arachne, the girl who enraged the goddess Athena by boasting of being a better weaver than her and was thus transformed into a spider by the goddess following a weaving match between the two. In this version of the story however, Phalanx is Arachne's brother, and they are both punished by Athena when they break a societal taboo.

Phalanx does not appear in the version where Arachne challenges Athena to a weaving contest, which is the most known version of the myth involving Arachne and spider metamorphosis. His story survives in an ancient scholium.

== Etymology ==
In Liddell & Scott the ancient Greek feminine noun φάλαγξ, usually used to mean the phalanx (a clustered mass of infantry), can refer among other things to beams, the bone between joints in fingers and toes, round pieces of wood, trunk or logs and generally beam-shaped objects (like a spider's legs).

It is related to the word φαλάγγιον (phalángion, literally 'little phalanx') which is the ancient Greek word for the venomous barrel spider. Pliny used phalangium for the daddy-long-legs. According to Robert Beekes the ending formation in -nx (also found in words like φάραγξ, σῆραγξ, and φάρυγξ) points to a pre-Greek origin for the word.

== Family ==
Phalanx was the brother of Arachne, thus possibly the son of Arachne's father Idmon, a famous purple dyer from Colophon, however Idmon appears in the Lydian versions, which do not include Phalanx. Through his sister he had a nephew named Closter ("spinner", the son of spider).

== Mythology ==
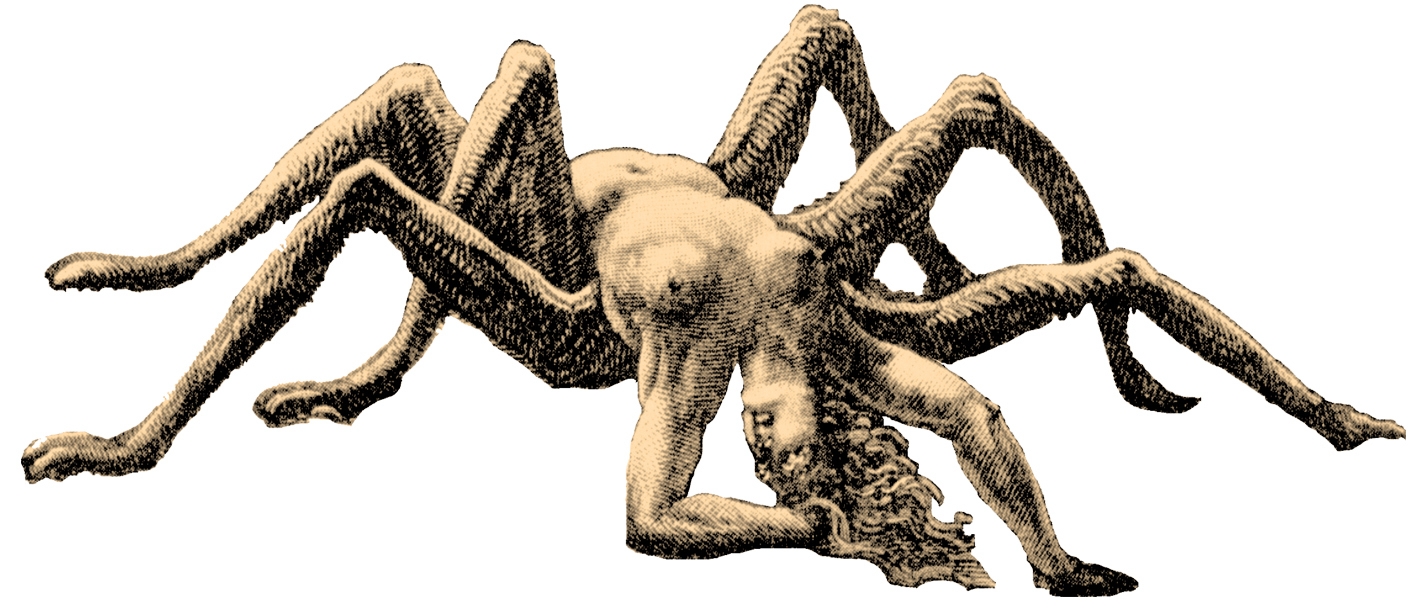
Arachne as a half-spider half-human being in Gustave Doré's 1868 illustration for Dante's Purgatorio.

In the most known and traditional version of the tale, primarily recorded in Ovid's Metamorphoses, the Lydian maiden Arachne is the (apparently brotherless) child of Idmon. An exceptional Tyrian purple dyer and weaver, she boasts of being even more talented than even Athena, the goddess of weaving. The goddess appears to her as an old woman, and advises her to respect the gods, but Arachne challenges Athena to a weaving match. Although Arachne's weaving work is without a flaw, Athena is enraged at its subject, as Arachne wove the male gods seducing and tricking mortal women. Athena rips the work to shreds, and Arachne in distress hangs herself. In pity, Athena changes her into a spider, so she can live again, and still practice her art.

But in a more obscure version, preserved by an anonymous scholiast on Nicander and attributed to Theophilus—a writer of the school of Zenodotus who lived during the third century BC—, Arachne was an Attic maiden instead who had a brother named Phalanx. Athena taught Phalanx the art of war, and Arachne the art of weaving. But when the two siblings engaged in an incestuous relationship and lay with each other, they disgusted Athena, who turned them into "animals doomed to be eaten by their own young," presumably spiders given the more popular tale and the meaning of Phalanx and Arachne's names.

== Analysis ==
=== Origins of the tale ===
Ovid's original Greek source for this tale remains unknown; it is known that he drew a lot from Nicander's now lost works for his Metamorphoses, but if he had heard of this twist in Arachne's character, he chose to omit it. Perhaps he did so because that particular version of the myth might not have been familiar enough among a predominately Roman audience. That being said, there is no evidence to suggest that Nicander himself knew about this version either.

Scholar Sarah Iles Johnston suggested that Ovid might have opted to use a Lydian myth, or perhaps one he made up himself, because in his version Arachne's punishment is directly linked to the weaving of textiles, a form of art that was already in antiquity a metaphor for storytellers, which is how Ovid presents himself in the Metamorphoses. It seems that his narrative of Athena and Arachne's combat serves as a meta-commentary on his own writing. Meanwhile, their tapestries gave Ovid another opportunity to include even more myths of transformation in the text.

=== Interpretation ===
This tale, typical of the sort of Nicander's myths that Antoninus Liberalis collected, explains how a particular animal came to be from a transformed human, but also how some of said animals' most prominent features mirror the behaviour exhibited by the humans before their eventual transformation. The main aition of this story is the explanation for the old common belief that spiders eat their mothers. Unlike Ovid's telling, which places Arachne in Asia Minor, in this version she is given a home in Attica. This is probably because, while phalangion was used everywhere to mean 'spider', the non-diminutive form phalanx was applied to spiders only in Attica.

In the story, Phalanx serves as a failed representative of Athenian young men, just as Arachne is a failed representative of Athenian maidens and their potential; weaving and military skills were seen as the proper pursuits for youth of each gender, as was a properly controlled sexual urge. Phalanx and Arachne fail not because of any lack of skill on their parts, but rather because they could not control themselves.

The male sibling being taught about the craft of war provides an aetiological connection to the phalanx (as in the military formation), while the female one being instructed in the art of weaving provides a similar connection to spiders weaving their webs. Salzman-Mitchell suggested that perhaps the moral of this myth is that masculine arts (war) should not be mixed with feminine ones (weaving).

== See also ==
- Byblis
- Gale
- Ictinus
- Proetus

== Bibliography ==
- Avery, Catherine B., ed. (1962). New Century Classical Handbook. New York, US: Appleton-Century-Crofts.
- Beekes, Robert S. P. (2010). Lucien van Beek (ed.). Etymological Dictionary of Greek. Leiden Indo-European Etymological Dictionary Series. Vol. ΙΙ. Leiden, the Netherlands: Brill Publications. ISBN 978-90-04-17419-1.
- Bell, John (1790). Bell's New Pantheon; Or, Historical Dictionary of the Gods, Demi-gods, Heroes, and Fabulous Personages of Antiquity. Vol. II. London, UK: British Library, John Bell.
- Forbes Irving, Paul M. C. (1990). Metamorphosis in Greek Myths. Clarendon Press. ISBN 0-19-814730-9.
- Graf, Fritz (2006). "Arachne". In Cancik, Hubert; Schneider, Helmuth (eds.). Brill's New Pauly. Translated by Christine F. Salazar. Columbus, OH: Brill Reference Online. doi:10.1163/1574-9347_bnp_e131080.
- Grimal, Pierre (1986). The Dictionary of Classical Mythology. Translated by A. R. Maxwell-Hyslop. Oxford, UK: Wiley-Blackwell. ISBN 0-631-13209-0.
- Hünemörder, Christian (2006). "Arachnids". In Cancik, Hubert; Schneider, Helmuth (eds.). Brill's New Pauly. Translated by Christine F. Salazar. Hamburg: Brill Reference Online. doi:10.1163/1574-9347_bnp_e1119400.
- Johnston, Sarah Iles (2009). "A New Web for Arachne". In Ueli, Dill; Walde, Christine (eds.). Antike Mythen: Medien, Transformationen und Konstruktionen. Germany: De Gruyter. ISBN 978-3-11-020909-9.
- Johnston, Sarah Iles (December 3, 2018). The Story of Myth. Cambridge, London: Harvard University Press. ISBN 978-0-674-98955-9.
- Liddell, Henry George; Scott, Robert (1940). A Greek-English Lexicon, revised and augmented throughout by Sir Henry Stuart Jones with the assistance of Roderick McKenzie. Oxford: Clarendon Press. Online version at Perseus.tufts project.
- Overduin, Floris (1977). Nicander of Colophon's Theriaca: A Literary Commentary. Leiden, the Netherlands: Brill Publications. ISBN 978-90-04-27121-0.
- Ovid (1916). Metamorphoses. Loeb Classical Library 42. Vol. I, Books 1-8. Translated by Frank Justus Miller, revised by G. P. Goold. Cambridge, MA: Harvard University Press.
- Pliny the Elder (1942). Natural History. Loeb Classical Library 352. Vol. II: Books 3-7. Translated by H. Rackham. Cambridge, MA: Harvard University Press.
- Salzman-Mitchell, Patricia B. (2005). A Web of Fantasies: Gaze, Image, and Gender in Ovid's Metamorphoses. Ohio State University Press. ISBN 0-8142-0999-8.
- Schmitz, Leonhard (1867). Smith, William (ed.). A Dictionary of Greek and Roman Biography and Mythology. London, UK: John Murray, printed by Spottiswoode and Co. Online version at the Perseus.tufts library.
