= Issa (mythology) =

Woman of Hermes

In Greek mythology, Issa (/ˈiːsɑː/; Ancient Greek: Ἴσσα, romanized: Íssa) or Isse (Ancient Greek: Ἴσση, romanized: Íssē) may refer to three people:

- Issa, daughter of Macareus, seduced by Apollo who appeared to her as a shepherd. She was usually called Amphissa.
- Issa, the eponymous nymph of Issa (Lesbos). She became the mother of the prophet Prylis by Hermes. This son predicted to the Greeks that they would take Troy by means of the Wooden Horse. She may be the daughter of King Macar and thus, possibly the sister of Mytilene, Agamede, Antissa, Arisbe, Methymna, Cydrolaus, Neandrus, Leucippus and Eresus.
- Achilles, who in some versions of Achilles on Skyros went by the alias Issa when disguised as a girl. In other versions, he was called Pyrrha or Kerkysera.
