= Arisbe (mythology) =

Greek mythical character, daughter of Merops

In Greek mythology, Arisbe (/əˈrɪzbiː/; Ancient Greek: Ἀρίσβη) or Arisba may refer to the following women:

- Arisbe, daughter of Merops of Percote, a seer. In a non-Homeric story, she married Priam, later king of Troy, and bore him a son named Aesacus. Priam subsequently divorced her in favor of Hecuba, daughter of King Dymas of Phrygia. Arisbe then married Hyrtacus, to whom she bore a son named Asius. Ephorus wrote of Arisbe as the first wife of Paris. Otherwise, the mother of Aesacus was the naiad Alexirrhoe, daughter of the river Granicus.
- Arisbe, also called Bateia, a princess as the daughter of King Teucer of Crete or of King Macareus of Lesbos. She was married to Dardanus, son of Zeus and Electra. There was a town named Arisbe in the Troad (in the northwestern part of Anatolia) and another on the island of Lesbos. Arisbe, then, may be an eponym. As daughter of Macareus, Arisbe was the probably the sister of Mytilene, Agamede, Antissa, Issa, Methymna, Cydrolaus, Neandrus, Leucippus and Eresus.

== Other use ==
- Arisbe is also the name of the residence of American philosopher Charles Sanders Peirce.
