= Antissa (mythology) =

Princess in Greek mythology

In Greek mythology, Antissa (Ancient Greek: Ἄντισσα, romanized: Ántissa) was a princess of Lesbos as the daughter of King Macar and probable sister to Methymna, Mytilene, Agamede, Arisbe and Issa. Her possible brothers were Cydrolaus, Neandrus, Leucippus and Eresus. She was the eponym of the city Antissa on the said island. In some account, Antissa was claimed to be Macareus' wife instead.
