= Las Hilanderas =

Painting by Diego Velázquez

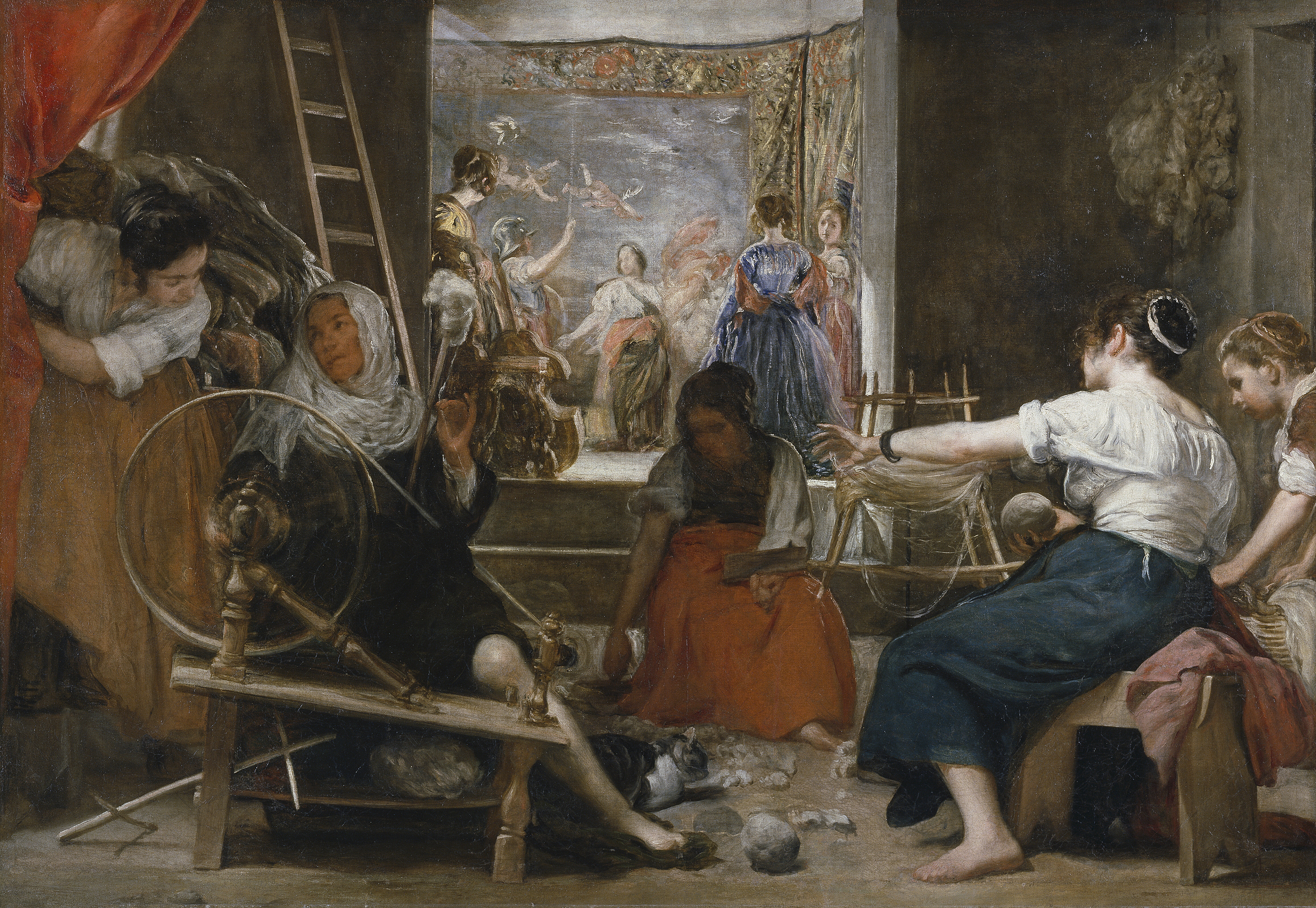
- Artist: Diego Velázquez
- Year: c. 1657
- Medium: canvas
- Dimensions: 220 cm × 289 cm (87 in × 114 in)
- Location: Museo del Prado; Madrid

Las Hilanderas (Spanish pronunciation: [las ilanˈdeɾas]; "The Spinners") is a painting by the Spanish painter Diego Velázquez, in the Museo del Prado of Madrid, Spain. It is also known by the title The Fable of Arachne. Most scholars regard it as a late work by the artist, dating from 1657 to 1658, but some argue that it was done c. 1644-48. Velázquez scholar Jonathan Brown writes that Las Hilanderas and Las Meninas are arguably Velázquez's "two greatest paintings.... [T]hey are the largest, most complicated compositions executed between 1640 and 1660, a period during which Velázquez painted mostly portraits of single figures".

Traditionally, it was believed that the painting depicted women workers in the tapestry workshop of Santa Isabel. In 1948, however, Diego Angulo observed that the iconography suggested Ovid's Fable of Arachne, the story of the mortal Arachne who dared to challenge the goddess Athena to a weaving competition and, on winning the contest, was turned into a spider by the jealous goddess. This is now generally accepted as the correct interpretation of the painting.

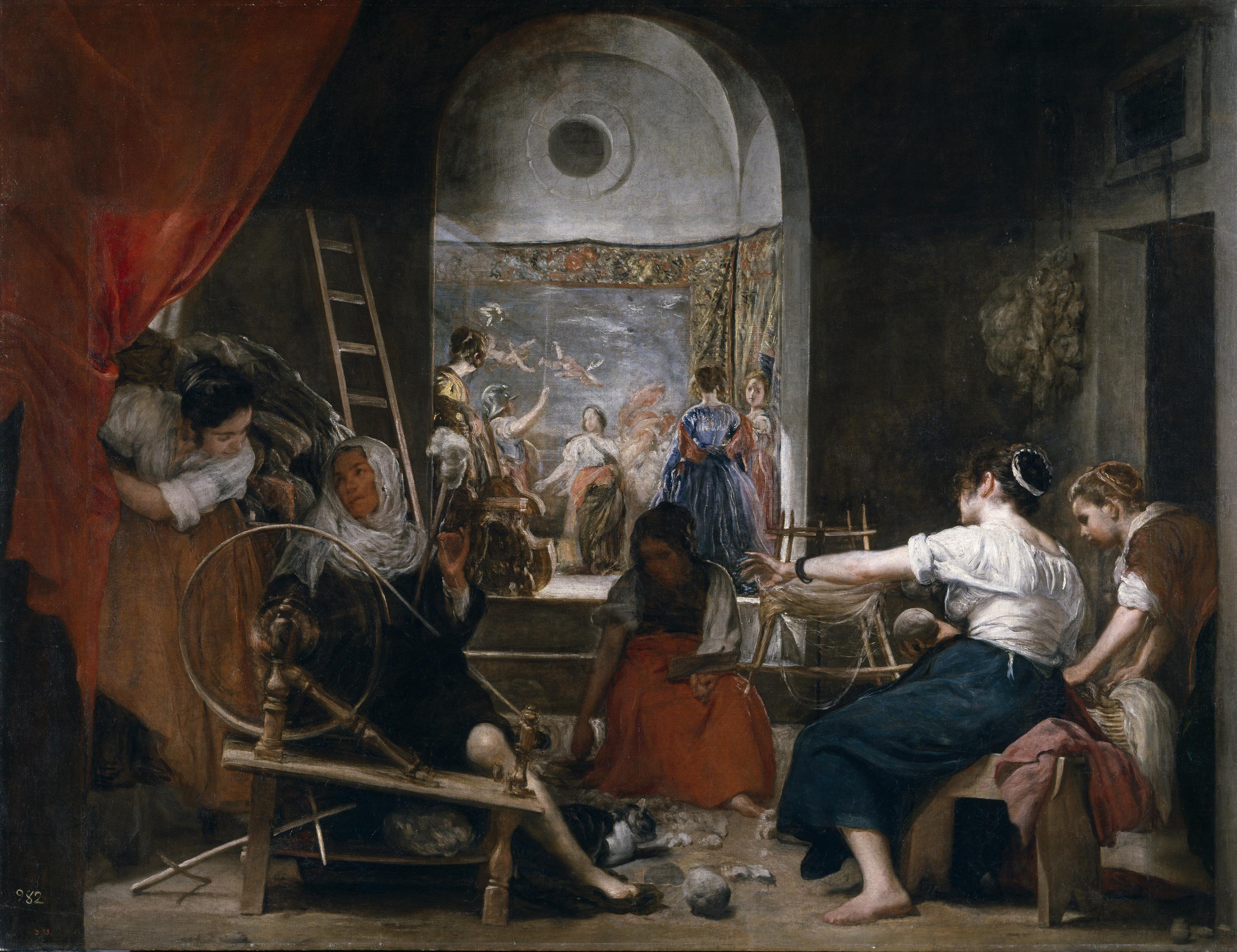
The painting as previously displayed before additions not by Velázquez were masked from view

It was painted for Don Pedro de Arce, huntsman to King Philip IV. It entered the Spanish royal collection in the eighteenth century, and was probably damaged by the fire at the Royal Alcazar of Madrid in 1734. New sections were added at the sides (37 cm in total) and over 50 cm to the top of the canvas. The painting remains at the extended size but is currently (in November 2013) displayed behind a screen with a frame added over a cut-away section revealing only the original dimensions.

Stylistic elements, such as the lightness, the economical use of paint, and the clear influence of the Italian Baroque, have led most scholars to assert that it was painted in 1657–58. Others place it between 1644 and 1648, perhaps because certain aspects of its form and content recall the bodegones Velázquez painted in his early career.

In Las Hilanderas, Velázquez developed a layered composition, an approach he had often used in his earlier bodegones, such as the Kitchen Scene with Christ in the House of Martha and Mary. In the foreground is the contest. The goddess Athena, disguised as an old woman, is on the left and Arachne, in a white top facing away from the viewer, is on the right. Three helpers assist them. In the background, a raised platform (perhaps a stage) displays the finished tapestries. The one visible to us is Arachne's, showing Titian's The Rape of Europa — another Greek myth. This is in fact a copy of Titian's painting of the subject, which was in the Spanish royal collection.

The painting has been interpreted as an allegory of the arts and even as a commentary on the range of creative endeavor, with the fine arts represented by the goddess and the crafts represented by Arachne. Others think that Velázquez' message was simply that to create great works of art, both great creativity and hard technical work are required. Other scholars have read political allegories into the work and interpreted it through popular culture.

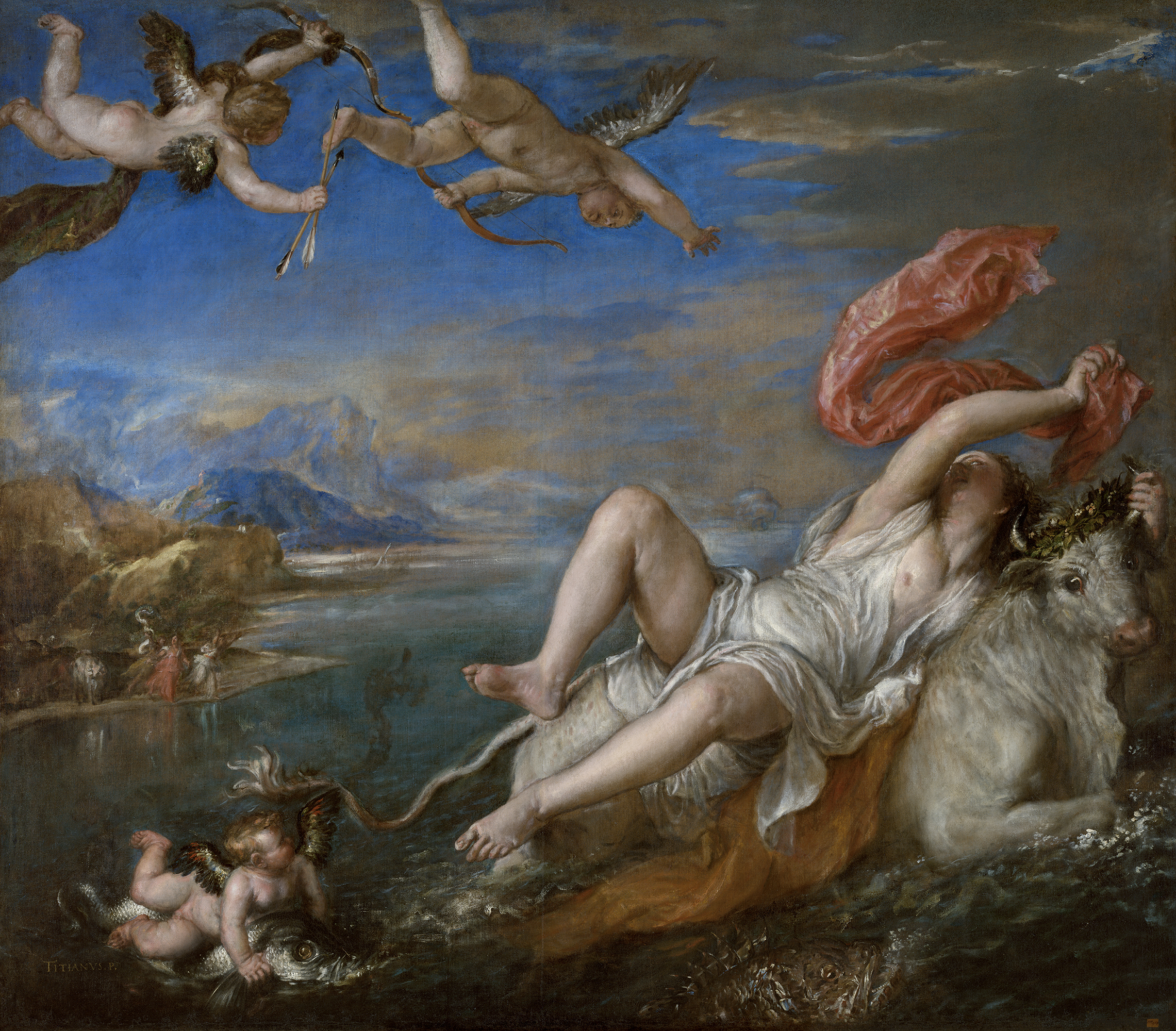
Titian's The Rape of Europa is seen in the background of the painting

== See also ==
- List of works by Diego Velázquez

== Sources ==
- Romano, Eileen (2006). Art Classics: Velázquez. ISBN 0-8478-2812-3.
- Bird, Wendy. "The Bobbin and the Distaff", Apollo, 2007-11-01
