= Arisba (Lesbos) =

Ancient city on island of Lesbos

Coordinates: 39°14′21″N 26°13′38″E

Arisba or Arisbe (Ancient Greek: Ἀρίσβη) was a town in ancient Lesbos, which Herodotus speaks of as being taken by the Methymnaei. Pliny the Elder says it was destroyed by an earthquake.

It is located near modern Arisvi. The German survey in the late 19th century created the first and only topographic plan of the visible remains, which include megaron style houses (i.e. porch and main room).
