= Joseph Morton Ransdell =

Joseph Morton Ransdell (1931–2010) was an associate professor of philosophy from 1974 to 2000 at Texas Tech University in Lubbock, Texas. A native of Oklahoma City, Oklahoma, Ransdell in 1961 received his Bachelor of Arts degree in philosophy from San Francisco State University in San Francisco, California. He subsequently obtained his Ph.D. in philosophy from Columbia University in New York City, where he wrote his dissertation on Peirce. Before coming to Texas Tech, Ransdell taught philosophy at the University of California, Santa Barbara in Santa Barbara and then spent a year in San Luis Potosí, Mexico, to write his book Pursuit of Wisdom. He wrote chiefly about Charles Sanders Peirce and his theory of representation. He was also interested in Socrates and the Socratic Plato. He was president of the Charles S. Peirce Society in 1999 and has been published in journals such as The Journal of Philosophy, Semiotica, Ètudes Phénoménologiques, Transactions of the Charles S. Peirce Society (table of contents), and SEED Journal, and in various anthologies. (See Charles Sanders Peirce bibliography#Ransdell.).

Among Peirce scholars Ransdell is identified with the view that Peirce's views underwent development but not a radical shift, and that Peirce's 1867 "On a New List of Categories" is foundational for all of Peirce's subsequent philosophical work. On this see in particular Ransdell's "T. L. Short on Peirce's Semeiotic" in Transactions v. 43, n. 4, fall 2007 (Eprint).

Ransdell originated and maintained a large Website Arisbe: The Peirce Gateway and, since 1993, the peirce-l philosophical forum, with four hundred members from three dozen countries, for those interested in Peirce's philosophy.
