= Pyrrha (Lesbos) =

Coordinates: 39°09′38″N 26°17′11″E

Pyrrha or Pyrra (Ancient Greek: Πύρρα) was a town on the coast of the deep bay on the west of the island of Lesbos, which had so narrow an entrance that it was called the Euripus of Pyrrha. It was situated at a distance of 80 stadia from Mytilene and 100 from Cape Malea. In the Lesbian revolt the town sided with Mytilene, but was reconquered by Paches. In Strabo's time the town no longer existed, but the suburbs and port were still inhabited. Pliny the Elder reports that Pyrrha had been swallowed up by the sea.

The site of Pyrrha is located near modern Megale Limne.
