= Kenneth Laine Ketner =

American philosopher

Education
- Education: University of California at Santa Barbara

Philosophical work
- Era: 21st century Philosophy
- Region: Western philosophy
- School: Pragmatism
- Institutions: Texas Tech University

Kenneth Laine Ketner is an American philosopher. He is Paul Whitfield Horn Professor, Charles Sanders Peirce Interdisciplinary Professor and Director of Institute for Studies in Pragmaticism, Texas Tech University.

== Books ==
- A Comprehensive Bibliography of the Published Works of Charles Sanders Peirce with a Bibliography of Secondary Studies, Bowling Green State University, 1986 (Bibliographies of Famous Philosophers)
- Elements of Logic: An Introduction to Peirce's Existential Graphs, Texas Tech University Press, 1990
- (ed., with Hilary Putnam), Charles Sanders Peirce: Reasoning and the Logic of Things: The Cambridge Conferences Lectures of 1898, Harvard University Press, 1992 (Harvard Historical Studies)
- (ed.) Charles Sanders Peirce: Reasoning and the Logic of Things, Harvard University Press, 1992
- Patrick H. Samway (ed.), A Thief of Peirce: The Letters of Kenneth Laine Ketner and Walker Percy, University Press of Mississippi, 1995
- (ed.) Peirce and Contemporary Thought: Philosophical Inquiries, Fordham University Press, 1995 (American Philosophy)
- His Glassy Essence: An Autobiography of Charles Sanders Peirce, Vanderbilt University Press, 1998 (The Vanderbilt Library of American Philosophy)
