= Think (journal) =

Think: Philosophy for Everyone
- Discipline: Philosophy
- Language: English
- Edited by: Stephen Law

Publication details
- History: 2002–present
- Publisher: Cambridge University Press (United Kingdom)
- Frequency: Triannually

Standard abbreviations
- ISO 4: Think

Indexing
- ISSN: 1477-1756 (print); 1755-1196 (web)
- LCCN: 2009242016
- OCLC no.: 847062727

Links
- Journal homepage

Think: Philosophy for Everyone is an academic journal created to forge a direct link between philosophy and the general public. The central aim of the journal is to provide easily accessible and engaging writing by philosophers pre-eminent in their fields to a wide audience, unimpeded by academic jargon and technicality. The journal is sponsored by the Royal Institute of Philosophy in London and published by Cambridge University Press. Think's editor is Stephen Law (since 2002).

Think expressly aims to counter the popular impression that philosophy is pointless and wholly detached from everyday life. It also aims to expose some of the "bad philosophy" that currently passes as accepted wisdom, and offers contemporary philosophers the chance to help nurture and encourage philosophers of the next generation.

Alvin Plantinga, Duncan Pritchard, Luke Muehlhauser, Nick Bostrom, Margaret A. Boden, Julian Savulescu, Brian D. Earp, William Hare, Gerald Gaus, Antony Flew, Brad Hooker, Fred Dretske, Nigel Warburton, Jenny Teichman, Richard Dawkins, Mary Midgley, Simon Blackburn, Mary Warnock, and Stephen Law are among the journal's contributors.

== Abstracting and indexing ==
The journal is abstracted and indexed in:

- SCImago Journal Rank
- Emerging Sources Citation Index
- Scopus
- Philosopher's Index
- MLA International Bibliography
- European Reference Index for the Humanities and Social Sciences (ERIH PLUS)

== Editorial board ==
- Ben Colburn
- David Edmonds
- Fiona Ellis
- John Haldane
- Beth Lord
- Lucy O'Brien
- Lea Salje
- Constantine Sandis
- Sarah Sawyer
- James Wilson
- Rachael Wiseman

== See also ==
- Café Philosophique
- Philosophy For All
- Philosophy Now
- Pub Philosophy
- Society for Philosophical Inquiry
- Socrates Cafe
