= Café Scientifique =

Social gathering

- Formation: 1998
- Purpose: Educational, entertainment
- Region served: Worldwide
- Website: http://www.cafescientifique.org

Café Scientifique currently exists in more than 60 towns and cities across the United Kingdom and world-wide. It was the idea of Duncan Dallas, from Leeds, who was impressed by a Café Philosophique session he saw in France. Café Scientifique is a place where, for the price of a cup of coffee or a glass of wine, anyone can come to explore the latest ideas in science and technology. Meetings take place in cafes, bars, restaurants and even theatres, but always outside a traditional academic context. The British Council has helped popularise Café Scientifique in several countries around the globe. Events tend to be independently run by local organisers in many cities using variations of the "Café Scientifique" or "Science Café" name.

== Format ==
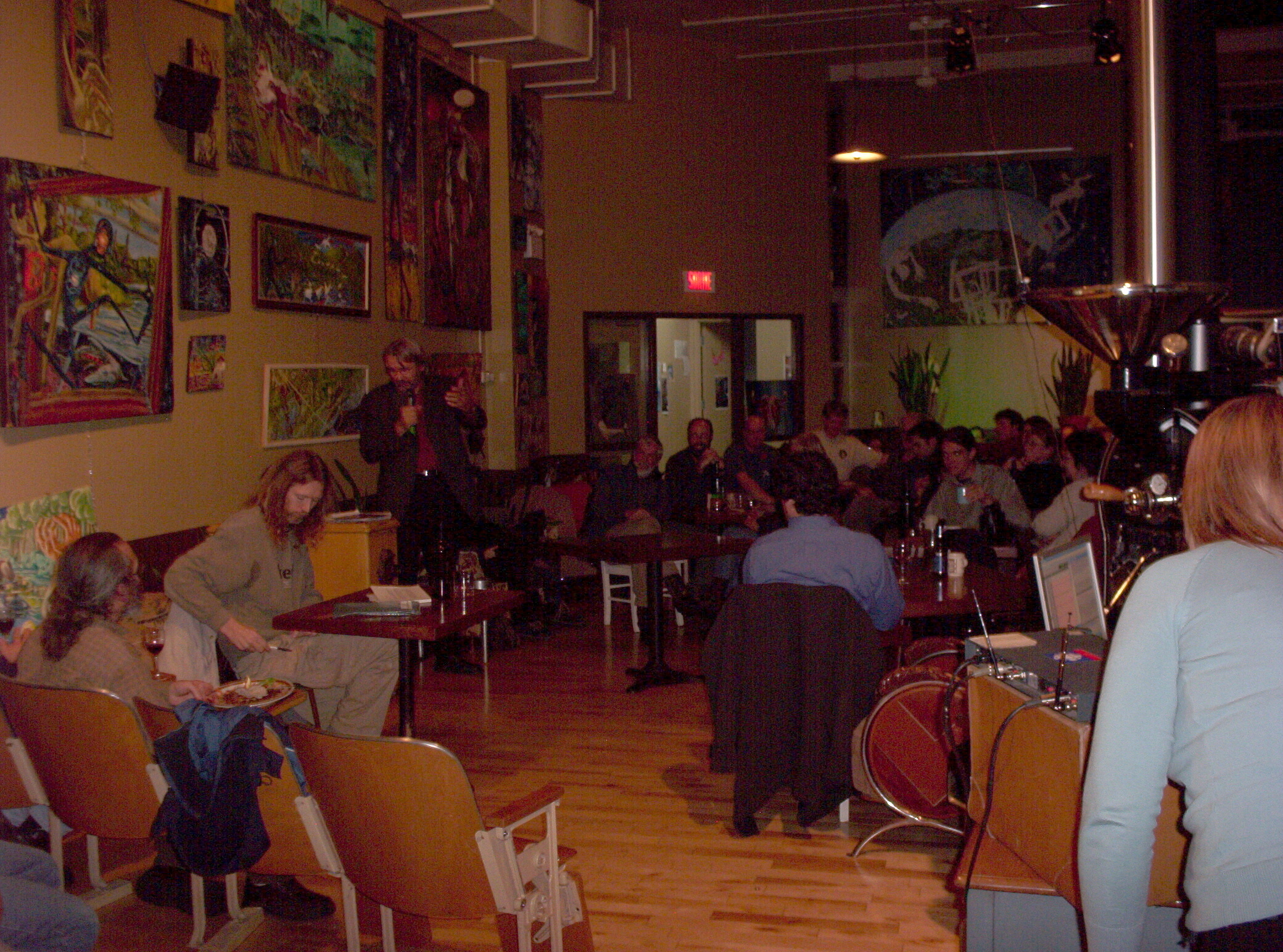
A 2002 Café Scientifique session in Chicoutimi, Quebec.

Typically, one monthly evening meeting is organised in a non-academic space such as a café or bar to which one or several scientists are invited to talk about their work in a topical or even controversial area. In Britain, most cafes follow a simple format in which the speaker introduces the topic, typically for 15–20 minutes, then there is a short break, followed by a longer period of questions and discussion. Typically, speakers do not use presentation software.

Cafés aim to engage people in a conversation about the issues in science and technology that affect our lives and promote the cultural examination of science. Cafés are known for their informal and friendly atmosphere, and are believed to improve the image of scientists and careers in science.

In Britain there is usually one speaker, in Denmark there are two (one non-scientist) and in France often four (as well as a band in the interval). In Japan, society demands more respect should be shown to older people and those in positions of authority, so questions and opinions are sent by SMS onto a big screen, so that no one knows the age of the commentator. In Africa, topics are down-to-earth – how to live with HIV, avoid malaria or understand water purification – and empower non-scientists to more comfortably and accurately assess science and technology issues, particularly those that impact on social policy making.

== History ==
The first Café Scientifique in the UK was organised by Duncan Dallas in Leeds in 1998, but is based on the Café Philosophique movement which the philosopher Marc Sautet (1947–1998) started in France in 1992. In the same year, the first café was started in France. In the UK, most cafés are run by volunteer organisers but this varies in other countries. In the UK, most cafés do not receive any institutional or government funding; many pay the speaker's travelling expenses by asking for donations from the audience. So cafés provide the opportunity for individuals and groups to experiment with different forms of engagement – street science, comedy, music, theatrical readings, dancing, demonstration, etc.

In the UK in the late 90s, the Committee on the Public Understanding of Science (organised by the Royal Society and the British Association for the Advancement of Science), thought that the public did not understand science and needed to be better educated and lectured to. Newspapers considered it very odd that people should go to a café, drink wine and discuss science rather than just gossip. However the public were becoming more concerned about topics such as Mad Cow Disease, GM crops, cloning, etc. As the context has changed since the late 90s, Café Scientifique has responded to the move from Public Understanding through Science Communication to Public Engagement with Research. When it started, Café Scientifique was considered odd and avant-garde, however the format has since been embraced by academic disciplines, government departments, research institutes, politicians, educators and policy makers.

Between 2003 and 2005, Café Scientifique in the UK received grant funding from the Wellcome Trust. The Trust later supported a project to support cafés in UK schools (Junior Café Scientifique) and in schools in Uganda. Pupils were encouraged to choose the subjects they would like to discuss, and to organise, advertise and chair the cafés.

There have been efforts to take cafés beyond towns and cities – to the countryside (such as Montana in the US and Cockermouth in the Lake District (UK), to islands (Corfu in Greece and Orkney in Scotland), to politically sensitive areas (Palestine) and to under-served communities (ethnic minority communities in the UK and gypsy communities in Hungary).

== Philosophy ==
Although Café Scientifique is an idea rather than a particular place, the location is considered important to keep the atmosphere conversational rather than lecture-style. Cafés are relaxed, in contrast with a more formal lecture hall setting and everyone attending is given equal respect. The aim of the Café Scientifique is, according to author and neurologist Oliver Sacks "to bring science back into culture". Whereas science is often seen as boring, difficult and mathematical, the aim of the Café Scientifique is to make science relevant, powerful and important, addressing topics such as the universe, climate change, gene mapping and how human brains function.

== Current developments ==
The Internet has supported the expansion of cafés. The main website provides support for new organisers around the world and individual cafés are using their websites to expand their audience and prolong the discussion.

In Melbourne, a recent development is 'Campfires and Science' – built on the same principles, but gathering people around the familiar setting of a campfire to learn, share ideas and get involved in doing science. By organising trips into the forest and other wilderness area, the movement hopes to bridge the gap between metropolitan areas and rural areas by encouraging the public to get involved in doing science themselves, such as surveying species and mapping using drones.

== See also ==
- British Association for the Advancement of Science
- British Council
- Café Psychologique
- Green Drinks
- dorkBot
- Nerd Nite
- Science festival
- Science on Tap
- Science outreach
- SkeptiCamp
