= Philosophy For All =

London-based association

Philosophy For All (PFA) is a London-based association of people interested in philosophy, founded in 1998 to bridge the gap between professional and amateur philosophers by holding talks, lectures and debates. Many of its events are held in pubs, and others in adult education colleges.

According to its website, its aims are "to encourage philosophical debate between professional and non-professional philosophers in a non-technical way; to provide a forum for an active exchange of ideas and information; to give guidance and information concerning courses as well as relevant literature in philosophy; to inspire those interested in philosophy to develop their interest further."

PFA is believed to be the largest philosophy organisation in London. Its biannual Public Lecture is often attended by more than 100 people, and its monthly Kant's Cave talks, often given by notable academics, regularly draw around 70 people to a room above a pub in Euston.

During the early years of the new millennium, PFA organised a series of Round Table debates where four leading philosophers and audiences of around 150 people debated issues such as the relationship between science and philosophy.

The PFA Public Lectures are a series of lectures held about every six months (from 2003 onwards) where a well-known thinker gives a lecture and then has a discussion session with the audience. The lectures give members of the public the opportunity to question and discuss with internationally-known philosophers, who have included Simon Blackburn, Antony Flew, Piers Benn, Jonathan Glover, Anthony Grayling, Ted Honderich, Moshe Machover, Nicholas Maxwell, Mary Margaret McCabe, Mary Midgley, David Papineau, Janet Radcliffe Richards, Barry C. Smith, Jonathan Wolff, Raymond Tallis, and Colin Wilson.

Other regular monthly Philosophy For All events include a philosophy film club, seminars on important philosophical texts, and regular Philosophical Walks in the countryside around London.

== PFA Fargo-Moorhead ==
Since 2003, Philosophy For All has had a US chapter based in the twin cities of Fargo, North Dakota and Moorhead, Minnesota. Founded by Dr Mark Chekola, it meets monthly at the Plains Art Museum in Fargo. Philosophy For All Fargo-Moorhead website

== See also ==
- Café Philosophique
- Lincoln Philosophy Café
- Pub Philosophy
- Philosophy Now
- Socrates Cafe
- Society for Philosophical Inquiry
- Think journal
- Viennese café
