= Thelma Z. Lavine =

American philosopher

- Born: Thelma Zeno Lavine; February 12, 1915; Boston, Massachusetts, U.S.
- Died: January 28, 2011 (aged 95); Washington, D.C., U.S.
- Spouse: Jerome J. Sachs (m. 1944; died 1984)

Education
- Education: Radcliffe College (BA); Harvard University (MA, PhD)
- Academic advisors: C. I. Lewis Ralph Barton Perry, David Prall

Philosophical work
- Era: 20th-century philosophy
- Region: Western philosophy
- School: Pragmatism; Naturalism
- Institutions: Wells College; Brooklyn College; University of Maryland, College Park; George Washington University; George Mason University
- Main interests: Epistemology, sociology of knowledge, philosophy of social science, philosophy of history
- Notable works: From Socrates to Sartre: The Philosophic Quest (1984)

Thelma Zeno Lavine (1915–2011), was an American philosopher, professor, and writer, specializing mainly in the areas of 19th and 20th century, especially the writing of John Dewey. She taught courses that highlighted the correlation between philosophy and other topics such as economics, history, literature, and contemporary American culture.

== Personal life ==
Thelma Z. Lavine was born in Boston, Massachusetts on February 12, 1915. Lavine attended Radcliffe College, where she earned a B.A. in 1936. In 1937 she attended Harvard University, where she earned a master's degree in philosophy. Lavine went on to earn a PhD in philosophy and psychology from Harvard in 1939. At Harvard, she studied under C. I. Lewis, Ralph Barton Perry and David Prall.

In 1944, Lavine married Washington attorney, Jerome J. Sachs. They were married for 40 years, and had one daughter, Margaret V. Sachs of Atlanta, Georgia. She died at the age of 95 on January 28, 2011 in Washington, D.C.

== Career ==
Lavine began teaching philosophy and psychology courses in 1941 at Wells College in Aurora, New York, where she remained until 1943. In 1946 she started at Brooklyn College as a professor of philosophy until 1951. From 1955 until 1965, Lavine held a faculty position at the University of Maryland. In 1965 Lavine went to George Washington University to become Elton Professor of Philosophy, where she taught for 20 years. In 1985, Lavine became a Robinson Professor of Philosophy at George Mason University, and remained at George Mason until her retirement in 1998. Lavine received the "Outstanding Faculty Member" award while at the University of Maryland and the "Outstanding Professor" award during her time at George Washington University.

== Writing and lectures ==
Lavine's writing and lectures concern a variety of topics including, "the ideas of the Founding Fathers, Judaic thought, women's studies, and biomedical ethics." Some of her areas of specialty include 19th and 20th century continental philosophy, interpretation theory, and sociology of knowledge, American philosophy, and American culture. Despite her variety of interests, American philosophy became her major area of inquiry, especially pragmatism and the writing of John Dewey, and also Charles S. Peirce, C. I. Lewis, Morris R. Cohen, John H. Randall Jr., and John J. McDermott.

Lavine is an internationally known writer, and she has been published abroad in several countries, including Germany, Japan, and the Netherlands. One of Levine's earliest essays, "Naturalism and the Sociological Analysis of Knowledge," was included in Naturalism and the Human Spirit (1944), by Yervant H. Krikorian. The book also included essays by other noteworthy American philosophers such as John Dewey, and Sidney Hook. In the article, Lavine conveys her attitude towards Dewey's philosophy and identifies him as the, "vanguard of twentieth-century naturalism."

"What is the Method of Naturalism?," is an article written by Lavine that was published in the February 1953 edition of the Journal of Philosophy. This article examines "naturalistic philosophy's cultivation through the creation of relations between philosophic inquiry and other areas of study. In addition to her work on the topic of Naturalism, Lavine also wrote about the historical development of Western philosophy. She is well known for the televised lecture series From Socrates to Sartre, A Historical Introduction to Philosophy, put on by the Maryland Center for Public Broadcasting in 1979. The series comprised thirty lectures, and it has been praised for making philosophy accessible to the public. Lavine's most famous publication, From Socrates to Sartre: The Philosophic Quest (1984), grew out of the televised lectures, over 250,000 copies were published in the United States and it was also translated into Japanese.

Another notable publication of Lavine's is the essay, "The Contemporary Significance of the American Philosophic Tradition: Lockean and Redemptive," from Reading Dewey, Interpretations for a Postmodern Generation (1998), by Larry A. Hickman. In the essay, Lavine articulates the progression of philosophic thought beginning with an evaluation of Enlightenment principles and their role in the development of the national and legal identity of the United States. She then explains the correlation of Lockean Enlightenment ideas and American modernity conflicts with Dewey's mode of redemption. Lavine explains Dewey as being the, "most sensitive…to the countercurrents of modernity and the challenge of their unification, which would lead to realizing the goal of redemption," Lavine holds that the, "contemporary significance of the American philosophic tradition is that among all remaining philosophies of the West, only American pragmatism addresses and seeks to theorize the contestations of modernity.

Lavine was one of the earliest American philosophers to develop the perspective on the Hermeneutic (interpretive) turn in contemporary philosophy with her early studies "Knowledge as Interpretation" published in 1950. These essays were reworked in an extensive study with Victorino Tejera in the volume History and Anti-History in Philosophy.

Lavine's original contribution to American philosophical naturalism was advanced in her article "Modernity and the Spirit of Naturalism" delivered to the APA Central division in 1991. She outlined the three main components of the Naturalistic paradigm consisting of 1) The Continuity of Analysis Paradigm, 2) The Problematic Situation Paradigm, and 3) The Critique of Modernity Paradigm. This third and last paradigm is espoused by Lavine as the new model paradigm which both incorporates the earlier paradigms to interpret and appropriate the conflicting frameworks of Modernity, and "re-open the blocked path of naturalistic pragmatism". Her commitment to Naturalism was perennial.

== Organizations ==
Throughout her career as professor, Lavine was also a member of several organizations in the field of Philosophy. She was a founding member of SOPHIA (Society of Philosophers in America), the Cosmos Club in Washington, and the Society for the Advancement of American Philosophy (SAAP). She was honored by the SAAP in 2000 with the Herbert W. Schneider Award for her contributions to the understanding and development of American philosophy.
