= Café Psychologique =

Café Psychologique is a grassroots public discussion initiative where people who are interested in psychology and psychological ways of thinking meet to discuss issues that are important to them.

== Philosophy ==
Café Psychologique follows the philosophy of Café Scientifique in using invited experts and a discussion-based format to make specialist subjects accessible to a lay audience.

Café Psychologique is intended to bring the insights and methods of psychological therapies into accessible public spaces. The UK's Café Psychologique movement was set up by a group analyst and adheres to the principles of group analysis by promoting a culture where groups can meet and talk in a way that benefits the participants and promotes psychological well-being.

== Format ==
The café-based format is a combination of world café and Café Philosophique or Pub Philosophy.

Visiting experts introduce a theme for the session, and then participants discuss issues surrounding the theme as a large group. Guest therapists and psychologists participate in the discussions as invited.

== History ==
The UK's first Café Psychologique started in 2011 and meets in the Severn Arts Centre, Leeds. Other UK Café Psychologiques include Liverpool, Wolverhampton and Manchester. There is also a Cafe Psychologique in Sydney, Australia.

== See also ==
- Café philosophique
- Collective intelligence
- Group analysis
- Public awareness of science
- Pub Philosophy
