= Philosophical Library =

American book publisher (established 1941)

- Founded: 1941 (85 years ago)
- Founder: Dagobert D. Runes
- Country of origin: United States
- Headquarters location: New York City, U.S.
- Publication types: Books
- Nonfiction topics: Psychology; philosophy; religion; history
- Imprints: The Wisdom Library
- Official website: philosophicallibrary.com

Philosophical Library is an American publisher based in New York City. Since the company's founding in 1941, it has specialized in publishing books about philosophy, psychology, religion, and history.

== History and operations ==
Dagobert D. Runes was a Romanian-born philosopher and scholar who emigrated to the U.S. in 1926. Over the next fifteen years, he befriended many European intellectuals in America's émigré community, some of whom had fled religious or political persecution. According to Rick Lewis in a Philosophy Now article, "Runes knew almost everyone in émigré circles, and hit on the idea of publishing books by the brilliant European exiles he knew." Runes was particularly close to Albert Einstein and thought it fitting to publish his works in the U.S. As such, Runes established the New York City-based Philosophical Library publishing house in 1941. The company soon expanded its portfolio of authors beyond European immigrants to include works by a wide assortment of philosophers, scientists, and theologians.

After Runes died in 1982, Philosophical Library continued operations, first with his widow Rose Morse Runes serving as general manager, and then into the 21st century under the direction of his daughter Regeen Runes Najar.

=== Portfolio ===
Philosophical Library has published works by twenty-two Nobel Prize winners and other prominent figures, including Einstein, Arnold Schoenberg, Max Planck, Bertrand Russell, John Dewey, Jean-Paul Sartre, Simone de Beauvoir, Paramahansa Yogananda, Khalil Gibran, André Gide, Martin Heidegger, and Albert Schweitzer. The company has also curated and published anthologies, such as those themed around Buddhist philosophy or continental philosophy.

Among Philosophical Library's best-selling books are Gibran's Tears and Laughter (1946), Planck's Scientific Autobiography and Other Papers (1949), Einstein's Out of My Later Years (1950), and Sartre's Being and Nothingness (1956).

In the late 1940s, the company formed an imprint called the Wisdom Library that published a series of philosophical and religious books, such as Henri Bergson's The Creative Mind (1946), Jean Wahl's A Short History of Existentialism (1949), and Gibran's The Procession (1958).

Starting in the 2010s, Philosophical Library adopted cost-reduction techniques, for example, publishing classics from its catalog as e-books, and offering a "print-on-demand" service in which it only prints individual copies of books in response to customer orders.
