= Victorino Tejera =

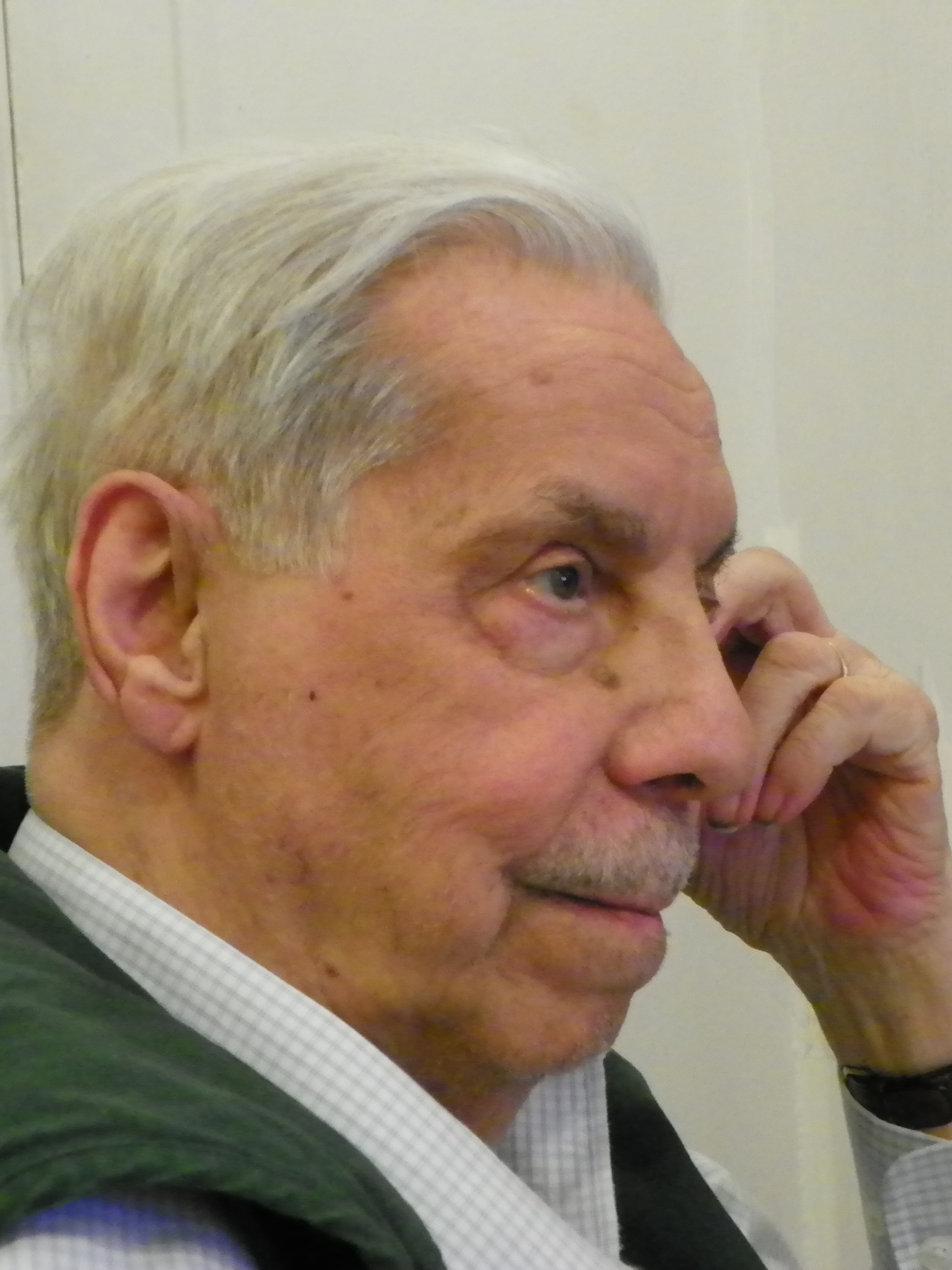
- Victorino Tejera
- Born: Victorino Tejera-Márquez; November 2, 1922; Venezuela
- Died: August 25, 2018 (aged 95); New York City
- Spouse: Gertraud P. Tejera

Education
- Education: Columbia University (BA, PhD)
- Academic advisors: J.H. Randall Jr., Justus Buchler

Victorino Tejera (born Tejera Márquez; November 2, 1922 – August 25, 2018) was a writer, scholar, and professor of philosophy with specializations in ancient Greek thought, Metaphysics, Aesthetics, and American philosophy (Naturalism, Semiotics). He was born in Caracas, Venezuela. He is known especially for his writing on Plato's Dialogues. Many scholars believe Tejera's work in this area is his most valuable contribution to philosophy (see Notes and Further reading). He was editor and contributor with Thelma Lavine on History and Anti-History in Philosophy (1989, 2012) whose From Socrates to Sartre (1984) was the basis for the PBS series of the same name.

His grandfather was the President of Venezuela, Victorino Marquez Bustillos, his great uncle was the Venezuelan writer and historian Felipe Tejera, and cousin to Enrique Tejera París.

== Early life, education and diplomacy ==
Tejera attended St. Mary's College in Southampton, England, a boarding school, from 1930 to 1938, receiving his Matriculate (university entry status certificate) in London in 1939. He received a fellowship to study at Columbia University in the U.S., completing his Bachelor of Arts degree at the undergraduate college in philosophy (Phi Beta Kappa) in 1948 and his doctorate at the graduate school in philosophy in 1956 with a dissertation on "Philosophy and the Art of Poetry". He also completed his docente (teacher's training) at the Central University of Venezuela in 1951.

In his early career, Tejera held the following diplomatic posts:

- United Nations Secretariat, NY (Linguistic Consultant, 1946–49). He engaged in the first simultaneous translations from French and Spanish to English. He served under UN Secretary Trygve Lie performing simultaneous translations from French and Spanish into English. Tejera and George L. Sherry (Shershevsky) held the first positions at the UN for simultaneous translations, Sherry did the Russian translation.
- Co-director of Information Services; Third Secretary, Embassy of Venezuela, Washington, DC, 1951 to 1954.
- Vice-Consul of Venezuela, New Orleans, Louisiana, 1954 to 1955.
- Editorial Assistant Editor for the Las Americas Organization of American States (OAS), Washington DC, 1955 and 1956.

== Intellectual influences and academic career ==
=== Years at Columbia ===
As a student at Columbia University, some of the principal teachers and direct influences on his work included the renowned intellectual and cultural historians John H. Randall Jr., Justus Buchler, Irwin Edman, Jacques Barzun, While a PhD candidate, he was graduate assistant to Irwin Edman. He counts Andrew Chiappe, Alan Willard Brown, and Quentin Anderson all among his other outstanding teachers at Columbia.

His early philosophic passion was Greek Philosophy, and he received instruction in Classical Greek from Fred Householder. He studied History of Philosophy, Aesthetics, and Literary Theory. He also attended summer sessions in the late 1940s at the Kenyon School of English. He was profoundly affected by the writings of John Dewey and George Santayana, as well as by the work and literature of the New Critics John Crowe Ransom, His art and literary interests in New York City enabled encounters with noted artists, writers, and poets of the beat generation such as Allen Ginsberg, Jack Kerouac, Fritz Stern, and artist Jacob Kainen, with whom he formed an enduring friendship. He was identified as the character 'Victor Villanueva' in Kerouac's On the Road, a Latin American poet. Tejera published and translated poems as well.

A portrait of a mid-century gathering at Columbia University with Tejera was published in Fritz Stern's autobiography including the authors, and republished in the New York Times.

=== Academic highlights ===
Above all, Tejera felt strongly influenced by Justus Buchler's metaphysics of literary art (metaphysics of human production) and the exhibitive nature of philosophy reflected in Buchler's Metaphysics of Natural Complexes and The Main of Light. The influence of Buchler is one of the most apparent in Tejera's published works. Buchler was his dissertation adviser at Columbia when he wrote Philosophy and the Art of Poetry (1956), and longtime colleague and correspondent.

Tejera lectured in history at Georgetown University from 1951 to 1954, and then taught philosophy at Rensselaer Polytechnic from 1956 to 1960, Farleigh Dickinson University 1960 to 1961, and Howard University from 1961 to 1966. Afterward he accepted a permanent position of Professor of Philosophy and Comparative Literature at the State University of New York (SUNY) campus at Stony Brook. He was conferred the title of Stony Brook University Professor of Humanities in 1991, and has since received the title of University Professor Emeritus (1996).

At Stony Brook, he taught Ancient Greek Philosophy, History of Philosophy, Aesthetics, Classical Political Philosophy, American Philosophy, Ancient Greek, Philosophy of History, and Plato's Dialogues, in a teaching career spanning 40 years.

== Research and publications ==
Tejera's extensive and varied research in the Humanities culminated in books including:

- Modes of Greek Thought (1971),
- Rewriting the History of Ancient Greek Philosophy (1997),
- Plato's Dialogues One by One: A Dialogical Interpretation, (c.1984 rev., 1999), his most widely recognized work. Stemming from the Columbia University Naturalist tradition (cf. Andrew J. Reck The New American Philosophers, 1968) reading of Plato from Frederick J.E. Woodbridge down to J.H. Randall Jr, this original work had become an important volume of Naturalist scholarship in America on the dramatic and dialogical reading of Plato. It helped groom a new generation of Plato students, and has redirected the traditional reading plan usually associated with Plato.

He added to the arts and human sciences with:

- Art and Human Intelligence (1965),
- History as a Human Science (1984),
- Semiotics from Peirce to Barthes (1988),
- History and Anti-History in Philosophy (edited with Thelma Lavine;1989),
- Literature, Criticism and the Theory of Signs (1995), and
- American Modern: The Path Not Taken (subtitled: Aesthetics, Metaphysics and Intellectual History in Some Classic American Philosophers; 1996)

=== Contributions to Classic American philosophy ===
Tejera is the first American philosopher to apply Justus Buchler's modes of judgment to the study of history and aesthetics. Along with Beth J. Singer, Thelma Z. Lavine, and Horace S. Thayer, he helped revive interest in classic American thought via the Society for the Advancement of American Philosophy (SAAP). He renewed interest in a John Dewey's philosophy of culture with an emphasis on poetics and rhetoric, Buchler's coordinative analysis, and philosophic historiography.

He contributed to the recovery of the Semiotics of Charles Sanders Peirce, especially its application to literary theory and philosophy (Semiotics of Literature). Tejera's Semiotics books are a significant effort to mend the gap between scholars engaged in literary discourse and those who work in the social (or human) sciences and natural sciences. The central theme of art and spirituality in American philosophy permeates his Semiotics books, American Modern: The Path Not Taken, as well as later works.

His later work in American philosophy had taken two paths: (1) a theory of creative rationality via the aesthetically aware metaphysical Naturalism of Justus Buchler and Peirce's semiotics, and (2) a fuller aesthetics and poetics-oriented theory in the human sciences and in interpretation theory (Hermeneutics). His latest book, Two Metaphysical Naturalisms, serves as a companion to American Modern, dwelling on some of the practical functions of American philosophical reflection. This alignment with classic American Philosophy also contrasts with the cognitivist aesthetics of Phenomenology which turns the aesthetic object into a cognitive object while failing to recognize its dimension of feeling, or the cognitive gain available in art as art in the fullest sense which both Charles S. Peirce and Justus Buchler defend.

== Plato's Dialogues and Rewriting the History of Ancient Greek Philosophy ==
Tejera's work in Plato studies emphasizes the nature of Plato's Dialogues as the dramatized conversational encounters and communicative interactions that their design shows them to be, as well as their character as literary works of art. He attends to the tone in which Plato's Socrates addresses his interlocutors to obtain satirical effects by persistent dialogical wit, humor and irony, often missed by readers. His published works on Plato establish that the dialogues are satirical of Spartan militarism and Pythagorean intellectuality, as well as of faction (reactionary dissent, partisanship, etc.) whether democratic or oligarchical. He has advanced this line of scholarship to counter the traditionalist reading of Plato with its predilection for ethical or political propositions, and supplanted it with the Columbia University School reading of the Dialogues through their literary construction and expressive speech.

Tejera offers the argument that nothing qualifies the works of Plato as expository tracts. Rather, they give every sign of being dialogical Dialogues. That is, they are self-discovering works, highly orchestrated original queries. Instead of supporting the dogma often labeled as "Platonic Idealism," Tejera follows internal clues and self-focusing devices in examining the formative prose of the Dialogues in line with the interpretational poetics developed in his literary theory volume (Literature, Criticism, and the Theory of Signs).

Tejera's most widely recognized book Plato's Dialogues: A Dialogical Interpretation (c. 1984, updated and revised 1999) advanced the dramatic and dialogical reading of Plato which influenced and precipitated a generation of Plato studies (cf. Gerald A. Press editions in Further reading below). Tejera invented and invoked a unique notation to address the confusion in Plato scholarship to address the Socratic problem in these and other papers, to disambiguate Plato's Socrates from the Historical Socrates, Xenophon's Socrates, and the various interpretations claimed to be Plato's own views. "To keep track of the many composite Socrates, both of "the tradition" and of individual commentators, we use the label SocC, "Socrates sub upper-case C." (cf. The Philosophy of Socrates Program Guide p. 106).

=== Tejera's notations for keeping track of Socrates ===
The conventions (subscripts) he used to note the kinds of Socrates that we are liable to encounter in discussions of Greek literature and philosophy include the following:

- SocP - Plato's Socrates - as a dramatic character in Plato's Dialogues. Plato's Socrates teases or is polite, refutes or rationalizes, is logical in argument or paralogical, tells stories to his interlocutors, allusively satirizes, or suspends judgment, and appears as seeking for definitions which he then cannot accept. Plato's Socrates was inductive, interrogative, skeptical, anti-dogmatic and in that sense anti-systematic. He is also a story-teller, poet-quoter, myth-maker, punster, ironic etymologizer, and intellectually scrupulous. SocP frequently quotes the poets he is misinterpreted as hating.
- SocH - Historical Socrates - as a questioner, or knowledge seeker, a critical non-conformist, a critical seeker after truth and competence. The Socrates who claimed to know only that he did not know is both SocH and SocP. We only know a small number of facts regarding SocH. We do not know enough about SocH to state that there was any such thing as a "circle of Socrates".
- SocX - Xenophon's Socrates - based on Xenophon's testimony in his works, that Socrates is a Spartanizer, chauvinist, conventional tutor of a militarist, but not a philosopher.
- SocHc - Cicero's Socrates - based on Cicero's testimony, as in Academica I.
- SocC - Composite Socrates - the traditional Socrates that had been handed down by the Pythagorizing or Platonist tradition of Plato-interpretation. The conventional composite reading of Plato. Also, the view of Socratism (or Socraticism) associated with the composite view, often limited to the practice of interrogation and induction, or the theory of ideas as in I.M. Crombie (Doctrines), J.N. Findlay (Unwritten Doctrines), et al.
- SocC + (x) is the notation used to specify a Plato scholar. For more instances of this notation, we found SocCa for Anton's Socrates, and SocCr for Rossetti's Socrates.
- SocD - Doctrinal Socrates - Socrates derived from a literalistic reading, as advancing a system of doctrine.
- SocCn - Nietzsche's Socrates - Nietzsche's attitude to Socrates. Nietzsche had characterized Plato as a doctrinal system builder of the Idealist tradition. The aphoristic Nietzsche is anti-systematic, an anti-system builder in order to be free to question his own assumptions. Nietzsche both liked and disliked the undisambiguated SocC of the 'tradition'.
- SocDn - Nietzsche's Socrates doctrinal subscript - 'Socrates' that is found to hold different doctrines by different expositors. The Socrates that Nietzsche disliked, a composite of traits derived from Diogenes Laertius and Xenophon, a composite both a culture hero and attached to some rationalist dogmas.
- SocU - Socrates Undisambiguated - an unknown or uncritically formed Socrates. A Socrates to which fabulous predicates are attached, as in SocC. The undistributed Socrates of "the tradition". (An undistributed middle term), e.g., "Socrates was the first to discourse on the conduct of life". This label is for the complexly ambiguous, difficult to disambiguate (or not worth disambiguating) "Socrates" of much anti-dialogical writing about Socrates that fails to practice source-criticism. This "undistributed" Socrates, as in the fallacy of the undistributed middle term, because it is so often used as such. It sanctions the avoidance of distinction between SocP and SocH, or the other Socrates.
- SocLy - Socrates in the Lysis - the fictional report by Socrates himself of a conversation he once held. These are sophistical traits that are incompatible traits with SocP. An un-Socratic Socrates, using un-Socratic language.
- SocL - Diogenes Laertius's Socrates - Socrates of the Biographical tradition, which is also historically unreliable. A view of Socrates via popular beliefs, and by beliefs, doctrines, as Laertius does. Socrates as a mishmash of contradictory attributes, but some traits coincide with traits of both SocP and SocX, all hearsay good or bad recorded about Socrates.
- SocA - Aristophanes Socrates - the dramatic character in Aristophanes comedy The Clouds.
- SocAs - Strauss's Aristophanean Socrates - an interpretive construction formed in response to "the ancient quarrel between poetry and philosophy", derived from a non-dialogical reading of Plato.
- SocXs - Strauss's Xenophantean Socrates - A Socrates that is accepting of the views of Ischomachus in Xenophon. Strauss's Socrates that is in the main SocX with some traits of SocP super-added and derived from a literalist reading of both which reinforce doctrines of Plato's Laws (Laws is a "posthumous" work not by Plato himself. External and internal evidence point to it as an Academic production likely issued under the Pythagorean head of Plato's Academy Speusippos after Plato's death). Another notation, SocPs, Plato's Socrates according to Strauss.

Tejera is the first to utilize such conventions and standards of source-critical practices in the study of Greek Philosophy. It was the first substantial utility since the writing of Eric Havelock on the Socratic problem of which modern scholars were plagued, and which had ended "in a dilemma of contradiction" (Havelock).

Eric Havelock had grouped the efforts of Plato interpretation scholars among the following 1) Sceptics, Olof Gigon and Anton-Hermann Chroust, 2) Alternatives to the Sceptics, Gregory Vlastos, Terence Irwin, and Gerasimos X. Santas 3) and the Reconstructionists of Socraticism, Kenneth J. Dover and W.K.C. Gutherie. This was ushered in by the earlier and now century old tradition of Plato interpretation via the John Burnet - A.E. Taylor thesis (my terminology, and first cited in an early article by Havelock), which in effect had rendered Plato as a mere reporter of the doctrines of Socrates (Theory of Forms, Ideas), and with the middle dialogues together comprising all of the historical Socrates, SocH. These concerns are also addressed in the recent works of Charles H. Kahn which are in contradistinction with Tejera's and Havelock's works that minimize the value of the early-middle-late dialogue categorization, and the stylometrics enforced accounts. With the utility of Tejera's conventions, modern scholars have the advantage of addressing such dilemmas in a progressive and orderly fashion, whether from classicist, philosophical and historical orientations. A fuller examination and citations of these approaches may be found in the recent work of the philologist Holger Thesleff, in which he notes Tejera's observations about the dogmatic interpretations of Plato, and the "Post-Platonic dogmatization of Platonism".

=== Tejera's Naturalistic view of Aristotle ===
Tejera's three books on Aristotle (Return of the King, Two Metaphysical Naturalisms, and Aristotle in Epitome) show how Aristotle was turned into a Platonizing logician by a long series of Alexandrian, Latin and Byzantine commentators, who in turn used Aristotle as a proper "introduction to Plato", a Plato that had been Pythagorized by the academy (as an Academic reinterpretation of the dialogues) and initiated after his lifetime, in secondary literature. This long tradition of rendering Aristotle and misshaping of Plato is contested by Tejera as the dogmatic anti-dialogical and doxographical tradition of interpretation, and forms the basis of his inquiry into the pre-Scholastic Aristotle. These books help the reader to recover the Naturalist (nature-inquirer), and humanist Aristotle, lover of poetic drama.

== Honors ==
Professor Tejera was a founding member of the International Plato Society in Perugia, Italy in 1989, a member of the International Organizing Committee for the International Conference on Greek Philosophy, and was made an Honorary Citizen of Lindos, Rhodes for his work on Greek Culture in 1992. He served as Program Chair for the Committee for Aesthetics in 1968 and on the executive committee of the Long Island Philosophy Society in 1976. In 1986, he was Program Director for the Society for Advancement of American Philosophy conference honoring John H. Randall Jr., and Herbert W. Schneider.

== Bibliography ==
- Art and Human Intelligence (Appleton-Century, 1965)
- Aristotle's Analytics (American R.D.M., 1966)
- Modes of Greek Thought (Appleton-Century, 1971)
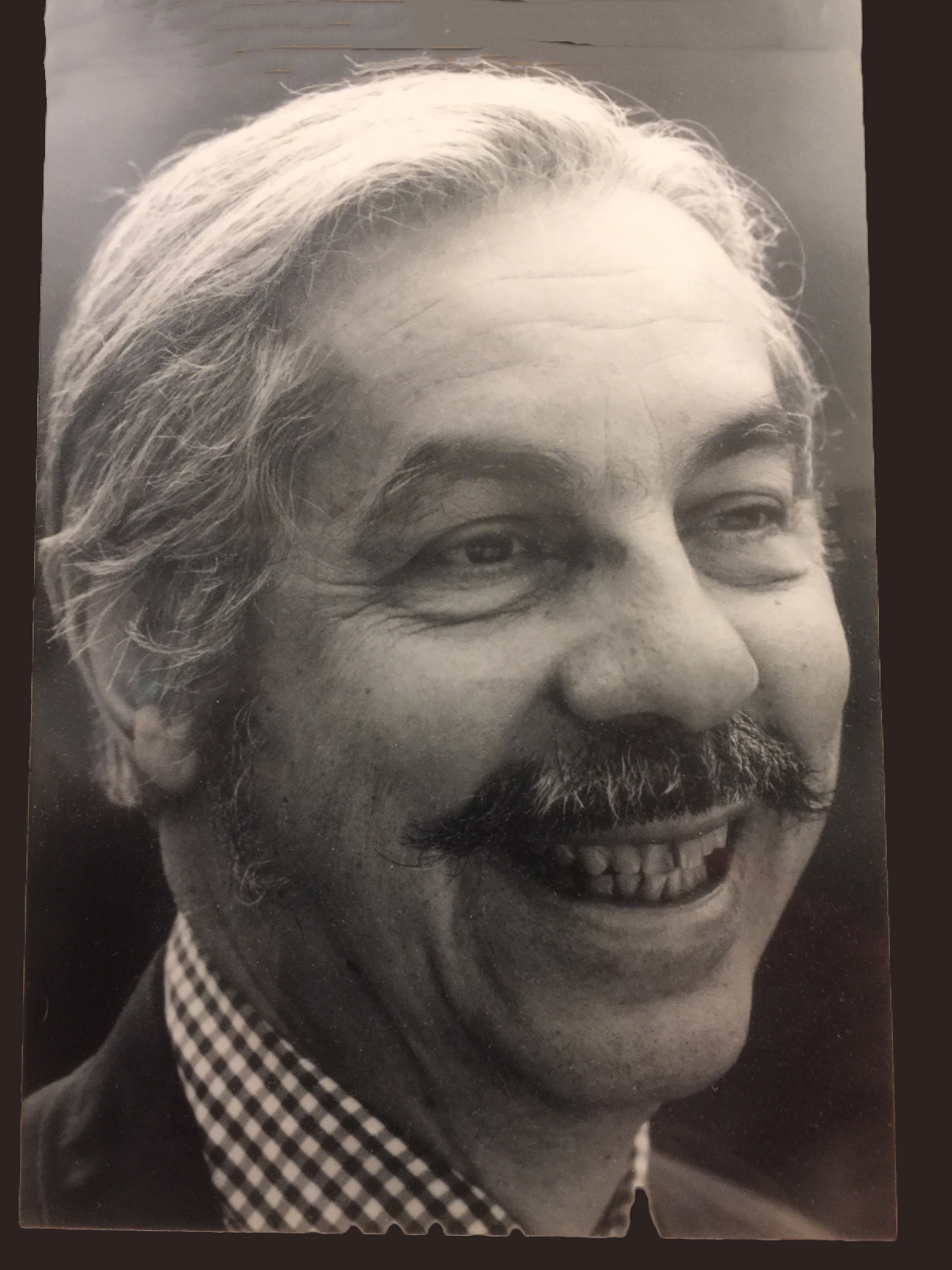
  V. Tejera
- Plato's Dialogues One by One, a Structural Interpretation (Irvington, NY, 1984)
- History as a Human Science: The Conception of History in Some Classic American Philosophers (Lanham: U.P.A., 1984)
- The City-State Foundations of Western Political Thought (1984; Lanham: U.P.A., 2nd edition 1993)
- Nietzsche and Greek Thought (Dordrecht: Nijhoff, 1987)
- Semiotics from Peirce to Barthes: An Introduction to the Study of Communication, Interpretation, and Expression (Leiden: Brill, 1988)
- History and Anti-History in Philosophy (ed. with T. Lavine (Dordrecht: Kluwer, 1989))
- Literature, Criticism, and the Theory of Signs (Philadelphia: J. Benjamins, 1995)
- Aristotle's Tool-Kit: The Poetics, the Rhetoric, the Analytics (E. Mellen Press, 1996)
- American Modern: The Path Not Taken - Aesthetics, Metaphysics and Intellectual History in Classic American Philosophy (Rowman Littlefield, 1996)
- Plato's Dialogues: The Dialogical Approach (Edwin Mellen Press, 1997)
- Rewriting the History of Ancient Greek Philosophy (Greenwood Publishers, 1997)
- The Return of the King: The Intellectual Warfare over Democratic Athens (University Press of America, 1998)
- Plato's Dialogues One By One: A Dialogical Interpretation (University Press of America, 1999)
- Two Metaphysical Naturalisms - Aristotle and Justus Buchler, edited by Atila Bayat (Lexington Books, 2015)
