= Stephen Law =

British philosopher

Stephen Law FRSA
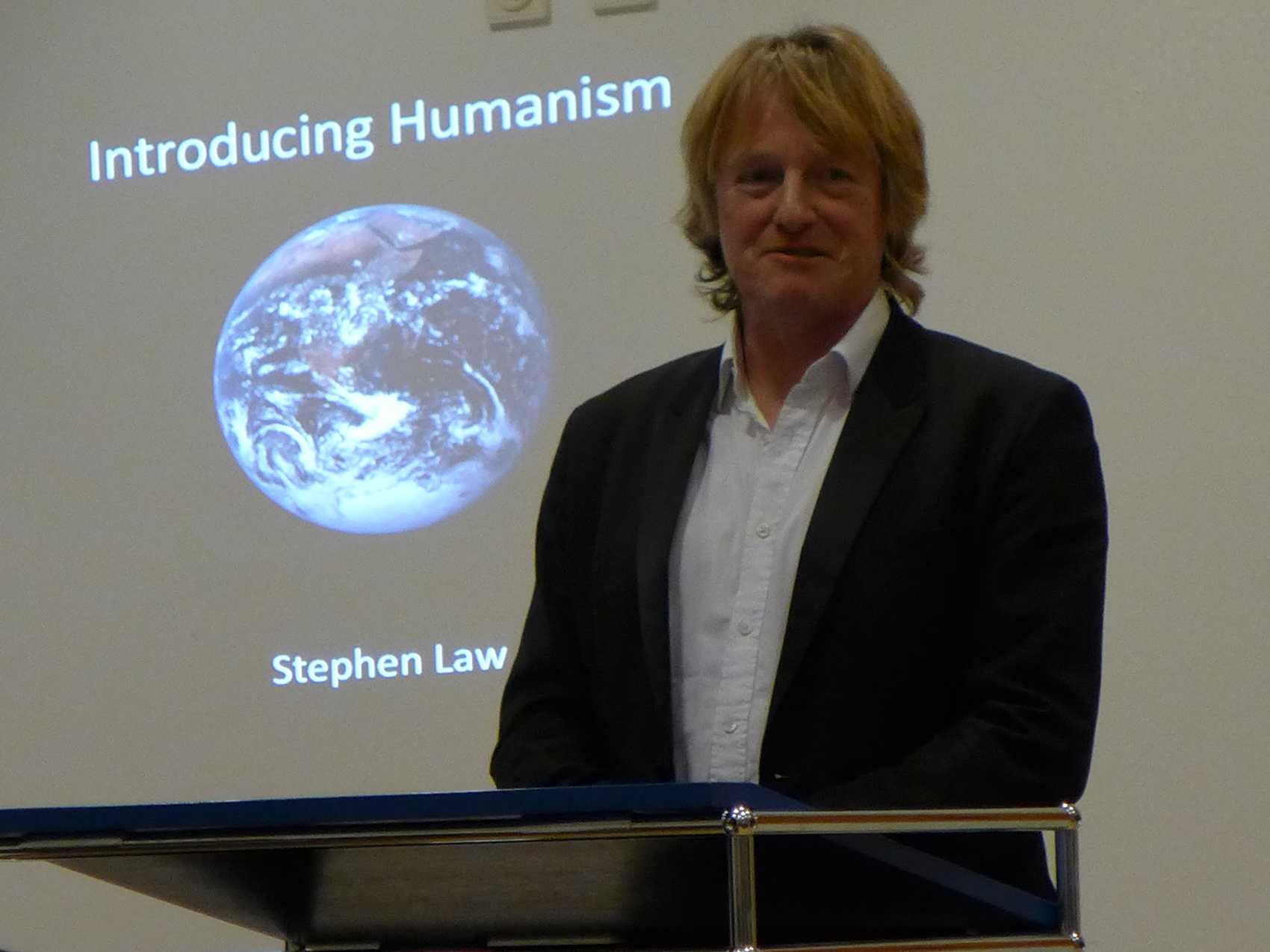
- Law in 2014 at the Forschungsinstitut für Philosophie Hannover
- Born: 12 December 1960 (age 65); Cambridge, England

Education
- Education: City University London; Trinity College, Oxford; The Queen's College, Oxford
- Thesis: Reference, essence and natural kinds (1995)

Philosophical work
- Era: Contemporary philosophy
- Region: Western philosophy
- School: Analytic philosophy

Stephen Law FRSA (born 1960) is an English philosopher. He is currently Director of the Certificate of Higher Education and Director of Philosophy at The Department for Continuing Education, University of Oxford. Law was previously Reader in Philosophy and Head of Department of Philosophy at Heythrop College, University of London, until its closure in 2018.

Law has served as editor of the philosophical journal Think since 2002, a publication sponsored by the Royal Institute of Philosophy and published by Cambridge University Press. He is a Fellow of The Royal Society of Arts and Commerce, became the provost of the Centre for Inquiry UK in 2008, and in 2023 was elected a fellow of the Committee for Skeptical Inquiry.

== Life ==
Law was born December 12, 1960 in Cambridge, England, and attended Long Road Sixth Form College. After being "asked to leave", he began his working life as a postman. During the four years he worked as a postman, Law spent much of his time reading, thinking, and writing, during which he developed an interest in philosophy. At the age of 23, Law qualified as a mature student, and he successfully managed to persuade City University in London to accept him for the BSc in Philosophy, despite his lack of A levels. He was accepted (and taken seriously), in part, due to the papers he had written during his time as a postman. There he managed to achieve a first-class honours, allowing him to move on to Trinity College, Oxford, to read for a BPhil in philosophy. He was also for three years a junior research fellow at The Queen's College, Oxford, where he obtained a doctorate in philosophy. Law lives in Oxford, England, with his wife and two daughters. His interests include drumming and mountaineering.

== Philosophy ==
Law has published both a variety of academic papers and popular, introductory books. He conducts research in the philosophy of mind, philosophy of language, metaphysics, and religion. Law has debated theists, including various Christian apologists. He developed the Evil God challenge, which he has employed in debates, as he did in his debate against William Lane Craig, and he's a critic of Young Earth creationism.

== Works ==
- The Philosophy Files 1 (2000) ISBN 1-84255-053-5
- The Philosophy Files 2 (2006) (formerly called The Outer Limits) ISBN 1-84255-525-1
- The Outer Limits: More Mysteries from the Philosophy Files (2003) ISBN 1-84255-062-4
- The Philosophy Gym (2003) ISBN 0-7472-3271-7
- The Xmas Files (2003) ISBN 0-297-84722-8
- The War For Children's Minds (2006) ISBN 0-415-37855-9
- Philosophy (Eyewitness Companion Guides) (2007) ISBN 1-4053-1763-9 translated also into Hungarian (Filozófia, 2008)
- The Great Philosophers (2008) ISBN 1-84724-398-3
- Israel, Palestine and Terror (2008) ISBN 0-82649-793-4
- Really, Really Big Questions (2009) ISBN 0-75341-781-2
- A Very Short Introduction to Humanism (2011) ISBN 0-19-955364-5
- Believing Bullshit: How Not to Get Sucked into an Intellectual Black Hole (2011) Prometheus Books: New York. ISBN 1-61614-411-4
