= Rick Lewis (journalist) =

Rick Lewis is the founder and editor of Philosophy Now and thereby one of the main initiators of the popular philosophy movement in the English-speaking world.

== Work ==
Lewis launched Philosophy Now in 1991, the first ever philosophy magazine worldwide. This new initiative facilitated a wave of popular philosophy activities in Great Britain, the United States, and elsewhere, which has since strengthened, and to the present owes much of its impetus to Lewis' work.

A few years after launching the magazine, Lewis succeeded in having it accepted by the UK news trade, making it the first philosophy title to appear on ordinary news stands.

In the mid-1990s, France and other countries saw a wave of philosophy cafés, informal philosophy meetings held in cafes. The first of these were created by Marc Sautet in Paris, and by the late 1990s they numbered in the hundreds. In 1998 Lewis and his Philosophy Now colleague Bryn R. Williams were among the first to import this innovation into Britain, adapting it to the local culture by holding philosophy meetings in pubs rather than cafés. Their first Pub Philosophy meeting was held at The Glassblower in Piccadilly Circus, and was reported on by Radio London; later meetings took place in another West End pub, The Clachan.

Lewis lives in South London, and has been a guest on philosophy-related programmes on BBC Radio 4 and elsewhere.

He also translated and published the Philosophy Now in Persian for the first time with AmirAli Maleki, the founder and editor of Praxis Publication.
