= Ibargüen =

Ibargüen is the name of:

- Alberto Ibargüen (born 1944), American newspaper publisher and nonprofit leader
- Andrés Ibargüen (born 1992), Colombian footballer
- Arley Ibargüen (born 1982), Colombian javelin thrower
- Carlos Ibargüen (born 1995), Colombian footballer
- Caterine Ibargüen (born 1984), Colombian long and triple jumper
- Giancarlo Ibárgüen (1963–2016), Guatemalan businessman and academic
