= Jill Nicholls =

British documentary filmmaker

- Education: Hemel Hempstead Grammar School; Newnham College, Cambridge (BA)
- Occupations: Filmmaker and journalist
- Awards: New Orleans Film Festival; Grierson Award; Royal Television Society Programme Awards
- Website: jillnicholls.net

Jill Nicholls is a British filmmaker, best known for her art documentaries on television. Her films over the decades have frequently featured the lives of high-profile figures, including Doris Lessing, Toni Morrison, Diana Athill, Judith Kerr, Salman Rushdie, Vivian Maier, Louise Bourgeois and Tom Stoppard. Nicholls has won several awards for her films, including from the Royal Television Society, the Grierson Trust and the New Orleans Film Festival. Also a journalist, she worked in the 1970s for women's liberation magazine Spare Rib, as well writing for other publications.

== Background ==
Jill Nicholls attended Hemel Hempstead Grammar School and read English at Newnham College, Cambridge (1971–74), gaining a first-class BA degree. She became involved in the Women's Liberation Movement while at university and helped to found a newsletter called Redstockings.

After graduating, she drove a delivery van for some months, in the course of which she achieved equal pay for women drivers. She subsequently joined the collective of feminist magazine Spare Rib, working there as a journalist (editing the news pages) between 1974 and 1980. During this time, Nicholls also taught at a further education college, as well as contributing to more mainstream publications such as New Society, Time Out, The Sunday Times and The Guardian.

Beginning in 1979, she and Angela Phillips wrote a column called "Omen" for The Guardian, giving news from a feminist point of view. Nicholls was also "agony aunt" ("Ask Jill") on such magazines as Loving, Woman’s World and Honey. After she left Spare Rib, in 1980 Nicholls helped to set up Sheba Feminist Publishers. Since 1983, she has worked in television, making documentaries.

Her first job in television was with ITV, working as a producer on the documentary series First Tuesday for Yorkshire Television, after which she went on to produce and direct films for Channel 4, BBC Two and BBC Four. She has since made many feature-length documentaries on arts and culture, mainly for BBC Music and the BBC One arts series Imagine hosted by Alan Yentob. The subjects of some of her award-winning films in the series include Allen Toussaint, Salman Rushdie, and Vivian Maier.

== Selected filmography ==
- 1989: Sister Martin's Profession (Producer)
- 2005: Tammy Wynette: 'Til I Can Make It on My Own (Director)
- 2006: Sweet Home New Orleans (Director)
- 2006: The Allen Toussaint Touch (Producer + Director)
- 2006: Following Peter Pan (Director)
- 2007: Louise Bourgeois: Spiderwoman (Director)
- 2008: Doris Lessing: The Hostess and the Alien (Director)
- 2010: The Weird World of Eadweard Muybridge (Director)
- 2010: A Kick in the Head: The Lure of Las Vegas (Director)
- 2010: Diana Athill: Growing Old Disgracefully (Director)
- 2011: The Lost Museum on Liberation Square (Director)
- 2011: Iraq In Venice (Director)
- 2011: The Lost Music of Rajasthan (Director)
- 2012: Fatwa: Salman's Story (Director)
- 2012: How Music Makes us Feel (Director)
- 2013: The Vivian Maier Mystery (Director)
- 2013: Vivian Maier: Who Took Nanny's Pictures? (Director)
- 2013: Hitler, the Tiger and Me (Director)
- 2015: Jeff Koons: Diary of a Seducer (Director)
- 2015: Toni Morrison Remembers (Director)
- 2016: Georgia O'Keeffe: By Myself (Director)
- 2017: She Spoke the Unspeakable – on Nawal El Saadawi (Director)
- 2018: Orhan Pamuk: A Strange Mind (Director)
- 2018: George Benjamin: What Do You Want to Do When You Grow Up? (Director)
- 2019: The Man Who Saw Too Much (Director)
- 2021: Tom Stoppard: A Charmed Life (Director)

== Awards and recognition ==
- 1996: Harold Wincott Award, Best Business Broadcast of the Year – When Rover Met BMW
- 2003: Royal Television Society Awards North, Nominee – Betrayed!
- 2005: Broadcast Awards, Nominee: Best Children's Documentary – Rooted
- 2006: BAFTA, Nominee: Children's Factual – Rooted
- 2006: Royal Television Society Awards, Nominee: Children's Factual – Rooted
- 2007: Rose d'Or, Nominee: Best Arts Film – Sweet Home New Orleans
- 2008: New Orleans Film Festival, Winner: Best Documentary – The Allen Toussaint Touch
- 2008: New Orleans Film Festival, Winner: Grand Prize – The Allen Toussaint Touch
- 2010: Focal Award, Nominee: Best Archive Film – Folk America
- 2011: International Festival Of Films On Art, Montreal, Official Selection – Diana Athill – Growing Old Disgracefully
- 2012: Artecinema Festival, Official Selection – Iraq in Venice
- 2012: International Festival Of Films On Art, Montreal, Official Selection – The Weird World of Eadweard Muybridge
- 2013: Grierson Award, Winner: Best Arts Film – Fatwa – Salman's Story
- 2013: International Festival Of Films On Art, Opening Gala – Fatwa – Salman's Story
- 2013: Vermont International Film Festival – Fatwa – Salman's Story
- 2013: Royal Television Society, Winner: Best Arts Film – Vivian Maier – Who Took Nanny's Pictures?
- 2014: International Festival Of Films On Art, Grand Prize – Vivian Maier – Who Took Nanny's Pictures?
- 2014: Grierson Award, Nominee: Best Arts Film – Vivian Maier – Who Took Nanny's Pictures?
- 2014: International Art Film Festival Tel Aviv, Official Selection – Vivian Maier – Who Took Nanny's Pictures?
- 2015: Artecinema, Naples, Official Selection – The Art That Hitler Hated
- 2015: Artecinema, Naples, Opening Gala – Jeff Koons – Diary of a Seducer
