= Lincoln Philosophy Café =

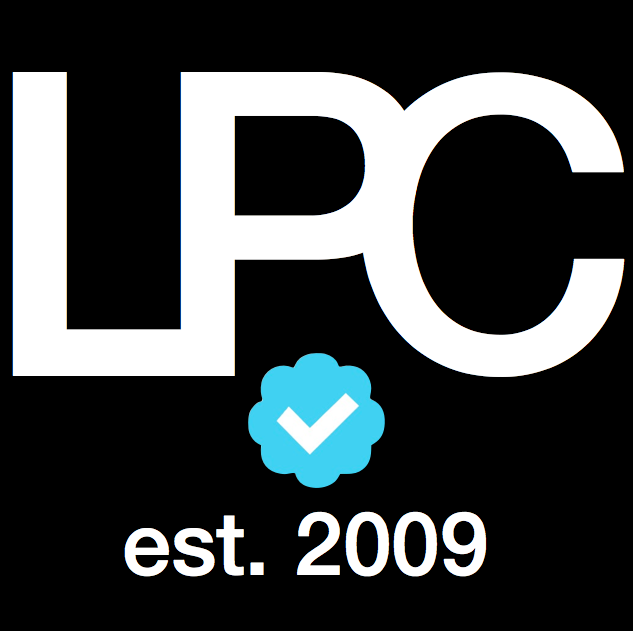
- 2011 logo
- Formation: 29 June 2009
- Founder: James Taylor-Foster
- Type: Café Philosophique
- Location: The Angel Coffee House, Lincoln, England
- Website: www.philosophycafe.co.uk

Lincoln Philosophy Café (LPC) is an open society for philosophical and topical discussion based in Lincoln (United Kingdom). It was founded on 29 June 2009 by James Taylor-Foster and has run continuously at the Angel Coffee House in central Lincoln since. According to the website, it is "a forum for listening, exchanging ideas and forming new opinions", as well as being "Lincoln’s only well established, free of charge, open topical & philosophical discussion group". In September 2011, Joseph Bell started facilitating Lincoln Philosophy Café meetings before Matthew Misiak began facilitating in September 2012. The 3rd anniversary of the Lincoln Philosophy Café at the Angel Coffee House was held on Monday 4 June 2012.

== Organisation ==
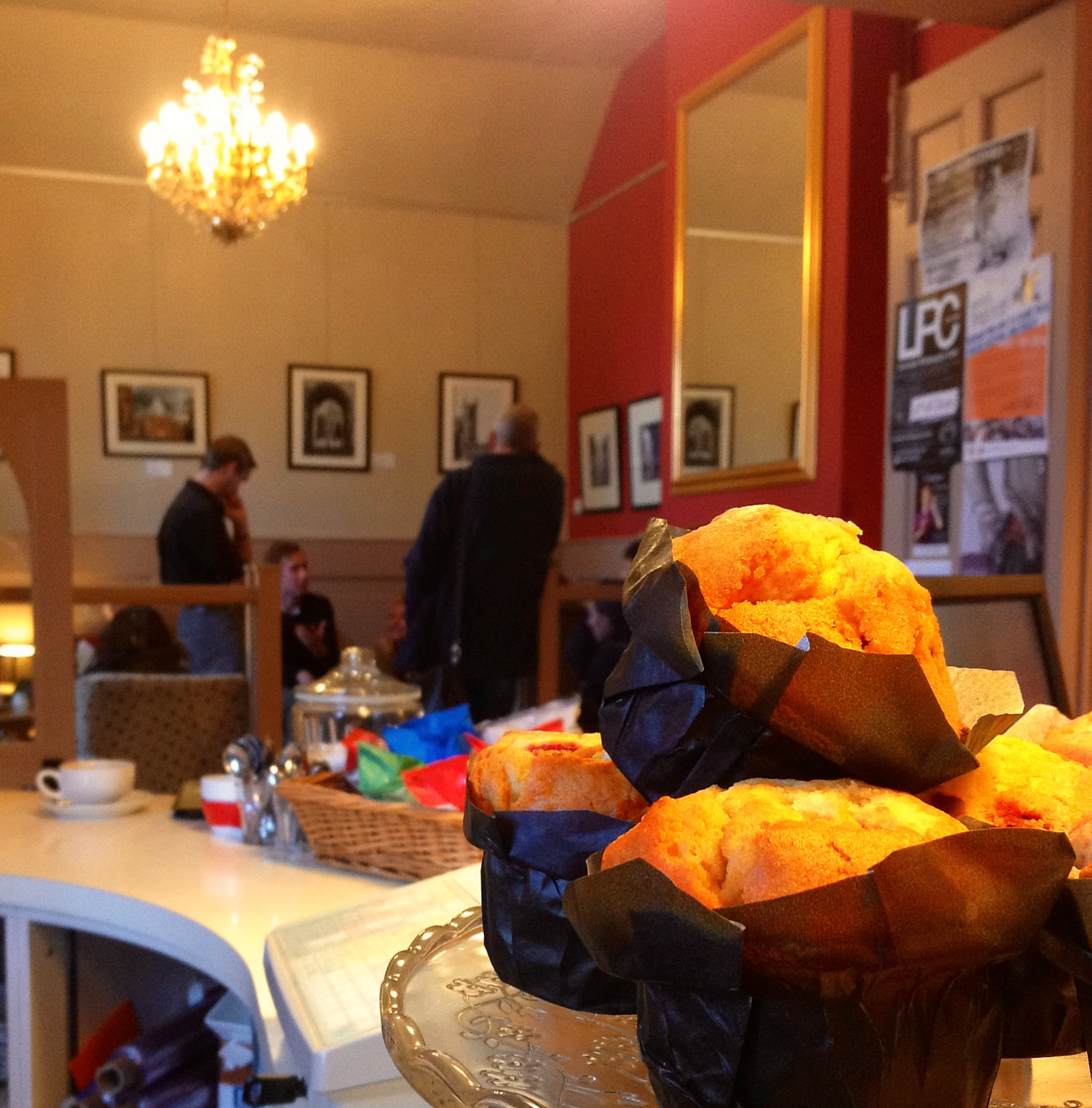
LPC’s 3rd Anniversary Meeting

The Lincoln Philosophy Café is a not-for-profit organisation and membership is completely free of charge to ensure that it is accessible to all. Registered with the Society for Philosophical Inquiry, the Lincoln Philosophy Café bases its core ideal around the concept of informal discussion in a relaxed environment. For example, members are encouraged to not argue with each other but rather to engage in debate of which there is no right nor wrong. The structure of each monthly or fortnightly meeting has been radically changed since its formation.

=== Local interest ===
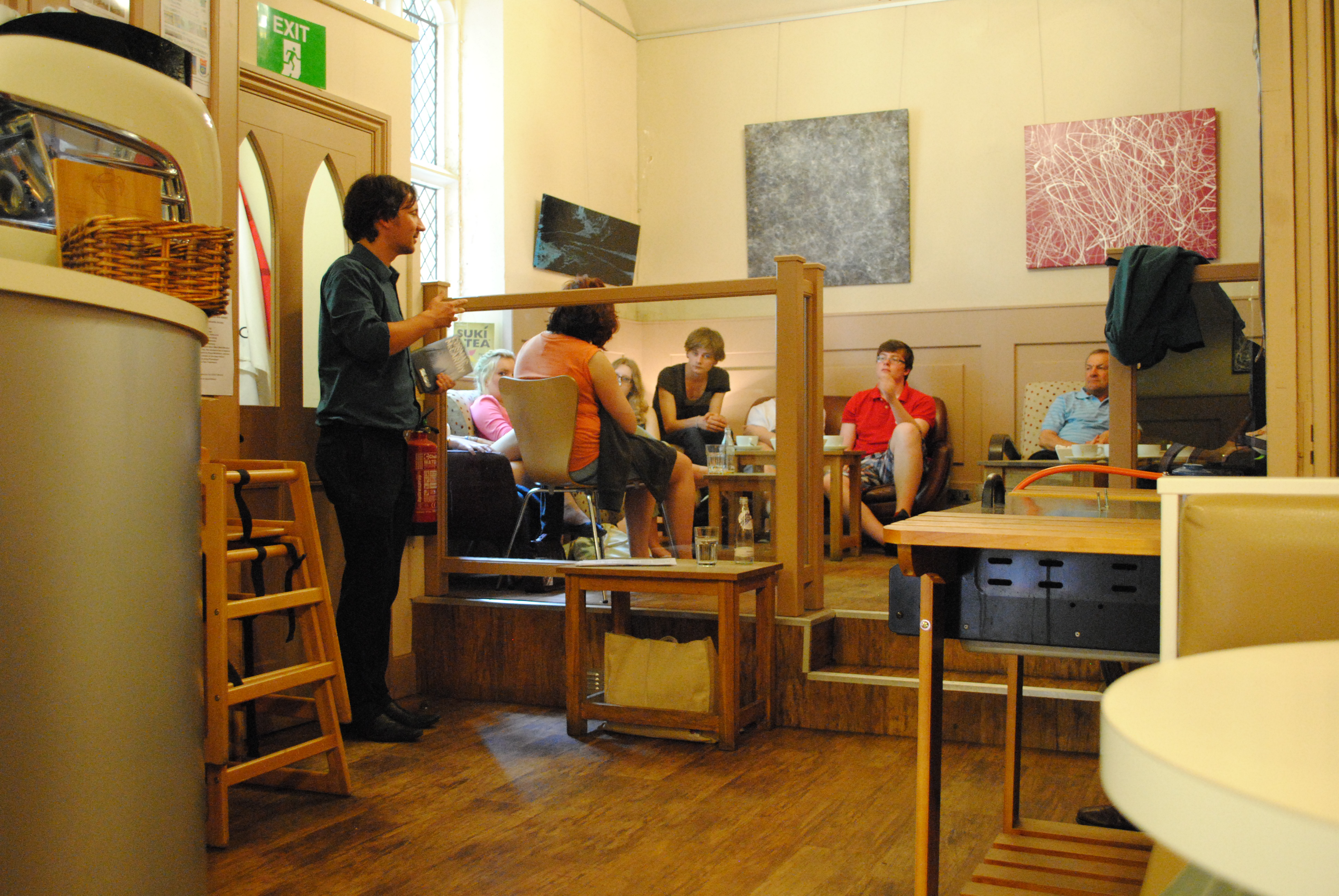
Guest Speaker at LPC in 2011

The Lincoln Philosophy Café has been given press attention, most recently in the Lincolnshire Echo, where it was described as being "a great social event that allows people of any age to share ideas". In the past, the Lincoln Philosophy Café has also had guest speakers, which was also documented in the Lincolnshire Echo, such as Dr. Euan Gallivan who spoke on Arthur Schopenhauer.

=== Facilitators ===
2009-2011 - James Taylor-Foster
2011-2012 - Joseph Bell
2012-2013 - Matthew Misiak
2013-2014 - Steve Marshall / Joseph Carson / Sophia Griffin-Yates

== Foundation ==
Its foundation was inspired by the work of Marc Sautet at the Parisian Café Philosophique (at the Café des Phares on Place de la Bastille). The idea of "a return to the basic principles of reasoning intended for the general public" is at the core of the structure of the Lincoln Philosophy Café, with anyone from anywhere welcomed. A diluted and uniquely evolved version of the Socratic Method is encouraged to stimulate people to challenge others opinions informally and politely without causing argument.

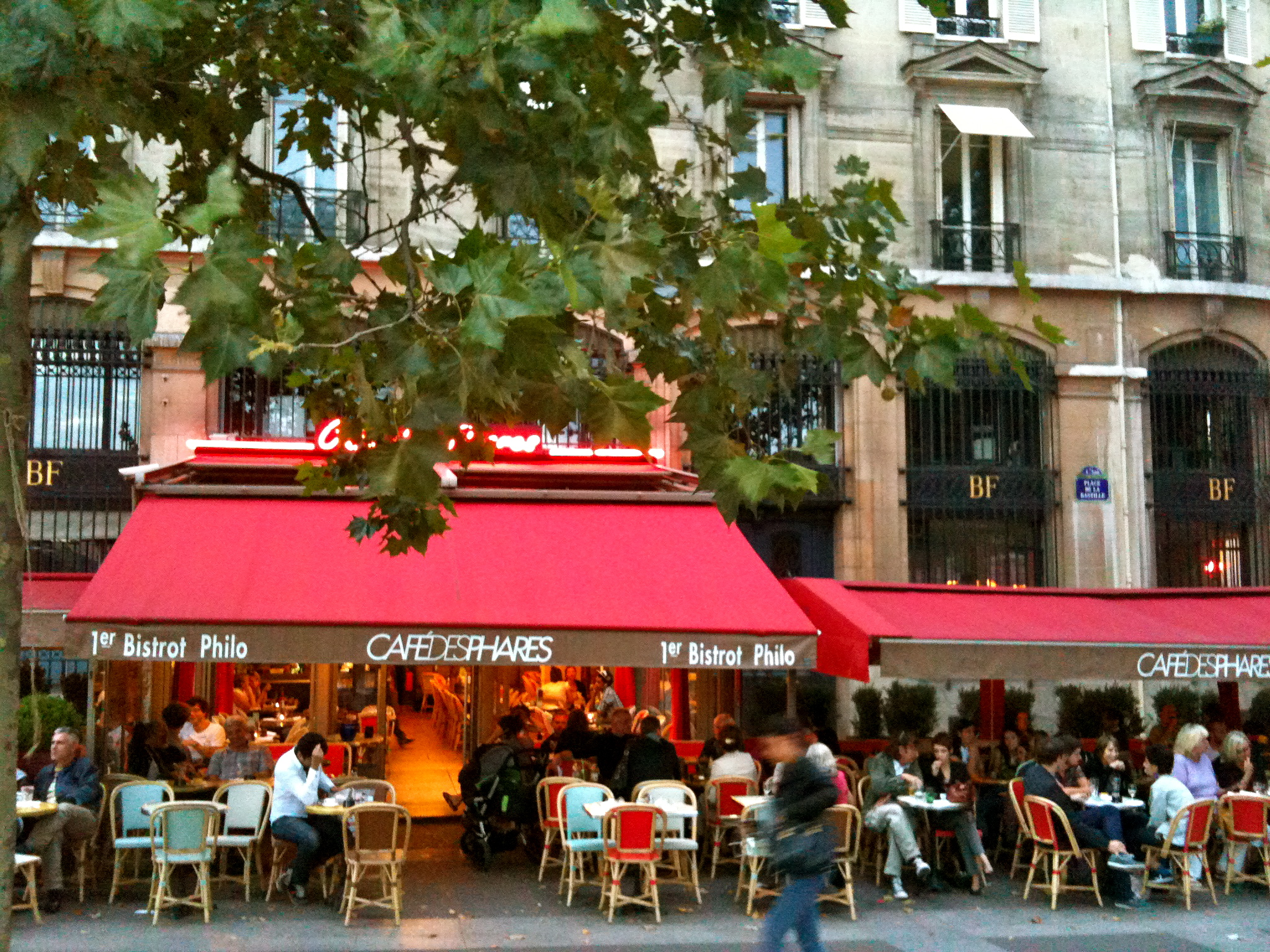
The Café des Phares, Paris, the first café philosophique in the world
