= Philosophy Now =

Bimonthly philosophy magazine

- Aug/Sept 2017 cover
- Editor: Rick Lewis, Grant Bartley
- Frequency: Bimonthly
- Founded: 1991; 35 years ago
- Company: Anja Publications
- Country: United Kingdom / United States
- Based in: London
- Website: philosophynow.org
- ISSN: 0961-5970
- OCLC: 743049565

Philosophy Now is a bimonthly philosophy magazine sold from news-stands and book stores in the United Kingdom, United States, Australia, and Canada; it is also available on digital devices, and online. It aims to appeal to the general educated public, as well as to students and philosophy teachers. It was established in 1991 and was the first general philosophy magazine.

== History ==
Philosophy Now was established in May 1991 as a quarterly magazine by Rick Lewis. The first issue included an article on free will by then atheist philosopher Antony Flew, who remained an occasional contributor for many years.

The magazine was initially published in Lewis' home town of Ipswich (England). Peter Rickman soon became one of the most regular contributors. In 1997, a group of American philosophers including Raymond Pfeiffer and Charles Echelbarger lobbied the American Philosophical Association to start a similar magazine in the United States. The APA executive director Eric Hoffman arranged a meeting in Philadelphia in 1997, to which Lewis was invited. At the meeting, it was decided that the American group should join forces with Lewis to further develop Philosophy Now. Since that time, the magazine has been produced jointly by two editorial boards, in the UK and US. The magazine is distributed in the US by the Philosophy Documentation Center.

In 2000, Philosophy Now increased its frequency to appear bimonthly; Lewis is now the editor in chief, while Grant Bartley is editor of the print edition and Bora Dogan edits the digital editions.

Philosophy Now won the Bertrand Russell Society Award for 2016. Rick Lewis also translated and publish the Philosophy Now in Persian for the first time with AmirAli Maleki, the founder and editor of Praxis Publication.

== Contents ==
The magazine contains articles on most areas of philosophy. Most are written by academics, though some are by postgraduate students or independent writers. Although it aims at a non-specialist audience, Philosophy Now has frequently attracted articles by well-known thinkers.

Philosophy Now also regularly features book reviews, interviews, fiction, a film column, cartoons, and readers' letters. Its regular columnists include Raymond Tallis (Tallis in Wonderland) and Peter Adamson (Philosophy Then). For some years there was a philosophical agony-aunt column called Dear Socrates, supposedly written by a reincarnation of the Athenian sage. There is an online forum for discussion of the magazine's contents.

== Scoops and controversies ==
The philosophy professor Antony Flew, noted for his arguments in favour of atheism, published a letter in Philosophy Now's August/September 2004 issue in which he first indicated that his position regarding God's existence had changed. The news of Flew's change-of-mind was carried in many newspapers worldwide, most of them referencing Flew's Philosophy Now letter.

A Philosophy Now interview with the Canadian philosopher Charles Taylor in 2009 created controversy in Canadian newspapers because of Taylor's dismissive remarks about an atheist poster campaign on buses.

== Abstracting and indexing ==
The magazine is abstracted and indexed in:

- British Humanities Index
- International Bibliography of Periodical Literature (IBZ)

== Philosophy Now Festival ==
The magazine organised a philosophy festival for the general public every two years from 2011 to 2020. It was held at Conway Hall in Bloomsbury in central London. The first festival, in 2011, was held partly to mark the 20th anniversary of the magazine's launch. It became a regular biannual event, with festivals held in 2013, 2015, January 2018 and 2020. Each festival was a one-day event involving contributions from more than a dozen philosophy organisations including Philosophy For All and the Royal Institute of Philosophy.

== Against Stupidity Award ==
Also in 2011, the magazine launched an annual award, the Philosophy Now Award for Contributions in the Fight Against Stupidity. The first winner was the philosopher Mary Midgley. Each year since, there has been an award ceremony at Conway Hall, including an acceptance speech. In 2011, 2013, 2015 and 2018 this was part of the Philosophy Now Festival.

In October 2015 Philosophy Now announced that the 2015 Award would for the first time be given to a children's author, Cressida Cowell. The full list of winners is:

- 2011: Mary Midgley
- 2012: Ben Goldacre
- 2013: Raymond Tallis
- 2014: Noam Chomsky
- 2015: Cressida Cowell
- 2016: Peter Singer
- 2017: James Randi
- 2018: Robert Sapolsky
- 2019: Angela Phillips
- 2020: Jon Ronson

== See also ==
- Newton's flaming laser sword
- The Death of Postmodernism and Beyond
- Think
- Café Philosophique
