= Angela Phillips =

British journalist and professor

- Occupations: Journalist and academic
- Employer: Goldsmiths, University of London
- Awards: Contributions in the Fight Against Stupidity award

Angela Phillips is a British journalist and academic, who is an Emeritus Professor in the Department of Media, Communications and Cultural Studies at Goldsmiths, University of London. Her work in journalism spans more than four decades, initially as a photojournalist before moving into print, writing for feminist and alternative publications as well as the mainstream national press, notably for The Guardian, and featuring on television, radio and the Internet.

Since the 1990s, Phillips has taught journalism and journalism studies at Goldsmiths, University of London, and has been active in journalism research. At Goldsmiths, she established the MA Journalism, MA Digital Journalism and set up the joint honours BA Journalism in conjunction with the Department of Computing. She was a founding member of the Media Reform Coalition.

== Career ==
Having trained in photography, Phillips began her career as a photojournalist for the alternative press in the 1970s. She worked with the feminist magazine Spare Rib from before its 1972 launch, shooting the cover of the first issue as well as several later covers, and writing features and co-editing the news pages (with Jill Nicholls). Phillips subsequently became a regular contributor to other publications, as well as to radio and television.

Since 1994, she has taught at Goldsmiths, University of London, becoming a professor in 2016, and she established the MA Journalism and MA Digital Journalism courses and initiated the joint honours BA Journalism in conjunction with Goldsmith's Department of Computing. In 2009, she launched the multi-media, news website EastLondonLines, which is run by Goldsmiths journalism students and has a wide local readership. Her areas of research include democracy and journalism, ethics, working practices, and the changing audiences for news. She has worked with the Goldsmiths Leverhulme Media Research Centre and chaired the Ethics Committee of the Coordinating Committee for Media Reform, giving evidence to the Leveson enquiry into the press. She also gave evidence to the Cairncross review on the future of the British Press in 2018.

Phillips was the 2019 winner of the Contributions in the Fight Against Stupidity award, an annual award given by Philosophy Now to someone who has made "an outstanding recent contribution to promoting knowledge, reason or public debate about issues that matter".

A frequent participant in conferences and seminars internationally, Phillips has contributed papers and spoken on many panels, including:

- Speaker, Shanghai University conference on journalism training, Shanghai, December 2006;
- Ourselves and Our Others, ICA conference, San Francisco, May 2007;
- "Who speaks": panel speaker IAMCR, Paris, July 2007;
- Media Management and Transformation Centre (MMTC), Jönköping Business School, Sweden in April 2008;
- "New Media, Old News: Journalism and Democracy in a Digital Age Seminar", British Academy, 19 November 2008;
- "Old Sources: New Bottles": panel speaker, ECREA, Barcelona, 2008;
- Paper for "Trust, Truth, and Performance: Diverse Journalisms in the 21st Century", University of Groningen, December 2009;
- "Transparency and the new ethics of journalism", paper for Future of Journalism Conference, Cardiff, 2009;
- "Speed, Quality and Sociability: the changing practice of live news reporting", Future of Journalism Conference, Cardiff, 2011;
- "Changing Journalism/Reclaiming the News", Leverhulme conference, Senate House, London, 3 April 2012;
- "Deep and narrow or shallow and wide: a comparative study of how young people find news via social media". Future of Journalism Conference, Cardiff, 2015;
- "Beyond the platform: Young people's news engagement in a social networking society", 2015 IAMCR Conference Montreal, Canada;
- "Can trust in traditional news media explain differences in news exposure of young people online?" at the 2015 IAMCR Conference Montreal, Canada.
- "On bubbles and streams: news audiences in the era of social media". Inaugural Lecture, Goldsmiths, 25 October 2016.

Phillips has written or co-authored several books, including Changing Journalism (Routledge, 2011), Journalism in Context: Practice and Theory for the Digital Age (Routledge, 2014) and Misunderstanding News Audiences: Seven Myths of the Social Media Era (Routledge, 2018).

== Selected bibliography ==
- (With Jill Rakusen) Our Bodies Ourselves: A Health Book by and for Women, Penguin, 1978.
- Your Body, Your Baby, Your Life: Guide to Pregnancy and Childbirth, Pandora Press, 1983
- "Prince Charming? Haven't seen him for ages: Bullying single mothers will not wash. It is men who must acknowledge a world that has left fairy-tale marriages behind", The Independent, 8 July 1993.
- The Trouble With Boys, Basic Books, 1995.
- "Hugs and wails and Highly Involved Males...", The Guardian, 17 March 1999.
- "The pill, sex and women's liberation", The Guardian, 31 March 2006.
- "Is the male pill good for women?", The Guardian
- "Press and Publishing", in by Kate Coyer, Tony Dowmunt, Alan Fountain (eds), Alternative Media Handbook, Routledge, 2007.
- "Shelter in the storm", The Guardian, 19 February 2007.
- Good Writing for Journalists, Sage, 2007.
- "Muslims and the media", The Guardian, 15 November 2007
- (With Elisabeth Eide and Risto Kunelius) "Transnational Media Events: The Mohammed Cartoons and the Imagined Clash of Civilizations", Gothenburg: Nordicom, University of Gothenburg, 2008.
- "Hiding fear by talking tough", The Guardian, 12 December 2008.
- "Spare Rib Magazine", in John Downing (ed.), Social Movement Media Encyclopedia, Sage, 2010.
- "Why I like the subsidised neighbours", The Guardian, 1 November 2010.
- (With Peter Lee-Wright and Tamara Witschge) Changing Journalism, Routledge, 2011, ISBN 978-0415579544.
- "I haven't hit her for two years: Violent men were often damaged as children. How can they reform?", The Independent, 22 October 2011.
- (With James Curran and Des Freedman) "Rehabilitating Britain's news media", The Guardian, 16 November 2011.
- "The future of journalism", openDemocracy, 6 April 2012.
- "Lord Leveson understands that legal back-up could improve the quality of journalism in Britain", The Independent, 3 December 2012.
- Journalism in Context, Routledge, 2014, ISBN 9780415536288.
- "Getty Images' attempt to combat female stereotyping is noble but in vain", The Guardian, 11 February 2014.
- "What can and should the BBC do about local news?", openDemocracy, 13 October 2015.
- "Which source do students trust more? BBC News vs Facebook News Feed?", openDemocracy, 3 November 2015.
- "Will crowdfunding save journalism?", The Conversation, 23 February 2016.
- (With Elvestad Eiri and Mira Feuerstein) "Can Trust in Traditional News Media Explain Cross-National Differences in News Exposure of Young People Online?", Digital Journalism, 6(2), 2017
- (With Elvestad Eiri) Misunderstanding News Audiences: Seven Myths of the Social Media Era, Routledge, 2018, ISBN 978-1138215191.
- "Debunking The Myths Of The Social Media Era", HuffPost, 8 March 2018.
- "These are the most common myths about social media", World Economic Forum, 14 March 2018.
- "The Cairncross Review Is Right To Say Journalism Might Need Intervention To Be Saved", HuffPost, 12 February 2019.
