= Giancarlo Ibarguen =

Guetamalan businessman, academic (1963–2016)

Giancarlo Ibárgüen
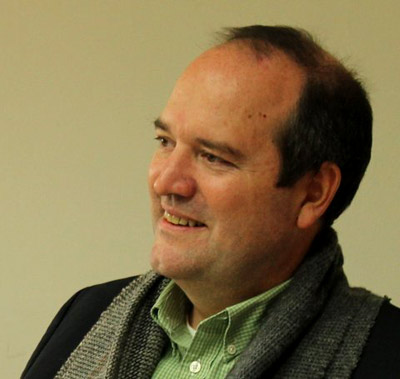
- Born: Giancarlo Ibárgüen Segovia; October 15, 1963; Guatemala City, Guatemala
- Died: March 9, 2016 (aged 53); Guatemala City, Guatemala
- Occupations: Academic, businessman
- Years active: 1988–2016
- Known for: President of Universidad Francisco Marroquín

Giancarlo Ibárgüen Segovia (October 15, 1963 – March 9, 2016) was a Guatemalan businessman and academic. He served as President of the Universidad Francisco Marroquín from 2003 to August 14, 2013.

== Early life ==
Giancarlo Ibarguen was born on October 15, 1963, in Guatemala City, Guatemala. His father was Roberto Andres Ibargüen and his mother Lillian Segovia de Ibargüen. He received a Bachelor of Science in electrical engineering with honors from Texas A&M University in 1985.

== Career ==
=== Academia ===
Ibarguen started his career at the Universidad Francisco Marroquín as a professor of economics. He was a member of the board of directors of UFM from 1992 till his death. From 1995 to 2003, he served as its secretary general. Starting in 2003, he was its president. Starting in 2005, he was the Director of the Centro Henry Hazlitt (a research center in honor of Henry Hazlitt) at UFM.

Ibarguen was a founding editor of the magazine Intuición and sat on the editorial board of Gerencia magazine from 1992 to 1994. He sat on the advisory board of the Society for Philosophical Inquiry. He was also a board member of the Asociación de Gerentes de Guatemala and the Society for Philosophical Inquiry. His work has been published in Telecommunications Policy, Siglo Veintiuno, The Wall Street Journal, etc.

=== Think tanks ===
Ibarguen was a member of the board of directors of the Centro de Estudios Económicos Sociales since 1990. In 1991, he was a founding member of the Asociación por el Poder Local (APOLO). From 2005 to 2006, he served as vice president of the Association of Private Enterprise Education, and as its president from 2006 to 2007. Starting in 2007, he was a board member of the Liberty Fund in Indianapolis, Indiana. In 2008, he joined the board of trustees of the Philadelphia Society. Since 2005, he sat on the Board of Advisors of AIESEC. He served as secretary on the board of directors of the Mont Pelerin Society. In 2009, he received the Guardian of Freedom award from the Acton Institute. A libertarian, he argued that the United States government should end its war on drugs to put an end to violence in Guatemala.

=== Business ===
From 2006 to 2008, Ibarguen served as an Advisor to the Partners in Learning program of the Microsoft Corporation. He served on the Boards of Directors of Samboro, Glifos, Belluno, and Algodón Superior.

== Personal life ==
Ibarguen was married to Isabel Dougherty de Ibárgüen for 32 years. They have three children; Cristobal, Sebastian (married to Carolina Escobar) and Sofia, with one grandchild; Tiago

Ibarguen's best friends were Rafael and Chiqui Borjes. They have three children; his favorite nephew and nieces, Rafa, Anna Carlota and Andrea.

== Death ==
In 2009, Ibarguen was diagnosed with ALS, which led to his death on March 9, 2016, in Guatemala City, Guatemala.

== Bibliography ==
- Constitucion, Socialismo y Mercantilismo en America Latina (co-written with Manuel Ayau, Nicomedes Zuloaga, Leonor Filardo, Hugo Faria, Enrique Ghersi, Marcelo Loprete, 2008)
- Facetas liberales. Ensayos en honor de Manuel F. Ayau (co-edited with Alberto Benegas Lynch, 2011)
