= The Philosophy Gym =

The Philosophy Gym: 25 Short Adventures in Thinking
- Author: Stephen Law
- Subject: Public philosophy
- Published: 2003
- Publisher: Thomas Dunne Books
- Pages: 224 pp.
- ISBN: 9780312314521

The Philosophy Gym: 25 Short Adventures in Thinking is a book by Stephen Law. It is an introduction to philosophical thinking aimed at adults. It covers twenty-five philosophical questions, chosen for their relevance to today's society. The book aims for accessibility. This is often done, as in "What's wrong with gay sex?", by putting the question into a theatrical script.

The German version of The Philosophy Gym won the first Mindelheim Philosophy Prize in 2009.

== Chapter list ==
1. Where did the universe come from?
2. What is wrong with gay sex?
3. Brain – snatched (discussion of metaphysical issues of knowledge of the external world, and Déscartes' 'Cogito Ergo Sum' (I think therefore I am))
4. Is time travel possible?
5. Into the lair of the relativist (a look at and analysis of relativist claims, mainly ethical relativity)
6. Could a machine think?
7. Does God exist?
8. The strange case of the rational dentist (a look at specific knowledge of other minds and the extent to which we may have knowledge of them)
9. But is it art?
10. Can we have morality without God and religion?
11. Is creationism scientific?
12. Designer babies... (a look at the case for designer babies)
13. The consciousness conundrum (a look at the debated nature of consciousness)
14. Why expect the sun to rise tomorrow? (an examination of Hume's problem of induction)
15. Do we ever deserve to be punished?
16. The meaning mystery (an examination of linguistics and the ways in which language may have meaning)
17. Killing Mary to save Jodie (a discussion of utilitarianism and the nature of ethics)
18. The strange realm of numbers (discussion of the nature of mathematics)
19. What is knowledge?
20. Is morality like a pair of spectacles (a look at subjectivism amongst other things)
21. Should you be eating that (a look at the case for vegetarianism)
22. Brain transplants, teleportation and the puzzle of personal identity
23. Miracles and the supernatural
24. How to spot eight everyday reasoning errors
25. Seven paradoxes
