= Green Drinks =

Green Drinks is an informal networking event where environmentally minded people meet over drinks. Started in London in 1989, by Edwin Datschefski, Paul Scott, Ian Grant and Yorick Benjamin, it has spread to 51 cities in the United Kingdom, 400 in the U.S. and many more in Canada, Germany, Poland, Sweden, the Netherlands, Japan, Singapore, Kuala Lumpur, Hong Kong, Manila, New Zealand, Australia, Argentina, Chile, Puerto Rico and Lebanon. As of March 2011, 770 Green Drink Chapters have been established worldwide.

The New York City Chapter was founded by Margaret Lydecker in July 2002 and is the largest global chapter with 14,000+ members. The December 2007 Holiday Party, marked the largest Green Drinks event in New York City to date with a 1000+ person record attendance, which was covered by CNN. Green Drinks NYC has an average attendance of 400 people held at different venues around Manhattan and has been a driver for connectivity, community, collaboration and change within the environmental sector in New York City and beyond. The 2009 Green Drinks Holiday Event, featured Dr. Sylvia Earle, world-renowned oceanographer, scientist and TED prize winner.

Lydecker has made significant contributions to the growth and expansion of Green Drinks chapters around the world personally helping to start or influence 200+ chapters including a chapter in Kabul, Afghanistan and is the USA point person for Green Drinks.

As of 15 February 2008, Melbourne, Australia holds the record for the world's biggest Green Drinks. Over 1700 people attended an event held on the first evening of the city's 2008 Sustainable Living Festival.

In December 2008, the Organizer for the Green Drinks Hawaii events added a social networking site for all the Green Drinks attendees worldwide.

== See also ==
- Café Scientifique
- Conservation movement
- Environmentalism
- Environmental protection
