= Christopher Phillips =

American philosopher (born 1959)

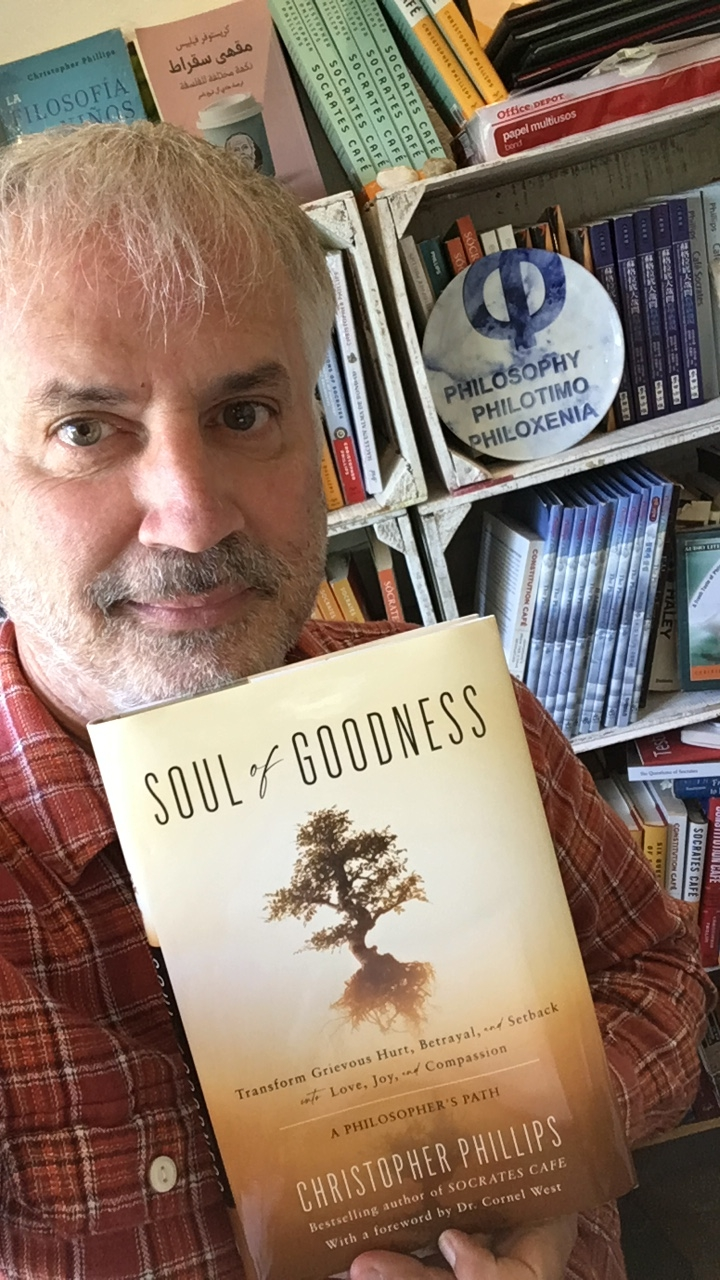
- Phillips in 2024
- Born: July 15, 1959 (age 67); Newport News, Virginia, U.S.
- Education: College of William & Mary (BA); Montclair State University (MAT); California State University, Dominguez Hills (MA); Delta State University (MS); Edith Cowan University (PhD)
- Occupations: Author; educator; consultant; lecturer; practitioner; scholar
- Writing career
- Period: 1996–present
- Subjects: Socratic dialogue, philosophy, democracy, constitution
- Notable works: Socrates Cafe: A Fresh Taste of Philosophy, Soul of Goodness (with a foreword by Dr. Cornel West), Six Questions of Socrates, Constitution Cafe: Jefferson's Brew for a True Revolution
- Notable awards: Distinguished American Leadership Award
- Website: www.christopherphillips.com

Christopher Phillips (born July 15, 1959) is a Greek-American author, educator, consultant, lecturer, practitioner and scholar of the Socratic method. He founded the global grassroots Socrates Cafe initiative and co-founded the nonprofit Democracy Cafe.

== Early life and education ==
At age 12, Phillips began immersing himself in Plato's dialogues featuring the Athenian philosopher Socrates, and the historian Xenophon's Socratic dialogues. This inspired him, mentioned in his book Soul of Goodness, to hold his first dialogues a la Socrates during lunch time at Carver Intermediate School in Newport News, Virginia, during the height of the desegregation era. After graduating from Menchville High School, he obtained a BA in government from the College of William & Mary. In 1997, he earned an Master of Arts in Teaching from Montclair State University, studying under the Institute for the Advancement of Philosophy for Children. In 2000, he earned an M.A. in humanities, with an emphasis in philosophy, at California State University, Dominguez Hills; He has a Master of Science in Natural Sciences degree from Delta State University, the first of his master's degrees. With both a scholarship and a teaching fellowship, at the age of 50, Phillips received a PhD in communications from Edith Cowan University in Australia - the subject of his doctoral dissertation (Or thesis as it is known in Australia) is "Socrates café: an effective mechanism for realising a more participatory democracy". He later received a three-semester appointment as senior writing and research fellow at the University of Pennsylvania.

== Phillips's Café Initiatives ==
Phillips began his professional life in 1981 as a middle school literature teacher in a six-room schoolhouse in Casco, Maine. He held Socratic circle dialogues with his students. He was also a feature and hard-news and feature newspaper reporter in Bridgton, Maine and Abingdon, Virginia, before he became a freelance writer for national magazines.

Besides the Socrates Cafe, Phillips has launched related initiatives, including Democracy Cafe, Constitution Cafe, Spirit of '76 Cafe (Part of his Declaration Project), and most recently, Deep Space Cafe, and Shakespeare Cafe. This latter project springs originally from the "tragically unexpected death" of his father.

Public intellectual and civic activist Cornel West refers to Phillips as "the greatest living embodiment of the Socratic spirit in our catastrophic times. His global grassroots movement of Socrates Cafés and Democracy Cafés have transformed the lives of millions of people in every continent on the Earth. His brilliant and wise books have touched the minds and souls of so many of us".

== Academic and Independent Scholar Career, other endeavors ==
Phillips was a 2012 recipient of the Distinguished American Leadership Award, alongside Adam Braun, the founder of Pencils of Promise. Phillips has taught in the graduate program Media, Culture and Communication at New York University, and the University of Pennsylvania as a Senior Writing and Research Fellow. He has been Senior Education Fellow at the National Constitution Center and 2014–15 Network Fellow at the Edmond J. Safra Center for Ethics at Harvard University. In 2024, he was titled Philosopher-In-Residence for Humanity in Deep Space. Phillips is also a registered Investment Advisor Representative, with specialties in ESG (Environmental, Societal, Governance) Investment and SRI (Socially Responsible Impact) Investing.

== Published works ==
=== Books ===
The books published by Phillips are (the ISBNs refer to paperback editions, where available):

- Constitution Cafe: Jefferson's Brew for a True Revolution (ISBN 978-0-393-06480-3) (W.W. Norton, 2011)
- Socrates in Love: Philosophy for a Die-Hard Romantic (ISBN 978-0393330670) (W.W. Norton, 2007) [Published in numerous other languages]
- Six Questions of Socrates: A Modern-Day Journey of Discovery through World Philosophy (ISBN 978-0393326796) (W.W. Norton, 2004) [Published as well in many other languages]
- Socrates Café: A Fresh Taste of Philosophy (ISBN 978-0393322989) (W.W. Norton, 2001) [Widely published also in other languages]
- A Child at Heart: Unlocking Your Creativity, Curiosity and Reason at Every Age and Stage of Life (Skyhorse, 2018), ISBN 1510729631 [Published in other languages as well]
- Ceci Ann's Day of Why (ISBN 978-1582461717) (Penguin Random House, 2006) [this is now independently published as 'Day of Why,' part of Phillip's 'Days of Wonder' series; it is published in other languages, including Mayan languages as well as Spanish, Korean, Greek, Japanese]
- The Philosophers' Club (ISBN 978-1582460390) (Penguin Random House, 2004) [This is now independently published, and is part of a Philosophers' Club series of books that includes 'Worlds of Difference'
- Soul of Goodness: Transform Grievous Hurt, Betrayal, and Setback into Love, Joy, and Compassion, with a foreword by Dr. Cornel West ISBN 978-1633887886

=== Papers ===
Phillips wrote the following papers:

- "Coalition" M/C Journal, Vol. 13, No. 6 (2010)
- "The Austrian Philosopher Who Showed that Words Can Spark Humanism – Or Barbarism"," Zocalo Public Square, January 31, 2018
- "Philosophical Counseling: An Ancient Practice Is Being Rejuvenated," Thinking: The Journal of Philosophy for Children, Vol. 14, Issue 1, 1998, pp. 48–49
- "Daring to Revise America's Sacred Text", San Francisco Chronicle, Opinion Page, July 3, 2017
- "Socratic Inquiry for All Ages", Vol. 8, No. 15, 2012, Childhood & Philosophy
- "Why aren't kids part of 'All men are created equal'?", Huffington Post, December 9, 2014
- "Live Like Picasso: Nurturing Fluid Intelligence and an 'Artistic Dimension", Huffington Post, December 19, 2014
- "The Efficacy of the Lipmanian Approach to Teaching Philosophy for Children", Childhood & Philosophy, Vol. 7, No. 13, 2011

== See also ==
- Socrates Café
- Socratic dialogue
- Walter Kaufmann
- Matthew Lipman
- Justus Buchler
