= Dagobert D. Runes =

American philosopher

Dagobert David Runes
- Born: January 6, 1902; Zastavna, Bukovina, Austro-Hungary (now Ukraine)
- Died: September 24, 1982 (aged 80); New York City, New York, U.S.
- Education: University of Vienna (PhD)
- Known for: Founder of the Philosophical Library

Dagobert David Runes (January 6, 1902 – September 24, 1982) was an immigrant publisher in the US, a philosopher and author.

== Biography ==
Runes was born in Zastavna, Bukovina, Austro-Hungary (now in Ukraine). He received a doctorate in philosophy from the University of Vienna in 1924, under the direction of Moritz Schlick, one of the founders of the Vienna Circle of positivist philosophers.

Inspired by youthful vigor and free-thinking ideas, Runes's first book entitled The True Jesus or the Fifth Gospel (1927), published in a Viennese publishing house with the financial support of the Social Democratic Party of Austria, created such a stir, says Professor of German literature Ulrich E. Bach, that its publisher, Rudolf Cerny, was sentenced to sixty days in prison. Thus Runes - fearing a charge of blasphemy - was forced to emigrate to New York as early as 1928.

In the U.S. he became editor of The Modern Thinker (Founded as The Thinker in 1929, acquired and renamed by Runes in 1932, closed in 1936.), The Modern Psychologist (1932–1938), and Current Digest (1933–1940). From 1931 to 1934 he was Director of the Institute for Advanced Education in New York City. One of its earliest creations as a publisher was the scholarly Journal of Aesthetics and Art Criticism, which is still being published. In 1941 he founded the Philosophical Library, a spiritual organization and publishing house. He wrote and edited numerous books on the subjects of philosophy, politics, education, Judaism and his own poetry. His poem “Gottes Wiederkehr” was adapted for a four-part mixed choir as Op. 50a “Dreimal tausend Jahre” (“Three times a thousand Years”) by Arnold Schoenberg. In New York, Runes socialized with many public figures and especially those driven into exile by Hitler. Alfred Adler, Albert Einstein and Emil Ludwig were among his illustrious acquaintances.

== Selected works ==
- Der wahre Jesus oder das fünfte Evangelium R. Cerny, 1927.
- Dictionary of Philosophy (editor), Philosophical Library, 1942.
- The Selected Writings of Benjamin Rush (editor) Philosophical Library, 1947.
- Jordan Lieder: Frühe Gedichte (in German) The Philosophical Library, 1948.
- Letters to My Son The Philosophical Library, 1949.
- The Hebrew Impact on Western Civilization The Philosophical Library, 1951.
- Spinoza Dictionary The Philosophical Library, 1951.
- Of God, the Devil and the Jews The Philosophical Library, 1952.
- The Soviet Impact on Society: A Recollection, 1953.
- Letters to My Daughter The Philosophical Library, 1954.
- Treasury of Philosophy (editor) The Philosophical Library, 1955.
- Treasury of World Literature (editor) The Philosophical Library, 1956.
- On the Nature of Man The Philosophical Library, 1956.
- Sartre, J.P., Being and Nothingness Translated by Hazel E. Barnes, The Philosophical Library, 1956.
- Pictorial History of Philosophy (editor) The Philosophical Library, 1959.
- A Dictionary of Thought (editor) Philosophical Library, 1959.
- A World without Jews (translator) The Philosophical Library, 1959.
- The Art of Thinking The Philosophical Library, 1961.
- A Treasury of World Science (editor) The Philosophical Library, 1962.
- Despotism: A Pictorial History of Tyranny (author) The Philosophical Library, 1963 Library of Congress Card catalog #62-22269
- The Disinterested and the Law The Philosophical Library, 1964.
- Philosophy for Everyman: From Socrates to Sartre, Philosophical Library, Library of Congress Card #68-22351, ©1968.
- German Existentialism by Martin Heidegger (trans. and introduction) Philosophical Library, Library of Congress Card No. 65-18052, 1965.

== Sources ==
- Pictorial History of Philosophy by Dagobert D. Runes, 1959.
- Karl Marx: Selected essays.” 1926
