= Edward Harcourt (philosopher) =

British philosopher

- Awards: Fellow of Keble College

Education
- Education: University of Oxford (PhD)

Philosophical work
- Era: 21st-century philosophy
- Region: Western philosophy
- School: Analytic
- Institutions: University of Oxford, Royal Institute of Philosophy
- Main interests: moral philosophy, practical ethics, Wittgenstein

Edward Harcourt is a British philosopher and Professor of philosophy at the University of Oxford. He has been a Fellow of Keble College, Oxford (since 2005), Mind Association Research Fellow, visiting research fellow at the University of California, Berkeley, and Wittgenstein Professor at the University of Innsbruck. Harcourt is the academic director of the Royal Institute of Philosophy. He is known for his works on moral philosophy and thick concepts.

== Books ==
- Attachment and Character: Attachment Theory, Ethics and the Developmental Psychology of Vice and Virtue (ed.), Oxford: Oxford University Press, 2021.
- Morality, Reflection, and Ideology (ed.), Oxford: Oxford University Press, 2000.
