= Socrates Cafe =

Gatherings where people exchange philosophical perspectives

A 2001 book written about Socrates Café by Christopher Phillips

Socrates Café are gatherings around the world where people from different backgrounds get together and exchange philosophical perspectives based on their experiences, using the version of the Socratic Method developed by founder Christopher Phillips. The groups model their discussions from the 2001 book of the same name by Christopher Phillips and a guide he also developed. Today, there are hundreds of such gatherings, coordinated by volunteers, worldwide.

== History ==
Socrates Cafés began in 1996, when Christopher Phillips, then a freelance writer and editorial consultant, desired to in some way build on the legacy of historical thinkers. He proposed Socratic dialogues with anyone who wished to become more empathetic, and more objectively critical and creative philosophical inquirers. Phillips' idea of having open-invitation meetings at cafes and other public places and spaces was inspired by Matthew Lipman, the founder of the Institute for the Advancement of Philosophy for Children who advocated introducing philosophy into schools and under whom Phillips studied, as well as by Marc Sautet, whose Café Philosophique Phillips became aware of after reading an article about Sautet in 1995. According to Phillips, his version of the Socratic Method was inspired not only by the Greek interrogative elements practiced by Socrates of the elenctic (Greek for 'cross examination,' 'encounter,' 'inquiry'), aporia (Greek for 'doubt') and maieutic (Greek for 'midwifery,' in this case giving birth to ideas one harbors from within), but by the philosopher Justus Buchler's notions of human judgment and query, by philosopher Walter Kaufmann's notion of the "Socratic type" and view that the Socratic Method boils down to the sustained consideration of objections and alternatives to any given way of seeing things, as well as by Hannah Arendt's notion of the Socratic persona and performativity. A typical Socrates Cafe group meets in a public place, is open to anyone who wishes to attend, and Socratically explores a question which is chosen by vote or which is announced shortly in advance. Typically there are no prerequisites, and no reading or other preparation is required.

== Socratic method ==
Janet Sisson, a philosophy professor at Mount Royal College, has questioned the appropriateness of identifying the methods and goals practiced by Phillips with those of the historical Socrates: "...the background for this enterprise [Socrates Café] is very different from that for the conversations of Socrates. Plato uses the figure of Socrates as a way of introducing the idea of intellectual discussion in order to promote the pursuit of truth, not as a path for personal discovery. ...To treat opportunities for dialogue as a means of self-discovery is a modern attitude, not the aim of Socrates own original dialectic. American scholars have sometimes encouraged this reading of Socratic endeavors; Phillips' fondness for this line of argument perhaps owes more to idealist or existentialist thinking than to Socrates himself." Sisson goes on to stress that "(t)his does not undermine the aim of Phillips' cafes..."

Philosopher Thomas Morris has praised the Socrates Cafe concept of good discussion about important topics by common people. David Blacker, professor of Philosophy of Education and Legal Studies at the University of Delaware, writes in Democratic Education Stretched Thin: How Complexity Challenges a Liberal Ideal (2007), that "one can...only applaud the efforts initiated by Christopher Phillips... In very much an extra-academic (but not anti-academic) spirit, Phillips has inspired individuals to create in their own communities voluntary groups who convene to discuss philosophical questions they themselves have chosen." (p. 146) Blacker considers the Socrates cafe endeavor to be a critical effort for evolving a democracy, the essential function and mission of which to him is for its citizens "to think for themselves about the lives they want to lead" (p. 146).

== See also ==
- Society for Philosophical Inquiry
- Philosophy For All
