= The Death of Postmodernism and Beyond =

2006 essay by Alan Kirby

"The Death of Postmodernism and Beyond" is an essay by the British cultural critic Alan Kirby. It was first published in the British journal Philosophy Now, no. 58 in 2006 and has been widely reproduced since. It became the basis for his book Digimodernism: How New Technologies Dismantle the Postmodern and Reconfigure our Culture, published by Continuum in 2009. The essay argues that postmodernism as a cultural period is over, and has given way to a new paradigm based on digital technology which he calls "pseudomodernism" (changed to "digimodernism" in the book).

The essay has been criticized for its vague reference to the 'banality' of current texts – Kirby defines pseudo-modernism as text which is created by the audience, for the audience, but then he places a wide range of texts under this category that seem not to belong, such as The Blair Witch Project and The Office. These texts, Kirby says, lack the self-aware irony that postmodernism was known for.

Kirby's essay forms part of a growing movement that emerged in the late 2000s and seeks to chart cultural developments in the aftermath of postmodernism, such as Nicolas Bourriaud's Altermodern (an exhibition at Tate Britain in 2009) and Raoul Eshelman's performatism.

== See also ==
- Altermodern
- Postmodernism
- Post-postmodernism
- Automavision
