= David Prall =

American philosopher

David Wight Prall (5 October 1886 – 21 October 1940) was an American philosopher of art and an academic. His interests include aesthetics, value theory, abstract ideas, truth and the history of philosophy. He is noted for his notion of aesthetic surfaces.

== Biography ==
Prall was born on 5 October 1886 in Saginaw, Michigan. Prall obtained his bachelor's degree from the University of Michigan, having studied mathematics, chemistry, English and German literature. He completed his master's degree on German studies and rhetoric in the same institution. He then received his PhD in philosophy from the University of California, Berkeley, in 1918.

Prall was Professor of Philosophy at Harvard University (1920–21; 1930–40). He taught also at Cornell (1910–12), the University of Texas (1912–14), Amherst (1918–19), and the University of California (1921–30). While at Harvard, Prall was a teacher and mentor to Leonard Bernstein, who dedicated his 1973 Norton lectures at Harvard to Prall's memory.

Prall died on 21 October 1940 in Berkeley, California, while on sabbatical from Harvard. His papers are held at Mills College, Oakland, California.

== Work ==
Prall criticized the positivist standards of beauty and academic inquiry. Instead, he emphasized the validation of experience and feeling. He maintained that the aesthetics field is not a rarified cerebral space reserved for the specialist. Prall's notion of aesthetic surfaces is distinguished from the beauty of art. He devoted a significant part of his work, Aesthetic Judgment (1929), to this concept and proposed linking it to content. This is said to transpire by thickening aesthetic surface to encompass art's intellectual, moral, and referential content.

On value theory, he maintained that there are no existent things that are values but there are entities, realities, and individual forms that are values.

== Publications ==
- Prall, D. W. (1918). "Concerning the Nature of Philosophy". Journal of Philosophy, Psychology and Scientific Methods. 15 (5): 127–130. doi:10.2307/2940377. JSTOR 2940377.
- Prall, D. W. (1921). "The Esthetic Heresy". Journal of Philosophy. 18 (19): 516–526. doi:10.2307/2939310. JSTOR 2939310.
- Prall, D. W. (1923). "In Defense of a Worthless Theory of Value". Journal of Philosophy. 20 (5): 128–137. doi:10.2307/2939368. JSTOR 2939368.
- Prall, D. W. (1924). "Value and Thought-Process". Journal of Philosophy. 21 (5): 117–125. doi:10.2307/2014348. JSTOR 2014348.
- Prall, D. W. (1925). "Essences and Universals". Journal of Philosophy. 22 (10): 264–272. doi:10.2307/2015099. JSTOR 2015099.
- Aesthetic Judgment. Thomas Y. Crowell. 1929.
- Prall, D. W. (1933). "A Case of the Pathetic Fallacy". Journal of Philosophy. 30 (5): 113–119. doi:10.2307/2016795. JSTOR 2016795.
- Aesthetic Analysis. Thomas Y. Crowell. 1936.
- Prall, D. W. (1938). "Knowledge as Aptness of the Body". Philosophical Review. 47 (2): 128–154. doi:10.2307/2180852. JSTOR 2180852.
