= Sarah Sawyer =

British philosopher

- Awards: Fellow of the Royal Society of Arts

Education
- Education: St Andrews University (BA), King's College London (MPhil, PhD)

Philosophical work
- Era: 21st-century philosophy
- Region: Western philosophy
- School: Analytic
- Institutions: University of Sussex, Royal Institute of Philosophy
- Main interests: philosophy of mind, philosophy of language, epistemology, metaphysics
- Website: Professional Website

Sarah Sawyer is a British philosopher and Professor of Philosophy at the University of Sussex where she is deputy director of the Sussex Centre for Consciousness Science and Associate Dean for Research and Innovation. She is known for her work on conceptual engineering. Sawyer is the vice-chair of the Royal Institute of Philosophy and has served as Associate Editor of the Australasian Journal of Philosophy.

== Books ==
- New waves in philosophy of language, Sarah Sawyer (ed.), New York: Palgrave-Macmillan 2009
- Concepts and Conceptual Engineering (a collection of essays in Persian), Sarah Sawyer, Tehran: Naqde Farhang, 2026
