= Science on Tap =

Science event in Israel

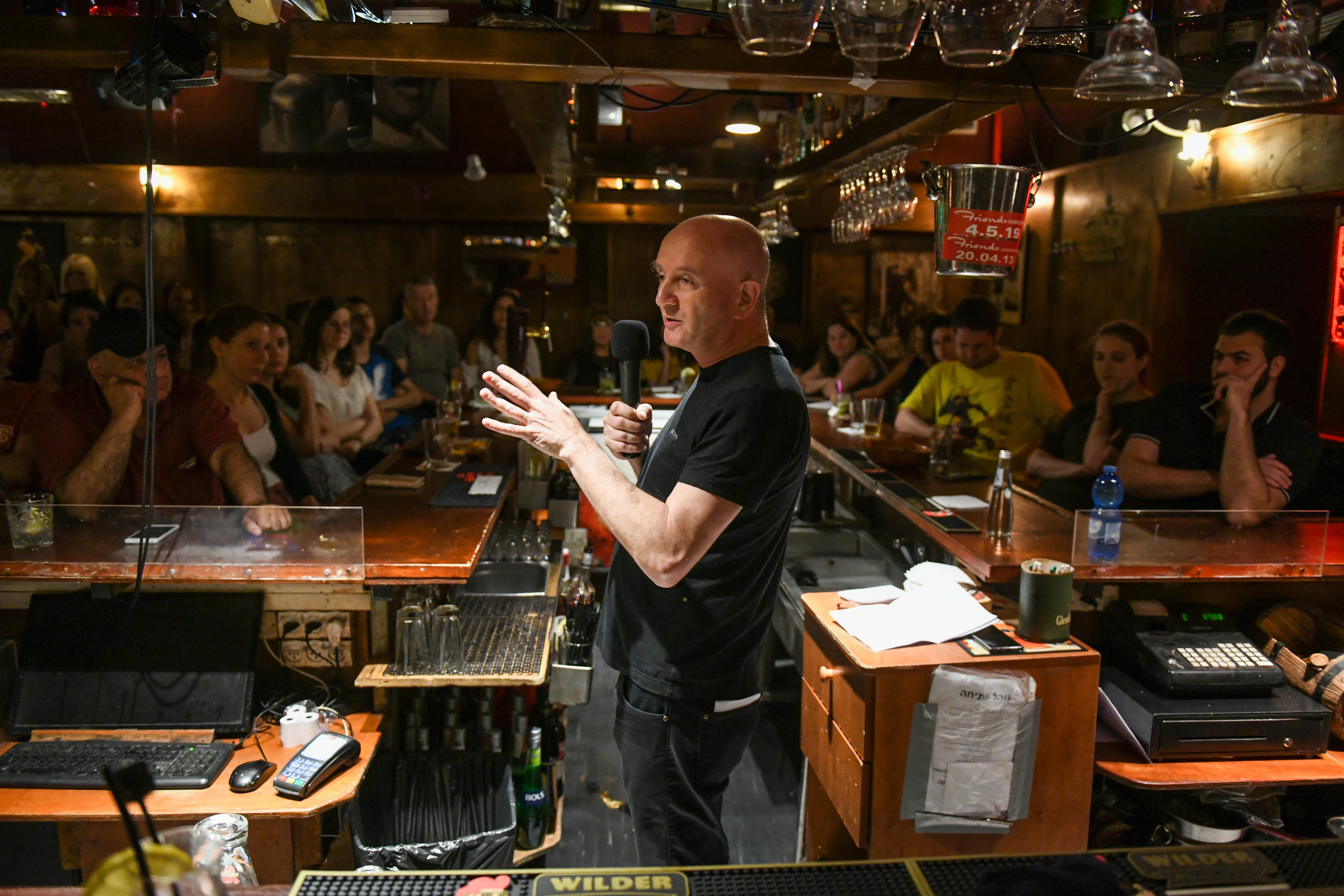
Daniel Zajfman at a Science on Tap event

Science on Tap is the social-cultural initiative of Yivsam Azgad, head of the Media Department and art curator of the Weizmann Institute of Science in Rehovot, Israel.

The project began in 2010, under the title "Beer, Science, and Fun", as a gesture to the city of Rehovot on its 120th anniversary. In this framework, some 35 scientists and graduate students went to bars and pubs in Rehovot to talk with the patrons about open questions in science and the newest advances on the forefront of global science. On the same night, research students went to the city center and led a “science comics” session for children in which they created their own science comics, inspired by the Nano Comics series put out by the Weizmann Institute of Science and edited by Yivsam Azgad.

This initiative was highly successful and was covered by the media in Israel and the world. The scientists, artists, and politicians posed a challenge to the organizers: To reproduce this success in Tel Aviv.

In response to the challenge, Azgad decided, with the support of the Weizmann Institute of Science president, Prof. Daniel Zajfman, to organize the event in Tel Aviv under a new name: Science on Tap. This event, preceded by a creative ad campaign, included the participation of 70 scientists from the Weizmann Institute of Science speaking in different bars, all at the same time, with free entrance for all. The wild success of this venture led to a significant change in the entertainment culture in Tel Aviv in particular and in Israel in general. Dozens of similar projects, all with the “on Tap” format, (Doctors on Tap, Law on Tap, Knesset Members on Tap, Stock Market on Tap, etc.) were introduced. Similar events have also been put on in London, Boston, Panama City and other places around the world.

Science on Tap is an annual event in Tel Aviv and is conducted jointly by the Weizmann Institute of Science, Time Out Tel Aviv magazine, and often the Tel Aviv municipality. It remains the largest event of its kind.
