= Pub philosophy =

Philosophical discussions in pubs

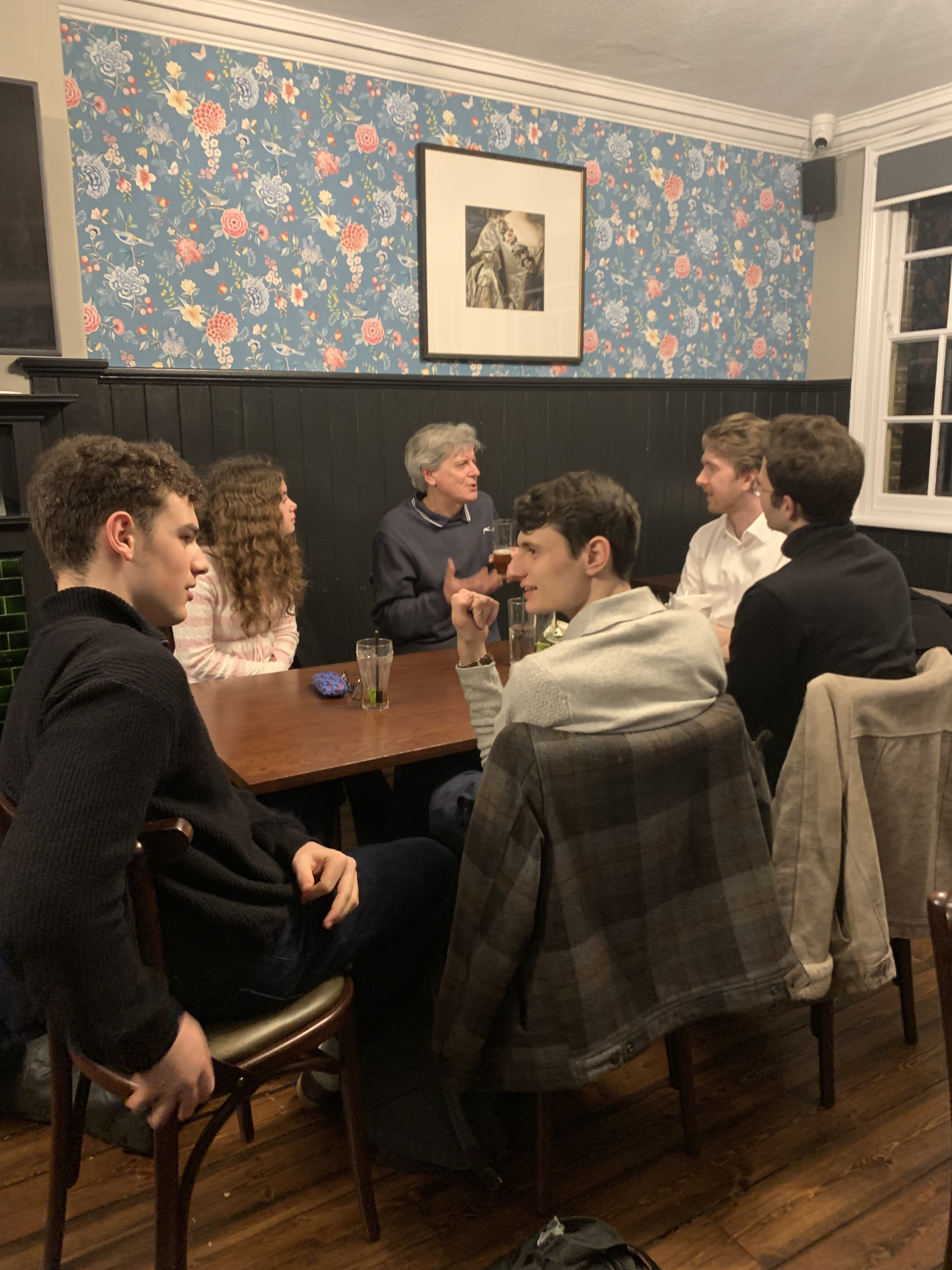
The Veins of London pub philosophy group

Pub philosophy is a term sometimes used to describe organised gatherings in public houses for philosophical discussion. Several series of events in the United Kingdom and elsewhere offer pub philosophy in a variety of formats, typically involving an invited speaker and some degree of open discussion. Such events are a form of philosophy cafe.

While these groups are often run by amateurs, have sometimes been recruited by more mainstream institutions to provide a distinctively participatory public forum. Such alliances have included Tate Liverpool and University of Chester working with Philosophy in Pubs, the Brighton Science Festival 2010 working with PIPS Brighton and the London School of Economics producing an event in collaboration with Big Ideas.

== London ==
- Big Ideas
- Kant's Cave (by Philosophy For All)
- Café Philo (Institut français du Royaume-Uni)
- Thoughts Experiments in Pubs (TEiP)
- Veins of London
- London Philosophy Café
- Philosophy Café London
- Philosophy Cabin

== Other ==
- Living Philosophy (based in Tintern, Wales UK)
- PhiloMadrid (based in Madrid, Spain)
- Philosophy In Pubs (based in Liverpool, UK)
- PIPS Brighton (based in Brighton, UK)
- The Stoa (based in Deal, Kent, Kent, UK)
- Skeptics in the Pub (London, UK + others)
- Thinking While Drinking (based in San Diego, California)

== See also ==
- List of public house topics
- Café Philosophique
- Socrates Cafe
- Viennese café
