= Royal Institute of Philosophy =

British charitable organization

- Established: 1925
- President: Jonathan Wolff
- Staff: Lucy O'Brien (Chair of the Council); Sarah Sawyer (Vice-Chair of the Council); Edward Harcourt (academic director)
- Location: London, England
- Website: royalinstitutephilosophy.org

The Royal Institute of Philosophy, founded in 1925, is a charitable organisation that holds and funds lectures and events on philosophical topics. It publishes two journals and offers grant programmes as part of its mission to share philosophical speculation as widely as practicable.

== History ==
While waiting to go into prison for sponsoring an anti-war pamphlet in 1916, Bertrand Russell gave his Lectures on Logical Atomism in the hall where the Institute's annual lecture series are now held. He finished them just before he was incarcerated. The Home Secretary, Arthur Balfour, gave the extraordinary instruction that the prisoner should be allowed writing materials in his cell, in which he produced his Introduction to Mathematical Philosophy, published in 1919. Russell, together with Balfour, L. T. Hobhouse, Samuel Alexander, Harold Laski, and the Institute's Journal's first editor, Sydney Hooper, founded the Institute, originally known as the British Institute of Philosophical Studies, in 1925.

The first President of the Institute was Lord Balfour, succeeded in 1930 by Herbert Samuel, in 1959 by Lord Halsbury, in 1991 by Anthony Quinton, and in 2006 by Sir Anthony Kenny. Sir Anthony, the current President, has been Master of Balliol College, Oxford and President of the British Academy. He is author of many philosophical books and articles, and he gave the Institute’s Annual Lecture in 2007. Sir David Ross was for many years Chairman of Council, and Professor Hywel Lewis for many years after him. He was succeeded by the then Vice-Chancellor of the University of London, Stewart Sutherland, Baron Sutherland of Houndwood. After almost 20 years of service to the Institute, Lord Sutherland was succeeded by Professor Ted Honderich, Emeritus Grote Professor of Mind and Logic at University College London

Professor H. B. Acton, Director of the Institute while Professor at Bedford College, London, who is commemorated by occasional special lectures, was succeeded by Professor Godfrey Vesey, the founding Professor of Philosophy of the Open University. On his retirement after 13 years as Director he was appointed Fellow of the Institute in 1979. Professor Anthony O'Hear of the University of Bradford became Director in the session 1994-95. In 2019, the new Academic Director was named as Julian Baggini, and he was succeeded by Professor Edward Harcourt in 2022. The Institute's title of Royal was granted in 1947. The Institute's managing director since 2022 is Melanie Nightingale.

== Activities ==
- The publication of Philosophy
- The publication of Think
- The London Lecture Series
- The Annual Lectures (London, Edinburgh, Dublin and Cardiff)
- The Institute’s Local Partners Scheme
- The Jacobsen Fellowships
- The Institute’s Bursaries
- Philosophy in Schools
- The Annual Debate

== Presidents ==
- 1925 - 1930 Earl of Balfour
- 1931 - 1958 Viscount Samuel
- 1959 - 1990 Tony Giffard, 3rd Earl of Halsbury
- 1991 - 2006 Lord Quinton
- 2006 - 2009 Anthony Kenny
- 2009 - 2018 Stewart Sutherland
- 2019- 2022 Onora O'Neill
- From 2023 Jo Wolff

== Chairs ==
- 1925–1929 L. T. Hobhouse
- 1929–1940 J. H. Muirhead
- 1940–1963 Sir W. David Ross
- 1965–1988 Hywel Lewis
- 1989–2005 Stewart Sutherland
- 2006–2009 Ted Honderich
- 2010–2021 John Haldane
- 2021–present Lucy O'Brien
