= Justus Buchler =

American philosopher

- Buchler in 1979
- Born: March 27, 1914; New York City, U.S.
- Died: March 19, 1991 (aged 76); Chambersburg, Pennsylvania, U.S.

Education
- Education: Columbia University (PhD, 1938)
- Doctoral advisor: John Herman Randall Jr.

Philosophical work
- Era: 20th-century philosophy
- Region: Western philosophy
- School: Pragmatism (pragmatic naturalism)
- Institutions: Columbia University
- Notable ideas: Natural complex

Justus Buchler (/ˈbjuːklər/; March 27, 1914 – March 19, 1991) was an American philosopher, author and professor. He made contributions to the subjects of naturalism and metaphysics, introducing the concept of the natural complex.

== Biography ==
Buchler was born in New York City, the eldest of three children of rabbi Samuel Buchler and Ida Frost Buchler. Buchler's sister, Beatrice Buchler Gotthold, was the founding editor of Working Woman magazine, and the first female vice president of the New York Times Company.

Buchler earned his Ph.D. in 1938 from Columbia University; his dissertation was published in 1939 as Charles Peirce's Empiricism. In 1942, Buchler became a full-time instructor at Columbia, where he and mentor John Herman Randall Jr. co-authored the textbook Philosophy: An Introduction. In 1950, Buchler became an associate professor at Columbia; in 1956, he was promoted to full professor.

In 1971, Buchler became Distinguished Professor of Philosophy at the State University of New York at Stony Brook, where he founded a graduate program in philosophical perspectives. In 1972, Buchler was among the founders of the Society for the Advancement of American Philosophy. In 1973, he was awarded the Butler Silver Medal by Columbia University.

== Philosophical work ==
Buchler's keystone work, Metaphysics of Natural Complexes, builds upon two major principles: ontological parity, which asserts the equal reality of whatever is, and ordinal metaphysics, which asserts the indefinite complexity of whatever is.

Contrasted most clearly with pre-Socratic philosophers, Buchler believed there was no most simple, fundamental substance or element that comprised the universe. Rather, everything is a complex—specifically a natural complex.

All complexes are located within orders, which Buchler defines as 'a sphere of relatedness'. "Every complex—whether entity, process, relation, or possibility—is what it is in virtue of its locatedness in orders, or 'ordinal locations'. Every complex shares traits or locations with other complexes. Moreover, every complex is itself an order and, hence, is uniquely determinate, that is, different from every other complex."

Buchler's earlier books develop his 'metaphysics of human process'. In Toward a General Theory of Human Judgment, Buchler exchanges experience with a broader concept that he calls proception. "According to Buchler, judgment appraises and discriminates some feature or features of the world... and moves toward 'justification' or validation... As a proceiver, one assimilates features of the world in which one is located and seeks to communicate both to oneself and to others aspects of oneself and of the world that is being perceived."

== Critical reception ==
In 1959, a double issue of The Journal of Philosophy was devoted to Buchler's work. Since original publication, however, Buchler's work has been considered to be outside the dominant analytic trends in philosophy. In Creativity in American Philosophy (1984), Charles Hartshorne comments on Buchler's central concept of natural complexes: "I think almost the entire history of philosophy is against such an idea. Only considerable courage could have made it seem worthwhile to challenge this tradition."

In his 2002 book Socrates Cafe, Christopher Phillips wrote that "Buchler's novel approach to metaphysics seems to herald what Lee Smolin calls 'the lightness of the new search for knowledge'. This search, he says, is based on an underlying philosophy that 'the universe is a network of relations'."

== Political activism ==
Buchler was an active opponent of McCarthyism, co−authoring the paper "Academic Due Process: A Statement of Desirable Procedures Applicable within Educational Institutions in Cases Involving Academic Freedom" in 1954. In 1961, he co-authored Academic Freedom and Civil Liberties of Students in Colleges and Universities and Teacher Disclosure of Information about Students to Prospective Employers; the latter was adopted as a policy statement of the ACLU. From 1958 to 1965, Buchler was Vice Chairman for the National Academic Freedom Committee of the ACLU.

== Works ==
Primary books

- Charles Peirce's Empiricism (1939)
- Toward a General Theory of Human Judgment (1951)
- Nature and Judgment (1955)
- The Concept of Method (1961)
- Metaphysics of Natural Complexes (1966)
- The Main of Light: On the Concept of Poetry (1974)

Other books

- Obiter scripta : lectures, essays and reviews / by George Santayana, edited by Justus Buchler and Benjamin Schwartz (1936)
- Editor: The Philosophy of Peirce: Selected Writings (1940)
- With John H. Randall Jr.: Philosophy: An Introduction (1942)

Selected articles

- "Russell and the Principle of Ethics", in The Philosophy of Bertrand Russell (1944)
- "The Liberal Arts and General Education" (1952)
- "What Is the Pragmaticist Theory of Meaning?", in Studies in the Philosophy of Charles Sanders Peirce, pp. 21−32 (1952)
- "On the Problem of Liberal Education" (1954)
- "What Is a Discussion?" (1954)
- "Reconstruction in the Liberal Arts" (1954)
- "Ontological Parity", in Naturalism and Historical Understanding: Essays on the Philosophy of John Herman Randall, Jr. (1967)
- "On the Concept of 'The World"', Review of Metaphysics 31, pp. 555–79 (1978)
- "Probing the Idea of Nature", Process Studies 8, pp. 157–68 (1979)

== See also ==
- American philosophy
