= John Herman Randall Jr. =

American philosopher

John Herman "Jack" Randall Jr. (February 14, 1899 – December 1, 1980) was an American pragmatic naturalist philosopher.

== Early life ==
Randall was born on February 14, 1899, in Grand Rapids, Michigan. The son of John Herman Randall Sr., a Baptist minister, he obtained his A.B. from Columbia University in 1918. He obtained an A.M. the following year and a PhD in 1922, with a dissertation titled "The Problem of Group Responsibility to Society". He was influenced by a close group of friends, including James Gutmann, Horace Fries, Herbert Schneider and Irwin Edman. Other influences were his teacher John Dewey, Frederick J. E. Woodbridge, John J. Cross, Wendell T. Bush, stockbroker Albert Redpath and historian Frank Tannenbaum. He married Mercedes Irene Moritz in New York on December 23, 1922, with whom he had two sons, John Herman Randall III and Francis Ballard Randall.

== Career ==
Randall was hired as a philosophy lecturer by Columbia in 1920 and he stayed at the university for the remainder of his career. He was promoted to assistant professor of philosophy at Columbia in 1925. He was a member of the American Philosophical Association, the Ethical Culture Society, Alpha Delta Phi and Phi Beta Kappa. He served as president of the Metaphysical Society of America in 1967. For fifteen years at Columbia University, he served as the Chair of the University Seminar on The Renaissance which he co-founded with Paul Oskar Kristeller. His students include John P. Anton.

He published The Problem of Group Responsibility in 1922 and The Making of the Modern Mind in 1926. He also coauthored The Introduction to Contemporary Civilization and wrote an influential study of Aristotle, entitled simply Aristotle. Some of his other books include Nature and Historical Experience, a collection of essays on metaphysics and the philosophy of history, How Philosophy Uses Its Past, The Role of Knowledge in Western Religion, Plato: Dramatist of the Life of Reason, Hellenistic Ways of Deliverance and the Making of the Christian Synthesis, and The Career of Philosophy, a three-volume history of philosophy from the Middle Ages through the twentieth century. He was one of signers of the Humanist Manifesto in 1933.

He was the doctoral advisor of Justus Buchler.

== Death ==
Randall died in New York City in 1980.

== See also ==
- American philosophy
- List of American philosophers
