= Café philosophique =

Grassroots forum for philosophical discussion, founded by Marc Sautet in Paris in 1992

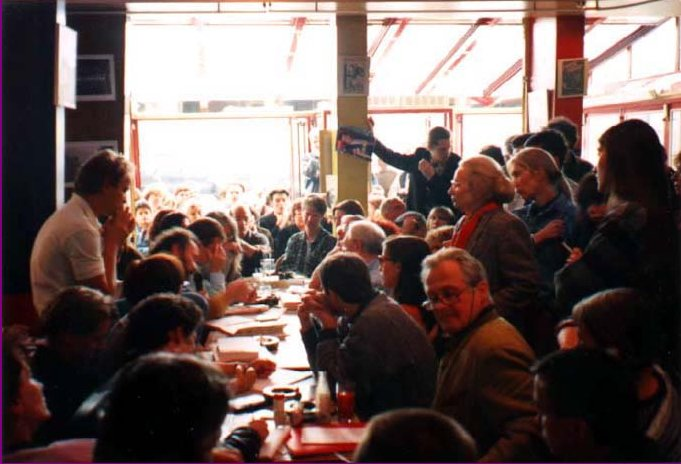
Marc Sautet at Café des Phares (Paris 1994)

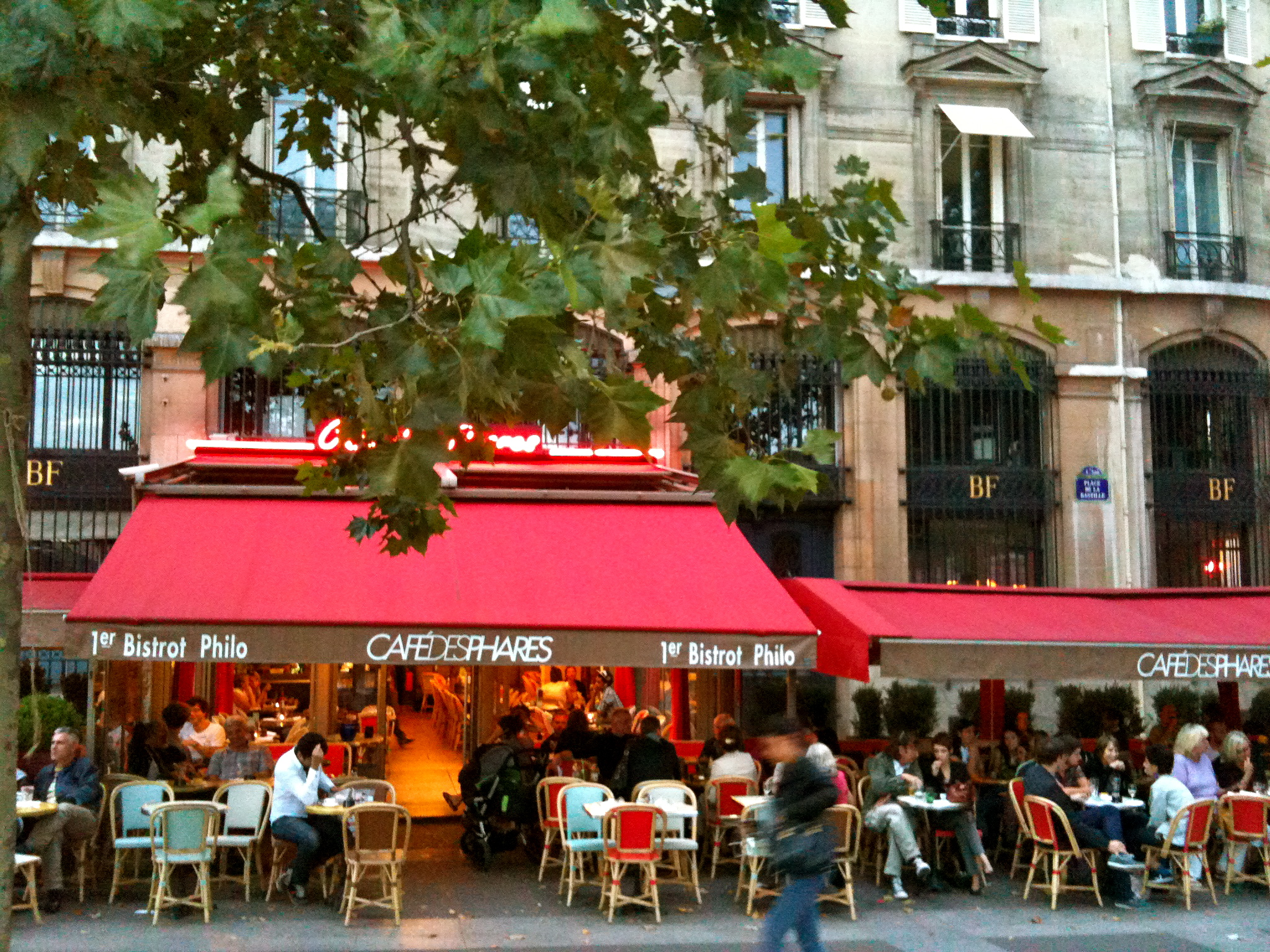
The Café des Phares (Paris) - the first café philosophique in the world

Café philosophique (or café-philo) is a grassroots forum for philosophical discussion, founded by philosopher Marc Sautet in Paris, France, on December 13, 1992.

There were about 100 cafés-philo operating throughout France and some 150 cafés-philo internationally at the time of Sautet's death in 1998.

== Concept ==
The subjects discussed at the cafés had a range that varied from the Santa Claus myth to truth to beauty to sex to death. They posed such questions as What is a fact? and Is hope a violent thing? Sautet made the discussions seem fun and exciting. The concept was to bring people together in a public friendly forum where they could discuss ideas. A café tended to have this type of atmosphere where people were relaxed drinking coffee and carrying on conversations. This concept ultimately developed into the Café Philosophique that he founded.

Thousands of participants in philosophy cafés worldwide have adopted Sautet's idea as a way to enhance their thinking. Ideas are thrown out with concern for accuracy and philosophical rigor. The concepts discussed were in the spirit of tolerance and openness. The idea of Sautet's philosophy cafés have spread around the world. The concept that started in France and subsequently entered England, Germany, Belgium, Austria, Switzerland, Finland and eventually throughout Europe is now in Canada, South America, Greece, Australia, Japan, Hong Kong, and the United States. Due to this success, the French president Jacques Chirac sent a founding member on a good will mission to Latin America to introduce the concept there.

== History ==
=== Predecessors ===
The French Institute for Scotland in Edinburgh also runs a café philosophique in Edinburgh - continuing a tradition that dates back to the days of the great Francophile philosopher David Hume. Staff of The French Institute for Scotland are also involved in teaching philosophy in Scottish primary schools, as an example in Clackmannan. In England, a Café Philosophique has been meeting in a Cromford (Derbyshire) bookshop café since being founded by Wirksworth philosopher-potter Evan Rutherford in 1993, and by 2009 had held around 100 meetings. The public evenings are usually led by members and associates of the ever-changing group rather than by professional philosophers, but prospective speakers are welcome to propose topics; the text of some of the talks can be read online.

The Ottoman Empire expanded throughout Europe in the 17th century. From Vienna came the idea of a place where men could meet and discuss various topics over coffee or tea (Viennese coffee house culture). Adapted to Western culture, the Turkish "cafés" became the place where friends met for a drink. The tradition of the Agora was moved from the public square to the center city café. Philosophers, poets, writers, and intellectuals of all types made these places their new meeting places.The first Oxford coffee house opened in 1650 and in London in 1652

In 1686 the Sicilian Francesco Procopio dei Coltelli started Café Procope in rue de l'Ancienne Comédie, in the Latin Quarter of Paris known as the 6th arrondissement. It was the first café in Paris. Certain intellectuals that have frequented the café for philosophical discussions throughout history have been Victor Hugo, Paul Verlaine, Honoré de Balzac, Pierre Augustin Caron de Beaumarchais, François-Marie Arouet, Jean-Jacques Rousseau, Georges Danton, Jean-Paul Marat, and Denis Diderot amongst others.

For about 30 years in Paris, poets, painters, writers and part of the surrealist movement went to cafés of Montparnasse. Also in Paris after World War II the cafés of the Latin quarter saw a form of existentialism. The philosopher Jean-Paul Sartre conducted philosophical discussions at the Café de Flore. These "cafés philo" were the historical beginnings of Sautet's cafés-philo.

=== Café philosophique ===
Sautet started the idea of philosophy cafés in the Place de la Bastille neighborhood of Paris at the Café des Phares on December 13, 1992. He would gather some friends at his "café philo" each Sunday at 11 am and opened up philosophical debates ("conceptual fisticuffs") for some two hours. His philosophy was a return to the basic principles of reasoning intended for the general public, not aristocrats. The first meetings started with only a dozen or so people. Soon university students showed up, followed by eccentric citizens off the street, off-duty cab drivers, and idle wealthy women. This became a weekly event that grew in popularity to about 200 people at each meeting. Sautet returned philosophy to the general public in Café Philosophique. In so doing, he was rejected by scholars as being unfaithful to the normal philosophy taught in higher education.

== See also ==
- Lincoln Philosophy Café
- Philosophy For All
- Philosophy Now
- Pub Philosophy
- Socrates Cafe
- Society for Philosophical Inquiry
- Think (journal)
- Viennese café
- Sofia kafe
