= Society for Philosophical Inquiry =

Non-profit organization

- Company type: 501 (c) 3 nonprofit
- Founded: 1998
- Founder: Christopher Phillips
- Key people: Christopher Phillips, Founder, Cecilia Chapa Phillips, Co-Founder
- Website: www.philosopher.org

The Society for Philosophical Inquiry (SPI) is a non-profit organization devoted to propagating a version of Socratic inquiry through the establishment of regular meetings. Based on their different settings, they are called Socrates Café, Philosophers' Club, these meetings take place all over the world. The purpose of these meetings is to facilitate discussion of philosophy.

Christopher and Cecilia Phillips co-founded SPI in 1998. The Society is funded through a grant from the Whitman Institute in San Francisco.

== History ==
SPI is a grassroots nonprofit organization devoted to supporting philosophical inquirers of all ages and walks of life as they become more empathetic and autonomous thinkers who take active part in creating a more deliberative democracy. Its members strive to form and facilitate "democratic communities of philosophical inquiry". Their gatherings - which, depending on the setting, occasion and purpose, have such names as Socrates Café, Philosophers’ Club, bring together people from a wide array of walks of life and experiences. They take place in venues like parks, coffee houses, hospices, senior centers, nursing homes, prisons, plazas, bookstores, homeless shelters, community centers, libraries, schools, and other public spaces.

Board members include: Matthew Lipman, Robert Coles, Roy J. Nirschel, president of Roger Williams University, and Jacob Needleman, professor of philosophy.

== See also ==
- Socrates Café
- Lincoln Philosophy Café
