= Marc Sautet =

French philosopher (1947–1998)

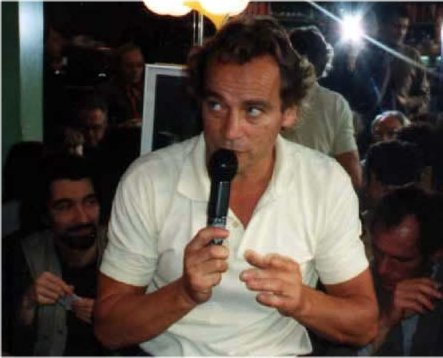
- Marc Sautet 1994 at Cafe des Phares
- Born: 25 February 1947; Normandy, France
- Died: 3 March 1998 (aged 51); Paris, France
- Occupation: French philosopher

Marc Sautet (French pronunciation: [maʁk sotɛ]; 25 February 1947 – 3 March 1998) was a French writer, teacher, translator (mainly of Nietzsche), and philosopher. He was a Doctor of Philosophy (B. Litt.) at the Paris Institute of Political Studies. Sautet was a former Trotskyist who however edited two books on the German philosopher and philologist Friedrich Nietzsche. Marc Sautet emphasised that Nietzsche was a precursor of his time.

Sautet branched out from his normal academic career as a lecturer by giving philosophy consultation services to businessmen in the bourgeois district of Le Marais in Paris around 1990 to 1991. He opened up his "cabinet de philosophie" charging consultation fees of some 200 Francs an hour, an amount similar to a professional psychoanalyst of the time. This was not a successful enterprise for Sautet, however it did lead him to setting up informal philosophising for the ordinary citizen in Parisian cafes starting in 1992 (the Café Philosophique). He called this movement "café for Socrates," which became the title of one of his books (1995).

Sautet seemed to have been a quite likeable person that influenced others considerably. He wished his philosophy cafes to be for all people (parleurs de la taverne)) and to encourage freedom of expression regardless of academic background. He did not want power, money, nor religion to influence the discussions. He wished to revive the Socratic method at the meetings. He claimed, I help my clients to structure their thoughts. I am there to nourish their doubts and pose the right questions, not to supply the answers.

Sautet considered his work, after Freud, as the practice of a sort of medicine (philotherapy). He desired to cure the European civilization of moral deterioration. He followed with passion international events, especially in Europe. Sautet wanted to bring people's everyday problems and ideas to birth.

== Philosophy cafe ==
Sautet, who has sometimes been labeled the "modern Socrates," wished to recreate the agora - the Athens marketplace where Athenian philosophers and the general public met for social gatherings and talks. The rules of his Café Philosophique, also referred to as "cafés-philos", were that the speaker was to talk to everyone at all times, not to any individual. The speaker was not to be an expert on any subject and one person (probably the moderator) was to pick the topic of discussion.

== Spin-off cafes ==
Café Scientifique, started in 1998, is based on the Sautet's concept.

== See also ==
- Socratic method
- Pseudophilosophy

== Bibliography ==
- Par-delà le bien et le mal, 2000.
- A quoi sert la philosophie, 1998.
- Les Femmes ? De leur émancipation, 1998.
- Les Philosophes à la question, 1996
- Un café pour Socrate, Paris : Éditions Robert Laffont, 1995.
- Nietzsche pour débutants, 1986.
- Nietzsche et la Commune, 1981.
