= Teaching Philosophy =

- Discipline: Philosophy, education
- Language: English
- Edited by: Maralee Harrell

Publication details
- History: 1975–present
- Publisher: Philosophy Documentation Center
- Frequency: Quarterly

Standard abbreviations
- ISO 4: Teach. Philos.

Indexing
- ISSN: 0145-5788 (print); 2153-6619 (web)
- LCCN: 76-649637
- OCLC no.: 2773264

Links
- Journal homepage; Online access; Special issues

Teaching Philosophy is a peer-reviewed academic journal devoted to the practical and theoretical discussion of teaching and learning philosophy, that is philosophy education. Established by Arnold Wilson in 1975, it has published more than 2,500 articles and reviews in this field. Notable contributors include Norman Bowie, Myles Brand, Peter Caws, Angela Davis, Daniel Dennett, Alasdair MacIntyre, Rosalind Ladd, Michael Pritchard, Anita Silvers, and Robert C. Solomon. Members of the American Association of Philosophy Teachers and the Philosophy Learning and Teaching Organization have access as a benefit of membership. This journal has a Level 1 classification from the Publication Forum of the Federation of Finnish Learned Societies. and a SHERPA/RoMEO "green" self-archiving policy. It is published on behalf of the Teaching Philosophy Association by the Philosophy Documentation Center.

== Topics covered ==
Topics frequently covered include:

- Teaching methods and the use of new instructional material
- Experimental and interdisciplinary courses with philosophical content
- Evaluation of teaching and assessment of learning in philosophy
- Critical examination of pedagogical problems
- Reviews of books, instructional media, software, and Web-based resources

== Indexing ==
Teaching Philosophy is abstracted and indexed in Academic Search Premier, Arts & Humanities Citation Index, Contents Pages in Education, Education Research Index, ERIH PLUS, Expanded Academic ASAP, FRANCIS, Google Scholar, Index Philosophicus, InfoTrac OneFile, International Bibliography of Book Reviews of Scholarly Literature, International Bibliography of Periodical Literature, International Philosophical Bibliography, MLA International Bibliography, Periodicals Index Online, Philosopher's Index, PhilPapers, Scopus, and TOC Premier.

== Awards ==
The following articles have received the biennial 'Mark Lenssen Prize for Publishing on Teaching Philosophy' from the American Association of Philosophy Teachers:

- Ann J. Cahill and Stephen Bloch-Schulman, "Argumentation Step-By-Step: Learning Critical Thinking through Deliberative Practice", Vol.35, Nr.1 (March 2012), pp. 41–62.
- John Rudisill, "The Transition from Studying Philosophy to Doing Philosophy", Vol.34, Nr.3 (September 2011), pp. 241–271.
- Daryl Close, "Fair Grades", Vol.32, Nr. 4 (December 2009), pp. 361–398.
- David W. Concepción, "Reading Philosophy with Background Knowledge and Metacognition", Vol.27, Nr.4 (December 2004), pp. 351–368.
- James Campbell, "The Ambivalence toward Teaching in the Early Years of the American Philosophical Association", Vol.25, Nr.1 (March 2002), pp. 53–68.
- Deborah Barnbaum, "Teaching Empathy in Medical Ethics: The Use of Lottery Assignments", Vol.24, Nr.1 (March 2001), pp. 63–75.

== See also ==
- List of philosophy journals
