= Markosyan =

Markosyan or Markosian (Armenian: Մարկոսյան) is an Armenian surname that may refer to the following notable people:

- Diana Markosian (born 1989), American artist of Armenian descent
- Karen Markosyan (born 1968), Armenian football midfielder
- Ned Markosian, American philosopher
- Suren Markosyan (born 1984), Armenian freestyle wrestler
- Martin Markosyan (born 2008), Bulgarian, songwriter, drummer and member of the grunge band Shepot.
