= Bowling Green Studies in Applied Philosophy =

- Discipline: Philosophy
- Language: English

Publication details
- History: 1979–1986
- Publisher: Philosophy Documentation Center
- Frequency: Annual

Standard abbreviations
- ISO 4: Bowl. Green Stud. Appl. Philos.

Indexing
- ISSN: 1946-4290 (print); 1946-4304 (web)
- LCCN: 82-22179
- OCLC no.: 7762186

Links
- Journal homepage; Online access

Bowling Green Studies in Applied Philosophy is a series of conference proceedings produced by the philosophy department at Bowling Green State University on the subject of applied philosophy. Each volume consists of selected papers presented at the annual conference on applied philosophy held at Bowling Green from 1979 to 1986. These conferences were sponsored by the university's Applied Philosophy Program with support from the National Endowment for the Humanities. The eight volumes in this series explore the philosophical implications of social problems whose solutions require rational planning and decision making. The series was produced in cooperation with the Philosophy Documentation Center. Contributors to the series include Frithjof Bergmann, Myles Brand, David Hoekema, Jaegwon Kim, Joseph Margolis, Jan Narveson, Douglas Rasmussen, Nicholas Rescher, Robert C. Solomon, James Sterba, and Iris Young.

== Volumes in the series ==
- Values and Moral Standing - Volume 8, 1986
- The Restraint of Liberty - Volume 7, 1985
- Social Policy and Conflict Resolution - Volume 6, 1984
- The Applied Turn in Contemporary Philosophy - Volume 5, 1983
- Social Justice - Volume 4, 1982
- Reason and Decision - Volume 3, 1981
- Actions and Responsibility - Volume 2, 1980
- Understanding Human Emotions - Volume 1, 1979
