= Cégep de Sherbrooke =

Public college in Sherbrooke, Quebec

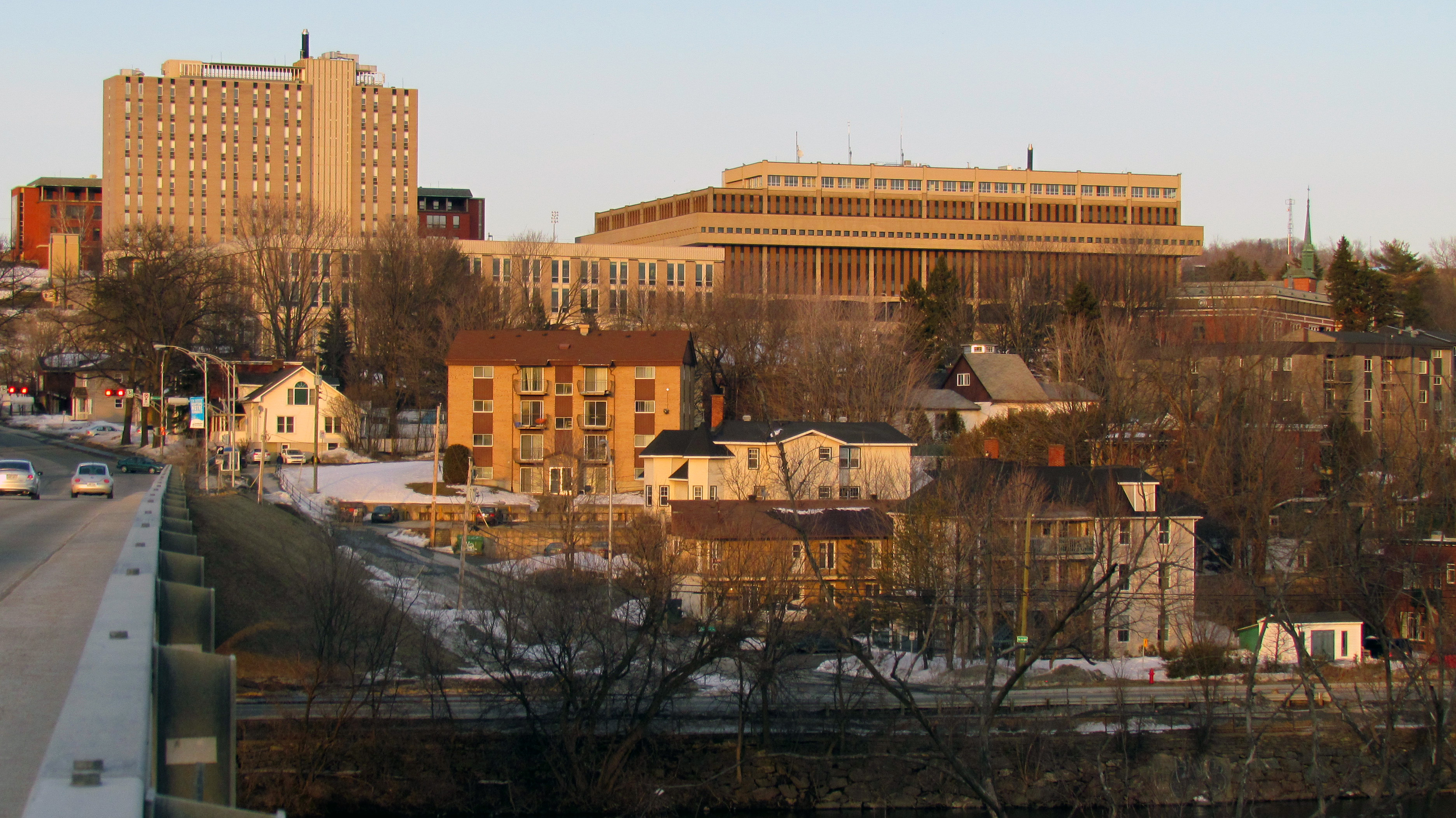
- Former names: Collège de Sherbrooke (1968-2005)
- Motto: Imaginons la suite
- Motto in English: Imagine the next step
- Type: Public
- Established: 15 May 1968; 58 years ago
- Academic affiliations: ACCC, CCAA, QSSF, AUCC,
- Endowment: CA$5.000 million
- Budget: CA$72.696 million
- Principal: Éric Gagné
- Academic staff: 596 (Total) 443 (Full-time)
- Administrative staff: 100 (Total) 79 (Full-time)
- Students: 5616
- Location: Sherbrooke, Quebec, Canada; 45°24′36″N 71°53′06″W
- Campus: Urban, 10 acres (4.0 ha)
- Colours: Blue, green
- Website: cegepsherbrooke.qc.ca/officiel
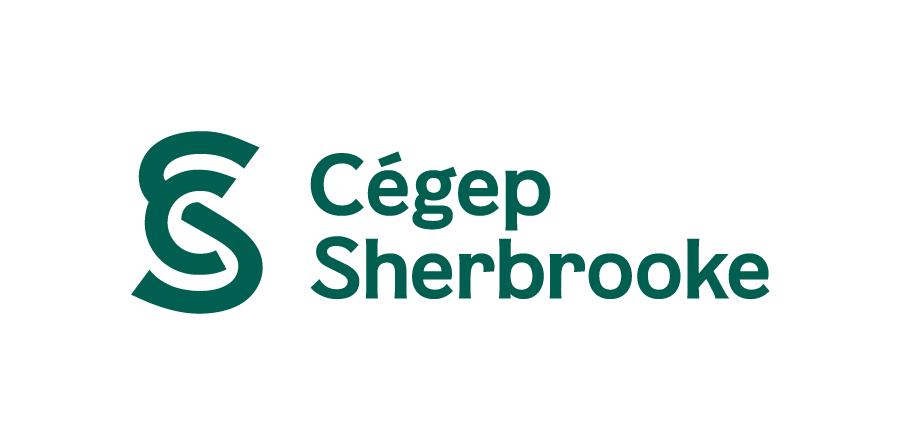

The Cégep de Sherbrooke, formerly known as the Collège de Sherbrooke (1968-2005), is a public college located in the city of Sherbrooke, Quebec, Canada. It was founded in 1968 during the aftermath of the Parent Commission, originally encompassing campuses in the towns of Sherbrooke, Thetford Mines and Granby. Initially occupying two campuses on each side of the city, the college was relocated entirely to its current location in 1975. In the following years, the school oversaw an expansion in its number of buildings (referred to internally as Pavillons) on and outside of its campus, consisting today of 7 on-campus buildings, a location in Val-des-Sources which offers certain basic classes and the CRIFA (Centre régional d’initiatives et de formation en agriculture), a partnered establishment that specializes in agricultural education, located in the nearby town of Coaticook.

Today, approximately 6000 students attend the Cégep de Sherbrooke annually, making the Cégep de Sherbrooke the largest college in Quebec outside of Montreal. Students study in one of approximately 30 different programs in both pre-university and technical programs.

== History ==
=== 1968 - 1975 ===
In 1968, the Collège de Sherbrooke was founded by ministerial decree and was initially placed in the west of Sherbrooke. The Collège de Sherbrooke was also responsible for the colleges in Granby and Thetford Mines, later separating from the administration in Sherbrooke: the Cégep de Thetford in 1969 and the Cégep de Granby in 1980. Due to an unprecedented influx of students, a total of 1730 in September 1968, the eastern campus was created the year after with the opening of the Pavillon 3, located in the former École normale du Sacré-Coeur. It is the oldest continuous pavillon that is currently part of the Cégep de Sherbrooke, housing the social sciences facilities and affiliated programs.

From 1969 to 1975, the college continued to be split between the east and west campuses, however, only the eastern campus saw continuous expansion. The Pavillon 4 was opened in 1970, housing the department of arts and linguistics. Furthermore, the administration of the Collège de Sherbrooke moved to the Pavillon 5 two years after.

The construction of the Pavillon 1 and 2 began in 1973 and 1974 respectively. The latter replaced a Daughters of Charity residence, which had previously been rented and bought by the college. As for the Pavillon 2, it replaced the former Pavillon Notre-Dame-de-France, known at the time as the Pavillon 6. Before its acquisition by the Collège de Sherbrooke in 1970, it was known as the Sherbrooke Hospital. It first became the center for the nursing program under the college's administration.

While the college was separated between the two campuses, the Collège de Sherbrooke used a shuttle bus service to transport students and personnel from one campus to the other, costing 0.25$ CAD for a one-way journey. The name of the school team, "Volontaires" (Volunteers), dates from 1972, coming from a catchphrase of a football coach, Michel Bérard: "Are there any volunteers to give a little more effort?" (Y a-t-il est volontaires pour en donner un peu plus?) In 1975, the physical activity center (CAP: Centre de l'activité physique) was opened in the Pavillon 1, becoming at the time the largest of its kind in Estrie and the 3rd largest in Quebec.

The current students' association, the AÉCS (Association étudiante du Cégep de Sherbrooke) was created in 1975, organized by the school's student council. It was the first of its kind in Quebec, created in 1968. The students' council had previously taken part in two student protests in 1968 and 1974. The western campus closed its doors in 1975 and the entirety of operations was moved to the eastern campus. The former Pavillon 1 and 2 were transferred to the École sécondaire du Jolliet, now the École sécondaire du Triolet.

=== 1976 - 2004 ===
On 8 February 1977, a fire broke out in the basement of the student residences of the Collège de Sherbrooke which would cost a total of more than 100,000$ CAD in damages as well taking up to 15 days for the surrounding area to be cleaned.

3 years after winning a trophy for excellence in its 1975 season by the newspaper, La Tribune, The college's hockey team would be disbanded in 1978 due to high costs and a diminishing interest among students. The team would be briefly revived in 1983, lasting for only 2 years. Similarly would happen to the football team, disappearing in 1980 due to the teams inability to train in their stadium, the Amedée Roy Stadium.

The Collège de Granby separated from the Collège de Sherbrooke officially in 1980, eventually becoming itself the Cégep de Granby. The year after, the theater in the Pavillon 3 was renamed to the Salle Alfred-DesRochers, named after Québécois poet, Alfred DesRochers.

Starting from the beginning of the 1980s, a rising resentment for the Ministry of Education grew amongst Cégep students across Quebec. This was due to multiple factors: the implementation of the Projet de règlement des études collégiales (PREC) which aimed at adding history, mathematics and economy courses to the curriculum of all programs, the raise of student loan interest rates by 10.5% as well as the freezing of bursaries in 1982. Decisions made by the Cégep de Sherbrooke's administration such as the relocation of the school cafeteria, the increase in tuition fees and the refusal to fund the AÉCS had led to the student council to vote on a students' strike in 1984. Passing at a 84% support of the 3000 students present at the meeting, students occupied the campus from the day after the vote until 16 April, when the Ministry of Education promised a revision of the PREC.

The Foundation of the Cégep de Sherbrooke was founded in 1990 with the goal of giving student grants and funding student projects. Its first largescale campaign took place in 2003 with the Adhésion à l'Alliance Sport-Études program, aiming to aid student-athletes to conciliate their studies and their sports disciplines.

=== 2005 - Today ===
In 2005, the Collège de Sherbrooke would officially be renamed the Cégep de Sherbrooke, accompanied by a rebranding of its logo and the official imagery of the school.

A high number of new students in the autumn semester of 2008 would force the administration to open a new Pavillon temporarily, the Pavillon 9, also colloquially called 'The Bunker'. It was built in the courtyard between the Pavillon 3, 2 and 6, constructed out of prefabricated modules. It would later be dismantled in 2012. In 2010, the Pavillon 10 was opened, located in a former church of the Congregation of the Blessed Sacrament, dated to 1939.

On February 29, 2012, the AÉCS would adopt, by popular vote, to go on strike indefinitely as part of the 2012 Quebec student protests. Picketing would take place every morning from then on for 9 weeks, after which the student council would vote on a return to classes, despite still refusing the final offers of the Liberal government.

In 2018, the Cégep de Sherbrooke held a year-long celebration of its semicentennial (50th) anniversary, offering many different events, activities and expositions all throughout the year. Among other things, the school held art exhibitions, speeches, firsthand accounts, fundraisers, and sports events. Teachers and students celebrated through other symbolic ways, such as the "50 ans 50 sommets" (50 years 50 summits) initiative that invited students and teachers to take pictures of themselves atop mountain summits across the world.

== Campus ==
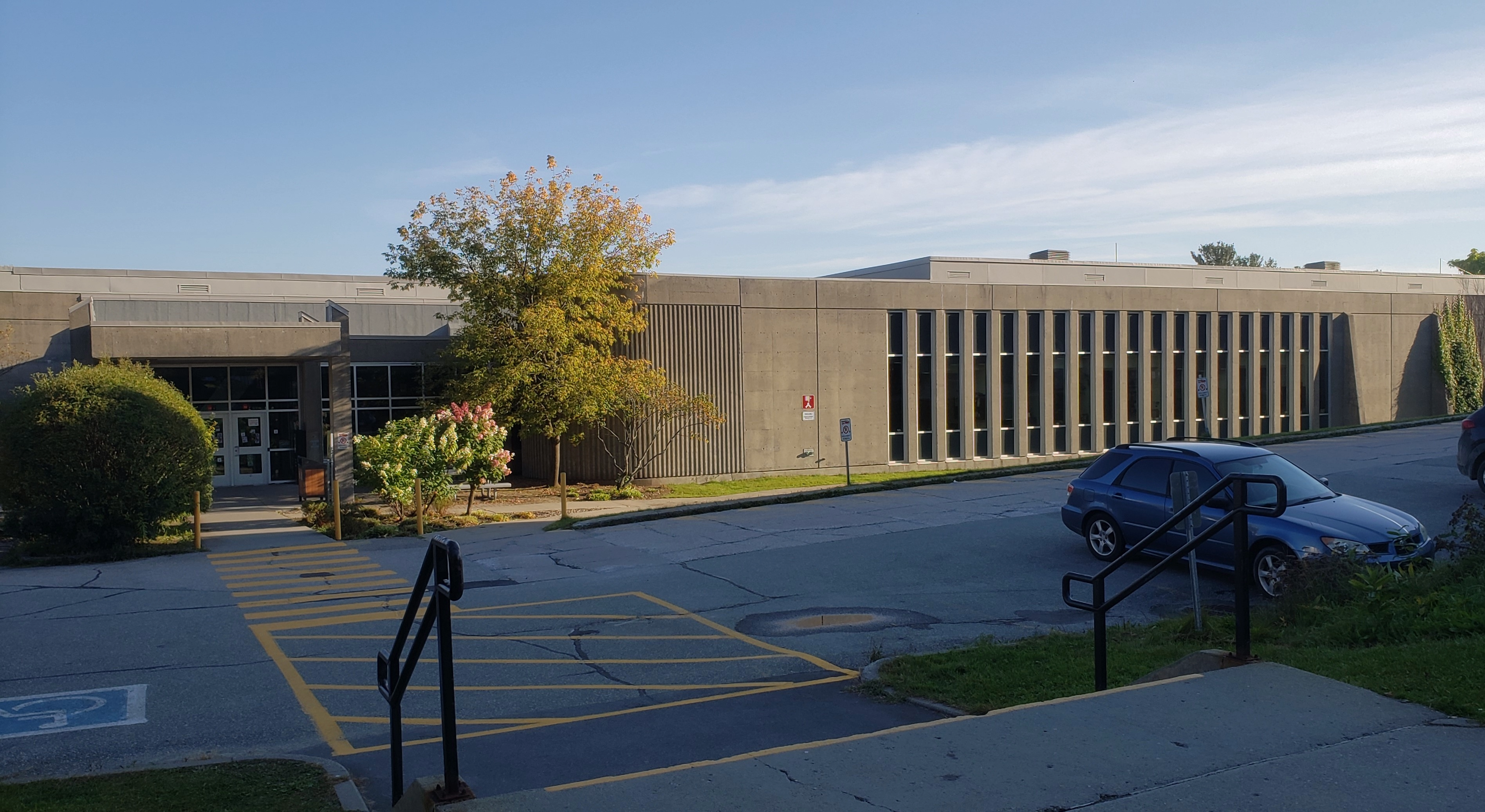
Pavillon 1: The Centre de l'activité physique (CAP).

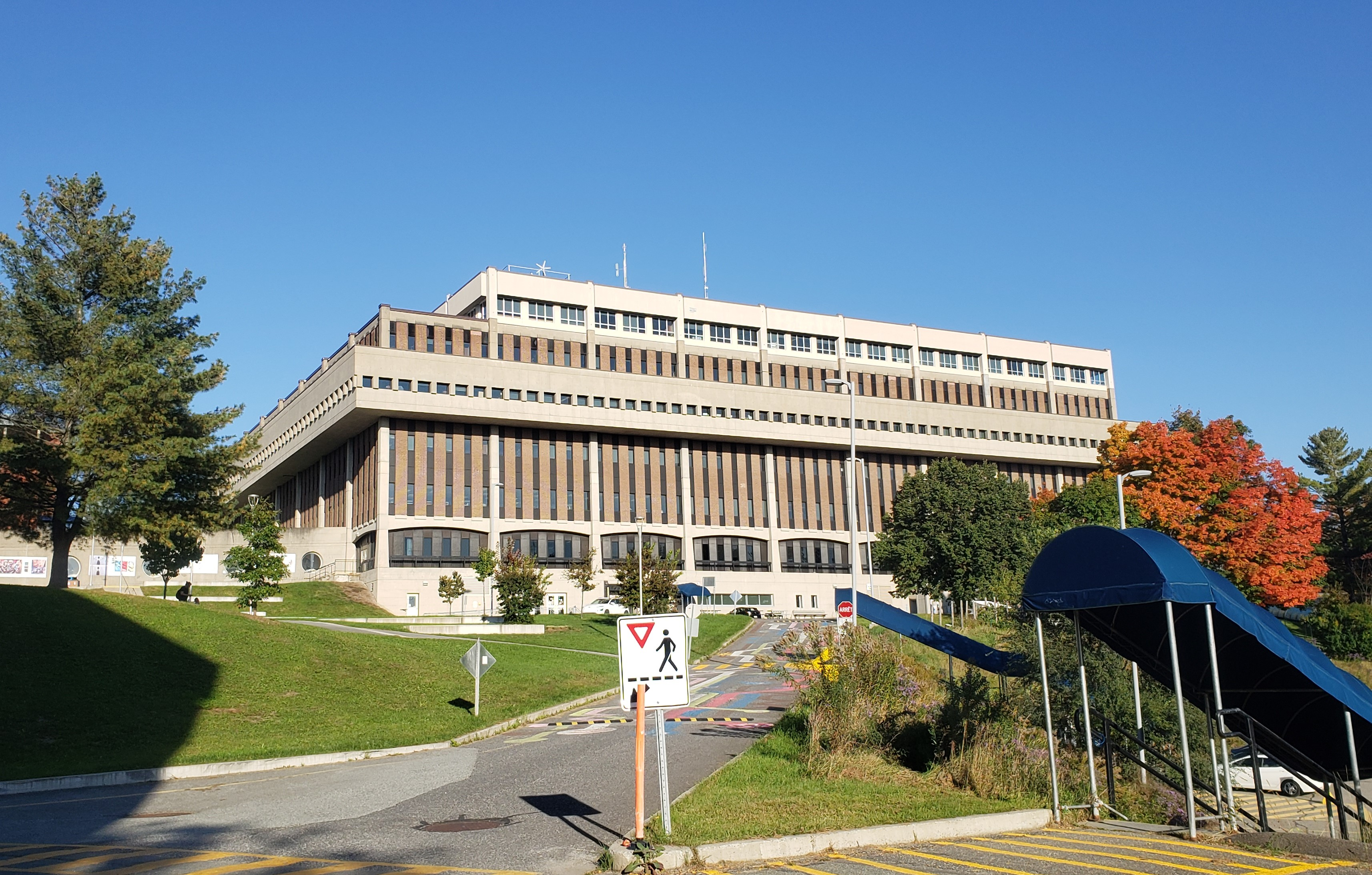
Pavillon 2: Departments of physical, biological and medicinal sciences, school library, and student services.

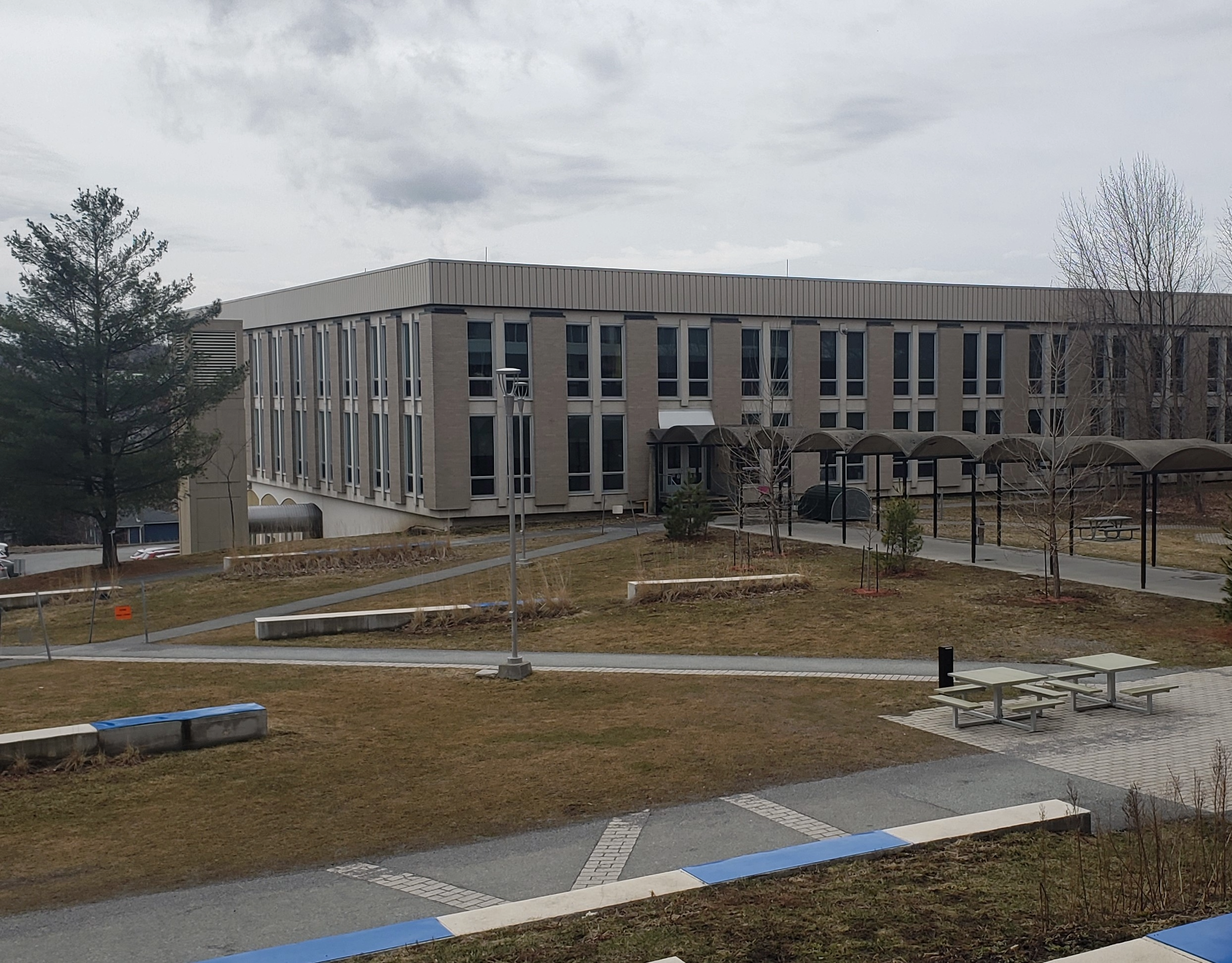
Pavillon 3: Departments of social sciences and music, and the Salle Alfred-Desrochers.

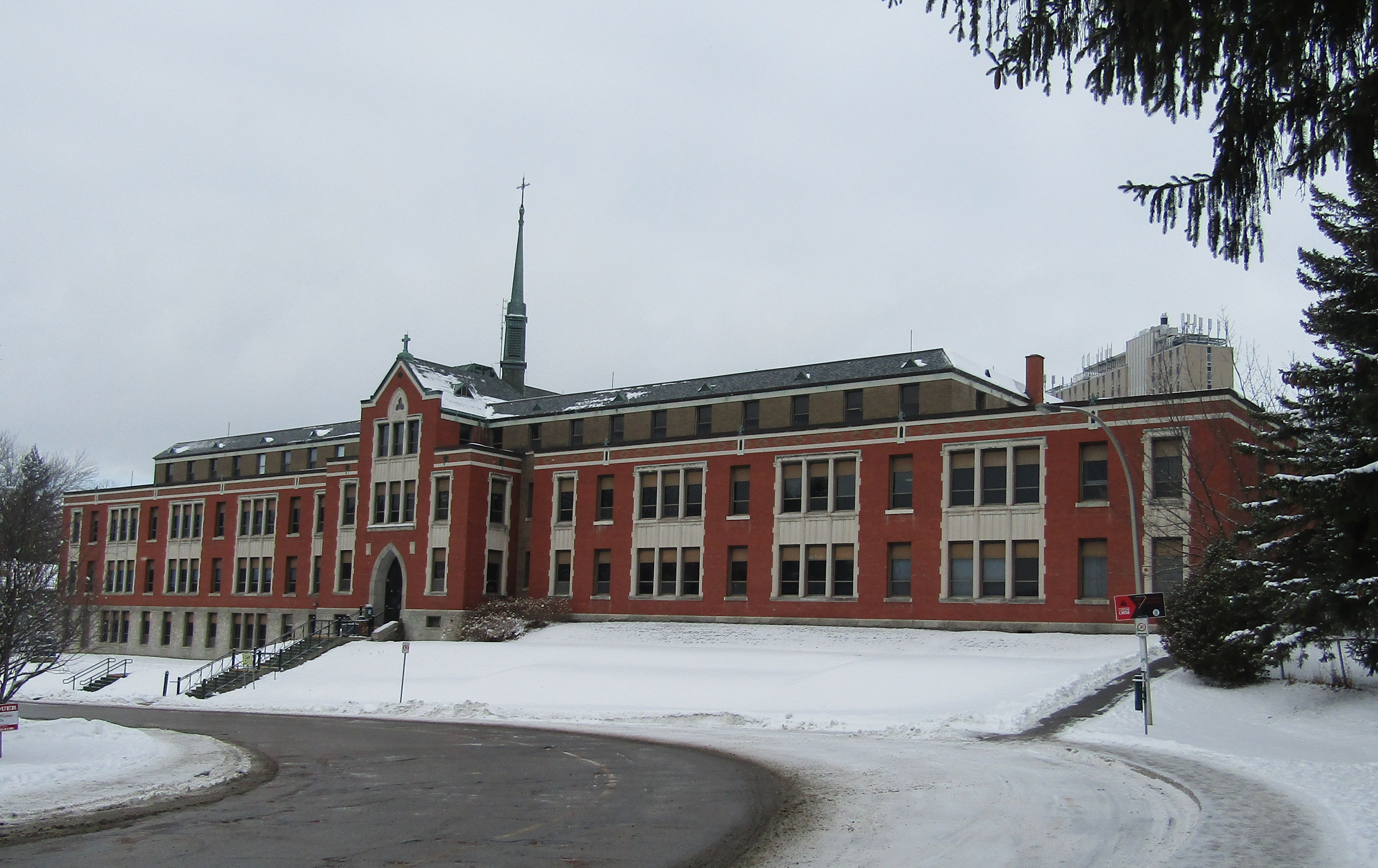
Pavillon 4: Departments of French, English and visual arts.

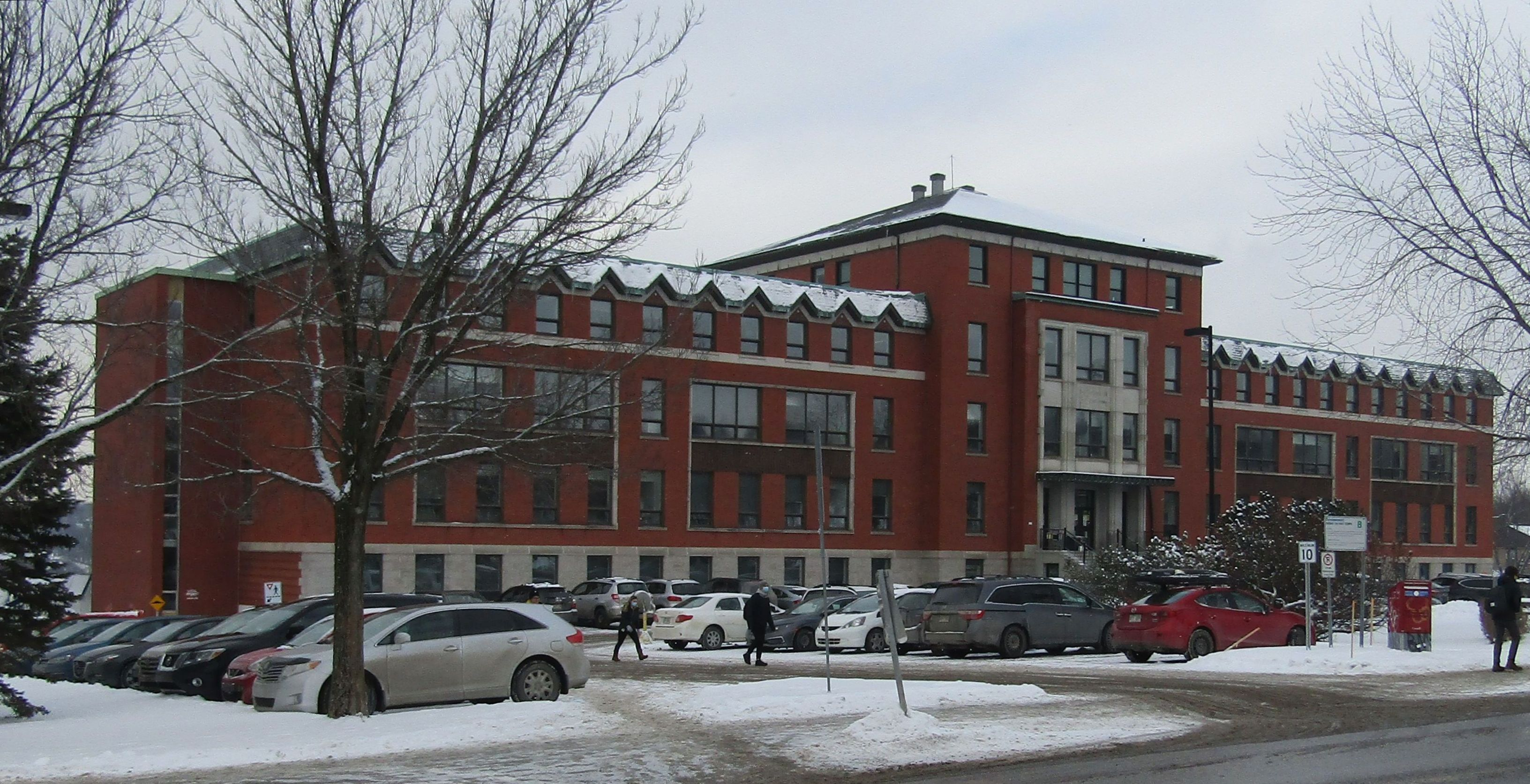
Pavillon 5: School administration.

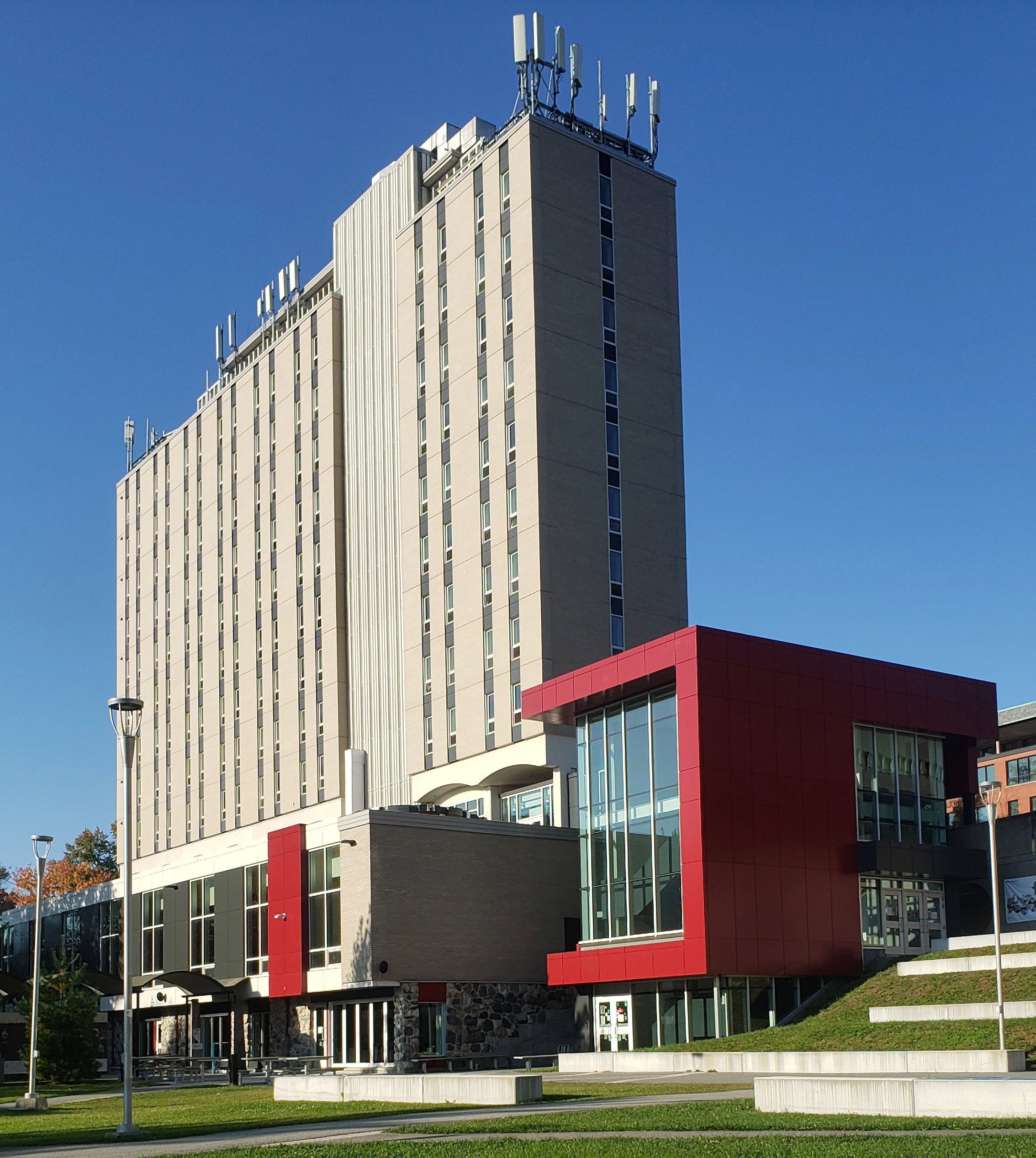
Pavillon 6: Student residences and the cafeteria.

The 10-acre (4.0 ha) campus of the Cégep de Sherbrooke is composed of the first 6 Pavillons, connected by intertwining green space and parking lots. The Pavillon 10, while not on-campus, is located within walking distance to the rest of the campus.

=== Pavillon 1 ===
Besides physical education classes, the Pavillon 1 is mainly dedicated to the school's Centre de l'activité physique (CAP), consisting of 5 gymnasiums, a room for indoor climbing, a 25-meter (82 ft) long swimming pool, and a fitness center. All of the services offered by the CAP, such as renting equipment or places, are accessible to the public with certain tariffs, whereas students have either reduced or no fees. The fitness center requires a subscription for students, employees or members of the public. The Pavillon 1 also contains classrooms for the school's dance program, the Cégep's school clinic and a physiotherapy center.

=== Pavillon 2 ===
The Pavillon 2 is by far the largest building in all of the Cégep, having 7 floors in total. Most classes in the building are held on floors 4, 5, and 6. The fourth floor is dedicated primarily for engineering and industrial maintenance classes. The fifth floor hosts chemistry, physics as well as mathematics classes. The sixth floor is used for biology, nursing, biotechnology and veterinary classes.

Besides classes, the Pavillon 2 has multiple student services, such as pedagogical aid, financial aid, psychotherapy and professional orientation. On the second floor, the Guichet d’information et d’assistance (Information and assistance desk) is open for students to ask questions and seek information about the services offered in the Cégep.

The entirety of the third floor of the Pavillon is dedicated to the school library, known internally as the Centre des médias (Media centre). Students have access to multiple services, such as renting audiovisual equipment, aid in documentary research, assistance in multimedia production and 3D printing. Students can access a collection of around 2,000 physical copies of books and periodicals, more than 100,000 audiovisual and printed documents, as well as a selected catalogue of exterior sources, such as Cairn.info, the Canadian Reference Centre, Érudit, Encyclopaedia Universalis, different video distribution services, like the National Film Board of Canada or Télé-Québec, and several online dictionaries, such as the Petit Robert or the Multidictionnaire.

=== Pavillon 3 ===
The third floor of the Pavillon 3 is where the social science departments are located, consisting of history, geography, economy, psychology, sociology, anthropology, political science as well as other related technical programs, such as social work or early childhood education. The departments of music and philosophy are also located in the building, on the first and third floors respectively. The building also is the location of the Salle Alfred-DesRochers, a theater of 460 seats that hosts occasional events as well as the student assemblies.

=== Other Pavillons ===
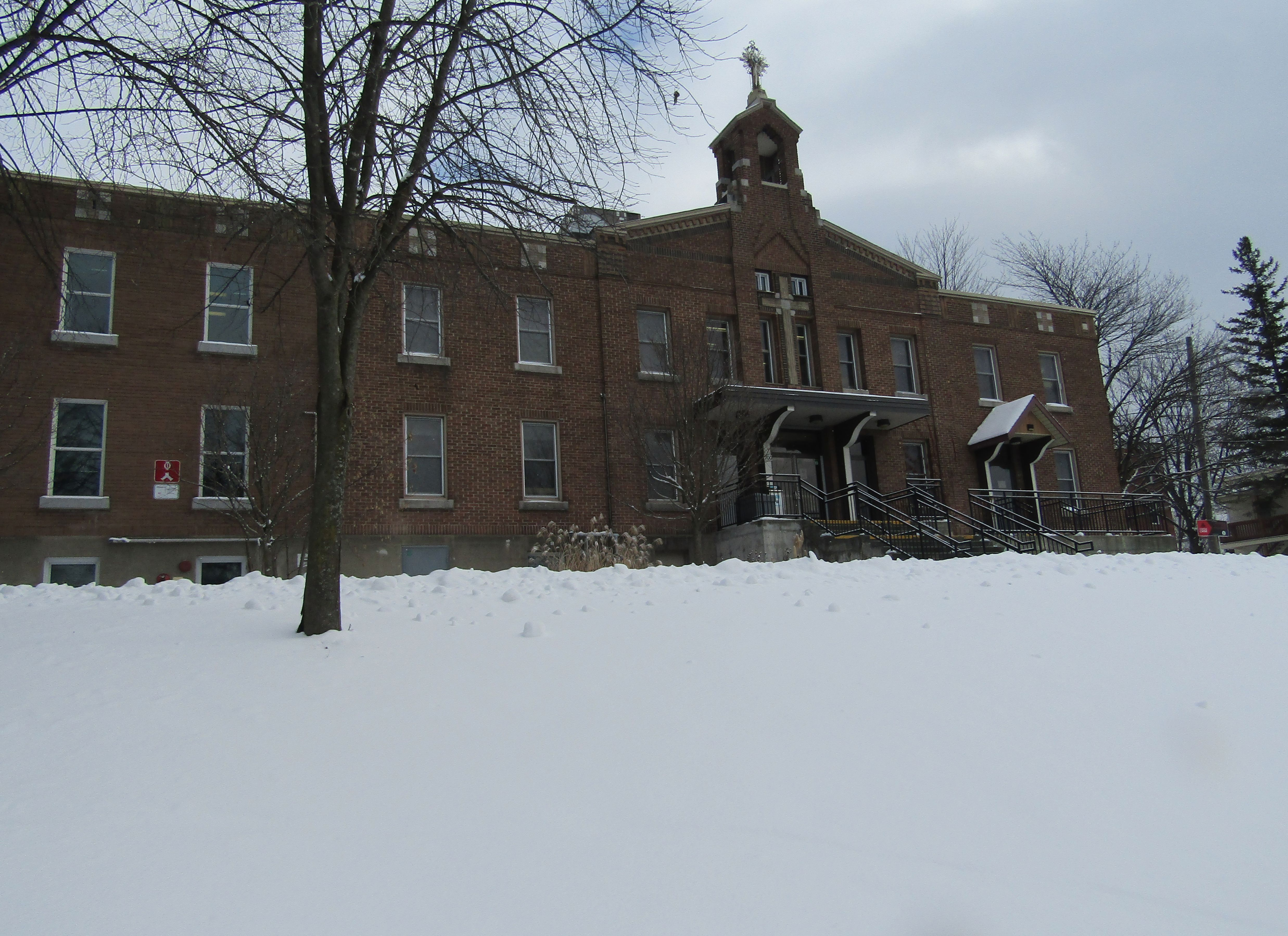
Pavillon 10

The Pavillon 4 contains all of the departments related to language, literary studies and art. These are the departments of English, French, visual arts, graphic design and other language classes.

The Pavillon 5 is the administrative center of the Cégep and is only used class-wise for courses in administration. Besides such, it is the location of some student services: psychosocial aid, international services and a sexual health clinic. It is also the location of the Fondation Cégep de Sherbrooke.

The Pavillon 6 contains student residences from floors 4 to 14. There are only 13 floors in total however since there is no 13th floor. Besides dormitories, it also has the school cafeteria, a school store, the ArtiShow, and the offices of the AÉCS.

The Pavillon 10 is used for classes in the police technical program, a required 3-year training before completing their studies at the École nationale de police du Québec in Nicolet, Quebec. The building is also used for the program of paramedicine.

== Programs ==
Cégeps in Quebec are uniform in the fundamental structure of their programs. Pre-university programs take two years to complete at full-time, whereas technical programs take three. All programs in the Cégep must follow classes in five different domains as part of their curriculum. A student must, once during their collegial studies, follow four French classes, two English classes, three philosophy classes, and three different physical education courses. The fifth obligatory class consists of two complimentary courses, chosen by the student from a list of a multitude of courses from different domains. It is generally prioritized for students to follow courses outside of their field of study, and examples of complimentary classes include: the history of Blues, Jazz and Rock; contemporary dance; the study of beer, wine and other alcoholic beverages; astronomy; or Spanish.

Pre-university programs in the school include social sciences, natural sciences, music and visual arts, among five others. There are additionally two other possibilities of pre-university programs that are available to students: Tremplin DEC and a dual major. The prior is a type of program that only follows the obligatory classes, requiring an eventual adherence to a specific program in order to obtain one's diploma. The dual major takes three years to finish, allowing the student to finish with two separate college diplomas.

There are a total of 24 different technical programs offered by the Cégep, varying between many different fields of work. A few programs are given mostly outside of campus: agricultural management in the CRIFA, and law enforcement and paramedicine in the Pavillon 10, however some general classes are given in one of the main buildings. All technical programs offer or require internships to be completed during parts of their sessions, partnering with many different businesses and organizations in and around Sherbrooke.

== Partnerships ==
The College of General and Vocational Education is affiliated with the ACCC, and CCAA.

== Athletics ==
The college participates in the Canadian Colleges Athletic Association,

== See also ==
- List of colleges in Quebec
- Higher education in Quebec
