= David Sherman (philosopher) =

American philosopher (born 1958)

- Born: 1958 (age 67–68)

Academic background
- Education: University of Texas at Austin (PhD)
- Thesis: The Idea of a Mediating Subjectivity in Sartre and Adorno (2000)
- Doctoral advisor: Robert C. Solomon, Douglas Kellner
- Other advisors: Kathleen Higgins, Kelly Oliver, Louis Mackey, Harry Cleaver

Academic work
- Era: Contemporary philosophy
- Region: Western philosophy
- School or tradition: Continental Philosophy
- Institutions: University of Montana

David Lloyd Sherman (born 1958) is an American professor of philosophy at the University of Montana.

== Life and works ==
A specialist on continental philosophy, Sherman has authored three books on Albert Camus, Jean-Paul Sartre and Theodore Adorno, and Friedrich Hegel. He co-edited The Blackwell Guide to Continental Philosophy with his doctoral advisor Robert C. Solomon.

=== Selected publications ===
==== As author ====
- Sherman, David (October 10, 2008). Camus. Wiley. doi:10.1002/9781444303278. ISBN 978-1-4051-5930-2.
- Sherman, David (2007). Sartre and Adorno: The Dialectics of Subjectivity. State University of New York Press. ISBN 978-0-7914-7116-6.
- Hegel's Phenomenology of Self-Consciousness: Text and Commentary. State University of New York Press. May 27, 1999. ISBN 978-1-4384-1693-9. (1999, translation and commentary).

==== As editor ====
- Solomon, Robert C.; Sherman, David, eds. (2003). The Blackwell Guide to Continental Philosophy (1 ed.). Wiley. doi:10.1002/9780470997093. ISBN 978-0-631-22124-1.
