= AAPT =

AAPT may refer to:

== Companies ==
- AAPT (company), an Australian telecommunications company

== Professional organizations ==
- American Association of Philosophy Teachers
- American Association of Physics Teachers
- ACTTION-APS Pain Taxonomy

== Software ==
- Android Asset Packaging Tool, to handle Android application packages
