= Mexico Link =

The Ulverston Victoria High School Mexico Link is a link between Ulverston Victoria High School (Cumbria, England) and Secundaria Tecnica #44 Francisco Villa (Mexico City). The link was founded in 2001 by the British Council in Mexico City with a theme of Human Rights and Citizenship.

Students and teachers on both sides of the Atlantic meet regularly to discuss the issues affecting their countries. There have been four major exchange visits between Ulverston and Mexico City and Mexico City and Ulverston. There have also been smaller visits involving small groups of teachers and students.

The linking originated in January 2001 when the British Council in Mexico City began to develop an Interactive Citizenship and Human Rights Project. The aim was to link 20 Secondary Technical Schools in Mexico City with 20 secondary schools in UK.

The UVHS Philosophy Club had begun in spring 2001 and it was looking to develop a link with a South American country where P4C (Philosophy for Children) was strong. In September 2001, the UVHS Philosophy Club was invited to join a project initiated by the British Council and it soon began contact with Mexico.

Case studies about the UVHS – Secundaria Tecnica #44 Link have been used in several British Council and DFES documents. This link has also been featured in the local media and in the Times Educational Supplement. Students and teachers involved regularly make presentations and offer workshops.

The linking is now being embedded into curriculum of both schools. This development work forms the heart of the British Council Curriculum Development Award. History, Geography, Belief Philosophy and Ethics, Citizenship and Maths are currently directly involved. The Philosophy for Children technique is used, aiming to provide a democratic community for discussions to take place in.

Communication between the two schools is mainly by email. Students and staff contribute to the link website and to the biannual newsletter "The Link" which is distributed to local supporters.
