= Harry Stottlemeier's Discovery =

Philosophical novel for children

- Author: Matthew Lipman
- Language: English
- Publication date: 1971

Harry Stottlemeier's Discovery is a philosophical novel for children written by Matthew Lipman. The novel was Lipman's first, and inaugurated the educational movement known as Philosophy for Children. It was first published in 1971 and revised in 1974.

The book deals with everyday situations which a group of children encounter. These situations then become the substance for mental engagement and thinking about thinking. Rather than looking for answers, the type of thinking encouraged is about prolonging questioning, and performing self-initiated testing on the events or objects under discussion. There is a focus on how to teach ourselves logic by examining the results of the self-initiated tests. It opens with Harry, the school boy who leads the story, falling asleep in a science class, although "he didn't really fall asleep ... His mind just wandered off". The narrative deals with substantial democratic issues such as "should every child go to school?", and "should every person salute the flag?", along with metaphysical and epistemological issues. Louis Katzner notes that Lipman uses syllogistic rather than propositional logic.

In the early 1970s it entered Montclair Public Schools in New Jersey. Lipman subsequently published an instruction manual to accompany it.

== See also ==
- Philosophy for Children
- Sophie's World
