= Alan Fox =

Alan Fox may refer to:

- Alan Fox (sociologist) (1920–2002), English industrial sociologist
- Alan Fox (footballer) (1936–2021), Welsh professional footballer
- Alan C. Fox (born 1944), author and founder of the Rattle poetry journal
- Alan Fox (philosopher) (born 1955), American philosopher

== See also ==
- Allen Fox (born 1939), former tennis player
