= Shakti Maira =

Indian artist (1947–2021)

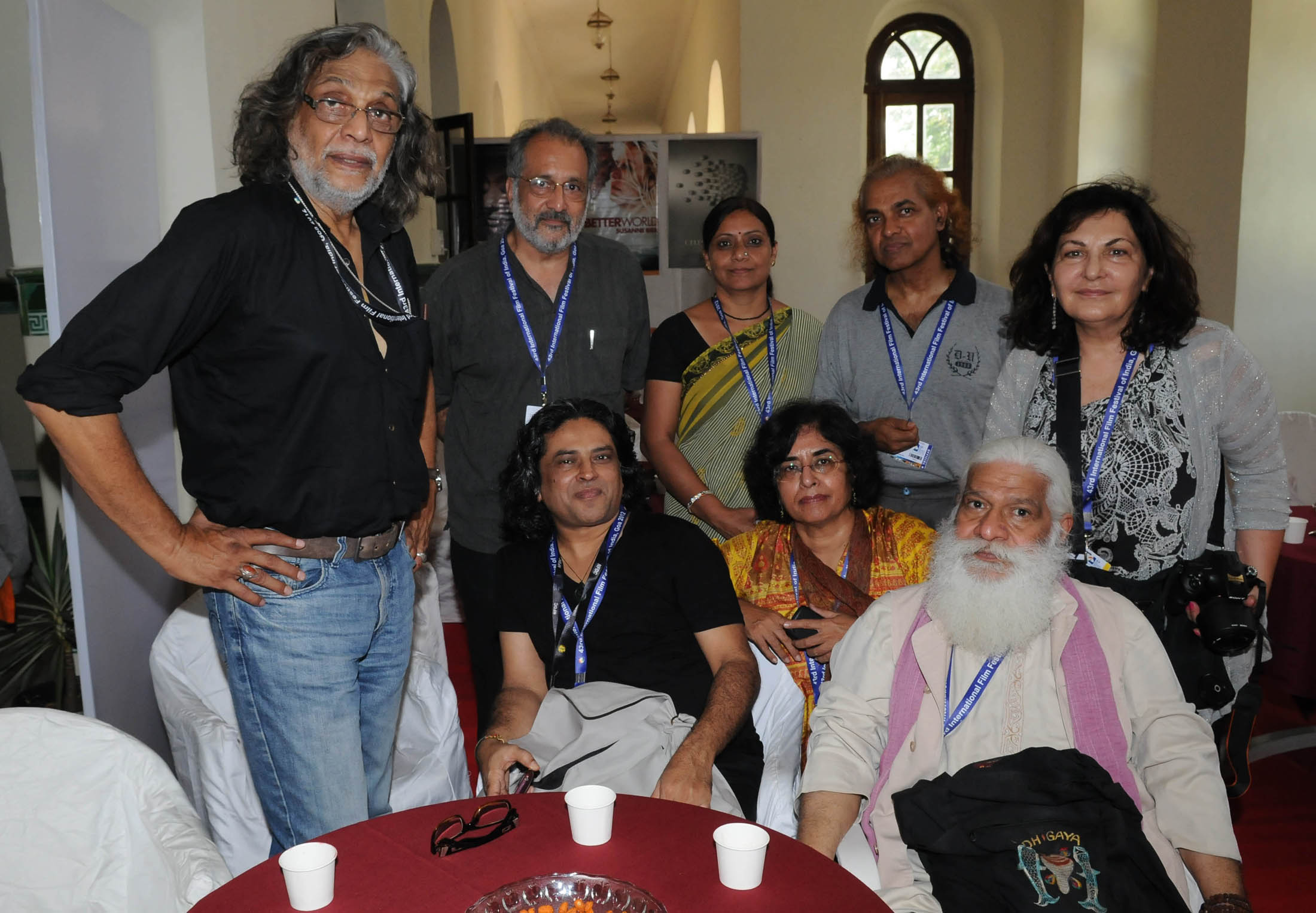
- Maira at IFFI, 2012
- Born: 31 August 1947; Shimla, Himachal Pradesh, India
- Died: 9 May 2021 (aged 73); Delhi, India
- Occupations: Artist, sculptor, printmaker, writer and speaker

Shakti Maira (1947–2021) was an Indian artist, sculptor, printmaker, writer and speaker.

== Early life ==
Maira was born in 1947 in Shimla, Himachal Pradesh. He studied at Mayo College, Ajmer, and was an alumnus of St. Stephen's College, Delhi, and IIM Ahmedabad .

== Art ==
Maira was an artist who worked in many media. His paintings are in oil, acrylic or mixed media on canvas, paper, silk, board, marble, wood and byōbu. His printmaking has encompassed collographs, monotypes, etchings, woodprints and stoneprints. His sculpture and reliefs are in terracotta, stoneware, wood, stone and bronze.

Maira's work is in the National Gallery of Modern Art in New Delhi, India, and in private collections around the world. His art has been exhibited in over forty one-person and group shows around in India, USA, Sri Lanka, France and Netherlands.

== Publications ==
- Towards Ananda: Rethinking Indian Art and Aesthetics. Penguin/Viking. 2006. ISBN 9780670058648.
- Kathleen Higgins; Shakti Maira; Sonia Sikka, eds. (2016). Artistic Visions and the Promise of Beauty. Springer Publishing. ISBN 9783319438917.
- The Promise of Beauty and Why it Matters. HarperCollins India. 2017. ISBN 9789352641673.
