= Ned Markosian =

American philosopher

Academic background
- Education: Oberlin College (BA); University of Massachusetts Amherst (PhD)
- Thesis: Does time pass? (1990)
- Doctoral advisor: Gareth Matthews

Academic work
- Discipline: Philosopher
- Sub-discipline: Metaphysics
- Institutions: University of Massachusetts Amherst

Ned Markosian is an American philosopher. He is currently professor of philosophy at the University of Massachusetts Amherst.

Markosian is of Armenian descent and has four brothers. He received his BA from Oberlin College and his PhD in Philosophy from UMass Amherst in 1990. His doctoral advisor was Gareth Matthews. Markosian has previously taught at Lawrence University, University of New Hampshire, West Virginia University, Bay Path College, University of Hartford, and Western Washington University. He has been at UMass Amherst since Fall 2015.

Markosian's work is primarily on metaphysics, namely philosophy of time, metaphysics of physical/material objects, freedom and determinism, and personal identity. He was also written on ethics, epistemology, decision theory, philosophy of language, philosophy of science, philosophy of religion, and history of philosophy.

Markosian has delivered lectures in over a dozen countries. He has visited Armenia on several occasions. In 2013 he delivered lectures at the Yerevan State University. In 2017 he co-founded of the Yerevan Academy for Linguistics and Philosophy (YALP), an annual intensive summer school of analytic philosophy and theoretical linguistics hosted by the American University of Armenia. He began it with Daniel Altshuler, Susanna Melkonian-Altshuler and Arshak Balayan.

== Views ==
According to his profile on PhilPapers, Markosian is an empiricist and atheist.

In 2019 Markosian was among the panelists at an American Philosophical Association meeting on how to diversify philosophy departments.

In 2019 Markosian, along with dozens of other philosophers, signed a list of proposals for what individual philosophers and departments can do to prevent harassment and support victims of sexual harassment in academia.

Markosian is most famous for his defence of presentism, the view that only present objects exist. He has also defended endurantism through his argument of sideways music. He has co-written the Stanford Encyclopedia of Philosophy entry on the philosophy of time.

== Publications ==
Books

- Carroll, John W. and Ned Markosian. An Introduction to Metaphysics. Cambridge University Press, 2010.

Articles

- Markosian, Ned. “On Language and the Passage of Time.” Philosophical Studies, vol. 66, no. 1, 1992, pp. 1–26.
- Markosian, Ned. "How fast does time pass?." Philosophy and Phenomenological Research 53, no. 4 (1993): 829–844.
- Markosian, Ned. "Brutal composition." Philosophical Studies 92, no. 3 (1998): 211–249.
- Markosian, Ned. "What are physical objects?." Philosophy and Phenomenological Research 61, no. 2 (2000): 375–395.
- Markosian, Ned. "A defense of presentism." Oxford Studies in Metaphysics 1, no. 3 (2004): 47–82.
- Markosian, Ned (January 24, 2014). "Time". Stanford Encyclopedia of Philosophy. Archived from the original on 30 November 2019.
