= Anthony Weston =

American logician

- Anthony Weston in class, Spring 2012.
- Born: 1954 (age 71–72); Spring Green, Wisconsin, U.S.

Philosophical work
- Era: 20th-/21st-century philosophy
- Region: Western philosophy
- School: Pragmatism
- Main interests: Environmentalism; Cultural philosophy Critical thinking Creativity; Ethics
- Notable ideas: Possibilism, Enabling Environmental Practice, self-validating reduction, Teaching as Staging, Impresario with a Scenario

Anthony Weston is an American writer, teacher, and philosopher.

== Life ==
Weston was born in 1954 and grew up in the Sauk County region of southwestern Wisconsin, country identified with the conservationist Aldo Leopold (in his Sand County Almanac) and the architect and visionary Frank Lloyd Wright, a strong influence on his father's family. He is a 1976 summa cum laude graduate of Macalester College, and received his PhD in philosophy in 1982 from the University of Michigan, where he wrote his PhD dissertation with Frithjof Bergmann on "The Subjectivity of Values". He taught at the State University of New York at Stony Brook for ten years, and subsequently at Elon University, where he was recognized for both teaching and scholarly work, as well as abroad in Costa Rica, Western Australia, and British Columbia.

Weston has experience in interdisciplinary themes, pedagogy, and other fields of study. He has co-taught with biologists and ecologists in both Philosophy and environmental studies at Elon, working as well with astronomers, Zen masters and in environmental education programs as well as on design and social change projects such as Common Ground Ecovillage. Weston retired from full-time teaching in 2018.

== Philosophical work ==
Weston's philosophical project as a whole advances an expansive "toolbox" for critical, creative, and constructive thinking, especially for purposes of social and environmental re-imagination and pragmatic ethical practice. He argues that social, ethical, and ontological problems that we so often take as "given" are more often than not, products of underlying conditions, practices, and choices. This view may be identified with deconstruction. However, Weston argues:

"...the genuine promise of this critical move is betrayed by the thinnest of follow-ups. We need to give the same kind of attention to the re-construction of genuinely better alternatives in the new space of freedom that broadly deconstructive moves create." ("A 21st Century Philosophical Toolbox", Keynote address for the Atlantic Region Philosophers Association Conference, 10/16/09)

This line of thinking, which was inspired in particular by the pragmatic social philosophy of John Dewey, believed by Weston to encourage open-ended, generative, imaginative, and experimental thinking, is modeled on crafts such as building or performance. It also encourages the displacement of category-bound and formal thinking that tends to be more reactive and critical by empirical science. A key concept of his theory is the idea that while the majority of concepts and objects have much more depth than may appear, thematizing and self-validating reduction limits the ability to realize this depth. Correspondingly, he argues, people should not "read off" the nature and possibility of things off the world as it is "given", but instead actively engage with the world, to create new kinds of openings in interaction with the world within which deeper possibilities might emerge.

He also argues that these issues appear in the "originary" areas of ethics, as Weston calls them. He believes that they are only just beginning to become developed fields. He argues that as such, they can not be "solved" by only the extension or application of pre-given principles, instead requiring the co-creation or co-constitution of new values. In environmental ethics in particular, Weston argues that it is still a highly theoretical field. He also supports the idea of a multicentric approach to reconstituting the human relation to the more-than-human world, as opposed to an anthropocentric view or a views "centered" in the sense that one dimension and model for values determines who or what morally counts and why.

Another important philosophical belief of Weston's relates to the connection of the built and lived world and thought. Philosophers tend to assume a one-way connection—that thought determines world—while philosophy's critics, such as doctrinaire Marxists, see it just the other way around. In Weston's view, they both influence each other. He claims that the world or a set of concrete practices represent the enactment of certain ideas, but they also shape our ideas in turn. For example, the cultural enactment and perpetuation of anthropocentrism. He believes that, assuming his theory is correct, the dialectical nature of it gives thought an anchor, allows people to work out ideas concretely, and allows for philosophical change:

The world shapes our concepts but does not determine them; likewise our concepts shape our thought but do not determine it. The upshot is conceptual room to move. Rather than analyzing concepts as if they were fixed read-offs of reality, we can reshape and relocate them, and by so doing remake thought and the world itself. ("A 21st Century Philosophical Toolbox")

== Bibliography ==
=== Books ===
==== General philosophy ====
- Philosophy's Big Chance: Re-Imagining the Possibilities of a World on Edge, 2026.

==== Critical and constructive thinking ====
- A Rulebook for Arguments (Hackett Publishing Company, 1986; 6th edition, 2026, ISBN 0-87220-954-7)
- A Workbook for Arguments, co-authored with David Morrow (Hackett Publishing Company, 2011, ISBN 1-60384-549-6). Fourth edition 2027.
- Creativity for Critical Thinkers (Oxford University Press, 2007; ISBN 0-19-530621-X)
- Thinking Through Questions, co-authored with Stephen Bloch-Schulman (Hackett Publishing Company, 2020).

==== Pedagogy ====
- Teaching as the Art of Staging: A Scenario-Based College Pedagogy in Action (Stylus Publishing, 2018 ISBN 1-62036-520-0

==== Ethics ====
- Toward Better Problems (Temple University Press, 1992, ISBN 0-87722-948-1).
- A Practical Companion To Ethics (Oxford University Press, 1997; 5th edition, 2020 ISBN 0-19-973058-X).
- A 21st Century Ethical Toolbox (Oxford University Press, 2001; 5th edition, with Professor Bob Fischer, 2023; ISBN 9780190621155).
- Creative Problem-Solving in Ethics (Oxford University Press, 2007; ISBN 0-19-530620-1)

==== Environmentalism ====
- Back to Earth: Tomorrow's Environmentalism (Temple University Press, 1994, ISBN 1-56639-237-3).
- An Invitation to Environmental Philosophy (Oxford University Press, 1999, ISBN 0-19-512204-6)
- The Incompleat Eco-Philosopher: Essays on the Edges of Environmental Ethics (State University of New York Press, 2009, ISBN 0-7914-7669-3).
- Mobilizing the Green Imagination: An Exuberant Manifesto (New Society Publishers, 2012, ISBN 0-86571-709-5).

==== Social philosophy ====
- Jobs for Philosophers (Xlibris, 2003; ISBN 1-4134-4009-6)
- How to Re-Imagine the World: A Pocket Handbook for Practical Visionaries (New Society Publishers, 2007; ISBN 0-86571-594-7)

=== Selected essays ===
Weston has written over fifty essays and reviews in the above fields as well as others such as philosophy of education and the philosophy of space exploration. Some of the more often-reprinted of these include (original appearances only):

- "Beyond Intrinsic Value: Pragmatism in Environmental Ethics", Environmental Ethics 7:4 (1985): 321–339.
- "Forms of Gaian Ethics", Environmental Ethics 9:3 (1987): 121–134.
- "Radio Astronomy as Epistemology: Some Philosophical Reflections on the Search for Extraterrestrial Intelligence", Monist 71:1 (1988): 88–100.
- "Uncovering the 'Hidden Curriculum': A Laboratory Course in Philosophy of Education", APA Newsletter on Teaching Philosophy 90:2 (Winter 1991): 36–40.
- "Non-anthropocentrism in a Thoroughly Anthropocentrized World", The Trumpeter 8:3 (1991): 108–112.
- "Before Environmental Ethics", Environmental Ethics 14 (1992): 323–340
- "Self-Validating Reduction: Toward a Theory of the Devaluation of Nature", Environmental Ethics 18 (1996): 115–132.
- "Instead of Environmental Education", in Bob Jickling, ed., Proceedings of the Yukon College Symposium on Ethics, Environment, and Education (Whitehorse, Y.T.: Yukon College, 1996).
- "Risking Philosophy of Education", Metaphilosophy 29 (1998): 145–158.
- "Environmental Ethics as Environmental Etiquette: Toward an Ethics-Based Epistemology in Environmental Philosophy" (with Jim Cheney), Environmental Ethics 21 (1999): 115–134.
- "Multi-Centrism: A Manifesto", Environmental Ethics 26 (2004): 25–40.
- "For a Meta-Ethics as Good as Our Practice", in Elizabeth Burge, editor, "Negotiating Dilemmas of Practice: Applied Ethics in Adult Education", special issue of New Directions in Adult and Continuing Education (Jossey-Bass, 2009).
- "From Guide on the Side to Impresario with a Scenario", College Teaching 63:3 (2015)

== Criticism ==
Critics argue that Weston's notions of "originary ethics" and "reconstructive engagement" offer little or no practical application, especially in less-than-optimal situations in which choices nonetheless must be made. Though Weston has challenged what he has called "dilemma-ism" as a method of doing ethics or as an expectation about the necessary structure of ethical problems, genuine dilemmas that need to be addressed do exist. Some critics hold that Weston's vision of opening up new possibilities would open up a range of problematic and disturbing possibilities as well.

Weston's ethics textbooks in particular take substantive positions in ethical philosophy. Weston's rationale is that any practical textbook necessarily does so, and that this is just less noticeable or objectionable to traditionalists in the usual textbooks because the substance tends to be the taken-for-granted norms.

== See also ==
- Self-validating reduction
- List of American philosophers
- List of environmental philosophers
