= Philosophy for Children =

Movement to teach reasoning and argumentative skills to children

Philosophy for Children, sometimes abbreviated to P4C, is a movement that aims to teach reasoning and argumentative skills to children. There are also related methods sometimes called "Philosophy for Young People" or "Philosophy for Kids". Often, the hope is that this will be a key influential move towards a more democratic form of democracy. However, there is also a long tradition within higher education of developing alternative methods for teaching philosophy both in schools and colleges.

Although the noted developmental psychologist Jean Piaget was of the impression that children were not capable of critical thinking until age 11 or 12, the experience of many philosophers and teachers with young children gives reason to believe that children benefit from philosophical inquiry even in early primary school. Furthermore, there is empirical evidence that teaching children reasoning skills early in life greatly improves other cognitive and academic skills and greatly assists learning in general.

== Method and practice of philosophy for children ==
The pedagogy of philosophy for children is diverse. However, many practitioners, including those working in the tradition of Matthew Lipman and the Institute for the Advancement of Philosophy for Children, emphasize the use of a community of inquiry method, which has roots in the work of philosopher John Dewey. The term "inquiry" is preferred to "lesson" because the emphasis is on the group inquiring together into questions with the teacher as a facilitator rather than the authoritative source of information.

=== Questions and pictures as stimuli for conversation ===
As a basis for discussing philosophy with children, the questions used (such as "What is friendship?", "Do animals have feelings?", and "What is happiness?") are of crucial importance. The German educational scientist Michael Siegmund recommends asking children a philosophical question along with an inspiring picture. Together, the image and question create an opening for discussing philosophy. Among other things, natural landscapes, pictures of animals and people, certain social situations, or even fantasy pictures can be used. This dual method can be used as early as daycare for children ages 4 and up, as well as at school or with family.

=== Stories as stimuli for conversation ===
Along with pictures, stories can also lead to discussions of philosophy with children. A story can thus be an occasion to start a philosophical conversation with children. Adults can ask children philosophical questions while reading aloud as well. Stories, combined with profound questions, can inspire children and promote their creativity and imagination. Adults can either add "philosophical questions" to "classic" stories and fairy tales, or use special children's books for discussing philosophy with children. Michael Siegmund recommends stories in which animals are the main characters and child-friendly questions are asked. Possible topics may include poverty and wealth, friendship and family, happiness, freedom, environmental pollution, justice, and more.

=== Diversity in the United Kingdom ===
There is particular diversity in the UK, owing to the large number of competing and collaborating freelance trainers, each emphasizing different strands of the pedagogy. Roger Sutcliffe's practice includes the use of news stories; Steve Williams has emphasised the importance of dialogues that model argument as well as raising philosophical issues; Will Ord emphasises the use of striking photos, often containing contrasts that suggest opposing concepts; Jason Buckley advocates a more physical, game-based approach and "Philosophy in Role", in which children philosophize within a story as characters confronted with a variety of problems.

SAPERE is the UK's leading provider of P4C training. Registered in 1994, the charity has trained over 27,000 teachers and other individuals in the use of P4C. SAPERE's mission is to advance the educational, personal, and social development of young people, especially those facing disadvantage, by promoting P4C. The organization's work gained national prominence in 2015 when Durham University School of Education published results of a randomized control trial of P4C with over 3,000 primary school students. The study was sponsored by the Education Endowment Foundation. The limited study found that P4C advanced attainment for all students and had a powerful impact on children from disadvantaged backgrounds. A larger, later study showed little attainment advancement in the classroom context.

Co-founded by Peter Worley and Emma Worley, The Philosophy Foundation's specialist philosophy teachers (all philosophy graduates) specifically use philosophical material, including thought-experiments and stories or activities that lead to questions from the philosophical canon. They make use of carefully structured questioning strategies and also the introduction of thinking skills in order to develop good thinking habits from a young age. The questioning strategies are used to introduce dialectic along Platonic lines and to maintain philosophical focus. Uniquely, they have a methodology that introduces writing and meta-analysis with older primary and secondary students. (Note: For more on the Philosophy Foundation's methodology see The If Machine: Philosophical Enquiry in the Classroom by Peter Worley.)

UK-based Thinking Space is philosopher Grace Robinson and a network of associated philosophers and educators whose work is characterised by playful and experimental collaborations. This work with a range of practitioners, among them artists, scientists, and academics, aims to bring philosophical issues alive for children and young people. Thinking Space's most notable collaboration is with the University of Leeds on "Leeds Philosophy Exchange", an accredited undergraduate course in which philosophy students facilitate philosophical inquiry in local primary schools, alongside teachers trained by Thinking Space in P4C.

=== West-coast United States ===
A particular way of doing philosophy with children is illustrated by the work of Chris Phillips with the Philosophers Club at Cesar Chavez Elementary School in the Mission District, San Francisco, California.

Professor William Barry of Notre Dame de Namur University is pioneering a new approach to P4C called Philosophy for Children and Community (P4C^{2}) in the San Francisco Bay Area. His contribution to evolving the idea of P4C involves young people becoming novice critical theory action researchers and meaningful members of communities of inquiry focused on human flourishing for every person. Another key component of Barry's P4C^{2} is the importance of children gaining ontological weight from participation in their communities of inquiry by understanding the meaning of quality in praxis in a transformational way through TQ Theory. The Institute of P4C^{2} has recently been developed by Living Leadership Today, LLC, founder Maria Rachelle in Silicon Valley, California, and resulted in the creation of the online international scholarly journal, the International Journal of Transformative Research.

== Leading contributors ==
One of the salient differences between proponents of philosophy for children is in their choice of stimuli—starting points for discussions.

- Matthew Lipman, called "the most influential figure" in helping young students develop philosophical thinking by Gareth Matthews, is credited with starting the Philosophy for Children movement in the 1970s. After witnessing political upheaval taking place on University campuses nationwide in the 1960s, Lipman realized that philosophical and critical thinking should be encouraged much earlier in the academic setting. He founded the Institute for the Advancement of Philosophy for Children (IAPC) at Montclair State University (then Montclair State College) in 1974. Lipman's method involves reading philosophically stimulating narratives to children and encouraging them to come up with philosophical questions in response. The questions set the agenda for a collaborative inquiry where the teacher acts as both facilitator and co-inquirer. The lessons are dialogue-based, with students usually sitting in a circle and taking turns at suggesting solutions, expressing opinions, putting forth arguments and counter arguments, providing examples, constructing criteria, and building on each other's ideas with the aim of coming to a settlement regarding the initial philosophical questions that stimulated the dialogue. Lipman's ideas about learning, pedagogy and curriculum are heavily influenced by the educational and philosophical ideas of the American pragmatist philosopher John Dewey. Many of the materials used by the IAPC are philosophical children's novels that were published by Lipman, including Harry Stottlemeier's Discovery, which he published in 1969. Others have built on Lipman's ideas and developed further teaching resources and learning activities that complement his original Philosophy for Children novels and pedagogical approach, such as Phil Cam's popular teaching resources. Lipman wrote the world's first systematic pre-college philosophy curriculum and created both master's and doctoral programs in the field of Philosophy for Children. He also founded Thinking: The Journal of Philosophy for Children.
- Gareth Matthews worked with a variety of students, but primarily with students in late primary school (5th grade and thereabouts). Matthews's method was to get the students to actively create philosophical settings, to "make the philosophical problem their own". One of his best-known techniques was to provide the beginning of a philosophically provocative story. He then recorded/transcribes student comments, put them in the mouths of characters in the story, and brought the story continuation to the next class session for further discussion. Such interactions are compiled in his book Dialogues With Children.
- Karin Murris of Witwatersrand University, South Africa, and Joanna Haynes of Plymouth University, England, have popularised the use of children's picture books as an alternative to purpose-written materials.
- Tom Wartenberg of Mount Holyoke, Massachusetts, has also written a large number of discussion plans for philosophizing with picture books.
- Jana Mohr Lone has written about children's philosophical thinking and the benefits of encouraging children to engage in philosophical inquiry.
- Ellen Duthie, together with her team based in Spain, researches and develops the possibilities of Visual Philosophy for Children (and adults), exploring different ways of engaging and stimulating philosophical dialogue through visuals in her Wonder Ponder series of books.

== P4C organisations ==
=== International organisations ===
==== IAPC ====
The Institute for the Advancement of Philosophy for Children (IAPC), which has been recognized by the American Philosophical Association for excellence and innovation, utilizes Lipman's method, exposing children to philosophically stimulating narrative to encourage them to create and ask their own philosophical questions, actively in the K–12 classroom through a longstanding partnership with the Montclair public school system. Students are encouraged to ask their questions, and the philosophical facilitator (a member of the IAPC) helps the children to develop philosophical skills and dispositions of critical, caring, and creative thinking to get the young students to come to reasonable judgment about what is "best to do or believe," in response to the initial question. IAPC has a large teacher preparation component and provides teacher manuals that include discussion plans specifically designed to assist in the facilitation of philosophical discussions that are general enough to answer most student questions. In addition to working directly with schoolchildren, members of the IAPC work with several constituencies, including professional and pre-professional educators, educational administrators and policy-makers, and faculty and students of education, philosophy and related disciplines. IAPC has trained educators worldwide to successfully implement their curriculum in their home states and countries. Philosophy and Children organization offers introductory workshops and certificate courses in schools and for graduate teachers in Australia.

=== Regional organisations ===
==== Asia-Pacific ====
===== Federation of Asia-Pacific Philosophy in Schools Associations =====
In the Asia-Pacific, an extensive P4C network has developed since the 1980s. Teacher associations have been established in each Australian state, across New Zealand and in Hong Kong and Singapore for some decades. These teacher associations came together to form the Federation of Asia-Pacific Philosophy in Schools Associations (FAPSA) in the 1990s, which is the peak body for philosophy and P4C teachers in the Asia-Pacific region. FAPSA develop the standards and courses for teachers to teach philosophy in the classroom across their regions. Through professional development and advocacy initiatives, FAPSA seeks to enrich and expand philosophy education in primary and secondary schools across the Asia-Pacific. FAPSA is a member organization of the International Council of Philosophy with Children (ICPIC), whose principles and values guide its work. FAPSA has been instrumental in promoting P4C throughout the region through dialogue, opportunities for training and ongoing projects. The Federation also undertakes non-competitive P4C events for schools in the form of Community of Inquiry days and Philosophy in Public Spaces.

FAPSA has an international, academically peer-reviewed open access journal, the Journal for Philosophy in Schools, which focuses on research into philosophy with school-aged children. This journal was the successor to the Federation's previous publication, the Journal of Critical and Creative Thinking and was established by the current editors, Laura D'Olimpio and Andrew Peterson.

====== FAPSA regional associations ======
FAPSA has associates across the Asia-Pacific region and invites representatives from regions without affiliates to contribute to their governance.

- Society for Philosophy for the Young (Sophy) – Australian Capital Territory
- Hong Kong Uni Graduates Association Education Foundation – Hong Kong
- Philosophy in Schools Association of NSW (PiNS) – New South Wales
- P4C New Zealand (P4CNZ) – New Zealand
- Association for Philosophy in Learning – Singapore
- South Australian Association for Philosophy in Education – South Australia
- Victorian Association for Philosophy for Schools – Victoria

===== PCYNAP =====
- The Philosophy with Children and Youth Network for Asia and the Pacific

===== APIS =====
- Association for Philosophy in Schools in Western Australia

==== Europe ====
The growth of a community engaging European philosophy with children practitioners culminated in the establishment of Stichting SOPHIA — The European Foundation for the Advancement of Doing Philosophy with Children - in 1993, with Eulalia Bosch (Catalonia) serving as president, and Karel van der Leeuw (the Netherlands) as secretary. Adopting the motto of the European Community (now the EU), "unity through diversity", SOPHIA supported the development of doing philosophy with children within all the different European cultures and languages, and nurtured the community among practitioners as the foundation for collaborative work and mutual development. Many groundbreaking and innovative projects have resulted from SOPHIA members working together, often funded by the EU. For example, European philosophy with children projects work with art, citizenship, excluded children, architecture, anti-racism, music, community development, and more.

==== UK ====
- Thoughtful (formerly SAPERE) is a UK charity that trains teachers in P4C nationwide.
- Thinking Space, a UK company founded in 2008, that offers training in philosophy, and works with schools to devise creative philosophy projects that combine the expertise of philosophers and teachers.
- Educational charity The Philosophy Foundation (formerly The Philosophy Shop) trains philosophy graduates to do philosophy with primary and secondary school children and places them in schools nationwide. They also train teachers in the transferable skills of philosophy (questioning, thinking skills, and discourse skills), and are encouraging an inquiry-based approach to education at all levels, including tertiary.

==== North America ====
- The Philosophy Learning and Teaching Organization (PLATO) is a national organization in the USA that provides support and resources for bringing philosophy into pre-college classrooms.
- The North American Association for the Community of Inquiry (NAACI)

==== South America ====
- The Centro Latinamericano de Filosfía para Niños (CELAFIN)

=== Regional college programmes ===
==== UK ====
In the UK the University of Leeds now offers a students into schools programme called Leeds Philosophy Exchange, led by Grace Robinson. The University of Bristol is now working on Bristol Philosophy Exchange applying a similar model in which philosophy students and primary school teachers exchange skills and knowledge in weekly philosophical inquiry with children.

==== US ====
There are a number of college-level academic philosophy programs in the United States that do outreach to public schools, most notably at the University of Washington, University of Massachusetts – Boston, University of Chicago, California State University Long Beach, Texas A&M University, Mount Holyoke College, Montclair State University, Michigan State University, University of Hawaiʻi at Mānoa, Notre Dame de Namur University, Creighton University, and Plattsburgh State University Of New York.

At the University of Washington, the Center for Philosophy for Children educates UW graduate and undergraduate students about how to facilitate philosophy sessions, and then sends them into Seattle classrooms with supervision and mentoring from experienced instructors. This program has introduced philosophy to thousands of public school students and runs many year-long weekly philosophy sessions in Seattle public school classrooms. The center has four graduate fellowships in pre-college philosophy and also runs regular workshops and programs for teachers, parents, and other adults on how to introduce philosophy to young people.

At the University of Chicago, students in the college teach in schools on Chicago's South Side through the University's Civic Knowledge Project. The class, known as Winning Words, is an after-school program that works with elementary, middle, and high school students in Chicago. The program aims to engage and inspire local youth through an education in philosophy, reasoning, and the verbal arts of dialogue and rhetoric; building self-confidence and exposing its students to a wide range of philosophical material. Recognized by the American Philosophical Association, the program provides an introduction to philosophy and Socratic dialogue and includes writing, public speaking, debate, drama, poetry, and art. The material uses the Socratic method to engage students and to encourage the use of critical thinking, reasoning, and expression. Such modes of thought and communication foster the sense of wonder that is at the root of serious introspection, intellectual growth, and ethical reflection. In February 2012, the American Philosophical Association's Committee on Pre-Collegiate Philosophy featured Winning Words and the Civic Knowledge Project in its Central Division meeting.

Before the US Department of Education cut funding for such programs in the early 1990s, there were over 5,000 programs in K–12 schools nationwide which engaged young people in philosophical reflection or critical thinking, more generally. This number has dropped substantially.

== P4C Events ==
=== USA ===
There is an annual Philosophy Slam competition for kids in grades K–12. Younger children are encouraged to submit artwork that illustrates their philosophical reflections while older children submit increasingly sophisticated written work.

=== Australia ===
Throughout Australia Community of Inquiry days are held by regional affiliates of the Federation of Asia-Pacific Philosophy in Schools Associations. These events apply the Lipman model of philosophical inquiry in an inter-mural setting. They are non-competitive by nature, with students encouraged to seek collaborative means to resolve philosophical challenges. Notable examples are held annually by the Victorian Association for Philosophy in Schools and the South Australian Philosophy in Education Association.

In 2007 a competition was created in Perth Western Australia called a Philosothon. Each Australian state now holds an annual Philosothon and Australian Association of Philosophy (AAP) hosts the Australasian Philosothon in different states each year. There are over 400 schools involved in Philosothons in Australasia, Europe and the UK.

== Journals ==
There have been several academic journals devoted to publishing work regarding philosophy for/with children.

- Thinking: The Journal of Philosophy for Children, published between 1979 and 2014, contained some work by young philosophers but consisted primarily of work by adults about their work doing philosophy for children including lesson plans, developmental psychology, and work from the emerging field called "Hermeneutics of childhood" which is a multi-disciplinary approach to considering the intellectual and emotional life of children.
- Critical and Creative Thinking: The Australasian Journal of Philosophy in Education
- Analytic Teaching and Philosophical Praxis is a peer-reviewed, open access academic journal published out of Viterbo University (La Crosse, Wisconsin) dedicated to exploring the deeper philosophical and ethical implications of education.
- Childhood and Philosophy
- Questions: Philosophy for Young People has as its mission the publication of work that features the philosophical reflections of children, themselves. Thus, it contains essays authored by children, transcripts of classroom dialogues with some commentary by moderators, artwork by children, and so forth. It also publishes the winners of the Philosophy Slam competition.
- Journal for Philosophy in Schools is the official journal of FAPSA. The focus of the journal is research into philosophy with school-aged children.
- Farhang (Culture): Quarterly Journal of Humanities and Cultural Studies, Issue Topics: Philosophy for Children, vol. 22 No 69, Spring 2009, Ed. Saeed Naji (Farhang) is the official journal of the Institute for Humanities and Cultural Studies. The issue includes articles in four languages about philosophy for children throughout the world.

== Books ==
A number of books have been published on philosophy for children other than those mentioned above by Matthews and Lipman. Some are intended to be read by children, others by children with their parents, and still others by philosophers, educators, and policy-makers considering the merits of K–12 philosophy programs. A partial (by no means exhaustive or representative) list includes the books:

- 20 Thinking Tools by Phil Cam
- 40 lessons to get children thinking: Philosophical thought adventures across the curriculum by Peter Worley
- Big Ideas for Little Kids by Thomas Wartenberg
- Cruelty Bites by Ellen Duthie and Daniela Martagón (from the Wonder Ponder Visual Philosophy for Children series)
- Dialogues with Children by Gareth Matthews
- Engaging with Ethics: Ethical Inquiry for Teachers" by Mark Freakley and Gilbert Burgh
- Ethics and the Community of Inquiry: Education for Deliberative Democracy by Gilbert Burgh, Terri Field and Mark Freakley
- I, Person by Ellen Duthie and Daniela Martagón (from the Wonder Ponder Visual Philosophy for Children series)
- Games for Thinking by Robert Fisher (UK academic)
- Growing Up with Philosophy Matthew Lipman and Ann Margaret Sharp (eds.)
- Harry Potter and Philosophy: If Aristotle Ran Hogwarts, an anthology edited by David Baggett and Shawn Klein
- History, Theory and Practice of Philosophy for Children: International Perspectives, Saeed Naji and Rosnani Hashim (eds.)
- Once Upon an If by Peter Worley
- P4c Criterion for Stories by Saeed Naji
- Philosophy and the Young Child by Gareth Matthews
- A Mad Dash for Seats by Daydaad
- Philosophy for children: Animation-based Manual by Saeed Naji and Samaneh Askari
- Philosophy for Kids: 40 Fun Questions That Help You Wonder About Everything and The Examined Life: Advanced Philosophy for Kids, both by David A. White
- Philosophy for Young Children: A Practical Guide by Berys Gaut and Morag Gaut
- Philosophy in Schools edited by Michael Hand and Carrie Winstanley
- Philosophy in the Classroom by Matthew Lipman's, Ann Margaret Sharp, Fredrick S. Oscanyan
- Pocket P4C: Getting Started with Philosophy for Children by Jason Buckley
- Poems for Thinking by Robert Fisher
- Provocations, Philosophy in Secondary Schools by David Birch
- Social Reconstruction Learning: Dualism, Dewey and Philosophy in Schools by Jennifer Bleazby
- Teaching Ethics in Schools by Phil Cam
- Teaching for Better Thinking by Laurance J. Splitter and Ann M. Sharp
- The If Machine: Philosophical Enquiry in the Classroom by Peter Worley (co-founder and CEO of The Philosophy Foundation), guided philosophy sessions for use in the classroom complete with teaching thinking strategies
- The If Odyssey: A Philosophical Journey Through Greek Myth and Storytelling for 8 – 16-Year-Olds by Peter Worley
- The Machine Who Was Also a Boy by Mike McRae and Tom Dullemond, a fiction fantasy adventure book (with accompanying teaching guide) addressing philosophical paradoxes, aimed at middle-grade students (age 10)
- The Numberverse by Andrew Day
- The Philosophers' Club by Christopher Phillips and Kim Doner
- The Philosophical Child by Jana Mohr Lone
- The Philosophy of Childhood by Gareth Matthews
- The Philosophy Shop a book of philosophical stimuli from academics around the world in aid of The Philosophy Foundation, edited by Peter Worley
- The Pig that Wants to be Eaten by Julian Baggini
- The Socratic Classroom: Reflective Thinking through Collaborative Inquiry by Sarah Davey Chesters
- Thinking in Education by Matthew Lipman
- Thinking Stories, books 1–3 by Phil Cam
- Thinking Together: Philosophical Inquiry for the Classroom by Phil Cam
- Thoughtings by Peter Worley and Andrew Day
- Sophie's World a novel by Jostein Gaarder
- Stories for Thinking by Robert Fisher
- Values Education in Schools: A resource book for student inquiry by Mark Freakley, Gilbert Burgh, and Lyne Tilt MacSporran
- Whatever You Want, by Ellen Duthie and Daniela Martagón (from the Wonder Ponder Visual Philosophy for Children series)
- Wise Guy: The Life and Adventures of Socrates, a picture book version of the engaging life of Socrates by M.D. Usher and illustrator William Bramhall
- Young Person's Guide to Philosophy from the DK series of educational books
- Philosophy for Children and Teenagers: The best 123 questions: Including many pictures that will encourage the joint thinking process by Michael Siegmund

== See also ==
- Community of Inquiry
- Philosophy education
- Philosophy of education
