= The Big Questions: A Short Introduction to Philosophy =

Philosophy book

- Author: Robert C. Solomon, Kathleen Higgins
- Language: English
- Subject: Philosophy
- Genre: Textbook
- Publisher: Harcourt Brace Jovanovich / Cengage
- Publication date: 1982
- Publication place: United States
- Pages: 464
- ISBN: 978-1305955448
- OCLC: 1391289812

The Big Questions: A Short Introduction to Philosophy is an introductory philosophy textbook written by American philosopher Robert C. Solomon and co-authored in later editions by Kathleen Higgins. First published in 1982 by Harcourt Brace Jovanovich, the work reached its tenth edition in 2018 through Cengage Learning. The text structures philosophical concepts around core thematic problems, providing readers with exercises to evaluate personal assumptions alongside historical arguments.

== Overview and structure ==
The textbook arranges topics conceptually rather than following a strict historical timeline. Each chapter examines a fundamental area of philosophical inquiry: the meaning of life, the existence of God, metaphysics, truth, human identity, free will, morality, justice, aesthetics, and non-Western philosophical traditions.

Chapters open with preliminary reflection questions intended to prompt readers to articulate initial positions before encountering formal arguments. The main text pairs thematic commentary with primary source excerpts from historical and contemporary thinkers. Introductory modules cover basic logic, distinguishing deductive and inductive arguments while identifying common informal fallacies. Appendices present practical guides for analyzing argument structures and composing philosophy essays.

== Publication history ==
Harcourt Brace Jovanovich published the first edition in 1982. Subsequent editions were published by Wadsworth Publishing and Cengage Learning. Kathleen Higgins joined Solomon as co-author on later editions and continued revising the work following Solomon's death in 2007. Each chapter is formatted as a self-contained unit, allowing instructors to assign topics in varying order.

Foreign language translations have been released internationally. History of science scholar Zhang Butian translated the text into Chinese, published by Guangxi Normal University Press in 2004.

== Contents ==
The book contains eleven core chapters along with introductory logic modules and reference appendices:

- Introduction: Doing Philosophy
- A Little Logic
- Chapter 1: Philosophical Questions
- Chapter 2: The Meaning of Life
- Chapter 3: God
- Chapter 4: The Nature of Reality
- Chapter 5: The Search for Truth
- Chapter 6: Self
- Chapter 7: Freedom
- Chapter 8: Morality and the Good Life
- Chapter 9: Justice and the Good Society
- Chapter 10: Beauty
- Chapter 11: Non-Western Philosophy
- Appendix A: Writing Philosophy
- Appendix B: Deductive Logic Valid Argument Forms
- Appendix C: Common Informal Fallacies

== Reception and pedagogical impact ==
The Big Questions has been reviewed in academic publications focused on philosophical instruction. Writing in the APA Newsletter on Teaching Philosophy, philosopher Carrie Figdor highlighted the book's thematic organization and pre-reading reflective prompts, noting its emphasis on developing individual student reasoning alongside primary text analysis.

The text has been incorporated into secondary and higher education curricula internationally. It features in recommended resource lists for the Victorian Certificate of Education philosophy curriculum in Australia. Curriculum researchers have also referenced Solomon's approach in secondary-school critical thinking framework proposals.
