= Questions: Philosophy for Young People =

- Discipline: Philosophy
- Language: English
- Edited by: Stone Addington and Ariel Sykes

Publication details
- History: 2001–present
- Publisher: Philosophy Documentation Center (United States)
- Frequency: Annual

Standard abbreviations
- ISO 4: Questions

Indexing
- ISSN: 1541-4760 (print); 2154-1183 (web)
- LCCN: 2002-211974
- OCLC no.: 50436104

Links
- Journal homepage; Online access

Questions: Philosophy for Young People is a peer-reviewed academic journal sponsored by the Philosophy Learning and Teaching Organization (PLATO), the American Philosophical Association, and York College of Pennsylvania. It publishes short articles, discussions, drawings, and other writings by school students interested in philosophical issues. Questions is published in an easy to read format to make it accessible to students of all ages, though it is also intended for teachers and parents who want to introduce philosophy to children. The journal is published by the Philosophy Documentation Center. Members of the American Association of Philosophy Teachers have online access to this journal as a benefit of membership.

== History ==
The editor-in-chief of the first 5 issues of Questions (2001–2005) was Jana Mohr Lone. Rory Kraft and Allison Reiheld co-edited the following 3 issues; Kraft continued to edit the journal from 2008. The 2006 issue was funded in part by Michigan State University, at the time the home of both Kraft and Reiheld. As of 2025, it is edited by Stone Addington and Ariel Sykes, and includes a section for high school research.

== Abstracting and indexing ==
The journal is abstracted and indexed by Academic Outline, Google Scholar, InfoTrac, Philosophy Research Index, and PhilPapers.

== See also ==
- List of philosophy journals
