= Self-validating reduction =

A self-validating reduction is kind of self-fulfilling prophecy of which the result is a dramatic reduction in a person, group, or natural being. This term was coined by Anthony Weston and used in his book Back to Earth in 1994. Following Weston's work, Bob Jickling, et al. in Environmental Education, Ethics, and Action (United Nations Education Program (UNEP), 2006) wrote:

A self-validating reduction is a self-fulfilling prophecy in which one of the main effects of the "prophecy" is to reduce someone or something in the world. It acts to make that person or thing less than they, or it, are or could be; or it diminishes some part of the world’s richness, depth and promise. And, this reduction in turn feeds back, not only to justify the original "prophecy" but also to perpetuate it.

== Definition and examples ==
According to Thomas Schelling’s classic (1978) treatment, the term “self-fulfilling prophecy” originally referred to a process in which a negative but quite possibly baseless expectation or prediction generates a feedback loop that ends by producing exactly the expected negative result: the diminution or defeat of something originally stable and seemingly solid. The standard example is a run on an initially solvent bank that can accelerate into a panic and drive the bank into bankruptcy simply because very few banks, however well-managed, can cash out large numbers of depositors upon unexpected demand. The term has since broadened greatly, however, to include any self-augmenting expectation, prediction, or disposition, many of which can also have positive effects. High self-esteem, however ill-founded, may produce more confident and capable acts, hence "fulfilling" itself. Other interpersonal expectations such as predictions of student success, initially quite baseless, can produce student success through subtly altering the expectations of their teachers.

A 1996 article by philosopher Anthony Weston refocused on part of what Schelling described as the original denotation of “self-fulfilling prophecy” using the more specific term “self-validating reduction”. The "reduction" is an actual change – some kind of deprivation, loss, or diminution – not merely a "prophecy" in the sense of an attitude change in another person or society at large; and a change that comes to justify or "validate" a changed judgment of the person changed or reduced, specifically by ignoring the actual cause of the reduction and attributing it instead to the essential character of the reduced person(s) instead.

For example, the abolitionist Frederick Douglass pointed out that

Ignorance and depravity, and the inability to arise from degradation to civilization and respectability, are the most usual allegations against the oppressed. The evils most fostered by slavery and oppression are precisely those which slaveholders and oppressors would transfer from their system to the inherent character of their victims. Thus the very crimes of slavery become slavery’s best defense. By making the enslaved a character fit only for slavery, they excuse themselves for failing to make the slave a freeman.

Among many other possible examples are the Nazi concentration camps, designed to destroy the inmates' very humanity and thus to validate the Nazis’ prejudices and make systematic murder possible; and the ways in which prejudiced persons, convinced of (say) a co-worker's incapacity or inequality, are likely to reduce their co-workers to uncooperative antagonists: missing their own contribution to the process, they will then naturally conclude that their co-workers – not themselves – are incapable of good work.

== Other animals and nature ==
Self-validating reduction applies beyond the human sphere as well. For example, wild animals who were not originally hostile or wary become that way upon being hunted. Scientific research on other animals that tends to avoid calling on their social instincts, in the name of objectivity, may in fact drive them away and actually induce an avoidance of humans that then is taken to be an objective and independent fact about them. Highly confined and managed animals under "factory farming" can be reduced to a state of social and physical dysfunction that seems to be their "inherent character", as Douglass puts it, thus making their treatment less morally troubling, and thereby making them more available for further reduction in turn.

The ecological critic Paul Shepard noted that land can be reduced in self-validating ways as well, as when Isaiah commands Israel to “tear down the [pagan] altars, break their images, cut down their groves” – so that it becomes true, as it may not have been initially, that only the other world, beyond nature, is truly sacred. Shepard called this kind of self-validating reduction “the evangelical desacralizing of place”.

== See also ==
- Self-fulfilling prophecy
