= Alan Fox (philosopher) =

American philosopher (born 1955)

Alan David Fox
- Born: 1955 (age 70–71); New Jersey, United States
- Awards: Fulbright Scholar, Carnegie Foundation Delaware Professor of the Year (2006), American Association of Philosophy Teachers National Fellow (2012)

Education
- Education: Temple University (PhD, MA), Johns Hopkins University (BA)

Philosophical work
- Era: 21st-century philosophy
- Region: Comparative philosophy
- Institutions: University of Delaware
- Main interests: Asian Philosophy, Chinese Philosophy, Indian Philosophy, Comparative Religion

Alan David Fox (born 1955) is a professor of philosophy and religion at the University of Delaware. He specializes in Eastern Religion and Philosophy.

== Early life and education ==
Fox was raised in suburban southern New Jersey with a father who was an engineer. Fox states his father’s tendency to tell him to figure out questions Fox asked on his own was the impetus for his interest in religion. Alan Fox earned his B.A. in psychology from Johns Hopkins University in 1977 and his Ph.D. in Religion from Temple University in 1988. He studied as a Fulbright Scholar in Taiwan in 1986–87.

== Career ==
Fox is a professor of Asian and comparative philosophy at the University of Delaware. He was at one point the director of the University of Delaware Honors College, a position that is now a dean level position. In 2006 he was awarded the Carnegie Foundation Delaware Professor of the Year award. He has served in administrative roles, including as Faculty Senate President in 2008. In 2009 he was one of 15 national finalists for the Inspire Integrity Award, an award presented by the National Society of Collegiate Scholars. In 2012, Fox was awarded a National Teaching Fellowship by the American Association of Philosophy Teachers (AAPT) for his contributions to advancing philosophy education. In 2016 Fox was interviewed twice in his opposition to the University of Delaware’s proposed shift to put academic research first. Fox voiced the importance of professors who put teaching first.

== Work ==
Fox specializes in Eastern Philosophy specifically topics related to religions with strong roots in China. He is particularly notable for his work on wu wei and dao and interpretations of Zhuangzhi. In 2009 he was published in an article for the Carnegie Council discussing religion as an institution. He has been published in Asian Philosophy and the Journal of Chinese Philosophy, and his work is cited within the Chinese comparative philosophy community.
