= Matthew Lipman =

American philosopher and writer (1923–2010)

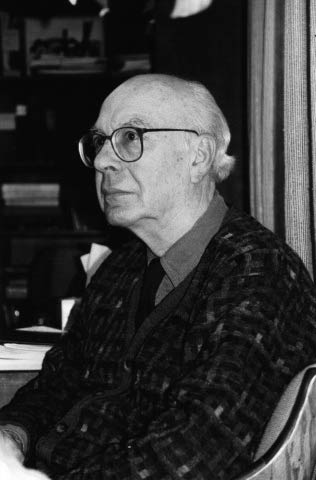

Matthew Lipman (August 24, 1923 in Vineland, New Jersey – December 26, 2010 in West Orange, New Jersey) is recognized as the founder of the contemporary Philosophy for Children movement. His belief that children possess the ability to think abstractly from an early age led him to the conviction that children's education should focus on helping them to improve their reasoning, inquiry, and judgment skills.

== Life ==
Lipman served in the United States Army during the Second World War, with campaigns in France, Germany, and Austria. He was a Fulbright Scholar at the Sorbonne in Paris from 1950-1951, where he met and married another Fulbright Scholar, Wynona Moore, who became the first African-American woman to be elected to the New Jersey State Senate. Lipman completed his Ph.D. in Philosophy at Columbia University in 1953, where he met and began a correspondence with the American philosopher John Dewey. His Dewey-inspired dissertation was published in (1967) as What Happens in Art.

From 1954–972 Lipman was a Professor of Philosophy at the College of Pharmaceutical Sciences affiliated with Columbia University and, from 1962–1972, he served as the Chair of General Education there. During these years he was mentored by, developed a friendship with, and devoted most of his scholarship to the metaphysical system of the American philosopher Justus Buchler.

In 1972 Lipman left Columbia for Montclair State College, where, in 1974, he co-founded the Institute for the Advancement of Philosophy for Children (IAPC) with Ann Margaret Sharp. Lipman invented the genre of the curricular philosophical novel for children, beginning with Harry Stottlemeier's Discovery, which he pilot tested in Montclair and Newark schools, supported by grants from the College of Pharmacy and the National Endowment for the Humanities. Lipman wrote a series of nine philosophical novels, for elementary through high school grades, each with instructional manuals he co-wrote with Sharp and other colleagues. Lipman and Sharp theorized the “community of philosophical inquiry” as the protocol for children’s philosophical practice and conducted courses and professional development workshops on this protocol for philosophers and teachers all over the world. In 1979 Lipman launched Thinking: The Journal of Philosophy for Children as the journal’s editor.

Lipman was a prolific scholar. In addition to his curricular titles he published 14 books, 53 book chapters, 83 academic journal articles, and numerous articles in professional magazines. His scholarship focused on the theory of human thinking and judgment, in which he combined pragmatist theory of inquiry with social psychology, and on educational reform. His most important work was two editions of Thinking in Education (Cambridge University Press 1991, 2003).

Lipman was named a Distinguished University Scholar at Montclair in 1995. He received honorary doctorates from Quincy College (Illinois, 1988) and the University of Mons-Hainaut (Belgium, 1994). Lipman retired in 2001. That year he received the American Philosophical Association and Philosophy Documentation Center Prize for Excellence and Innovation in Philosophy Programs. In 2008 the IAPC published his autobiography, A Life Teaching Thinking. Lipman died in 2010.

Lipman died, aged 87, in West Orange, New Jersey on December 26, 2010, from complications of Parkinson’s disease.

== Academic timeline ==
- Undergraduate study at Stanford University, California; Shrivenham American University, England; School of General Studies, Columbia University, New York.
- 1948 – B.S., Columbia University, General Studies.
- 1953 – Instructor in Philosophy, Brooklyn College, Spring.
- Graduate study at Columbia University; Sorbonne, Paris; University of Vienna, Austria.
- 1953 – Ph.D., Columbia University.
- 1953 to 1975 – Adjunct Assistant and Associate Professor, School of General Studies, Columbia University.
- 1954 to 1972 – Assistant, Associate and Professor of Philosophy, College of Pharmaceutical Sciences, Columbia University, (Also, Chairman, Department of General Education during this period).
- 1954 to 1962 – Lecturer in Philosophy and Contemporary Civilization, Columbia College, Columbia University.
- 1955 to 1963 – Lecturer in Contemporary Civilization, Mannes College of Music, New York City.
- 1960 to 1972 – Chairman, Philosophy Department, Evening Division, Baruch School, City College of New York.
- 1961 to 1963 – Lecturer in Contemporary Civilization, College of Engineering, Columbia University.
- 1962 to 1972 – Chairman, Department of General Education, College of Pharmaceutical Sciences, Columbia University.
- 1963 to 1964 – Visiting Professor of Philosophy, Sarah Lawrence College.
- 1972 to 2001 – Professor of Philosophy, Montclair State College / University.
- 1974 to 2001 – Director, Institute for the Advancement of Philosophy for Children, Montclair State College / University.

== Bibliography ==
- What Happens in Art (New York: Appleton Century Crofts, 1967).
- Discovering Philosophy (1st edition, New York: Appleton Century Crofts, 1969; 2nd edition, Englewood Cliffs, Prentice Hall, 1977).
- Contemporary Aesthetics (Boston: Allyn and Bacon, 1973).
- Harry Stottlemeier's Discovery (N.J.: IAPC, 1974).
- Philosophical Inquiry (Instructional Manual to Accompany Harry Stottlemeier's Discovery), with Ann Margaret Sharp (N.J.: IAPC, 1975). Second Edition: Philosophical Inquiry, with Ann Margaret Sharp and Frederick S. Oscanyan (N.J.: IAPC, 1979), co published with University Press, 1984.
- Philosophy for Children (edited with Terrell Ward Bynam) (Oxford: Basil Blackwell, 1976).
- Lisa (N.J.: IAPC, 1976), 2nd edition, IAPC, 1983.
- Ethical Inquiry, with Ann Margaret Sharp and Frederick S. Oscanyan (N.J.: IAPC, 1977) 2nd ed., IAPC and UPA, 1985.
- Philosophy in the Classroom, with Ann Margaret Sharp and Frederick S. Oscanyan (1st edition, N.J.: IAPC, 1977. 2nd edition, Philadelphia: Temple University Press, 1980).
- Growing Up With Philosophy, ed. with Ann Margaret Sharp (Philadelphia: Temple University Press, 1978).
- Suki (N.J.: IAPC, 1978).
- Mark (N.J.: IAPC, 1980).
- Writing: How and Why (instructional manual to accompany Suki; N.J.: IAPC, 1980).
- Social Inquiry (instructional manual to accompany Mark; N.J.: IAPC, 1980).
- Pixie (N.J.: IAPC, 1981).
- Kio and Gus (N.J.: IAPC, 1982).
- Looking for Meaning (with Ann Margaret Sharp) (N.J.: IAPC, 1982) UPA, 1984.
- Wondering at the World (with Ann Margaret Sharp) (N.J.: IAPC, 1984).
- Elfie (N.J.: IAPC, 1987).
- Harry Prime (N.J.: IAPC, 1987).
- Philosophy Goes to School (Philadelphia: Temple U. Press, 1988).
- Getting Our Thoughts Together, with Ann Gazzard (Upper Montclair, NJ: IAPC, 1988).
- Thinking in Education (New York: Cambridge University Press, 1991; 2nd edition, 2003).
- Thinking Children and Education (Dubuque, Iowa: Kendall/Hunt, 1993).
- Natasha: Vygotskian Dialogues (New York: Teachers College Press, 1996).
- Nous (New Jersey, I.A.P.C., 1996)
- Deciding What to Do (Instructional Manual to Nous, New Jersey;IAPC, 1996)

== See also ==
- American philosophy
- List of American philosophers
