= Karen Markosyan =

Armenian footballer

Personal information
- Date of birth: 23 October 1968 (age 58)
- Position: Midfielder

Senior career*
Years	Team	Apps	(Gls)
1986–1992	Ararat Yerevan	123	(43)
1993	Kotayk Abovyan	6	(2)
1993–1994	Sachsen Leipzig		
1994–1995	1. SV Gera	21	(5)
1997–1998	Köpetdag Aşgabat		
1998–1999	Zvartnots-AAL		

International career
1998–1999	Armenia	2	(0)
- * Club domestic league appearances and goals

Karen Markosyan (Armenian: Կարեն Մարկոսյան; born 23 October 1968) is a retired Armenian football midfielder.

== Career statistics ==
=== International ===
As of match played 3 March 1999

Appearances and goals by national team and year
National team	Year	Apps	Goals
Armenia	1998	1	0
Armenia	1999	1	0
Total		2	0
