= Philosophy Learning and Teaching Organization =

Organization for precollege philosophy in USA

- Established: 2010
- Location: Seattle
- Executive Director: Jana Mohr Lone
- Affiliations: American Philosophical Association, University of Washington
- Website: plato-philosophy.org

The Philosophy Learning and Teaching Organization (PLATO) is a U.S. non-profit membership organization established in 2010 by a committee of the American Philosophical Association to promote philosophy to K-12 students. An advocate for the Philosophy for Children movement, PLATO became an independent 501(c)(3) organization in 2012 and merged with the Center for Philosophy for Children in Seattle in 2022. As a member of the UNESCO Chair program "Practices of Philosophy with Children," PLATO maintains affiliations with the University of Nantes and the University of Washington, as well as other institutions.

== Notable Initiatives ==
- The Philosophers-in-Residence program
- A database of philosophical lesson plans called "The Philosophy Toolkit"
- Multiple grant opportunities to support precollegiate access to philosophy

PLATO also sponsors two journals:

- Precollege Philosophy and Public Practice, edited by Kristopher G. Phillips
- Questions: Philosophy for Young People, edited by Ariel Sykes and Stone Addington
