= Robert Fisher (UK academic) =

British educational theorist (born 1943)

Robert Fisher (born 1943) is a former Professor of Education at Brunel University, with a particular interest in the teaching of Philosophy to children. He published several books including:

- Unlocking literacy: a guide for teachers
- Teaching Children to Think
- Teaching Thinking: philosophical enquiry in the classroom
