= Frithjof Bergmann =

German philosopher (1930–2021)

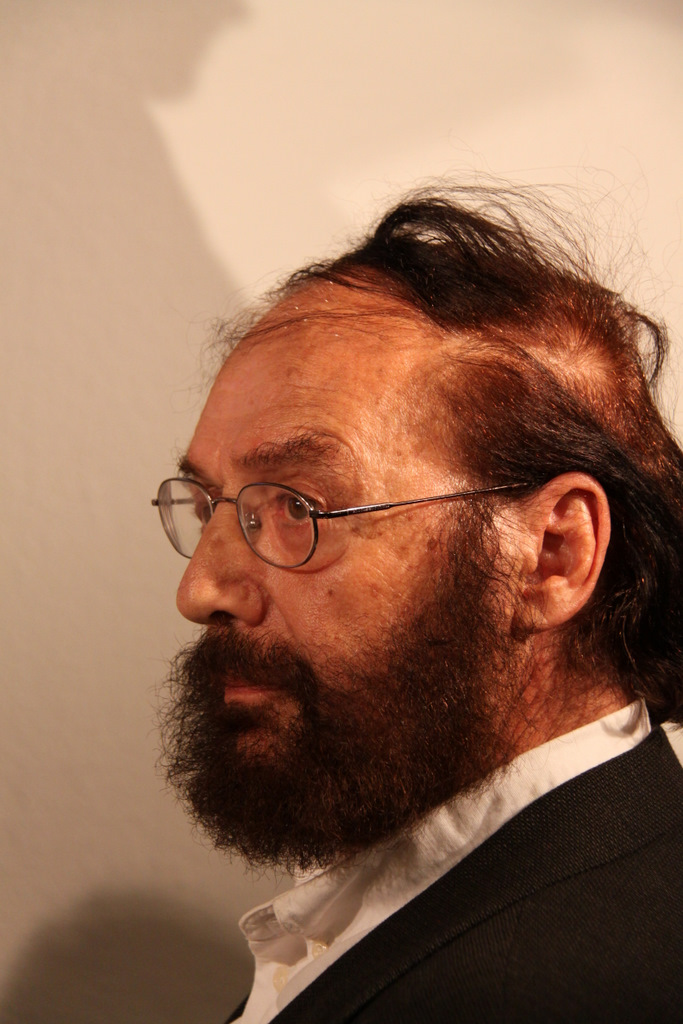
- Born: 24 December 1930; Weickelsdorf, Weißenfels, Province of Saxony, Free State of Prussia, Germany
- Died: 23 May 2021 (aged 90); Ann Arbor, Michigan, U.S.

Academic background
- Education: Princeton University (PhD)
- Thesis: Harmony and Reason: An Introduction to the Philosophy of Hegel (1959)

Academic work
- Era: Contemporary philosophy
- Region: Western philosophy
- School or tradition: German idealism
- Main interests: Existentialism; Cultural philosophy Politics; Ethics
- Notable ideas: New Work

Frithjof Harold Bergmann (24 December 1930 – 23 May 2021) was a German professor of philosophy at the University of Michigan, where he taught courses on existentialism, continental philosophy, Hegel, and Marx. He was known for the concept of New Work.

== Life and work ==
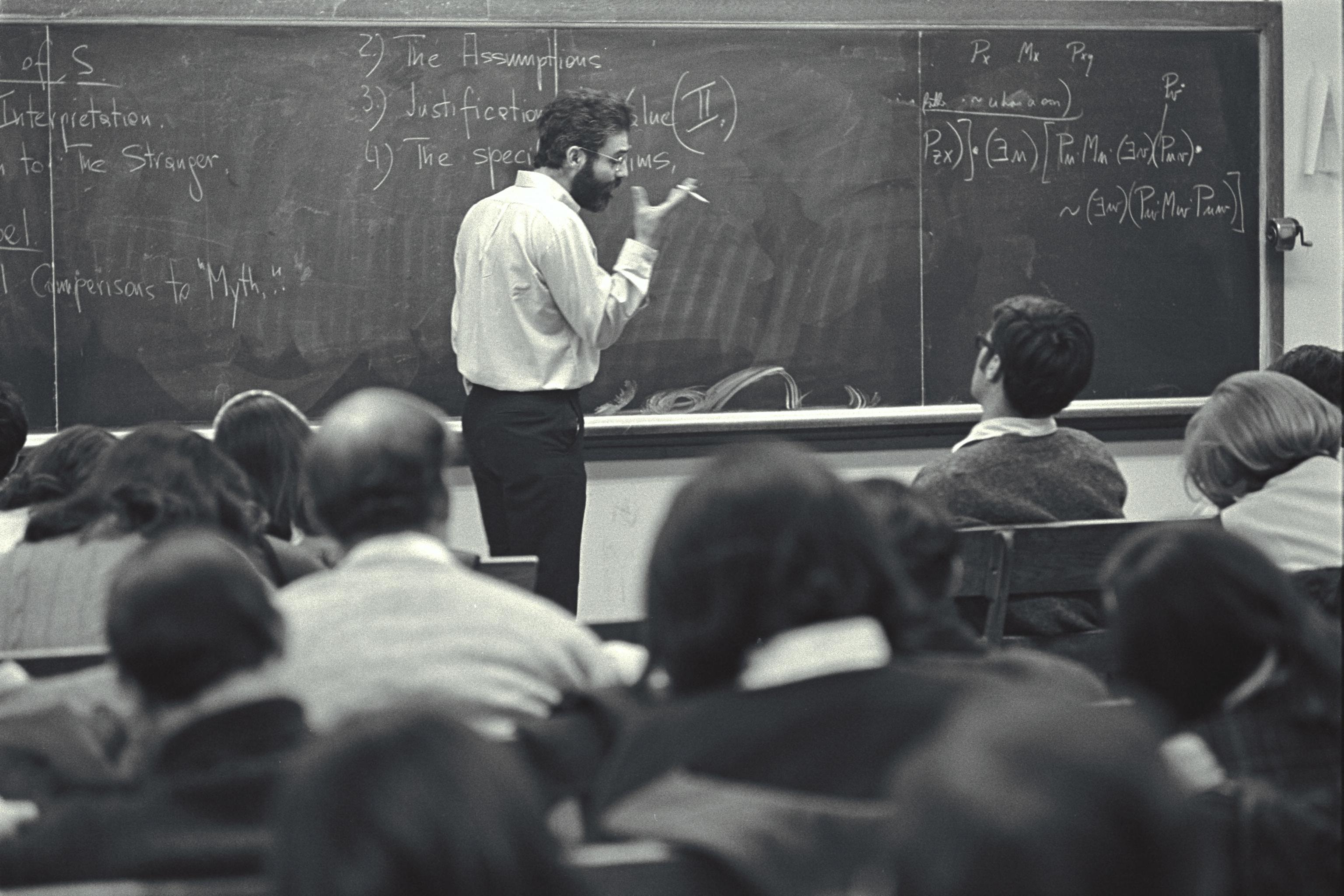
Bergmann lecturing in 1967

Frithjof Bergmann first moved to the US as a student, where he lived and worked throughout his life. He entered the doctoral program in philosophy at Princeton University and studied under Walter Kaufmann, receiving his Ph.D. in 1959 with a dissertation entitled "Harmony and Reason: An Introduction to the Philosophy of Hegel." In addition, Professor Bergmann was a Nietzsche scholar; his publications include "Nietzsche's Critique of Morality" (published in Reading Nietzsche, Oxford University Press, 1988). He spent most of his academic career at the University of Michigan, where he was a professor and visible political activist. He taught also at The University of California, Berkeley, Stanford University and The University of California, Santa Cruz. Among his more notable PhD students at the University of Michigan were Robert C. Solomon and Anthony Weston. He is credited as one of the creators of the teach-in, the first of which was held on the Michigan campus in March 1965.

Frithjof Bergmann's interests included continental philosophy—especially Hegel, Nietzsche, Sartre and existentialism generally—and also social and political philosophy, philosophical anthropology, and philosophy of culture. His article The Experience of Values (reprinted in Revisions: Changing Perspectives in Moral Philosophy by University of Notre Dame Press, 1983) is used in universities throughout the world. His book On Being Free (1977) was issued in a paperback edition in 1978. In this book, Bergmann argues against the standard views of freedom as the lack of external obstacles or as an irrational, unencumbered act that rejects all order. Both of these leave us with nothing substantial for a self at all—and thus, he suggests, constitute virtually a reductio ad absurdum of modern ideals of education, society, and the family. Instead, he argues that the primary prerequisite of freedom is a self possessed of something that wants to be acted out. An act is free, he argues, if the agent identifies with the elements from which it flows. The real problems of education, society, etc. are those of coming to a true understanding of one's self and of building a society with which a self can identify.

In the years between 1976 and 1979 he undertook trips to the former countries of the Eastern Bloc and began to question capitalism and communism. In this time, he introduces his concept of New Work. In 1984, Bergmann founded an organization called the Center for New Work in Flint, Michigan. Together with others he formulated a novel proposal that became known as the "6 months--6 months proposal."

Bergmann died in Ann Arbor, Michigan on 23 May 2021, at the age of 90.

== New Work ==
The concept of New Work describes the new way of working of today's society in the global and digital age. The term was coined by Bergmann and is based on his research on the notion of freedom and the assumption that the previous work system was outdated.

=== Philosophy ===
Bergmann's concept starts with a critical assessment of the American understanding of liberty. He does not consider liberty the option to choose between two or more, more or less better or worse options (liberty to choose); his understanding of liberty is the option to do something that is really, really important (decide what you want to do because you believe in it).

The core values of the concept of New Work are autonomy, freedom and participation in the community. New Work should offer new ways of creativity and personal development, thus contributing something really important to the job market. In this way, real "freedom of action" is possible. The main idea of New Work is to create space for creativity and self-fulfillment (or: The Pursuit of Happiness). Since he considers the job system to be obsolete, mankind has the option to get rid of wage labor.

=== Structure ===
The early capitalistic system of wage labour should slowly be transformed into New Work. This New Work should consist of three parts:

1. A third gainful employment
2. A third High-Tech-Self-Providing ('self-sufficiency') and smart consumption
3. A third of work that you really, really want.

==== Gainful employment ====
Since the quantity of available gainful labor (traditional work to be done) - in the context of the industrial society - will become less due to automation in all economic domains, advocates of New Work suggest reduced gainful employment for everyone. The time released by this reduction of gainful employment should in return create the financial basis to create things that can neither be produced through do-it-yourself work (active work?) nor by neighbour-based networks.

==== High tech self providing and smart consumption ====
Satisfying the needs of mankind will be supported by high tech self-providing using the newest technology. In the projected future, automated multifunctional devices known as "fabbers" are expected to possess the capability for autonomous goods production.

Bergmann considers 'Smart Consumption' that people should contemplate and decide what they really need. According to Bergmann, many products and things are irrelevant, since they consume more time when using them than they save. One example could be the garlic press: very often the time cleaning the device consumes more time than the 'time saved' by using the press compared to manual pressing/cutting.

By self-supply and smart consumption, people can maintain a good standard of living even though only one-third of the entire capacity is used for wage labor.

==== Work that you really, really want ====
This is the most important component of New Work. The idea is: work as such is endless and it is a lot more than what is and can be provided by the wage labor system. According to Bergmann, every human being can find work that is aligned with the own values, desires, dreams, hope, and skills.

Since Bergmann denies a revolutionary process to overcome the wage labor system, change can only happen slowly and this change can only be achieved through people that closely analyze their real, real desires and pursue those desires. By doing so, they become more and more independent from the wage labor system.

In so-called 'centers for new work' the idea is that people collaborate and with the support of mentors, they try to identify what kind of work they really, really want to do. This process is of course complex, demanding and time-consuming. Bergmann uses the term 'Selbstunkenntnis'. By the process of trying to identify what a person really, really wants to do, a general movement could begin that changes one's life so that people feel 'more alive'.

== Books ==
- On Being Free. University of Notre Dame, November 1977; ISBN 0-268-01492-2
- Menschen, Märkte, Lebenswelten. Differenzierung und Integration in den Systemen der Wohnungslosenhilfe. VSH Verlag Soziale Hilfe, 1999; ISBN 3-923074-65-4
- Neue Arbeit, Neue Kultur. Aus dem Amerikanischen übersetzt von Stephan Schuhmacher - Arbor Verlag, 2004; ISBN 3-924195-96-X
- New Work New Culture: Work We Want and a Culture that Strengthens Us. Zero Books, 2019; ISBN 978-1-78904-064-7
- Frithjof Bergmann: Die Freiheit leben. - Arbor Verlag, Freiamt, 2005; ISBN 3-936855-03-X
- Frithjof Bergmann/Stella Friedmann: Neue Arbeit kompakt: Vision einer selbstbestimmten Gesellschaft. Arbor Verlag, Freiamt 2007; ISBN 3924195951
