= Kathleen Higgins =

American philosopher

- Born: Kathleen Marie Higgins; 1954 (age 71–72)
- Spouse: Robert C. Solomon (died 2007)

Education
- Education: Yale University (PhD)
- Thesis: The Philosophical Significance of Nietzsche's Use of Fiction in "Thus Spoke Zarathustra" (1982)
- Doctoral advisor: Karsten Harries

Philosophical work
- Era: Contemporary philosophy
- Region: Western philosophy
- School: Continental philosophy
- Institutions: University of Texas at Austin
- Main interests: Aesthetics, philosophy of music

Kathleen Marie Higgins (born 1954) is an American philosopher who is professor of philosophy at the University of Texas at Austin where she has been teaching for over thirty years. She specializes in aesthetics, philosophy of music, nineteenth and twentieth-century continental philosophy, and philosophy of emotion.

== Education and career ==
Higgins earned her B.A. in music from the University of Missouri–Kansas City and completed her graduate work in philosophy at Yale University, receiving her M.A., M.Phil, and PhD. Professor Higgins has taught at the University of California, Riverside, and she is a regular visiting professor at the University of Auckland. She has held appointments as Resident Scholar at the Rockefeller Foundation's Bellagio Study and Conference Center (1993), and as a Visiting Fellow of the Australian National University Philosophy Department and the Canberra School of Music (1997), and also of the Faculty of Psychology and Educational Sciences of KU Leuven (2013). She received an Alumni Achievement Award from the Conservatory of Music at the University of Missouri–Kansas City (1999).

== Philosophical work ==
Her work deals with the philosophy of Friedrich Nietzsche, the ethical aspects of music, musical universality, and the emotion of grief. She has published over fifty articles on these topics as well as on beauty, kitsch, virtue, feminism, marketing environmentalism, Indian aesthetics, Chinese philosophy, musical emotion, synesthesia, television, death, and the philosophies of nineteenth-century philosopher Arthur Schopenhauer and contemporary philosophers Arthur C. Danto and her late husband Robert C. Solomon.

Her books have been translated into 10 languages: Chinese, Dutch, German, Japanese, Korean, Persian, Polish, Portuguese, Slovenian, and Spanish.

She taught a course for The Great Courses, alongside her late husband Robert C. Solomon, entitled Will to Power: The Philosophy of Friedrich Nietzsche (1999). She also taught a course named World Philosophy (2001).

== Works ==
- Nietzsche's Zarathustra (Temple University Press, 1987; rev. ed. 2010), which was named one of the Outstanding Academic Books of 1988-1989 by Choice.
- The Music of Our Lives (Temple University Press, 1991, new ed. 2011).
- Comic Relief: Nietzsche's "Gay Science" (New York: Oxford University Press, 2000).
- A Short History of Philosophy, co-authored with Robert C. Solomon (New York: Oxford University Press, 1996).
- Robert C. Solomon; Kathleen M. Higgins (2000). What Nietzsche really said. Schocken Books. ISBN 978-0-8052-1094-1.
- Robert C. Solomon; Kathleen M. Higgins (1998). A passion for wisdom: a very brief history of philosophy. Oxford University Press. ISBN 978-0-19-511209-2.
- "Arthur Schopenhauer," The Age of German Idealism, Routledge History of Philosophy, Volume VI, Routledge, New York, 1993, Chapter 10.
- The Music between Us: Is Music the Universal Language? (Chicago: Chicago University Press, 2012).

=== Co-edited ===
- Robert C. Solomon; Kathleen M. Higgins, eds. (1990). Reading Nietzsche. Oxford University Press. ISBN 978-0-19-506673-9.
- Robert C. Solomon; Kathleen M. Higgins, eds. (1982). The Big Questions: A Short Introduction to Philosophy. Harcourt Brace Jovanovich. ISBN 978-0-15-505410-3. (8th edition, Cengage Learning, 2009, ISBN 978-0-495-59515-1)
- C. L.. Ten, ed. (1999). Routledge History of Philosophy, Volume VI: The Age of German Idealism. Routledge. ISBN 978-0-415-05604-5.
- The Philosophy of (Erotic) Love, co-edited with Robert C. Solomon (Lawrence: University of Kansas Press, 1991).
- From Africa to Zen: An Invitation to World Philosophy, co-edited with Robert C. Solomon (Lanham, Maryland: Rowman and Littlefield, 1993); second edition, 2003; Chinese translation, 2004.
- The Cambridge Companion to Nietzsche, co-edited with Bernd Magnus (Cambridge: Cambridge University Press, 1994).
- A Companion to Aesthetics, co-edited with Stephen Davies, Robert Hopkins, Robert Stecker, and David Cooper, 2nd ed. (Oxford: Wiley Blackwell, 2009).
- Passion, Death, and Spirituality: The Philosophy of Robert C. Solomon, co-edited with David Sherman, Sophia Studies in Cross-Cultural Philosophy of Traditions and Cultures 1 (Dordrecht: Springer, 2012).
- Kathleen Higgins; Shakti Maira; Sonia Sikka, eds. (2016). Artistic Visions and the Promise of Beauty. Springer Publishing. ISBN 978-3-319-43891-7.

=== Textbooks ===
- Thirteen Questions in Ethics, co-edited with Lee Bowie and Meredith Michaels (San Diego: Harcourt Brace Jovanovich, 1992; Thirteen Questions in Ethics and Social Philosophy, 2nd edition (Fort Worth: Harcourt Brace, 1998).
- World Philosophy: A Text with Readings, co-edited with Robert C. Solomon (New York: McGraw-Hill, 1995).
- Aesthetics in Perspective (edited) (Fort Worth: Harcourt Brace, 1996).
- The Big Questions, co-authored with Robert C. Solomon, 8th ed. (Belmont, Ca.: Wadsworth, 2010); 9th ed., 2014.
- Introducing Philosophy, co-authored with Robert C. Solomon and Clancy Martin, 10th ed. (New York: Oxford University Press, 2012).
