= Robert C. Solomon =

American philosopher

- Born: Robert Charles Solomon; September 14, 1942; Detroit, Michigan, U.S.
- Died: January 2, 2007 (aged 64); Zürich, Switzerland
- Spouse: Kathleen Higgins

Academic background
- Education: University of Michigan (MA, PhD)
- Thesis: Unconscious Motivation (1967)

Academic work
- Era: Contemporary philosophy
- Region: Western philosophy
- School or tradition: Continental philosophy
- Institutions: University of Texas at Austin
- Main interests: History of philosophy; existentialism
- Notable ideas: Intelligence of emotions (cognitivist theory of emotions as evaluative judgments about the world)

Robert Charles Solomon (September 14, 1942 – January 2, 2007) was a philosopher and business ethicist, notable author, and Distinguished Teaching Professor of Business and Philosophy at the University of Texas at Austin, where he held a named chair and taught for more than 30 years, authoring The Passions: Emotions and the Meaning of Life (1976) and more than 45 other books and editions. Critical of the narrow focus of Anglo-American analytic philosophy, which he thought denied human nature and abdicated the important questions of life, he instead wrote analytically in response to the continental discourses of phenomenology and existentialism, on sex and love, on business ethics, and on other topics to which he brought an Aristotelian perspective on virtue ethics. He also wrote A Short History of Philosophy and others with his wife, Kathleen Higgins.

Solomon won many teaching honors, including the Standard Oil Outstanding Teaching Award in 1973; the University of Texas President's Associates Teaching Award (twice); a Fulbright Lecture Award; University Research and National Endowment for the Humanities Grants; and the Chad Oliver Plan II Teaching Award in 1998.

His many works include About Love, Ethics and Excellence, A Better Way to Think about Business, The Joy of Philosophy, Spirituality for the Skeptic, Not Passion's Slave, and In Defense of Sentimentality.

== Personal life and career ==
=== Early life ===
Solomon was born in Detroit, Michigan, U.S. His father was a lawyer, and his mother an artist. He was born with a hole in his heart and was not expected to live into adulthood. He earned a bachelor's degree in molecular biology from the University of Pennsylvania in 1963 and his master's and doctoral degrees in philosophy and psychology from the University of Michigan in 1965 and 1967, respectively.

=== Teaching and research ===
He held visiting appointments at the University of Pennsylvania; the University of Auckland, New Zealand; Mount Holyoke College; Princeton University; the University of California, Los Angeles, and the University of Pittsburgh. From 1972 until his death, except for two years at the University of California at Riverside in the mid-1980s, he taught at University of Texas at Austin, serving as Quincy Lee Centennial Professor of Philosophy and Business. He was a member of the University of Texas Academy of Distinguished Teachers, which is devoted to providing leadership in improving the quality and depth of undergraduate instruction. Solomon was also a member of the inaugural class of Academic Advisors at the Business Roundtable Institute for Corporate Ethics.

His interests were in 19th-century German philosophy—especially Georg Wilhelm Friedrich Hegel and Friedrich Nietzsche—and 20th-century continental philosophy—especially Paul Ricoeur, Jean-Paul Sartre and phenomenology, as well as ethics and the philosophy of emotions. Solomon published more than 40 books on philosophy, and was also a published songwriter. He made a cameo appearance in Richard Linklater's film Waking Life (2001), where he discussed the continuing relevance of existentialism in a postmodern world.

Solomon received numerous teaching awards at the University of Texas at Austin, and was a frequent lecturer in the highly regarded Plan II Honors Program. Solomon was known for his lectures on Søren Kierkegaard, Nietzsche, Sartre and other existentialist philosophers. Solomon described in one lecture a very personal experience he had while a medical student at the University of Michigan. He recounted how he stumbled as if by chance into a crowded lecture hall. He was rather unhappy in his medical studies at the time, and was perhaps seeking something different that day. He got precisely that. The professor, Frithjof Bergmann, was lecturing that day on something that Solomon had not yet been acquainted with. The professor spoke of how Nietzsche's idea of the eternal return asks the fundamental question: "If given the opportunity to live your life over and over again ad infinitum, forced to go through all of the pain and the grief of existence, would you be overcome with despair? Or would you fall to your knees in gratitude?" After this lecture, Solomon quit medical school and began studies in philosophy.

He taught three courses as part of The Great Courses series: Will to Power: The Philosophy of Friedrich Nietzsche, which he taught alongside his wife; No Excuses: Existentialism and the Meaning of Life; and Passions: Philosophy and the Intelligence of Emotions.

=== Marriage, family, and legacy ===
He was married to Kathleen Higgins, with whom he co-authored several of his books. She is a professor of philosophy at University of Texas at Austin. Solomon collapsed and died of pulmonary hypertension on January 2, 2007, while changing planes at Zürich airport.

== Philosophy ==
=== The passions: emotions and the meaning of life ===
Solomon developed a cognitivist theory of emotions as evaluative judgments about the world that inherently manifest a natural, pre-deliberative logic. As such, they are susceptible to rational appraisal and revision no less than our beliefs and propositions, and furthermore to strategic ethical reasoning. Emotions should not be suppressed or repressed by efforts at philosophic rationalism, which suffers a withering critique under his analysis, calling it "emasculated" and "absurd". It is our passions, according to Solomon, and not our reason, which are capable of demonstrating to us the meaning and purpose of life. Every emotion has a purpose or goal, even those that seem stupid or painful. Although the objects and strategies differ with each emotion, person, and relationship, the natural purpose of each is to maximize human dignity, the good for oneself and for humankind. Regarding the "air of paradox surrounding an attempt by philosophy to deal with the passions" and the "certain irony that surrounds an attempt by philosophy to deal with the question of the meaning of life", Solomon asks, "is not philosophy, itself, the problem?". Romeo's conclusion constitutes his premise: "Hang up philosophy! Unless philosophy can make a Juliet."

He derides modernist and contemporary theories of the mind and psyche influenced by materialism and scientism as having created a "myth of the passions", which he explodes, exposing the vicissitudes of its "hydraulic model".

=== On sex, love, marriage, and children ===
Solomon was particularly interested in the idea of love, arguing against the notion that romantic love is an inherent state of being, maintaining that it is instead a construct of Western culture, popularized and propagated in such a way that it has achieved the status of a universal in the eyes of many. Love for Solomon is not a universal, static quality, but an emotion, subject to the same vicissitudes as other emotions, like anger or sadness.

=== On business ethics ===
His book Ethics and Excellence renewed in business ethics — philosophers and managers alike — an interest in Aristotelian virtue ethics, which he explained so that it could be applied to management development and leadership training. This caused the misunderstanding with some authors (Crane/Matten, Business Ethics: A European Perspective) that virtue ethics was a modern approach, unaware of the roots in Aristotle.

He also wrote about business ethics in Above the Bottom Line, It’s Good Business, Ethics and Excellence, New World of Business and A Better Way to Think about Business. He had designed and provided programs for corporations and organizations around the world and his books have been translated into more than a dozen languages.

=== On the history of philosophy ===
A significant portion of Solomon's work focused on existentialism and phenomenology. He delved into the ideas of existentialist philosophers like Jean-Paul Sartre and phenomenologists like Martin Heidegger. His writings explored profound questions related to human existence, freedom, and personal responsibility.

He noted that the topic of the emotions was largely being ignored in Anglo-American analytic philosophy and social science, and also on the continent in the new scientism and structuralism when The Passions was written in 1976.

== Published works ==
- Above the Bottom Line (Cengage Learning, 1983)
- A Better Way to Think About Business: How Personal Integrity Leads to Corporate Success (Oxford, 1999)
- A Handbook for Ethics (Cengage Learning, 1993)
- A Passion For Justice (Rowman & Littlefield, 1995)
- A Passion for Wisdom: A Very Brief History of Philosophy (Oxford, 1990)
- Introducing Philosophy: A Text with Integrated Readings (Oxford, 1977)
- Solomon, Robert C. (1996). A short history of philosophy. Kathleen Marie Higgins. New York: Oxford University Press. ISBN 0-19-508647-3. OCLC 32396951.
- About Love: Reinventing Romance for Our Times (Simon & Schuster, 1988)
- Building Trust: In Business, Politics, Relationships, and Life (Oxford, 2001)
- Continental Philosophy Since 1750 (Oxford, 1988)
- Dark Feelings, Grim Thoughts: Experience and Reflection in Camus and Sartre (Oxford, 2006)
- Entertaining Ideas (Prometheus Books, 1970)
- Ethics and Excellence (Oxford, 1992)
- Ethics: A Short Introduction (Brown & Benchmark, 1993)
- Ethics and Excellence: Cooperation and Integrity in Business (Oxford, 1992)
- From Africa to Zen: An Invitation to World Philosophy (Rowman & Littlefield, 2003)
- From Hegel to Existentialism (Oxford, 1987)
- From Rationalism to Existentialism: The Existentialists and Their Nineteenth-century Backgrounds (Rowman & Littlefield, 2001)
- Existentialism (McGraw–Hill, 1974)
- "Graduate Study in Continental Philosophy in American Universities," Teaching Philosophy 1:2, 1975
- Solomon, Robert (1976). The Passions: Emotions and the Meaning of Life. Doubleday.
- Solomon, Robert (1993). "Preface to the Hackett Edition". The Passions: Emotions and the Meaning of Life (Revised, 2nd ed.). Hackett Publishing. ISBN 0872202267.
- Solomon, Robert (1993b). "Conclusion: Looking Ahead". The Passions: Emotions and the Meaning of Life (Revised, 2nd ed.). Hackett Publishing. ISBN 0872202267.
- "Teaching Hegel," Teaching Philosophy 2:3/4, 1977
- History and Human Nature: A Philosophical Review of European Philosophy and Culture, 1750–1850 (Harcourt Brace Janovich, 1979)
- In Defense of Sentimentality (Oxford, 2004)
- In the Spirit of Hegel (Oxford, 1983)
- Introducing Philosophy for Canadians: A Text with Integrative Readings (Oxford, 2011)
- Introducing philosophy: Problems and perspectives (Harcourt Brace Jovanovich, 1977)
- Introducing the Existentialists: Imaginary Interviews with Sartre, Heidegger, and Camus (Hackett Publishing Company, 1981)
- Introducing the German Idealists: Mock Interviews with Kant, Hegel and Others and a Letter from Schopenhauer (Hackett Publishing Company, 1981)
- It's Good Business: Ethics and Free Enterprise for the New Millennium (Rowman & Littlefield, 1997)
- Living with Nietzsche (Oxford, 2003)
- Love (Hackett Publishing Company, 2006)
- Morality and the Good Life: An Introduction to Ethics Through Classical Sources (McGraw-Hill, 1984)
- Not Passion's Slave: Emotions and Choice (Oxford, 2003)
- On Ethics and Living Well (Thomson Wadsworth, 2005)
- Phenomenology and Existentialism (Rowman & Littlefield, 2001)
- Philosophy of Religion: A Global Approach (Harcourt Brace College Publishers, 1996)
- Reading Nietzsche (Oxford, 1990)
- Sexual Paradigms (Rowman & Littlefield, 2002)
- Since Socrates: A Concise Source Book of Classic Readings (Cengage Learning, 2004)
- Spirituality for the Skeptic: The Thoughtful Love of Life (Oxford, 2002)
- Solomon, Robert C.; Sherman, David, eds. (2007). The Blackwell Guide to Continental Philosophy. Oxford: John Wiley & Sons. ISBN 978-1-4051-4304-2. OCLC 437147422.
- The Bully Culture: Enlightenment, Romanticism, and the Transcendental Pretense, 1750–1850(Littlefield Adams, 1992)
- The Big Questions: A Short Introduction to Philosophy (Wadsworth Publishing, 2002)
- The Joy of Philosophy (Oxford, 1999)
- The Little Philosophy Book (Oxford, 2007)
- The New World of Business: Ethics and Free Enterprise in the Global 1990s (Rowman & Littlefield Publishers, 1994)
- The Philosophy of (Erotic) Love, with Kathleen M. Higgins (University Press of Kansas, 1991)
- Thinking about Feeling: Contemporary Philosophers on Emotions (Oxford, 2004)
- True to Our Feelings: What Our Emotions Are Really Telling Us (Oxford, 2006)
- Up the University: Re-Creating Higher Education in America (Addison-Wesley Publishing Company, 1993)
- What Is An Emotion?: Classic and Contemporary Readings (Oxford, 2003)
- What Nietzsche Really Said (Random House/Schocken Books, 2000) (coauthored with Kathleen M. Higgins)
- Wicked Pleasures: Meditations on the 'Seven' Deadly Sins (Rowman & Littlefield, 2000)
- World Philosophy: A Text with Readings (McGraw-Hill, 1995)

== See also ==
- American philosophy
- Radical centrism
