= Philosophy education =

Practice of teaching philosophy

Philosophy education is the practice of teaching and learning philosophy along with the associated scholarly research. It is not philosophy of education, nor the philosophical study of education in general.

== Philosophy education around the world ==
Education in the subject is usually divided into 4 main stages: pre-school (i.e. pre-primary; e.g. kindergarten) and primary education levels (e.g. elementary school), lower (e.g. middle school) and upper secondary education level (e.g. high school), tertiary (higher) education level (e.g. college, university), and post-tertiary education level. Sometimes the stage referred to as "post-secondary non-tertiary" is also included (in a fashion similar to the ISCED levels). Not all countries provide study of philosophy at all levels and in many the subject is virtually absent from the entire curriculum.

=== English-speaking countries ===
In the United States of America, philosophy is not generally taught at the pre-college level. However, through the movements of critical thinking and Philosophy for Children aspects of philosophy teaching have entered the curriculum. In recent years, some in the media have promoted the idea of introducing philosophy to American schools as an antidote to perceived political and societal dysfunction. In Canada, philosophy is not generally taught in public schools prior to university. However, in some provinces, such as British Columbia, philosophy is taught as a social studies course at a twelfth grade level. In the United Kingdom it is possible to do A-levels in philosophy.

=== Continental Europe ===
In many other European countries philosophy is part of the high school curriculum, such as for example in Austria, Croatia, Bulgaria, France, Greece, Italy, Portugal, and mainly Spain. In Germany the subject ethics has been introduced in more and more parts since the 1970s. In Croatia the subject ethics can be taken instead of religious education which mainly focuses on Catholic tradition. Spain is the most clear example of a philosophy education. In Secondary school all the students must take a little introduction to ethics, but it is during the sixth form, known there as 'bachillerato', where it is compulsory to take philosophy and citizenship in the first course, as well as history of philosophy in the second course in order to apply for university or just to get the title. University-level philosophy courses are widespread and are usually thought to have the longest tradition in the subject due to the historical ascription for the invention of philosophy as a separate discipline to the philosophers of Ancient Greece.

=== Africa and the Middle East ===
Philosophy education has a long tradition in some of the Arab states. According to a UNESCO-led poll, philosophy is taught at secondary level in Algeria, Bahrain, Egypt, Kuwait, Lebanon, Morocco, Mauritania, Qatar, the Syrian Arab Republic, Tunisia and Yemen. In most Arab countries the subject is taught at university (higher education) level. However, there are exceptions, like Oman and Saudi Arabia, where philosophy is entirely absent at most educational levels.

=== Asia ===
Philosophy education is traditionally available in most of Asia since the continent gave birth to the schools of Eastern philosophy. The 20th and early 21st century saw the increased interest in the field (especially in Western philosophy) in the Asian continent, with India, China and especially South Korea and Japan as major contemporary academic and research hubs. However, broad regional and interstate differences apply.

=== Latin America ===
In Brazil, philosophy is part of the high school curriculum since 2008.

== Theoretical approaches to philosophy education ==
Theoretical questions concerning the teaching of philosophy in school have been debated at least since Immanuel Kant and Georg Wilhelm Friedrich Hegel. The modern debate in Germany in the 1970s gave rise to two competing approaches: the more traditional, text-oriented approach by Wulff D. Rehfus and the more modern, dialogue-oriented approach by Ekkehard Martens. Newer approaches have been developed by Karel van der Leeuw and Pieter Mostert as well as Roland W. Henke. A similar divide between traditionalists and modernists is to be found in France, with the proponents Jacques Muglioni and Jacqueline Russ on the one side and France Rollin and Michel Tozzi on the other. In Italy, philosophy education is traditionally historically oriented in the sense of history of ideas. Theoretical problems of philosophy education at college and university level are discussed in articles in the journal Teaching Philosophy.

== Didactic methods ==
Among the didactic methods in philosophy are the Socratic method and Hermeneutics. The pedagogic side of philosophy teaching is also of note to researchers in the field and philosophers of education.

== Organizations ==
- Collège international de philosophie
- PLATO (The Philosophy Learning and Teaching Organization)
- International Philosophy Olympiad

== Journals ==
- Teaching Philosophy
- American Philosophical Association Newsletter on Teaching
- Diotime Revue internationale de didactique de la philosophie
- Journal of Didactics of Philosophy

== Websites ==
- Wireless Philosophy
- 1000-Word Philosophy

== See also ==
- Socratic method
- World Philosophy Day
