= Gareth Matthews =

American philosopher

Gareth B. Matthews (July 8, 1929 – April 17, 2011) was an American philosopher who specialized in ancient philosophy, medieval philosophy, philosophy of childhood and philosophy for children.

== Biography ==
Gareth Matthews was born in Buenos Aires, Argentina, on July 8, 1929. He grew up near Memphis, Tennessee. As a Boy Scout, he earned the rank of Eagle Scout. Matthews moved with his family to Franklin, Indiana, in 1945. He was valedictorian of the Class of 1947, at Franklin High School. He went on to earn his A.B. at Franklin College (Indiana), where his father was a professor. Matthews began his graduate work at Harvard University, where he earned an A.M. in 1952. He spent a year as a Rotary Fellow at the Free University of Berlin.

Matthews served as an Intelligence officer in the United States Navy during the Cold War. He was assigned to the Naval Security Group and the National Security Agency. He later served in the reserves and retired as a lieutenant.

Matthews earned his Ph.D. from Harvard in 1961. His teaching appointments were at the University of Virginia (1960–61), the University of Minnesota (1961–69), and the University of Massachusetts Amherst (1969–2005). He was professor emeritus of Philosophy from his retirement in 2005 until his death.

Matthews was highly prolific. His ten books included six that he authored, two scholarly translations (one with S. Marc Cohen), and two edited collections (one with Susan Turner). He published over 140 journal articles and book chapters, as well as many encyclopedia articles and over 100 book reviews, including a series of fifty-eight on philosophical aspects of children's books in the journal Thinking: The Journal of Philosophy for Children, for which he was the Contributing Editor from 1979 to 2006. He also lectured widely (making scholarly and educational presentations on hundreds of occasions) and participated in many conferences and workshops.

His philosophical writings were remarkably wide-ranging, covering aspects of philosophy of language and logic, philosophy of religion, philosophy of mind and psychology, philosophy of life and death, philosophy of childhood and of education, a wide range of metaphysics, and metaphilosophy. He was well known as a scholar of ancient philosophy and medieval philosophy, with about a dozen publications each on Plato and Aristotle, and over twenty, including two books, on Augustine, along with several on other medieval thinkers, including Anselm (some co-authored with Lynne Rudder Baker), Ockham, and Aquinas.

Strong themes continued through many areas of publication throughout his career, including natural theology, the self (including death and immortality and the first-person perspective), philosophical method and the role of perplexity in philosophical inquiry, and above all, philosophy in relation to children. His works on philosophy for children and philosophy of childhood have been translated into over a dozen languages, including Chinese, German, Japanese, and Indonesian.

Matthews regularly taught undergraduate and graduate courses at UMass Amherst on ancient philosophy, medieval philosophy, existentialism, applied ethics, and various topics in metaphysics. He directed reading groups for graduate students on Wittgenstein's Philosophical Investigations and Heidegger's Being and Time.

Matthews was a visiting professor at Amherst College, Brown University, Mt. Holyoke College, Smith College, Tufts University, and the Harvard Summer School. He was a member of the Institute for Advanced Study in Princeton in 1986 and directed four summer seminars sponsored by the National Endowment for the Humanities. He was twice awarded a National Endowment for the Humanities Fellowship. He was awarded honorary doctorates by Franklin College (1985) and by Hamburg University (2007).

Matthews lectured regularly in the US and abroad and conducted philosophy discussions with elementary-school children in Austria, Australia, China, Israel, Germany, Japan, Norway, and Scotland, as well as in various schools in the U.S.

Prior to his death, he lived for many years with his wife, Mary, in Amherst, Massachusetts.

Matthews died of colon cancer on April 17, 2011, in Boston, Massachusetts.

== Bibliography ==
- Augustine (Blackwell, 2005)
- Augustine: On the Trinity - Books 8-15, ed. (Cambridge, 2002)
- Socratic Perplexity and the Nature of Philosophy (Oxford, 1999)
- The Philosophy of Childhood (Harvard, 1994)
- Thought's Ego in Augustine and Descartes (Cornell, 1992)
- Dialogues with Children (Harvard, 1984)
- Philosophy and the Young Child (Harvard, 1980)

== See also ==
- American philosophy
- List of American philosophers
