= Cégep de Granby =

Public college in Granby, Quebec

Coordinates: 45°23′57″N 72°43′48″W

- Type: Public CEGEP
- Established: 1968
- Academic affiliations: ACCC
- Students: 2800
- Undergraduates: pre-university students; technical, continuing education
- Location: Granby, Quebec, Canada
- Campus: Urban
- Colours: blue
- Sporting affiliations: CCAA, QSSF
- Website: www.cegepgranby.ca

The Cégep de Granby is part of Quebec's CEGEP public education system. It is located in the city of Granby. Almost 2800 students attend classes there full-time or part-time including continuing education.

== History ==
The college traces its origins to the merger of several institutions which became public ones in 1967, when the Quebec system of CEGEPs was created.

== Programs ==
The CEGEP offers two types of programs: pre-university and technical. The pre-university programs, which take two years to complete, cover the subject matters which roughly correspond to the additional year of high school given elsewhere in Canada in preparation for a chosen field in university. The technical programs, which take three-years to complete, applies to students who wish to pursue a skill trade. The Cégep currently offers 10 technical programs and 3 pre-university programs.

== See also ==
- List of colleges in Quebec
- Higher education in Quebec
