= American Association of Philosophy Teachers =

Non-profit professional organisation

American Association of Philosophy Teachers (AAPT) is a non-profit professional organization that supports the continuing professional development of philosophy teachers in North America. The association was established in 1976. AAPT publishes a newsletter, supports an online discussion forum, blogs, and the collection of teaching resources. Members also have online access to a fulltext collection of teaching related resources through the Philosophy Documentation Center.

== Meetings ==
Every two years, AAPT sponsors the International Workshop-Conference on Teaching Philosophy at a different location in the U.S. or Canada. These conferences are open to philosophy teachers at every level. AAPT also sponsors sessions at divisional meetings of the American Philosophical Association.
