= Adrian William Moore =

British philosopher and broadcaster (born 1956)

Adrian William Moore FBA
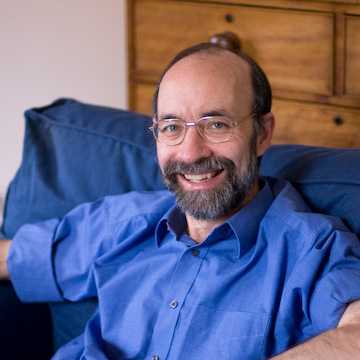
- A. W. Moore in 2007 (by Guy Burt)
- Born: 29 December 1956 (age 69); Kettering, England

Education
- Education: King's College, Cambridge, Balliol College, Oxford
- Thesis: Language, Time and Ontology (1981)
- Doctoral advisor: Michael Dummett

Philosophical work
- Era: Contemporary philosophy
- Region: Western philosophy
- School: Analytic philosophy
- Institutions: St Hugh's College, Oxford
- Main interests: Metaphysics
- Notable ideas: The infinite as a philosophical problem

Adrian William Moore (born 29 December 1956) is a British philosopher and broadcaster. He is an Emeritus Professor of Philosophy at the University of Oxford and an Emeritus Fellow of St Hugh's College, Oxford. His main areas of interest are Kant, Wittgenstein, history of philosophy, metaphysics, philosophy of mathematics, philosophy of logic and language, ethics and philosophy of religion.

== Early life and education ==
A. W. Moore was born in Kettering on 29 December 1956 to Victor George Moore and Audrey Elizabeth Moore. He was educated at Manchester Grammar School.

Moore graduated with a B.A. in philosophy from King's College, Cambridge, after which he went to Oxford, where he studied at Balliol College for his B.Phil. and D.Phil. in philosophy, completing the latter with a thesis on Language, Time and Ontology under the supervision of Michael Dummett. During his time as a postgraduate at Oxford, Moore was awarded the John Locke Prize in Mental Philosophy (in 1980).

== Academic career ==
After receiving his doctorate, Moore spent three years as a lecturer at University College, Oxford, where he also acted as the junior dean. He then returned to Cambridge as a junior research fellow at King's College. Since 1988 he has been a tutorial fellow at St Hugh's College, Oxford, and a university lecturer in philosophy. Since 2004, he has been a university professor of philosophy. He has also been the chairman of the Oxford University Philosophical Society (1995–96), chairman of the Sub-faculty of Philosophy (1997–99), president of the Aristotelian Society (2014–15) and vice-principal of St Hugh's College, Oxford (2017–20).

He was a delegate of the Oxford University Press from 2014 to 2024, and he was editor of the journal MIND from 2015 to 2025, jointly with Lucy O'Brien.

Moore was awarded the Mind Association Research Fellowship (1999–2000) and a Leverhulme Major Research Fellowship (2006–09).

In September 2016 he presented a ten-part BBC Radio 4 series titled A History of the Infinite.

In 2024 he was elected a Fellow of the British Academy.

In 2025 he launched a series of YouTube interviews with children about philosophy.

== Philosophical work ==
One of Moore's distinctive contributions to the area of contemporary metaphysics is a bold defence of the idea that it is possible to think about the world 'from no point of view'. This defence is presented in his book Points of View, which is at the same time a study of ineffability and nonsense. Drawing on Kant and Wittgenstein, he considers transcendental idealism, which, he argues, is nonsense resulting from the attempt to express certain inexpressible insights. He applies this idea to a wide range of fundamental philosophical issues, including the nature of persons, value, and God.

Moore's most recent work has been devoted to thorough study of the history of metaphysics since Descartes, published under the title The Evolution of Modern Metaphysics: Making Sense of Things. Taking as its definition of metaphysics ‘the most general attempt to make sense of things’, the study charts the evolution of metaphysics through various competing conceptions of its possibility, scope and limits: it deals with the early modern period, the late modern period in the analytic tradition, and the late modern period in non-analytic traditions. Moore challenges the still prevalent conviction that there is some unbridgeable gulf between analytic philosophy and philosophy of other kinds. He also advances his own distinctive conception of what metaphysics is and why it matters.

Moore is well known not only for his work in the areas or metaphysics and history of philosophy, but also for his contributions to the philosophy of logic and the philosophy of mathematics. In particular, he has done much work on the nature of infinity. In his book The Infinite, Moore offers a thorough discussion of the idea of infinity and its history, and a defence of finitism. He engages with a wide range of approaches and issues in the history of thought about the infinite, including various paradoxes, as well as the problems of human finitude and death. In the closing chapter, he writes, "The focus of this chapter is human finitude, human finitude having been, in its own way, the focus of the whole enquiry."

In the areas of ethics and religious philosophy, one of the main questions Moore addresses is: Can ethical thinking to be grounded in pure reason? In Noble in Reason, Infinite in Faculty: Themes and Variations in Kant's Moral and Religious Philosophy, Moore uses Kant's moral and religious philosophy to arrive at a distinctive way of understanding and answering this question. He identifies three Kantian themes—morality, freedom and religion—and offers variations on each. He concedes that there are difficulties with the Kantian view that morality can be governed by ‘pure’ reason, but defends a closely related view involving a culturally and socially conditioned notion of reason.

Two collections of some of Moore's essays have been published by Oxford University Press, one under the title Language, World, and Limits: Essays in Philosophy of Language and Metaphysics and the other under title The Human A Priori: Essays on How We Make Sense in Philosophy, Ethics, and Mathematics. And in 2022 Oxford University Press also published his Gödel’s Theorem: A Very Short Introduction.

Moore also has a special interest in the work of Bernard Williams, his colleague at Cambridge, about whom he has written extensively. After Williams’ death in 2003 Moore was appointed as one of his literary executors. He edited one of Williams’ posthumously published collections of essays, Philosophy as a Humanistic Discipline.

== Reception of work ==
Described as "one of our very best... contemporary philosophers", Moore published his first book, The Infinite, with Routledge in 1990. It was considered "an instructive and authoritative overview of a topic of considerable philosophical importance", a "fine book... admirably clear... [subtle and] sensitive to the philosophical issues." According to another reviewer, the book "points to deep and unresolved issues in the philosophy of mathematics and even deeper issues in general philosophy... deserves serious study by both mathematicians and philosophers". In Choice, it was described as "a splendid guide through the intellectual history of this powerful and far-reaching idea... very highly recommended for all readers". The book was also reviewed favourably in International Philosophical Quarterly and Times Higher Education Supplement.

This was followed by Points of View (Oxford University Press 1997): "a superb book. It brings the rigour, clarity and precision of the best analytical philosophy to bear on a topic that has until now been of pointedly little concern within analytical philosophy." In his review, in The Times Literary Supplement, Robert Brandom called it "imaginative, original and ambitious". According to The European Journal of Philosophy review, the book "tackles some of the most profound and most complex issues in philosophy, and the result is impressive."

Moore's third book, Noble in Reason, Infinite in Faculty: Themes and Variations in Kant's Moral and Religious Philosophy was reviewed very laudatorily in, among others, Mind, The Times Literary Supplement and Kantian Review: "a continuing, deep and detailed discussion with... Kant... an exceptionally thought-provoking and serious book"; a "particularly helpful account of Kant's philosophy of religion", including "numerous provocative insights".

Moore has also received accolades for his work as editor, in particular for Bernard Williams's Philosophy as a Humanistic Discipline: "Editor A. W. Moore... has certainly done the scholarly world a service" (Choice; "this superb collection of essays further demonstrates Williams's greatness... it appropriately honours his philosophical legacy by offering essays that span his entire career" (The Philosophers' Magazine); "we can only be thankful that collections such as this allow discussion with [Williams] to continue".

His monograph The Evolution of Modern Metaphysics: Making Sense of Things was published in 2012 by Cambridge University Press, and has been called an “important and remarkable book... Everyone interested in metaphysics... ought to read the whole book.” The book has been said to evince "the highest qualities of a historian of philosophy... [It] is positively thrilling to see someone engage with thinkers from both [analytic and continental] traditions and bring them into conversation with each other, especially with such dexterity... an extremely impressive achievement... largely succeeds at its dauntingly difficult task". In his review of it, John Cottingham writes: "[Moore articulates his story with] extraordinary care and detail... pulls off his [ambitious programme] with a remarkable degree of success... locates his chosen philosophers within a beautifully organised narrative... The fact that fundamental ethical questions... can be raised as a result of Moore's story... is tribute to the brilliance and importance of this book... It is a tribute to the author that [the ideas and systems] are handled with such crystal clarity and with an unpretentious and unassuming seriousness... a kind of model for philosophy at its synoptic best... restores one's faith in the future of the subject". Equally positive reviews were published in Choice, The Philosophical Quarterly, The Times Literary Supplement, Mind and Analysis and Metaphysics.

== Publications ==
=== Books ===
- 1990 The Infinite (London: Routledge). A revised second edition, with a new preface, was published in 2001. A revised third edition with two new chapters and a new appendix was published in 2019.
- 1997 Points of View (Oxford: Oxford University Press)
- 2003 Noble in Reason, Infinite in Faculty: Themes and Variations in Kant's Moral and Religious Philosophy (London: Routledge)
- 2012 The Evolution of Modern Metaphysics: Making Sense of Things (Cambridge: Cambridge University Press)
- 2019 Language, World and Limits: Essays in Philosophy of Language and Metaphysics (Oxford: Oxford University Press).
- 2022 Gödel´s Theorem: A Very Short Introduction (Oxford: Oxford University Press).
- 2023 The Human A Priori: Essays on How to Make Sense in Philosophy, Ethics, and Mathematics (Oxford: Oxford University Press).

=== Edited anthologies ===
- 1993 (ed.) Meaning and Reference (Oxford: Oxford University Press)
- 1993 (ed.) Infinity (Aldershot: Dartmouth)
- 2006 (ed.) Bernard Williams, Philosophy as a Humanistic Discipline (Princeton: Princeton University Press)
- 2012 (co-ed.) Contemporary Kantian Metaphysics: New Essays on Space and Time (Basingstoke: Macmillan)
