= Lucy O'Brien (philosopher) =

British philosopher (born 1964)

Lucy O'Brien FBA
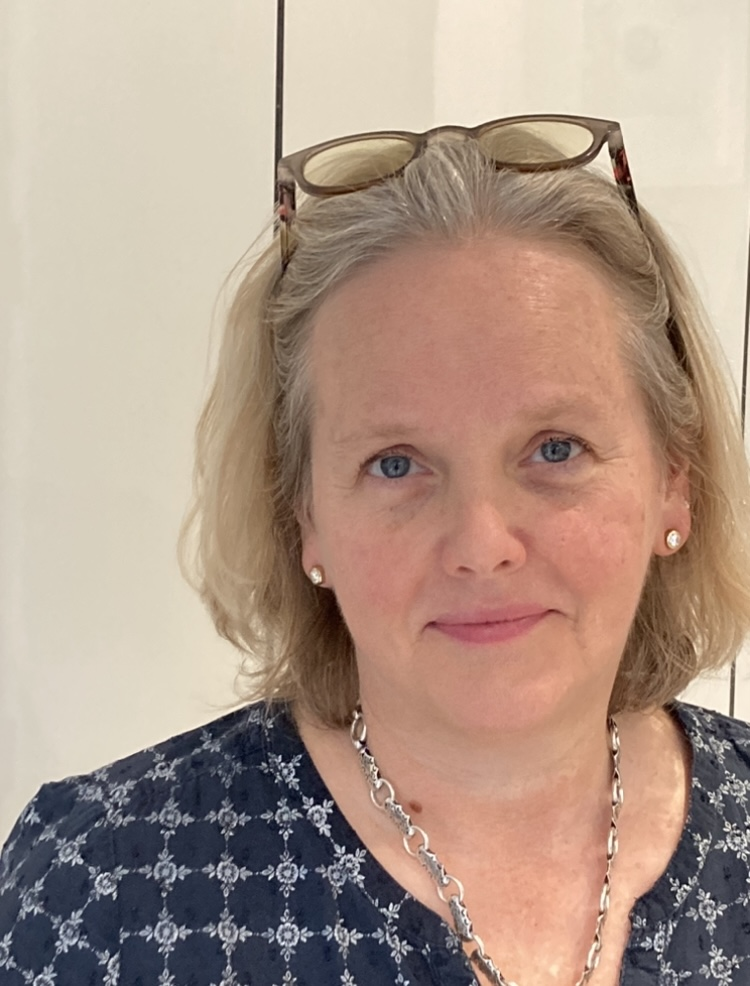
- Born: 1964 (age 61–62)
- Spouse: Mark Sacks (m. 1992; died 2008)

Education
- Education: University of Sheffield; University of Oxford

Lucy O'Brien FBA (born 1964) is a British philosopher and the Richard Wollheim Professor of Philosophy at University College London.

O'Brien predominantly works in the philosophy of mind and action, focusing in particular on self-consciousness and self-knowledge. She is the author of Self-Knowing Agents (OUP 2007) and co-editor, with Matthew Soteriou, of Mental Actions (OUP 2009).

O'Brien has co-edited the philosophical journal Mind with A. W. Moore since September 2015. She is the first female editor of the periodical in its 140-year history. She was elected chair of trustees of The Royal Institute of Philosophy in 2020 and was recipient of a Humboldt Research Award in 2022. She was elected a Fellow of the British Academy in 2024.
