= Mark Sainsbury (philosopher) =

British philosopher (born 1943)

Mark Sainsbury FBA
- Born: Richard Mark Sainsbury; 7 February 1943 (age 83)

Education
- Education: Oxford University (D.Phil.)

Philosophical work
- Era: Contemporary philosophy
- Region: Western philosophy
- School: Analytic
- Institutions: King's College London; University of Texas, Austin
- Main interests: Philosophy of language, philosophical logic, philosophy of mind, metaphysics
- Notable ideas: Originalist theory of concepts

Richard Mark Sainsbury (/ˈseɪnzbəri/; born 7 February 1943) is a British philosopher who is Professor of Philosophy at the University of Texas, Austin. He is known for his work in philosophical logic, philosophy of language, and on the philosophies of Bertrand Russell and Gottlob Frege.

== Education and career ==
Sainsbury earned his D.Phil. at Oxford University and taught for many years at King's College London where he was Susan Stebbing Professor of Philosophy. He became professor of philosophy at the University of Texas at Austin in 2002. He was editor of the leading philosophy journal Mind from 1990 to 2000. He was elected a Fellow of the British Academy in 1998.

== Books ==
- Bertrand Russell (Routledge, 1979) ("Arguments of the Philosophers" series).
- Paradoxes (Cambridge University Press, 1988).
- Reference Without Referents (Oxford University Press, 2005).
- Fiction and Fictionalism (Routledge, 2009).
- Seven Puzzles of Thought and How to Solve Them: An Originalist Theory of Concepts (with Michael Tye) (Oxford University Press, 2012).
- Thinking About Things (Oxford University Press, 2018) ISBN 9780198803348.
