= Mind (journal) =

- Discipline: Philosophy
- Language: English
- Edited by: Adrian William Moore; Lucy O'Brien

Publication details
- History: 1876–present
- Publisher: Oxford University Press on behalf of the Mind Association (United Kingdom)
- Frequency: Quarterly

Standard abbreviations
- ISO 4: Mind

Indexing
- ISSN: 0026-4423 (print); 1460-2113 (web)
- LCCN: sn98-23315
- JSTOR: 00264423
- OCLC no.: 40463594

Links
- Journal homepage; Online access; Online archive

Mind (stylized as MIND) is a quarterly peer-reviewed academic journal published by Oxford University Press on behalf of the Mind Association. Having previously published exclusively philosophy in the analytic tradition, it now "aims to take quality to be the sole criterion of publication, with no area of philosophy, no style of philosophy, and no school of philosophy excluded." Its institutional home is shared between the University of Oxford and University College London. It is considered an important resource for studying philosophy.

== History and profile ==
The journal was established in 1876 by the Scottish philosopher Alexander Bain (University of Aberdeen) with his colleague and former student George Croom Robertson (University College London) as editor-in-chief. With the death of Robertson in 1891, George Stout took over the editorship and began a 'New Series'. Early on, the journal was dedicated to the question of whether psychology could be a legitimate natural science. In the first issue, Robertson wrote:

Now, if there were a journal that set itself to record all advances in psychology, and gave encouragement to special researches by its readiness to publish them, the uncertainty hanging over the subject could hardly fail to be dispelled. Either psychology would in time pass with general consent into the company of the sciences, or the hollowness of its pretensions would be plainly revealed. Nothing less, in fact, is aimed at in the publication of Mind than to procure a decision of this question as to the scientific standing of psychology.

Throughout the 20th century, the journal was leading in the publishing of analytic philosophy. In 2015, under the auspices of its new editors-in-chief Lucy O'Brien (University College London) and Adrian William Moore (University of Oxford), it started accepting papers from all styles and schools of philosophy.

Many famous essays have been published in Mind by such figures as Charles Darwin, J. M. E. McTaggart and Noam Chomsky. Three of the most famous, arguably, are Lewis Carroll's "What the Tortoise Said to Achilles" (1895), Bertrand Russell's "On Denoting" (1905), and Alan Turing's "Computing Machinery and Intelligence" (1950), in which he first proposed the Turing test.

== Editors-in-chief ==
The following persons have been editors-in-chief:

- 1876–1891: George Croom Robertson
- 1891–1920: George Frederic Stout
- 1921–1947: George Edward Moore
- 1947–1972: Gilbert Ryle
- 1972–1984: David Hamlyn
- 1984–1990: Simon Blackburn
- 1990–2000: Mark Sainsbury
- 2000–2005: M. G. F. Martin
- 2005–2015: Thomas Baldwin
- 2015–2025: Adrian William Moore and Lucy O'Brien
- 2025–present: Tim Button and James Wilson

== Notable articles ==
=== Late 19th century ===
- "A Biographical Sketch of an Infant" (1877) – Charles Darwin
- "What is an Emotion?" (1884) – William James
- "What the Tortoise Said to Achilles" (1895) – Lewis Carroll

=== Early 20th century ===
- "The Refutation of Idealism" (1903) – G. E. Moore
- "On Denoting" (1905) – Bertrand Russell
- "The Unreality of Time" (1908) – J. M. E. McTaggart
- "Does Moral Philosophy Rest on a Mistake?" (1912) – H. A. Prichard

=== Mid 20th century ===
- "The Emotive Meaning of Ethical Terms" (1937) – Charles Leslie Stevenson
- "Studies in the Logic of Confirmation" (1945) – Carl G. Hempel
- "The Contrary-to-Fact Conditional" (1946) – Roderick M. Chisholm
- "Computing Machinery and Intelligence" (1950) – Alan Turing
- "On Referring" (1950) – P. F. Strawson (online)
- "Deontic Logic" (1951) – G. H. von Wright
- "The Identity of Indiscernibles" (1952) – Max Black
- "Evil and Omnipotence" (1955) – J. L. Mackie
- "Proper Names" (1958) – John Searle

=== Late 20th century ===
- "On the Sense and Reference of a Proper Name" (1977) – John McDowell
- "Fodor's Guide to Mental Representation" (1985) – Jerry Fodor
- "The Humean Theory of Motivation" (1987) – Michael Smith
- "Can We Solve the Mind–Body Problem?" (1989) – Colin McGinn
- "Conscious Experience" (1993) – Fred Dretske
- "Language and Nature" (1995) – Noam Chomsky

== See also ==
- List of philosophy journals
  - The Monist
