= Mind Association =

The Mind Association is a philosophical society whose purpose is to promote the study of philosophy. The association publishes the journal Mind quarterly.

It was established in 1900 on the death of Henry Sidgwick, who had supported Mind financially since 1891 and had suggested that after his death the society should be formed to oversee the journal.
