= Late modern period =

Period from 1800 CE until the present

- c. 1800 – c. 1945
| Early modern period | Contemporary period |
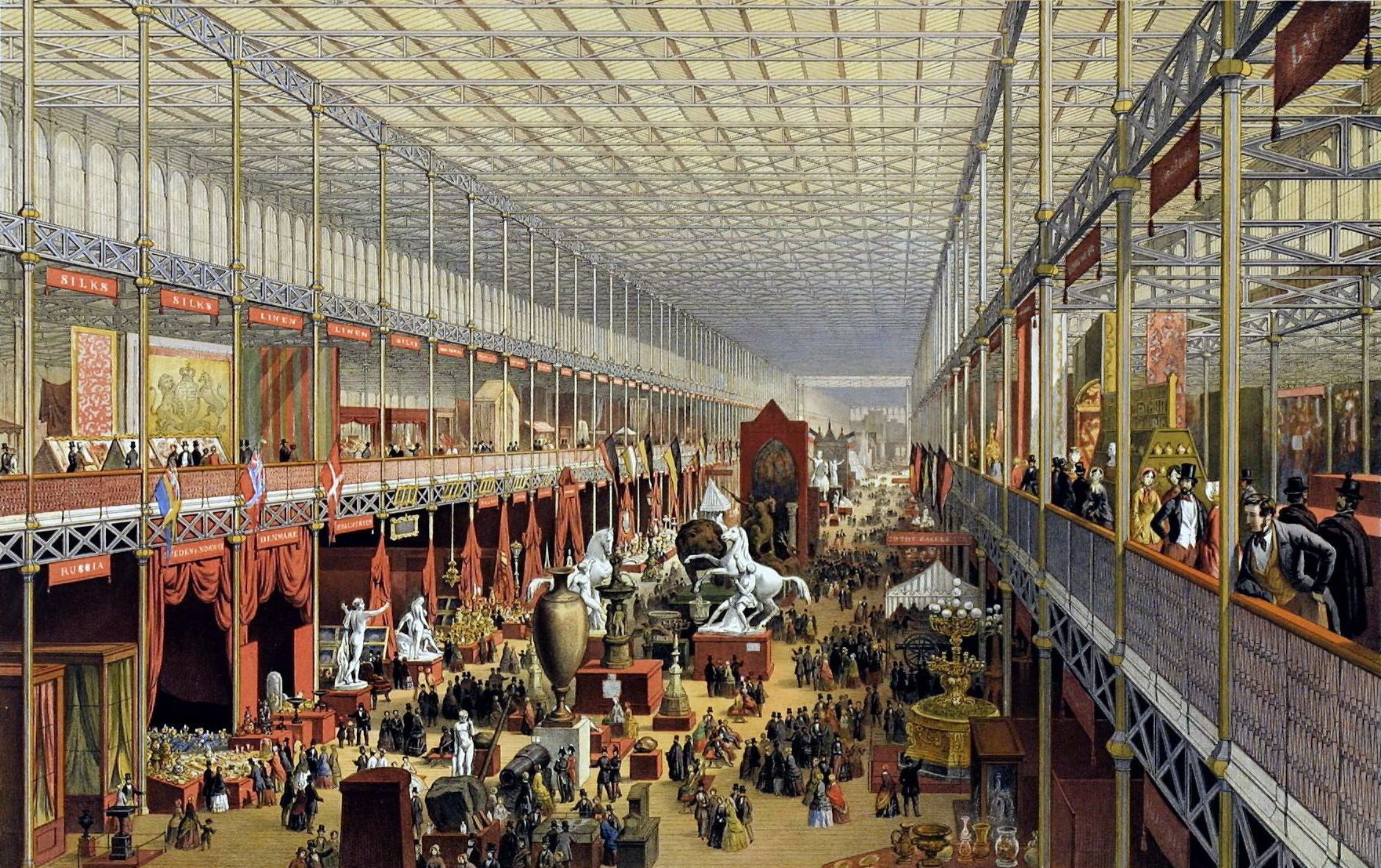
- Interior of the Crystal Palace, often used as a symbol for the Industrial Revolution itself, lithograph by J. McNeven (1851)
- Location: Worldwide
- Key events: French Revolution; Industrial Revolution; Meiji Restoration; Qing dynasty New Imperialism; First and Second World Wars

In many periodizations of human history, the late modern period followed the early modern period. It began in 1789 with the start of the French Revolution and, depending on the author, either ended with the beginning of contemporary history in 1945 with the end of World War II, or includes the contemporary history period to the present day.

Notable historical events in the late 18th century, that marked the transition from the early modern period to the late modern period, include: the American Revolution (1765–1791), French Revolution (1789–1799), and beginning of the Industrial Revolution around 1760.

== Definition ==
=== Possible end of the late modern period ===
There are differing approaches to defining a possible end or conclusion to the Late Modern period, or indeed whether it might be considered to have concluded at all. If that period is indeed concluded, then there are various options for how to label the subsequent era, i.e. the current contemporary era, as described below.

- The Information Age is a historical period that began in the mid-20th century, characterized by a rapid epochal shift from traditional industry established by the Industrial Revolution to an economy primarily based upon information technology.
- Some researchers typify the end of the Late Modern period by the concerns for the environment which began in 1950, as this marks the end of modern confidence about humanity's domination of the natural world.
- The Postmodern era is the economic or cultural state or condition of society which is said to exist after modernity. (Note: In this context, "modern" is not used in the sense of "contemporary", but as a name for a specific period in history.) Some schools of thought hold that modernity ended in the late 20th century – in the 1980s or early 1990s – and that it was replaced by postmodernity, and still others would extend modernity to cover the developments denoted by postmodernity, while some believe that modernity ended sometime after World War II. The idea of the post-modern condition is sometimes characterized as a culture stripped of its capacity to function in any linear or autonomous state, such as e.g. regressive isolationism, as opposed to the progressive mind state of modernism.

Postmodernism is an intellectual stance or mode of discourse defined by an attitude of skepticism toward what it describes as the grand narratives and ideologies of modernism. It questions or criticizes viewpoints associated with Enlightenment rationality dating back to the 17th century.

- The Post-industrial society is the stage of society's development when the service sector generates more wealth than the manufacturing sector of the economy. The term was originated by Alain Touraine and is closely related to similar sociological theoretical concepts such as post-Fordism, information society, knowledge economy, post-industrial economy, liquid modernity, and network society. They all can be used in economics or social science disciplines as a general theoretical backdrop in research design. As the term has been used, a few common themes have begun to emerge. Firstly, the economy undergoes a transition from the production of goods to the provision of services; also, producing ideas is the main way to grow the economy. The term is used by various researchers and social scientists.

=== Possible subdivisions ===
Additionally, the Late Modern period has been divided into various smaller periods; there are differing opinions and approaches on which time periods to assert in doing so.

- Cold War era. The Cold War was a period of geopolitical tension between the United States and the Soviet Union and their respective allies, the Western Bloc and the Eastern Bloc, which began following World War II. Historians do not fully agree on its starting and ending points, but the period is generally considered to span the 1947 Truman Doctrine (March 12, 1947) to the 1991 Dissolution of the Soviet Union (December 26, 1991).
- The Digital Revolution (also known as the Third Industrial Revolution) is the shift from mechanical and analogue electronic technology to digital electronics which began in the latter half of the 20th century, with the adoption and proliferation of digital computers and digital record-keeping, that continues to the present day. Central to this revolution is the mass production and widespread use of digital logic, MOSFETs (MOS transistors), integrated circuit (IC) chips, and their derived technologies, including computers, microprocessors, digital cellular phones, and the Internet. These technological innovations have transformed traditional production and business techniques.

== Industrial revolutions ==
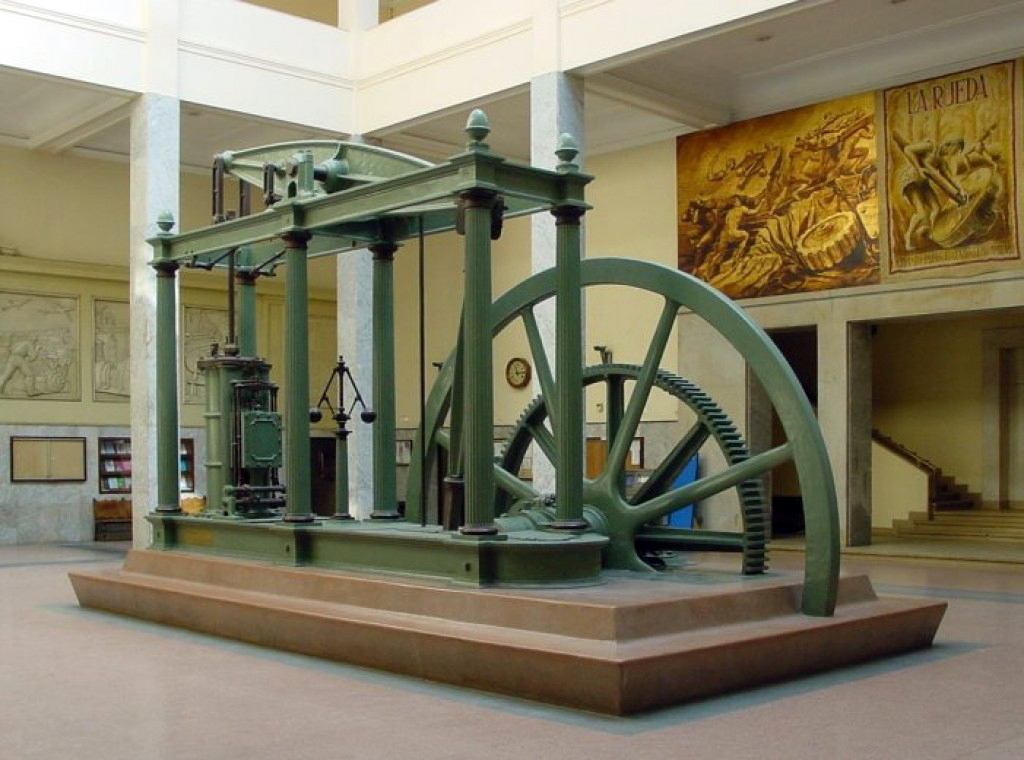
James Watt's steam engine

The development of the steam engine started the Industrial Revolution in Great Britain. The steam engine was created to pump water from coal mines, enabling them to be deepened beyond groundwater levels. The date of the Industrial Revolution is not exact, but some studies suggest it occurred after the East India Company's conquests of Mughal Bengal, Kingdom of Mysore and the rest of India, which were already observing the proto-industrialization. Eric Hobsbawm held that it "broke out" between 1789 and 1848, while T.S. Ashton held that it occurred roughly between 1760 and 1830 (in effect the reigns of George III, The Regency, and George IV).

== 19th century ==
Historians define the 19th-century historical era as stretching from 1815 (the Congress of Vienna) to 1914 (the outbreak of the First World War). Alternatively, Eric Hobsbawm defined the "long nineteenth century" as spanning the years 1789 to 1914.

=== European imperialism and empires ===
Montage of paintings that depict European wars of imperialism. By clockwise, wars include French Algerian War, Opium War, Russian conquest of Central Asia and Zulu War

In the 1800s and early 1900s, the great and powerful Spanish, Portuguese, Ottoman, and Mughal Empires began to break apart. Spain, which was at one time unrivaled in Europe, had been declining for a long time when it was crippled by Napoleon Bonaparte's invasion.

The Ottoman Empire was wracked with a series of revolutions, resulting with the Ottoman's only holding a small region that surrounded the capital, Istanbul.

The Mughal Empire, which was descended from the Mongol Khanate, was bested by the upcoming Maratha Confederacy. All was going well for the Marathas until the British took an interest in the riches of India and the British ended up ruling not just the boundaries of Modern India, but also Pakistan, Burma, Nepal, Bangladesh and some Southern Regions of Afghanistan.

Portugal's vast territory of Brazil reformed into the independent Empire of Brazil. With the defeat of Napoleonic France, Britain became undoubtedly the most powerful country in the world, and by the end of the First World War controlled a Quarter of the world's population and a third of its surface. However, the power of the British Empire did not end on land, since it had the greatest navy on the planet. Electricity, steel, and petroleum enabled Germany to become a great international power that raced to create empires of its own.

Substantial decolonization of the Americas occurred through various revolutions and wars of independence fought by new countries in the Americas against European colonizers in late 18th and early-to-mid-19th centuries. The Spanish American wars of independence lasted from 1808 until 1829, directly related to the Napoleonic French invasion of Spain. The conflict started with short-lived governing juntas established in Chuquisaca and Quito opposing the composition of the Supreme Central Junta of Seville. When the Central Junta fell to the French, numerous new Juntas appeared all across the Americas, eventually resulting in a chain of newly independent countries stretching from Argentina and Chile in the south, to Mexico in the north. After the death of the king Ferdinand VII, in 1833, only Cuba and Puerto Rico remained under Spanish rule, until the Spanish–American War in 1898. Unlike the Spanish, the Portuguese did not divide their colonial territory in America. The captaincies they created were subdued to a centralized administration in Salvador (later relocated to Rio de Janeiro) which reported directly to the Portuguese Crown until its independence in 1822, becoming the Empire of Brazil.

The Meiji Restoration was a chain of events that led to enormous changes in Japan's political and social structure that was taking a firm hold at the beginning of the Meiji era which coincided the opening of Japan by the arrival of the Black Ships of Commodore Matthew Perry and made Imperial Japan a great power. Russia and Qing China failed to keep pace with the other world powers which led to massive social unrest in both empires. The Qing Dynasty's military power weakened during the 19th century, and faced with international pressure, massive rebellions and defeats in wars, the dynasty declined after the mid-19th century.

European powers controlled parts of Oceania, with French New Caledonia from 1853 and French Polynesia from 1889; the Germans established colonies in New Guinea in 1884, and Samoa in 1900. The United States expanded into the Pacific with Hawaii becoming a U.S. territory from 1898. Disagreements between the US, Germany and UK over Samoa led to the Tripartite Convention of 1899.

Decolonization of the Americas
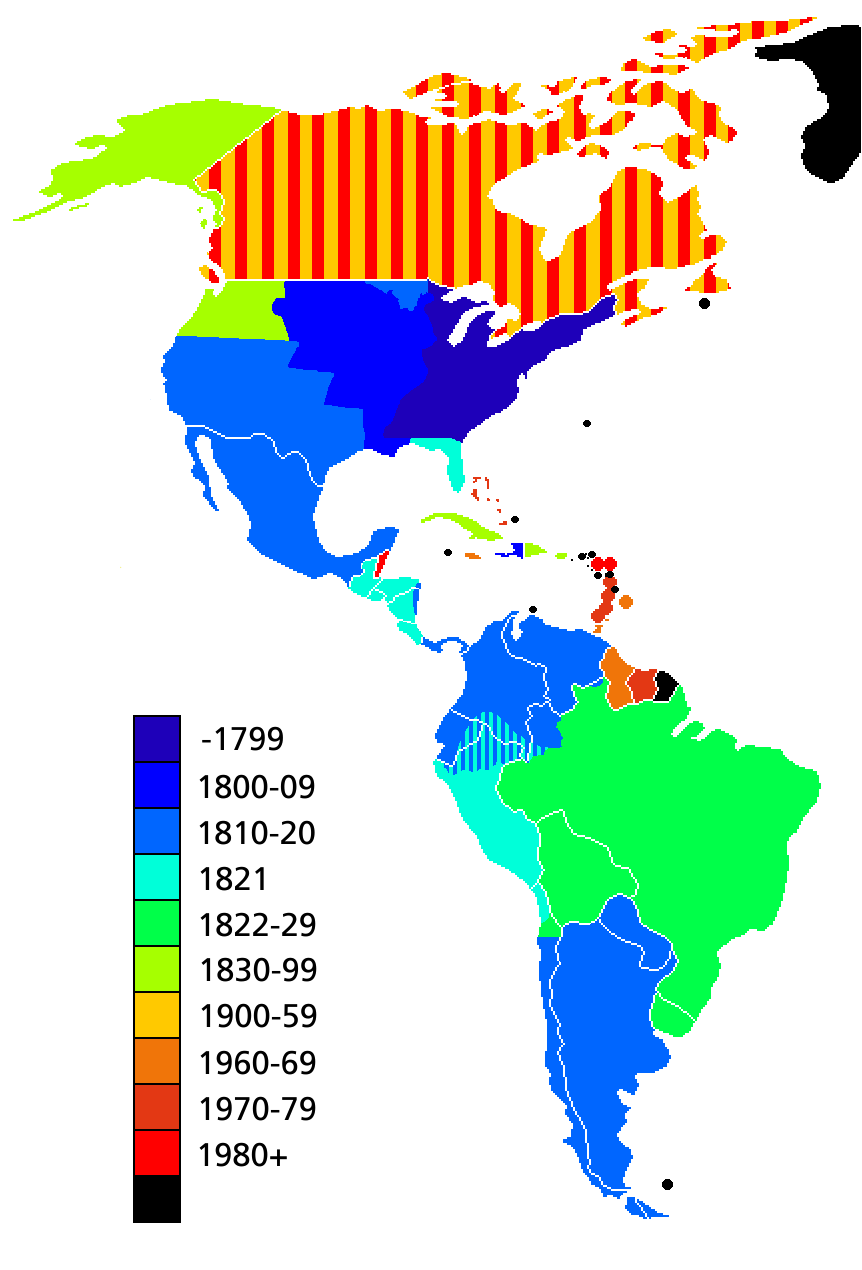
Countries in the Americas by date of independence. Note that the United States did not complete its continental territorial expansion until 1867

Development of Spanish American Independence

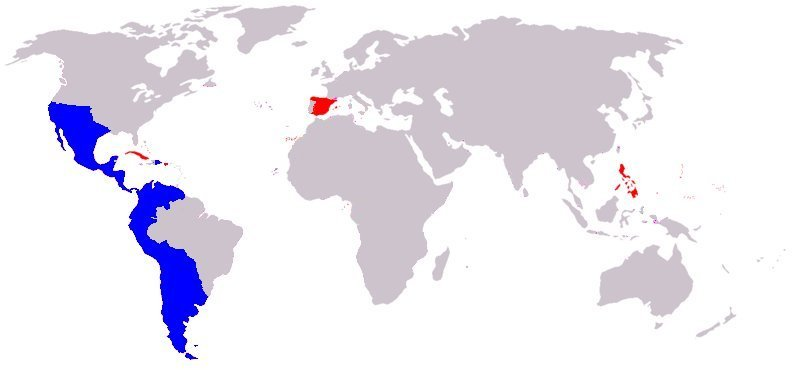
Map of territories that became independent during those wars (blue).

=== British Victorian era ===
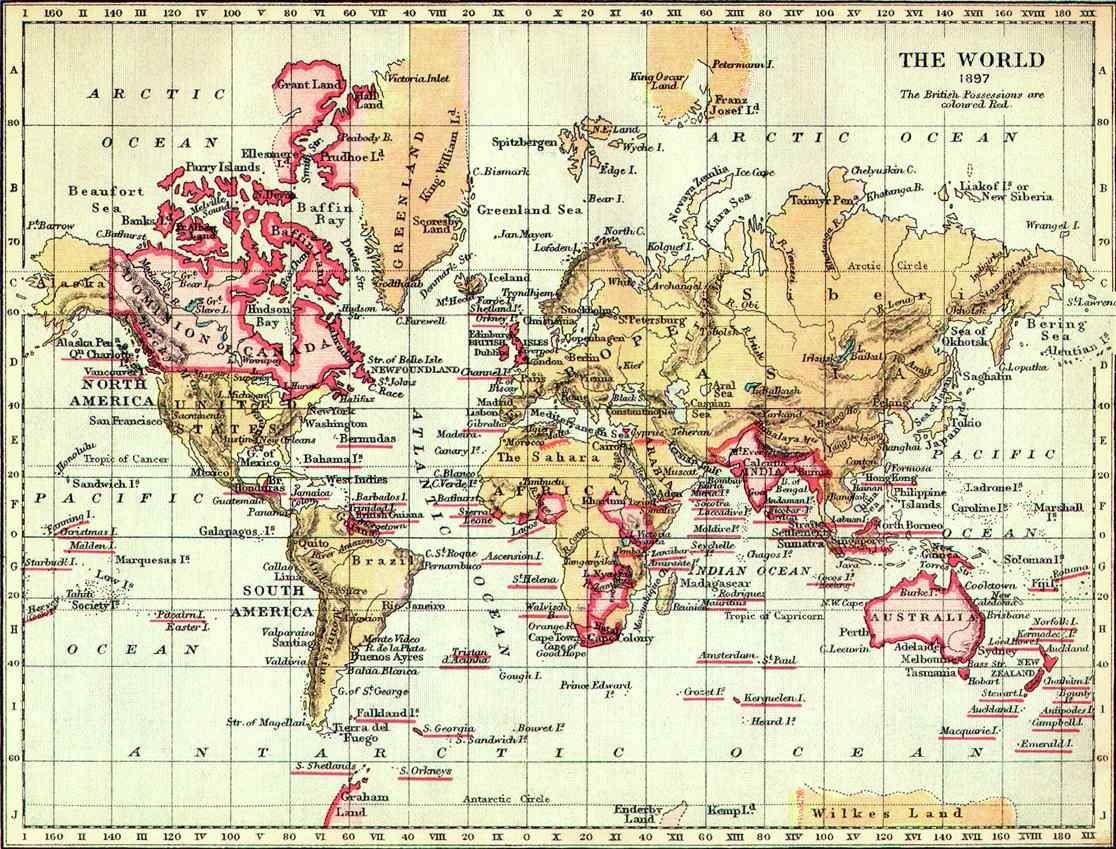
The British Empire in 1897, marked in the traditional colour for imperial British dominions on maps

The Victorian era of the United Kingdom was the period of Queen Victoria's reign from June 1837 to January 1901. This was a long period of prosperity for the British people, as profits gained from the overseas British Empire, as well as from industrial improvements at home, allowed a large, educated middle class to develop. Some scholars would extend the beginning of the period—as defined by a variety of sensibilities and political games that have come to be associated with the Victorians—back five years to the passage of the Reform Act 1832.

In Britain's "imperial century", (Note: For more, see Pax Britannica.) victory over Napoleon left Britain without any serious international rival, other than Russia in central Asia. Unchallenged at sea, Britain adopted the role of global policeman, a state of affairs later known as the Pax Britannica, and a foreign policy of "splendid isolation". Alongside the formal control it exerted over its own colonies, Britain's dominant position in world trade meant that it effectively controlled the economies of many nominally independent countries, such as China, Argentina and Siam, which has been generally characterized as "informal empire". Of note during this time was the Anglo-Zulu War, which was fought in 1879 between the British Empire and the Zulu Empire.

British imperial strength was underpinned by the steamship and the telegraph, new technologies invented in the second half of the 19th century, allowing it to control and defend the Empire. By 1902, the British Empire was linked together by a network of telegraph cables, the so-called All Red Line. Growing until 1922, around 13,000,000 square miles (34,000,000 km^{2}) of territory and roughly 458 million people were added to the British Empire. The British established colonies in Australia in 1788, New Zealand in 1840 and Fiji in 1872, with much of Oceania becoming part of the British Empire.

=== French governments and conflicts ===
The Bourbon Restoration followed the ousting of Napoleon I of France in 1814. The Allies restored the Bourbon Dynasty to the French throne. The ensuing period is called the Restoration, following French usage, and is characterized by a sharp conservative reaction and the re-establishment of the Roman Catholic Church as a power in French politics. The July Monarchy was a period of liberal constitutional monarchy in France under King Louis-Philippe starting with the July Revolution (or Three Glorious Days) of 1830 and ending with the Revolution of 1848. The Second Empire was the Imperial Bonapartist regime of Napoleon III from 1852 to 1870, between the Second Republic and the Third Republic, in France.

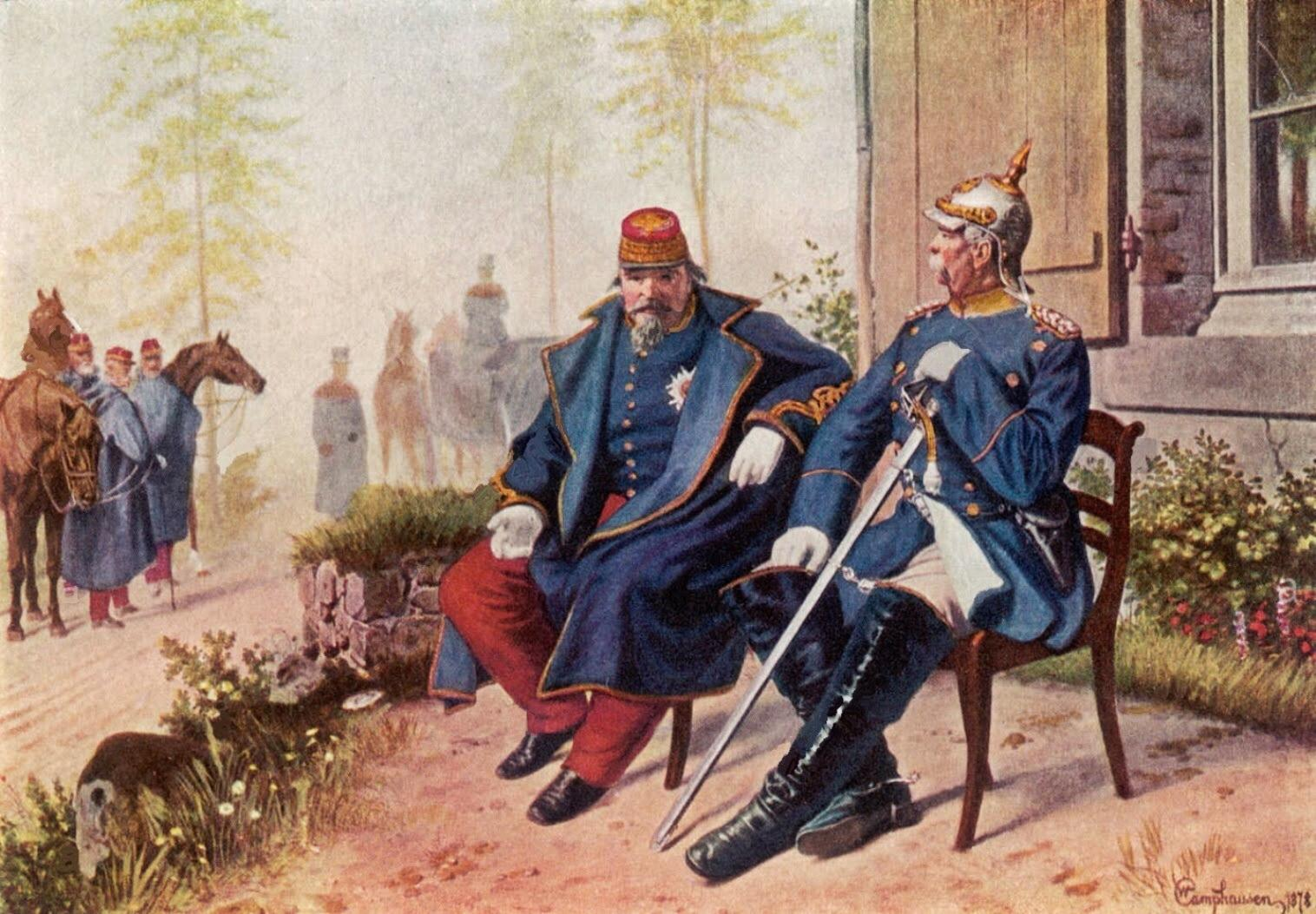
Napoleon III and Bismarck after the Battle of Sedan

The Franco-Prussian War was a conflict between France and Prussia, while Prussia was backed up by the North German Confederation, of which it was a member, and the South German states of Baden, Württemberg and Bavaria. The complete Prussian and German victory brought about the final unification of Germany under King Wilhelm I of Prussia. It also marked the downfall of Napoleon III and the end of the Second French Empire, which was replaced by the Third Republic. As part of the settlement, almost all of the territory of Alsace-Lorraine was taken by Prussia to become a part of Germany, which it would retain until the end of World War I.

The French Third Republic was the republican government of France between the end of the Second French Empire following the defeat of Louis-Napoléon in the Franco-Prussian war in 1870 and the Vichy Regime after the invasion of France by the German Third Reich in 1940. The Third Republic endured seventy years, making it the most long-lasting regime in France since the collapse of the Ancien Régime in the French Revolution of 1789.

=== Italian unification ===
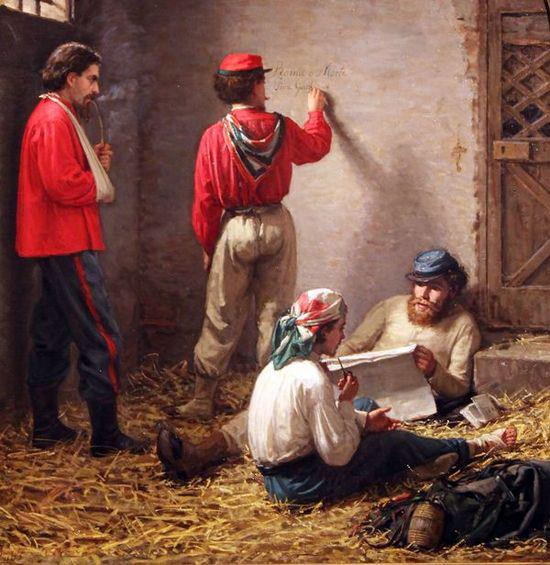
Rome or Death, Italian patriotic painting by Gioacchino Toma, 1863

Italian unification was the political and social movement that annexed different states of the Italian Peninsula into the single state of Italy in the 19th century. There is a lack of consensus on the exact dates for the beginning and the end of this period, but many scholars agree that the process began with the end of Napoleonic rule and the Congress of Vienna in 1815, and approximately ended with the Franco-Prussian War in 1871, though the last città irredente did not join the Kingdom of Italy until after World War I.

=== Slavery and abolition ===
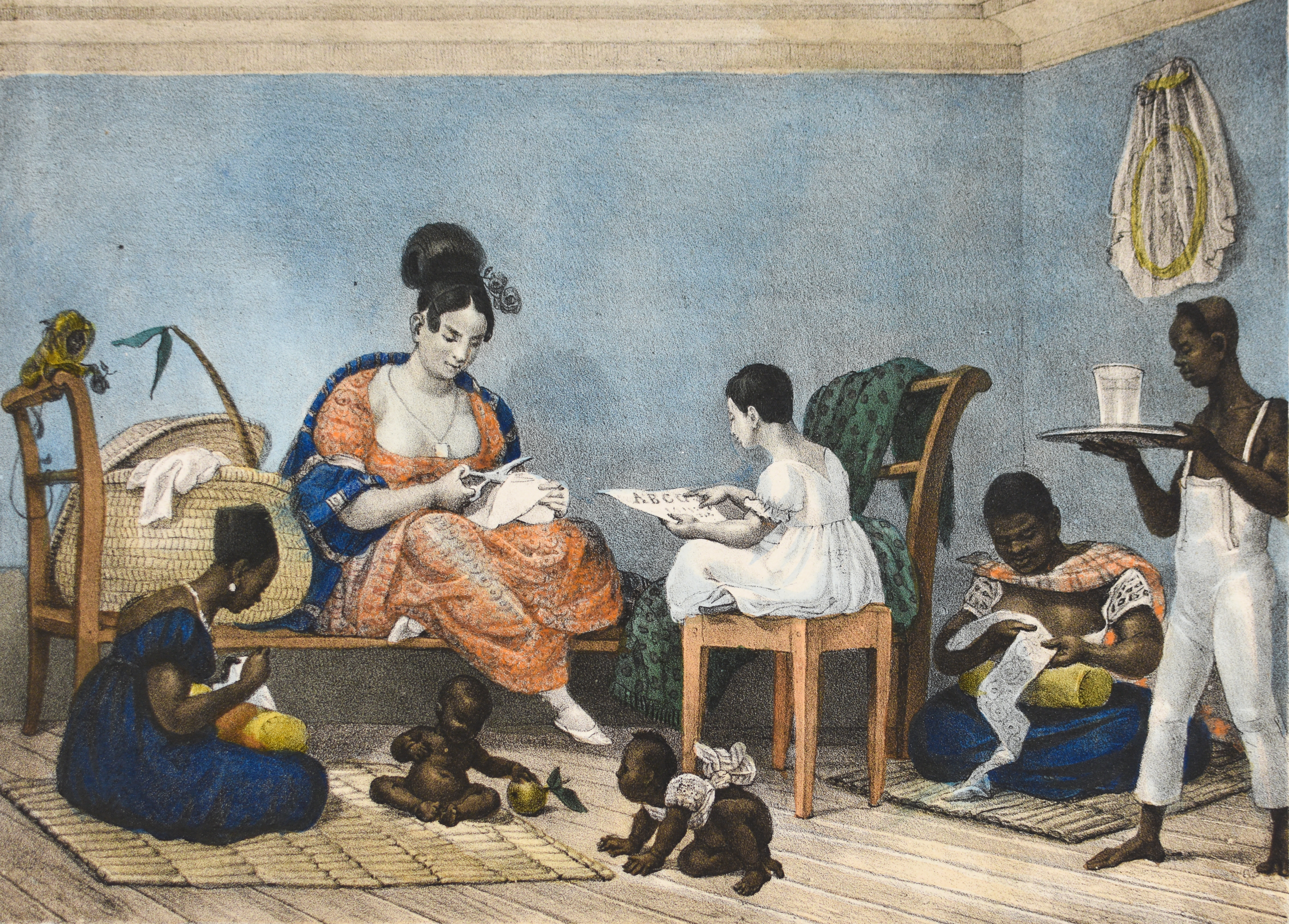
Depiction of Slavery in Brazil, before 1823

Slavery was greatly reduced around the world in the 19th century. Following a successful slave revolt in Haiti, Britain forced the Barbary pirates to halt their practice of kidnapping and enslaving Europeans, and passed the Slavery Abolition Act 1833 to ban slavery throughout its domain, and charged its navy with ending the global slave trade. Slavery was then abolished in Russia (1861), America (1865), and Brazil (1888).

=== African colonization ===
Following the abolition of the slave trade in 1807 and propelled by economic exploitation, the Scramble for Africa was initiated formally at the Berlin West Africa Conference in 1884–1885. The Berlin Conference attempted to avoid war among the European powers by allowing the European rival countries to carve up the continent of Africa into national colonies. Africans were not consulted.

The major European powers laid claim to the areas of Africa where they could exhibit a sphere of influence over the area. These claims did not have to have any substantial land holdings or treaties to be legitimate. The European power that demonstrated its control over a territory accepted the mandate to rule that region as a national colony. The European nation that held the claim developed and benefited from their colony's commercial interests without having to fear rival European competition. With the colonial claim came the underlying assumption that the European power that exerted control would use its mandate to offer protection and provide welfare for its colonial peoples, however, this principle remained more theory than practice. There were many documented instances of material and moral conditions deteriorating for native Africans in the late nineteenth and early twentieth centuries under European colonial rule, to the point where the colonial experience for them has been described as "hell on earth."

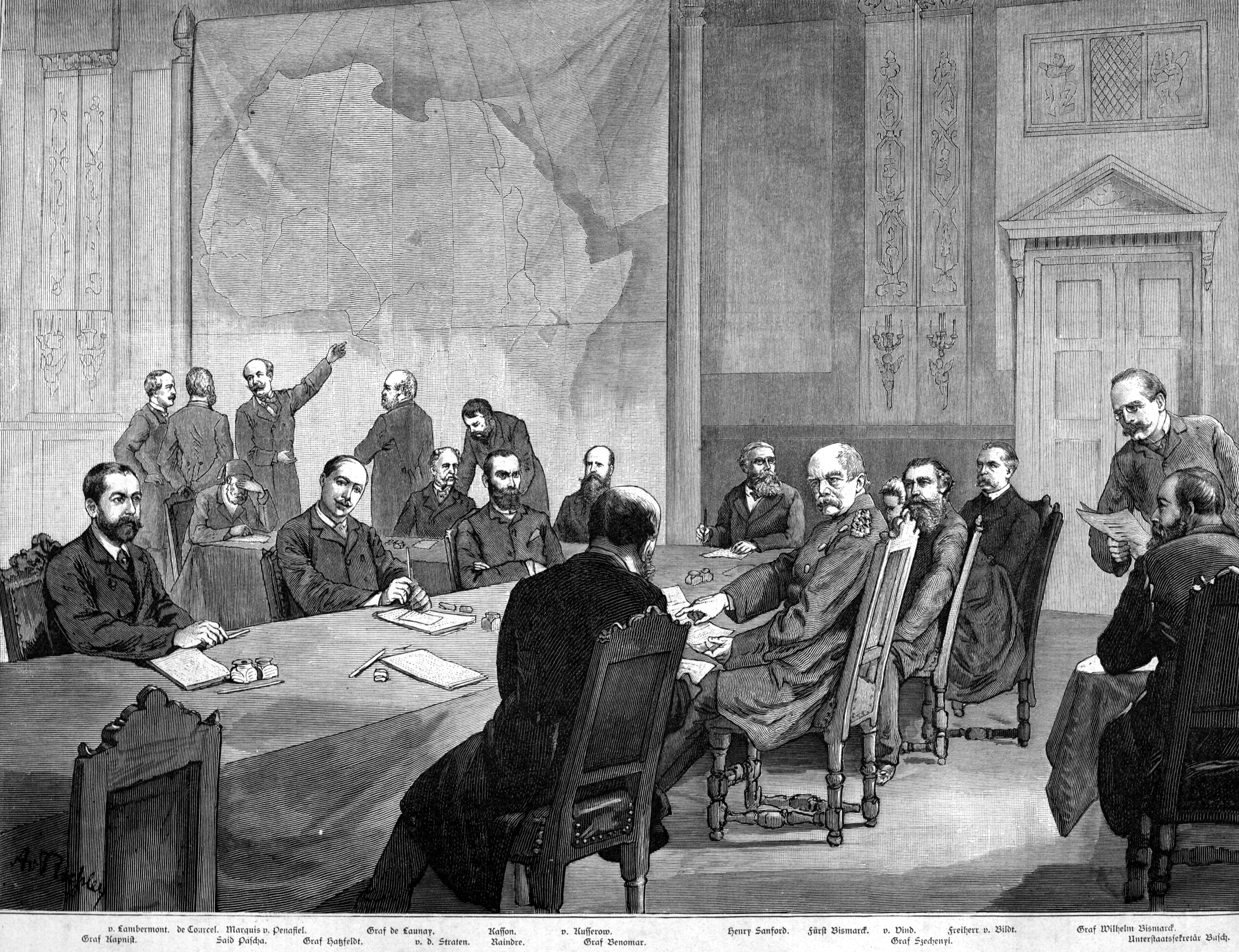
European officials staking claims to Africa in the Berlin Conference

At the time of the Berlin Conference, Africa contained one-fifth of the world's population living in one-quarter of the world's land area. However, from Europe's perspective, they were dividing an unknown continent. European countries established a few coastal colonies in Africa by the mid-nineteenth century, which included Cape Colony (Great Britain), Angola (Portugal), and Algeria (France), but until the late nineteenth century Europe largely traded with free African states without feeling the need for territorial possession. Until the 1880s most of Africa remained uncharted, with western maps from the period generally showing blank spaces for the continent's interior.

From the 1880s to 1914, the European powers expanded their control across the African continent, competing with each other for Africa's land and resources. Great Britain controlled various colonial holdings in East Africa that spanned the length of the African continent from Egypt in the north to South Africa. The French gained major ground in West Africa, and the Portuguese held colonies in southern Africa. Germany, Italy, and Spain established a small number of colonies at various points throughout the continent, which included German East Africa (Tanganyika) and German Southwest Africa for Germany, Eritrea and Libya for Italy, and the Canary Islands and Rio de Oro in northwestern Africa for Spain. Finally, for King Leopold (ruled from 1865 to 1909), there was the large "piece of that great African cake" known as the Congo, which became his personal fiefdom. By 1914, almost the entire continent was under European control. Liberia, which was settled by freed American slaves in the 1820s, and Abyssinia (Ethiopia) in eastern Africa were the last remaining independent African states.

=== Meiji Japan ===
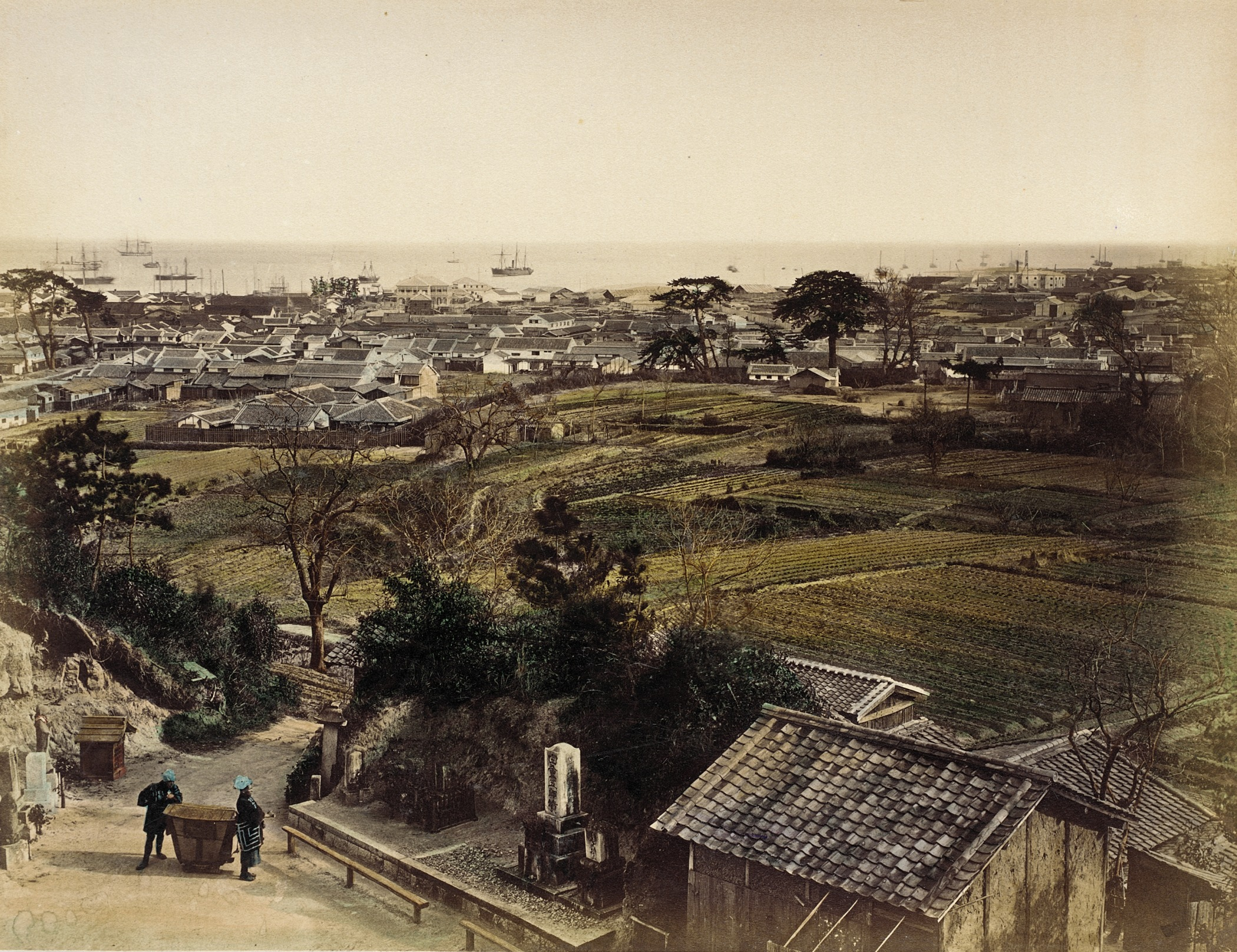
Kobe Japan and its harbor, 1865. Hand colored.

Around the end of the 19th century and into the 20th century, the Meiji era occurred during the reign of the Meiji Emperor. During this time, Japan started its modernization and rose to world power status. This era name means "Enlightened Rule". In Japan, the Meiji Restoration started in the 1860s, marking the rapid modernization by the Japanese themselves along European lines. Much research has focused on the issues of discontinuity versus continuity with the previous Tokugawa Period. It was not until the beginning of the Meiji Era that the Japanese government began taking modernization seriously. Japan expanded its military production base by opening arsenals in various locations. The hyobusho (war office) was replaced with a War Department and a Naval Department. The samurai class suffered great disappointment the following years.

Laws were instituted that required every able-bodied male Japanese citizen, regardless of class, to serve a mandatory term of three years with the first reserves and two additional years with the second reserves. This action, the deathblow for the samurai warriors and their daimyōs, initially met resistance from both the peasant and warrior alike. The peasant class interpreted the term for military service, ketsu-eki ("blood tax") literally, and attempted to avoid service by any means necessary. The Japanese government began modelling their ground forces after the French military. The French government contributed greatly to the training of Japanese officers. Many were employed at the military academy in Kyoto, and many more still were feverishly translating French field manuals for use in the Japanese ranks. Japan's modernized military gave Japan the opportunity to engage in Imperialism with its victory against the Qing Empire in the First Sino-Japanese War Japan annexed Taiwan, Korea and the Chinese province of Shandong.

After the death of the Meiji Emperor, the Taishō Emperor took the throne, the Taishō period was a time of democratic reform granting democratic rights to all Japanese men. Foreigners would be instrumental in aiding in Japan's modernization. A key foreign observer of the remarkable and rapid changes in Japanese society in this period was Ernest Mason Satow.

=== United States in the 19th century ===
==== Antebellum expansion ====
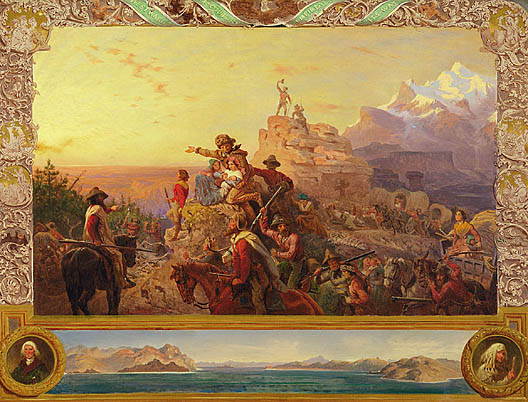
American westward expansion is idealized in Emanuel Leutze's famous painting Westward the Course of Empire Takes its Way (1861).

The Antebellum Age was a period of increasing division in the country based on the growth of slavery in the American South and in the western territories of Kansas and Nebraska that eventually led to the Civil War in 1861. The Antebellum Period is often considered to have begun with the Kansas–Nebraska Act of 1854, although it may have begun as early as 1812. This period is also significant because it marked the transition of American manufacturing to the industrial revolution.

"Manifest destiny" was the belief that the United States was destined to expand across the North American continent, from the Atlantic seaboard to the Pacific Ocean. During this time, the United States expanded to the Pacific Ocean—"from sea to shining sea"—largely defining the borders of the contiguous United States as they are today.

==== Civil War and Reconstruction ====
Modern recording of Gettysburg Address originally spoken by U.S. President Abraham Lincoln

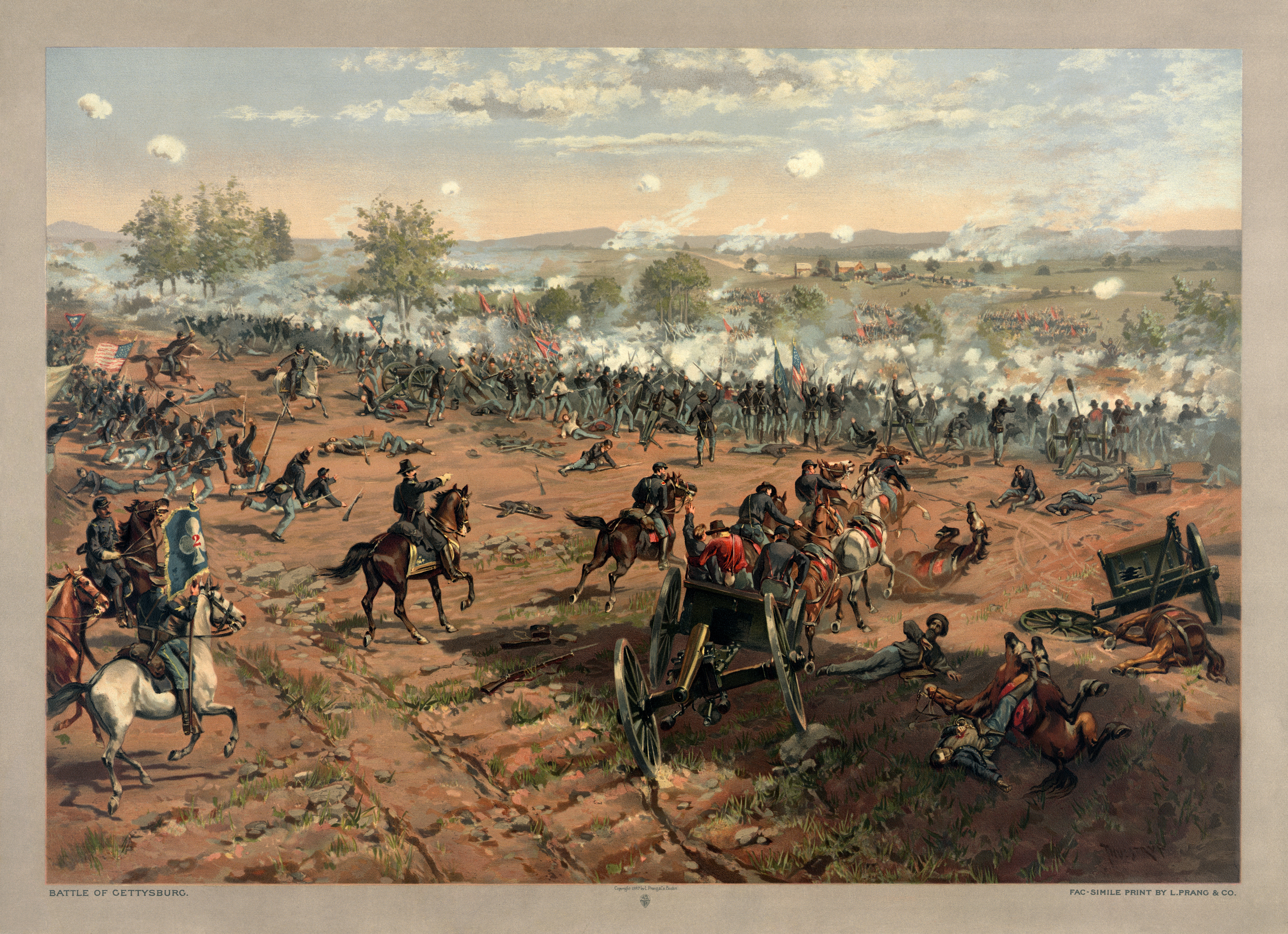
Battle of Gettysburg – Restoration by Adam Cuerden 0.5

The American Civil War began when seven Southern slave states declared their secession from the U.S. and formed the Confederate States of America, the Confederacy (four more states joined the Confederacy later). Led by Jefferson Davis, they fought against the U.S. federal government (the Union) under President Abraham Lincoln, which was supported by all the free states and the five border slave states in the north.

Northern leaders agreed that victory would require more than the end of fighting. Secession and Confederate nationalism had to be totally repudiated and all forms of slavery or quasi-slavery had to be eliminated. Lincoln proved effective in mobilizing support for the war goals, raising large armies and supplying them, avoiding foreign interference, and making the end of slavery a war goal. The Confederacy had a larger area than it could defend, and it failed to keep its ports open and its rivers clear as was the case in the Battle of Vicksburg. The North kept up the pressure as the South could barely feed and clothe its soldiers. Its soldiers, especially those in the East under the command of General Robert E. Lee proved highly resourceful until they finally were overwhelmed by Generals Ulysses S. Grant and William T. Sherman in 1864–65. The Reconstruction era (1863–77) began with the Emancipation Proclamation in 1863, and included freedom, full citizenship and voting rights for Southern blacks. It was followed by a reaction that left the blacks in a second class status legally, politically, socially and economically until the 1960s.

==== The Gilded Age and legacy ====
1902 New York City in early skyscrapers

During the Gilded Age, there was substantial growth in population in the United States and extravagant displays of wealth and excess of America's upper-class during the post-Civil War and post-Reconstruction era, in the late 19th century. The wealth polarization derived primarily from industrial and population expansion. The businessmen of the Second Industrial Revolution created industrial towns and cities in the Northeast with new factories, and contributed to the creation of an ethnically diverse industrial working class which produced the wealth owned by rising super-rich industrialists and financiers called the "robber barons". An example is the company of John D. Rockefeller, who was an important figure in shaping the new oil industry. Using highly effective tactics and aggressive practices, later widely criticized, Standard Oil absorbed or destroyed most of its competition.

The creation of a modern industrial economy took place. With the creation of a transportation and communication infrastructure, the corporation became the dominant form of business organization and a managerial revolution transformed business operations. In 1890, Congress passed the Sherman Antitrust Act—the source of all American anti-monopoly laws. The law forbade every contract, scheme, deal, or conspiracy to restrain trade, though the phrase "restraint of trade" remained subjective. By the beginning of the 20th century, per capita income and industrial production in the United States exceeded that of any other country except Britain. Long hours and hazardous working conditions led many workers to attempt to form labor unions despite strong opposition from industrialists and the courts. But the courts did protect the marketplace, declaring the Standard Oil group to be an "unreasonable" monopoly under the Sherman Antitrust Act in 1911. It ordered Standard to break up into 34 independent companies with different boards of directors.

=== Science and philosophy in the 19th century ===
An example of 19th century Classical Music Liszt- au bord d une, 1855

Charles Darwin's finches by Gould, 1882. Charles Darwin used the example of finches in the Galapagos Islands as evidence for the Theory of Evolution.

Replacing the classical physics in use since the end of the scientific revolution, modern physics arose in the early 20th century with the advent of quantum physics, substituting mathematical studies for experimental studies and examining equations to build a theoretical structure. (Note: The concepts derived are at times abstractions from nature for baselines or reference states. These can be unattainable in practice, such as free space (electromagnetism) and practical absolute zero temperature (ed. Special negative temperatures values are "colder" than the zero points of those scales but still warmer than absolute zero).) The old quantum theory was a collection of results which predate modern quantum mechanics, but were never complete or self-consistent. The collection of heuristic prescriptions for quantum mechanics were the first corrections to classical mechanics. (Note: Matrix mechanics and wave mechanics supplanted other studies to end the era of the old-quantum theory.) Outside the realm of quantum physics, the various aether theories in classical physics, which supposed a "fifth element" such as the Luminiferous aether, (Note: a substance in early physics considered to be the medium through which light propagates.) were nullified by the Michelson–Morley experiment—an attempt to detect the motion of earth through the aether. In biology, Darwinism gained acceptance, promoting the concept of adaptation in the theory of natural selection. The fields of geology, astronomy and psychology also made strides and gained new insights. In medicine, there were advances in medical theory and treatments.

Starting one-hundred years before the 20th century, the Enlightenment philosophy was challenged in various quarters around the 1900s. (Note: See also: Counter-Enlightenment, Max Weber, and Émile Durkheim.) Developed from earlier secular traditions, (Note: Known as continental philosophy.) modern Humanist ethical philosophies affirmed the dignity and worth of all people, based on the ability to determine right and wrong by appealing to universal human qualities, particularly rationality, without resorting to the supernatural or alleged divine authority from religious texts. For liberal humanists such as Rousseau and Kant, the universal law of reason guided the way toward total emancipation from any kind of tyranny. These ideas were challenged, for example by the young Karl Marx, who criticized the project of political emancipation (embodied in the form of human rights), asserting it to be symptomatic of the very dehumanization it was supposed to oppose. For Friedrich Nietzsche, humanism was nothing more than a secular version of theism. In his Genealogy of Morals, he argues that human rights exist as a means for the weak to collectively constrain the strong. On this view, such rights do not facilitate emancipation of life, but rather deny it. In the 20th century, the notion that human beings are rationally autonomous was challenged by the concept that humans were driven by unconscious irrational desires.

==== Notable persons ====
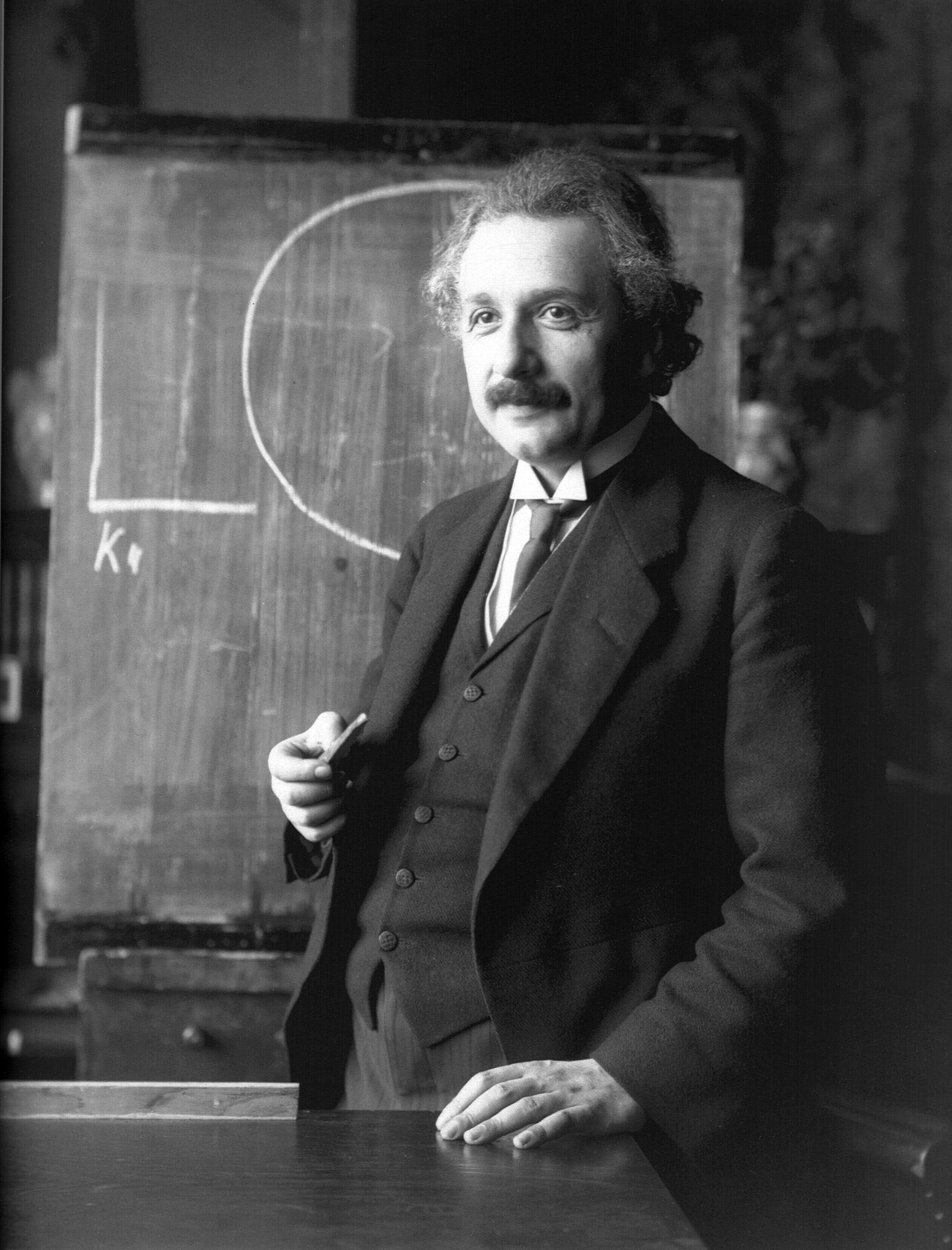
Albert Einstein in 1921

Sigmund Freud is renowned for his redefinition of sexual desire as the primary motivational energy of human life, as well as his therapeutic techniques, including the use of free association, his theory of transference in the therapeutic relationship, and the interpretation of dreams as sources of insight into unconscious desires.

Albert Einstein is known for his theories of special relativity and general relativity. He also made important contributions to statistical mechanics, especially his mathematical treatment of Brownian motion, his resolution of the paradox of specific heats, and his connection of fluctuations and dissipation. Despite his reservations about its interpretation, Einstein also made contributions to quantum mechanics and, indirectly, quantum field theory, primarily through his theoretical studies of the photon.

==== Social Darwinism ====
At the end of the 19th century, Social Darwinism was promoted and included the various ideologies based on a concept that competition among all individuals, groups, nations, or ideas was a "natural" framework for social evolution in human societies. In this view, society's advancement is dependent on the "survival of the fittest". The term was in fact coined by Herbert Spencer and referred to in "The Gospel of Wealth" written by Andrew Carnegie.

==== Marxist society ====
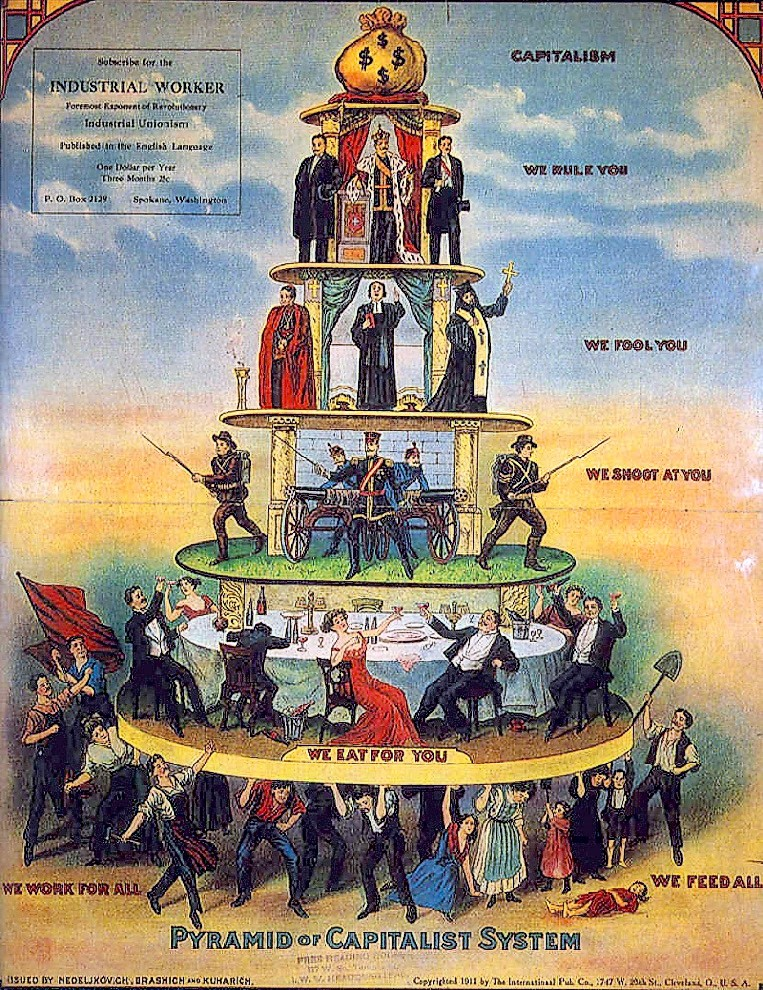
A 1911 Industrial Worker (IWW newspaper) publication advocating industrial unionism that shows a critique of capitalism.

Karl Marx summarized his approach to history and politics in the opening line of the first chapter of The Communist Manifesto (1848). He wrote:

The history of all hitherto existing society is the history of class struggles.

The Manifesto went through a number of editions from 1872 to 1890; notable new prefaces were written by Marx and Engels for the 1872 German edition, the 1882 Russian edition, the 1883 German edition, and the 1888 English edition. In general, Marxism identified five (and one transitional) successive stages of development in Western Europe.

1. Primitive communism: as seen in cooperative tribal societies.
2. Slavery: which develops when the tribe becomes a city-state. Aristocracy is born.
3. Feudalism: aristocracy is the ruling class. Merchants develop into capitalists.
4. Capitalism: capitalists are the ruling class, who create and employ the true working class.
5. Dictatorship of the proletariat: workers gain class consciousness, overthrow the capitalists and take control over the state.
6. Communism: a classless and stateless society.

== 20th century ==
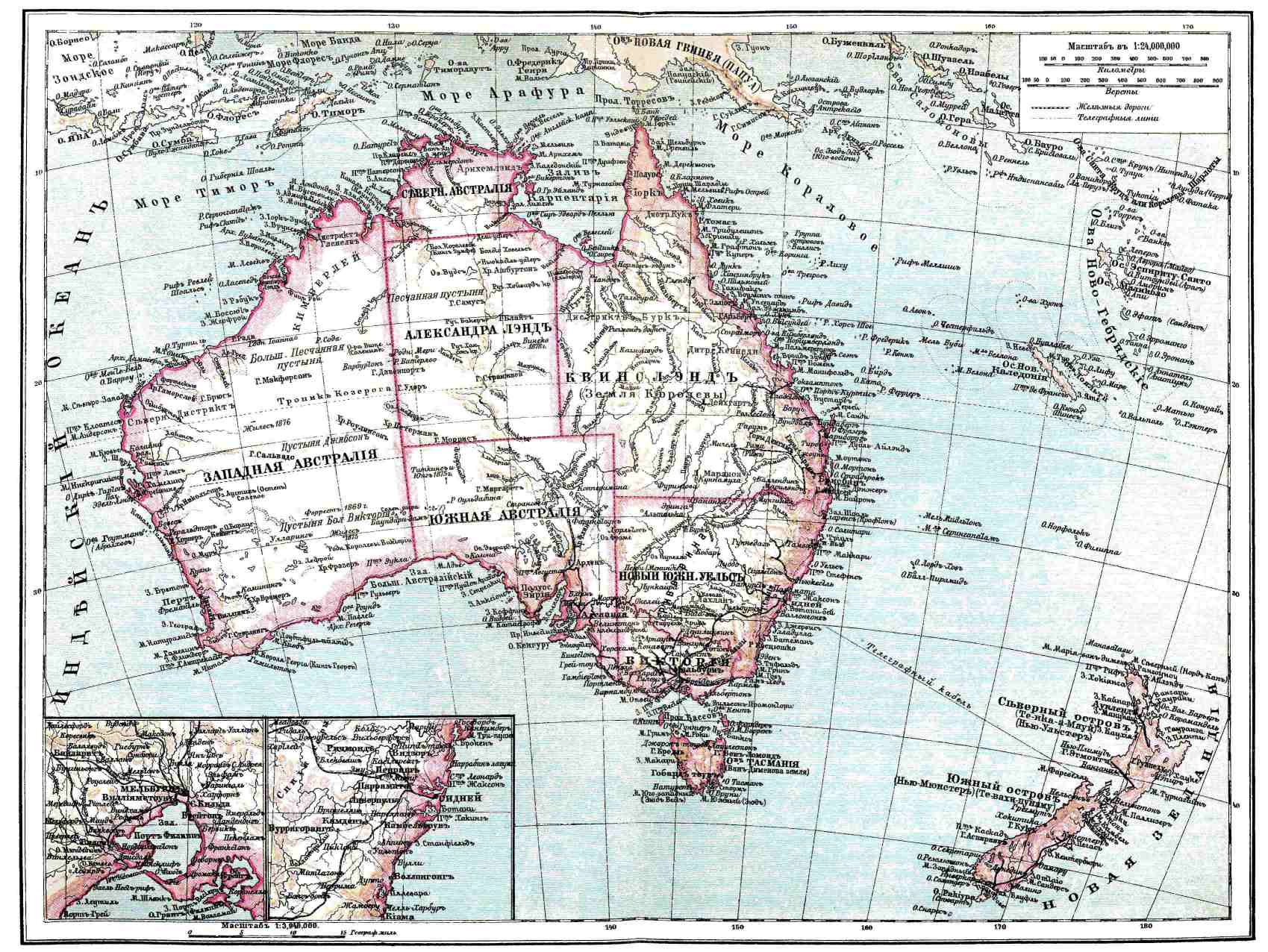
Though still tied to Great Britain in the commonwealth Australia achieved peaceful independence in 1901.

Major political developments saw the former British Empire lose most of its remaining political power over commonwealth countries. (Note: Most notably by dividing the British crown into several sovereignties by the Statute of Westminster, the patriation of constitutions by the Canada Act 1982 and the Australia Act 1986, and by the independence of countries such as India, Pakistan, South Africa, and Ireland.) The Trans-Siberian Railway, crossing Asia by train, was complete by 1916. Other events include the Israeli–Palestinian conflict, two world wars, and the Cold War.

=== Australian Constitution ===
In 1901, the Federation of Australia was the process by which the six separate British self-governing colonies of New South Wales, Queensland, South Australia, Tasmania, Victoria and Western Australia formed one nation. They kept the systems of government that they had developed as separate colonies but also would have a federal government that was responsible for matters concerning the whole nation. When the Constitution of Australia came into force, the colonies collectively became states of the Commonwealth of Australia.

=== Revolution and Warlords in China ===
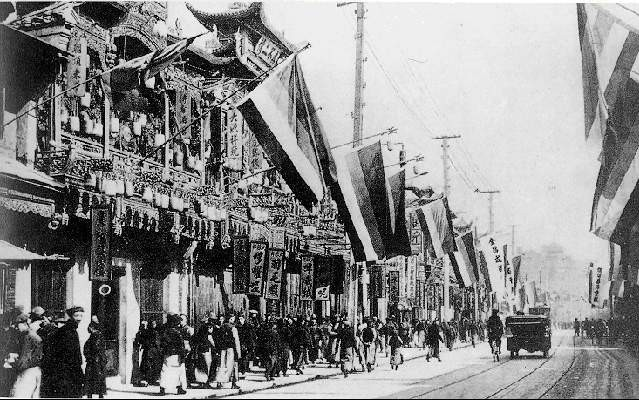
Xinhai Revolution in Shanghai; Chen Qimei organized Shanghainese civilians to start the uprising and was successful. The picture above is Nanjing Road after the uprising, hung with the Five Races Under One Union Flags then used by the revolutionaries.

The last days of the Qing dynasty were marked with civil unrest, failed reforms and foreign invasions such as the Boxer Rebellion. Responding to these civil failures and discontent, the Qing Imperial Court did attempt to reform the government in various ways, as the decision to draft a constitution in 1906, the establishment of provincial legislatures in 1909, and the preparation for a national parliament in 1910. However, many of these measures were opposed by the conservatives of the Qing Court, and many reformers were either imprisoned or executed outright. The failures of the Imperial Court to enact such reforming measures of political liberalization and modernization caused the reformists to steer toward the road of revolution.

The assertions of Chinese philosophy began to integrate concepts of Western philosophy, as steps toward modernization. By the time of the Xinhai Revolution in 1911, there were many calls, such as the May Fourth Movement, to completely abolish the old imperial institutions and practices of China. There were attempts to incorporate democracy, republicanism, and industrialism into Chinese philosophy, notably by Sun Yat-sen at the beginning of the 20th century.

In 1912, the Republic of China was established and Sun Yat-sen was inaugurated in Nanjing as the first Provisional President. But power in Beijing had already passed to Yuan Shikai, who had effective control of the Beiyang Army, the most powerful military force in China at the time. To prevent civil war and possible foreign intervention from undermining the infant republic, leaders agreed to the army's demand that China be united under a Beijing government. On March 10, in Beijing, Shikai was sworn in as the second Provisional President of the Republic of China.

After the early 20th century revolutions, shifting alliances of China's regional warlords waged war for control of the Beijing government. Despite the fact that various warlords gained control of the government in Beijing during the warlord era, this did not constitute a new era of control or governance, because other warlords did not acknowledge the transitory governments in this period and were a law unto themselves. These military-dominated governments were collectively known as the Beiyang government. The warlord era ended around 1927.

=== Early 20th century ===
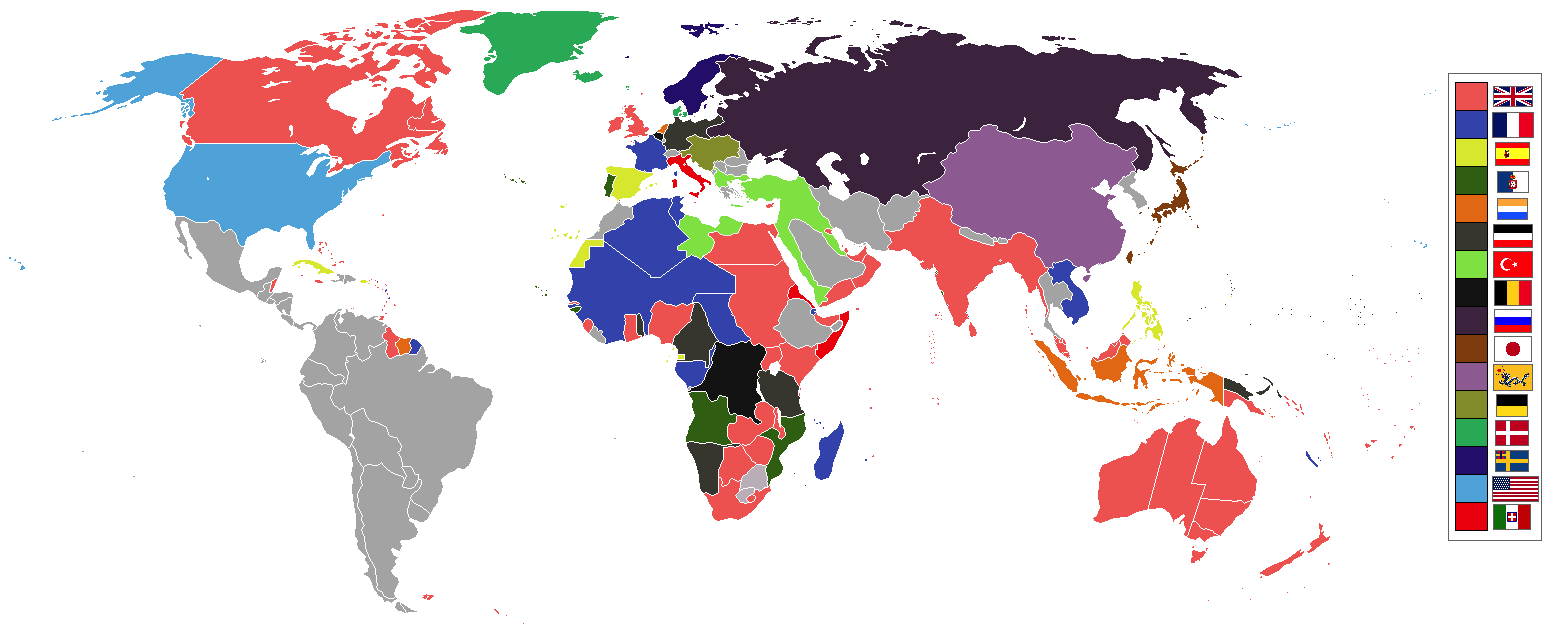
The World in 1898 color coded for major empires. The British Empire, the Russian Empire, the Qing dynasty and the United States were the largest countries at the time.

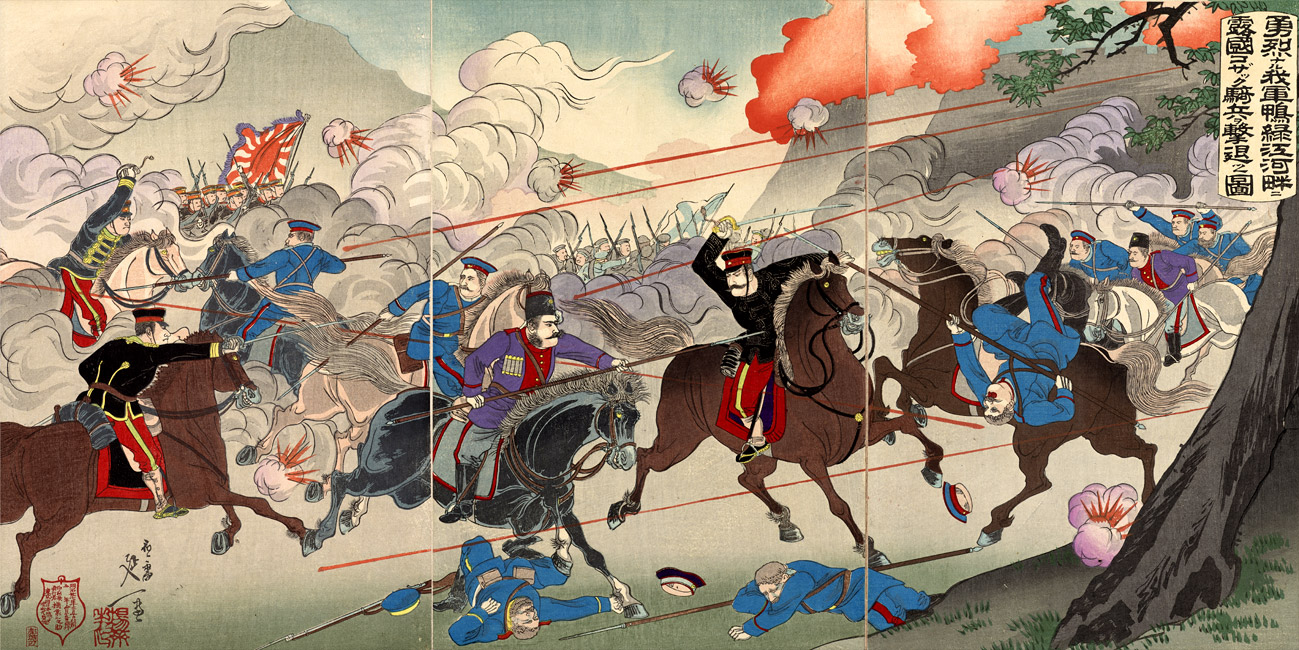
The Russo-Japanese War was the first time a European country was defeated by an Asian country in modern times. The Japanese victory shocked the world.

In 1900, the world's population had approached approximately 1.6 billion. Four years into the 20th century saw the Russo-Japanese War with the Battle of Port Arthur establishing the Empire of Japan as a world power. The Russians were in constant pursuit of a warm water port on the Pacific Ocean, for their navy as well as for maritime trade. The Manchurian Campaign of the Russian Empire was fought against the Japanese over Manchuria and Korea. The major theatres of operations were Southern Manchuria, specifically the area around the Liaodong Peninsula and Mukden, and the seas around Korea, Japan, and the Yellow Sea. The resulting campaigns, in which the fledgling Japanese military consistently attained victory over the Russian forces arrayed against them, were unexpected by world observers. These victories, as time transpired, would dramatically transform the distribution of power in East Asia, resulting in a reassessment of Japan's recent entry onto the world stage. The embarrassing string of defeats increased Russian popular dissatisfaction with the inefficient and corrupt Tsarist government.

The Russian Revolution of 1905 was a wave of mass political unrest through vast areas of the Russian Empire. Some of it was directed against the government, while some was undirected. It included terrorism, worker strikes, peasant unrests, and military mutinies. It led to the establishment of the limited constitutional monarchy, the establishment of State Duma of the Russian Empire, and the multi-party system.

In China, the Qing Dynasty was overthrown following the Xinhai Revolution. The Xinhai Revolution began with the Wuchang uprising on October 10, 1911, and ended with the abdication of Emperor Puyi on February 12, 1912. The primary parties to the conflict were the Imperial forces of the Qing dynasty (1644–1911), and the revolutionary forces of the Chinese Revolutionary Alliance (Tongmenghui).

=== Edwardian Britain ===
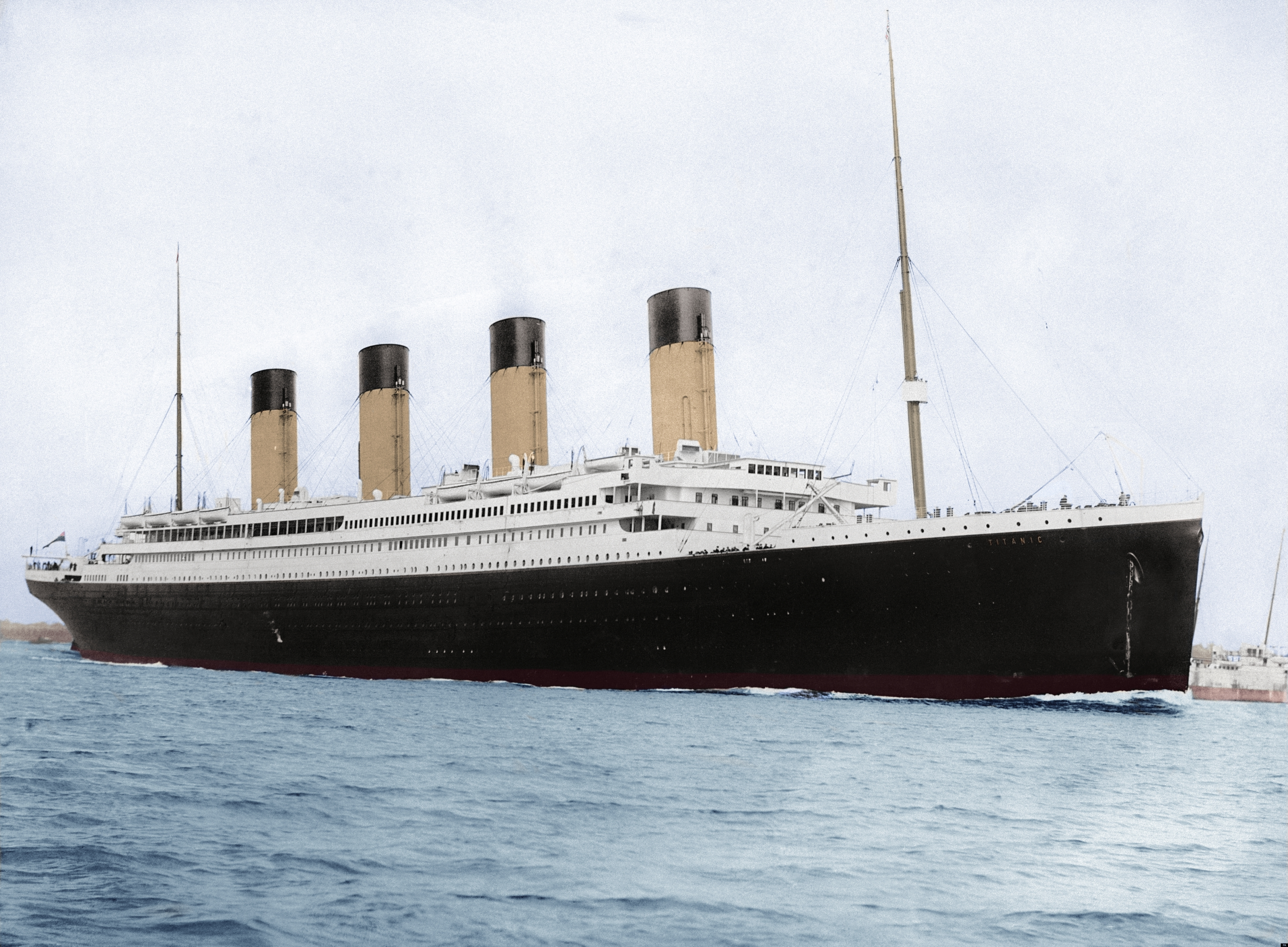
The Titanic was the largest ship constructed in her time. Deemed unsinkable, she was sunk by collision with an iceberg off the coast of Labrador, Canada.

The Edwardian era in the United Kingdom is the period spanning the reign of King Edward VII up to the end of the First World War, including the years surrounding the sinking of the RMS Titanic. In the early years of the period, the Second Boer War in South Africa split the country into anti- and pro-war factions. The imperial policies of the Conservatives eventually proved unpopular and in the general election of 1906 the Liberals won a huge landslide. The Liberal government was unable to proceed with all of its radical programme without the support of the House of Lords, which was largely Conservative. Conflict between the two Houses of Parliament over the People's Budget led to a reduction in the power of the peers in 1910. The general election in January that year returned a hung parliament with the balance of power held by Labour and Irish Nationalist members.

=== World War I ===
The causes of World War I included many factors, including the conflicts and antagonisms of the four decades leading up to the war. The Triple Entente was the name given to the loose alignment between the United Kingdom, France, and Russia after the signing of the Anglo-Russian Entente in 1907. The alignment of the three powers, supplemented by various agreements with Japan, the United States, and Spain, constituted a powerful counterweight to the Triple Alliance of Germany, Austria-Hungary, and Italy, the third having concluded an additional secret agreement with France effectively nullifying her Alliance commitments. Militarism, alliances, imperialism, and nationalism played major roles in the conflict. The immediate origins of the war lay in the decisions taken by statesmen and generals during the July Crisis of 1914, the spark (or casus belli) for which was the assassination of Archduke Franz Ferdinand of Austria.

However, the crisis did not exist in a void; it came after a long series of diplomatic clashes between the Great Powers over European and colonial issues in the decade prior to 1914 which had left tensions high. The diplomatic clashes can be traced to changes in the balance of power in Europe since 1870. An example is the Baghdad Railway which was planned to connect the Ottoman Empire cities of Konya and Baghdad with a line through modern-day Turkey, Syria and Iraq. The railway became a source of international disputes during the years immediately preceding World War I. Although it has been argued that they were resolved in 1914 before the war began, it has also been argued that the railroad was a cause of the First World War. Fundamentally the war was sparked by tensions over territory in the Balkans. Austria-Hungary competed with Serbia and Russia for territory and influence in the region and they pulled the rest of the great powers into the conflict through their various alliances and treaties. The Balkan Wars were two wars in South-eastern Europe in 1912–1913 in the course of which the Balkan League (Bulgaria, Montenegro, Greece, and Serbia) first captured Ottoman-held remaining part of Thessaly, Macedonia, Epirus, Albania and most of Thrace and then fell out over the division of the spoils, with incorporation of Romania this time.

Various periods of World War I; 1914.07.28 (Tsar Nicholas II of Russia orders a partial mobilization against Austria-Hungary), 1914.08.01 (Germany declares war on Russia), 1914.08.03 (Germany declares war on Russia's ally France), 1914.08.04 (Britain declares war on Germany), 1914.12 (British and German Christmas truce), 1915.12 (French and German Christmas truce), 1916.12 (Battle of Magdhaba), 1917.12 (British troops take Jerusalem from the Ottoman Empire), and 1918.11.11 (World War I ends: Germany signs an armistice agreement with the Allies). Allies and Central Powers in the First World War Allied powers and areas Central powers and colonies or occupied territory Neutral countries

The First World War began in 1914 and lasted to the final Armistice in 1918. The Allied Powers, led by the British Empire, France, Russia until March 1918, Japan and the United States after 1917, defeated the Central Powers, led by the German Empire, Austro-Hungarian Empire and the Ottoman Empire. The war caused the disintegration of four empires—the Austro-Hungarian, German, Ottoman, and Russian ones—as well as radical change in the European and West Asian maps. The Allied powers before 1917 are referred to as the Triple Entente, and the Central Powers are referred to as the Triple Alliance.

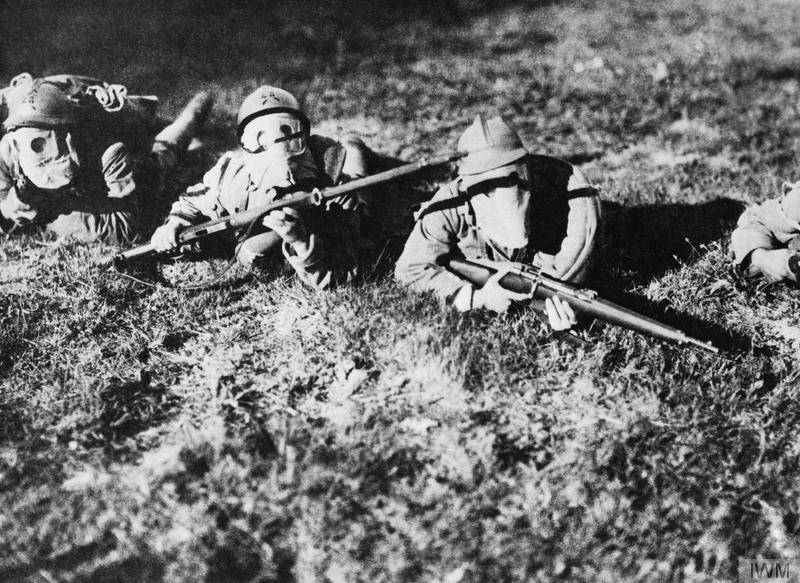
Italian Arditi troops using gas masks to protect themselves from chemical warfare, used for the first time in WWI.

Much of the fighting in World War I took place along the Western Front, within a system of opposing manned trenches and fortifications (separated by a "No man's land") running from the North Sea to the border of Switzerland. On the Eastern Front, the vast eastern plains and limited rail network prevented a trench warfare stalemate from developing, although the scale of the conflict was just as large. Hostilities also occurred on and under the sea and—for the first time—from the air. More than 9 million soldiers died on the various battlefields, and nearly that many more in the participating countries' home fronts on account of food shortages and genocide committed under the cover of various civil wars and internal conflicts. Notably, more people died of the worldwide influenza outbreak at the end of the war and shortly after than died in the hostilities. The unsanitary conditions engendered by the war, severe overcrowding in barracks, wartime propaganda interfering with public health warnings, and migration of so many soldiers around the world helped the outbreak become a pandemic.

Ultimately, World War I created a decisive break with the old world order that had emerged after the Napoleonic Wars, which was modified by the mid-19th century's nationalistic revolutions. The results of World War I would be important factors in the development of World War II approximately 20 years later. More immediate to the time, the partitioning of the Ottoman Empire was a political event that redrew the political boundaries of West Asia. The huge conglomeration of territories and peoples formerly ruled by the Sultan of the Ottoman Empire was divided into several new nations. The partitioning brought the creation of the modern Arab world and the Republic of Turkey. The League of Nations granted France mandates over Syria and Lebanon and granted the United Kingdom mandates over Mesopotamia and Palestine (which was later divided into two regions: Palestine and Transjordan). Parts of the Ottoman Empire on the Arabian Peninsula became parts of what are today Saudi Arabia and Yemen.

=== Revolution and war in Russia ===
Vladimir Lenin

The Russian Revolution is the series of revolutions in Russia in 1917, which destroyed the Tsarist autocracy and led to the creation of the Soviet Union. Following the abdication of Nicholas II of Russia, the Russian Provisional Government was established. In October 1917, a red faction revolution occurred in which the Red Guard, armed groups of workers and deserting soldiers directed by the Bolshevik Party, seized control of Saint Petersburg (then known as Petrograd) and began an immediate armed takeover of cities and villages throughout the former Russian Empire.

Another action in 1917 that is of note was the armistice signed between Russia and the Central Powers at Brest-Litovsk. As a condition for peace, the treaty by the Central Powers conceded huge portions of the former Russian Empire to Imperial Germany and the Ottoman Empire, greatly upsetting nationalists and conservatives. The Bolsheviks made peace with the German Empire and the Central Powers, as they had promised the Russian people prior to the Revolution. Vladimir Lenin's decision has been attributed to his sponsorship by the foreign office of Wilhelm II, German Emperor, offered by the latter in hopes that with a revolution, Russia would withdraw from World War I. This suspicion was bolstered by the German Foreign Ministry's sponsorship of Lenin's return to Petrograd (St. Petersburg). The Western Allies expressed their dismay at the Bolsheviks, upset at:

1. the withdrawal of Russia from the war effort,
2. worried about a possible Russo-German alliance, and
3. galvanized by the prospect of the Bolsheviks making good their threats to assume no responsibility for, and so default on, Imperial Russia's massive foreign loans. (Note: The legal notion of odious debt had not yet been formulated.)

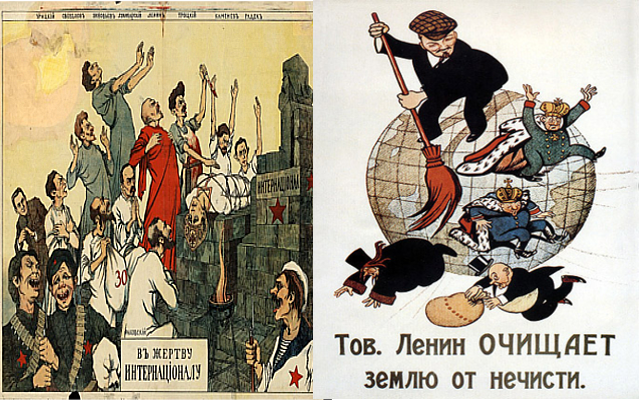
Two contrasting visions of the Russian Civil War. To the left is propaganda from the White Army, to the right is propaganda from the Bolsheviks.

In addition, there was a concern, shared by many Central Powers as well, that the socialist revolutionary ideas would spread to the West. Hence, many of these countries expressed their support for the Whites, including the provision of troops and supplies. Winston Churchill declared that Bolshevism must be "strangled in its cradle".

The Russian Civil War was a multi-party war that occurred within the former Russian Empire after the Russian provisional government collapsed and the Soviets under the domination of the Bolshevik party assumed power, first in Petrograd and then in other places. In the wake of the October Revolution, the old Russian Imperial Army had been demobilized; the volunteer-based Red Guard was the Bolsheviks' main military force, augmented by an armed military component of the Cheka, the Bolshevik state security apparatus. There was an instituted mandatory conscription of the rural peasantry into the Red Army. Opposition of rural Russians to Red Army conscription units was overcome by taking hostages and shooting them when necessary to force compliance. Former Tsarist officers were used as "military specialists" (voenspetsy), taking their families hostage to ensure loyalty. At the start of the war, three-fourths of the Red Army officer corps was composed of former Tsarist officers. By its end, 83% of all Red Army divisional and corps commanders were ex-Tsarist soldiers.

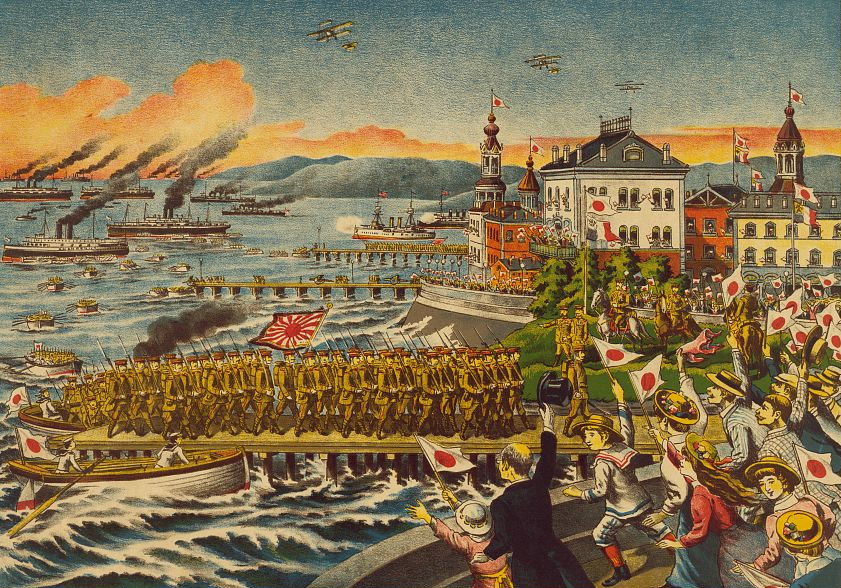
In the Russian Civil War, over eleven nations intervened in favor of the White Movement. Here Japanese occupy Vladivostok.

The principal fighting occurred between the Bolshevik Red Army and the forces of the White Army. Many foreign armies warred against the Red Army, notably the Allied Forces, yet many volunteer foreigners fought in both sides of the Russian Civil War. Other nationalist and regional political groups also participated in the war, including the Ukrainian nationalist Green Army, the Ukrainian anarchist Insurgent Army and Black Guards, and warlords such as Ungern von Sternberg. The most intense fighting took place from 1918 to 1920. Major military operations ended on October 25, 1922, when the Red Army occupied Vladivostok, previously held by the Provisional Priamur Government. The last enclave of the White Forces was the Ayano-Maysky District on the Pacific coast. The majority of the fighting ended in 1920 with the defeat of General Pyotr Wrangel in the Crimea, but a notable resistance in certain areas continued until 1923 (e.g., Kronstadt uprising, Tambov Rebellion, Basmachi Revolt, and the final resistance of the White movement in the Far East).

While the early 1920s was a time of flux for revolutionary Russia and Central Asia, the Union of Soviet Socialist Republics was proclaimed in 1922 as the successor state to the fallen Russian Empire. Revolutionary leader Vladimir Lenin died of natural causes and was succeeded by Joseph Stalin.

=== The early Republic of China ===
In 1917, China declared war on Germany in the hope of recovering its lost province, then under Japanese control. The New Culture Movement occupied the period from 1917 to 1923. Chinese representatives refused to sign the Treaty of Versailles, due to intense pressure from the student protesters and public opinion alike.

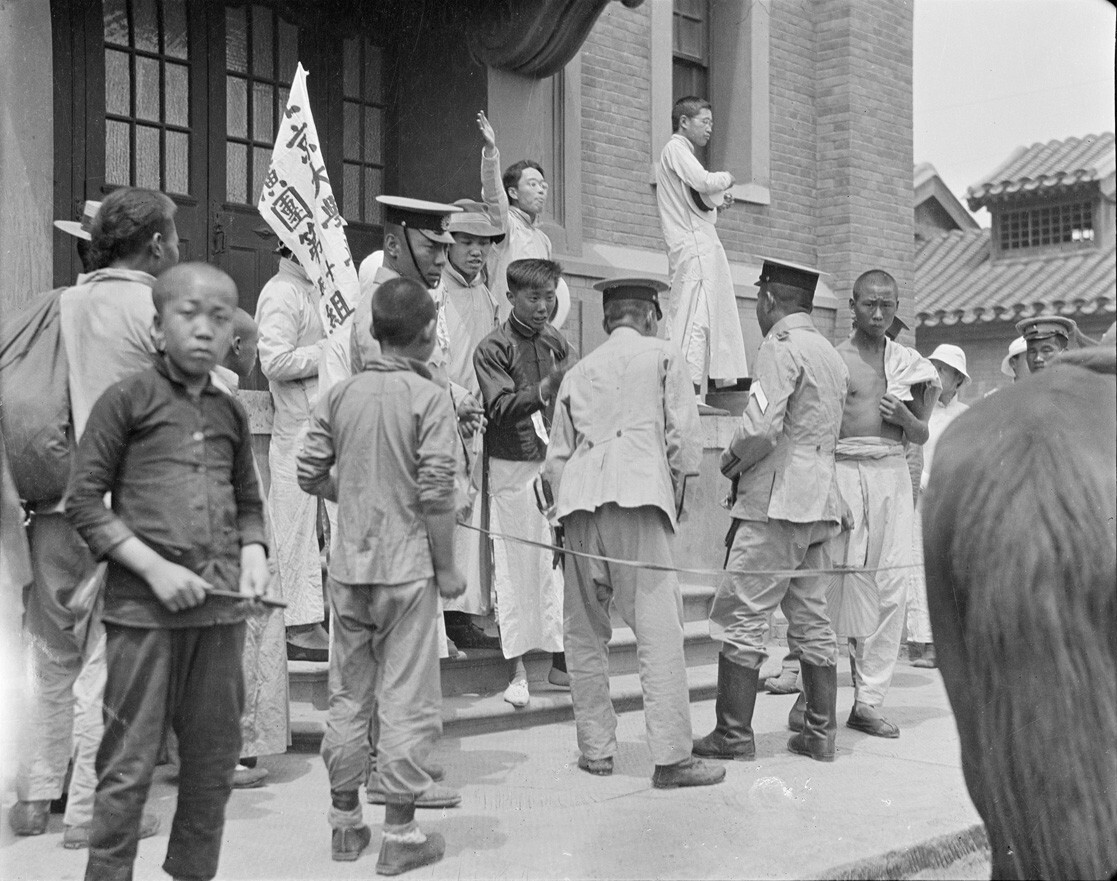
Student Demonstrations on June 3, 1919

The May Fourth Movement helped to rekindle the then-fading cause of republican revolution. In 1917 Sun Yat-sen had become commander-in-chief of a rival military government in Guangzhou in collaboration with southern warlords. Sun's efforts to obtain aid from the Western democracies were ignored, however, and in 1920 he turned to the Soviet Union, which had recently achieved its own revolution. The Soviets sought to befriend the Chinese revolutionists by offering scathing attacks on Western imperialism. But for political expediency, the Soviet leadership initiated a dual policy of support for both Sun and the newly established Chinese Communist Party (CCP).

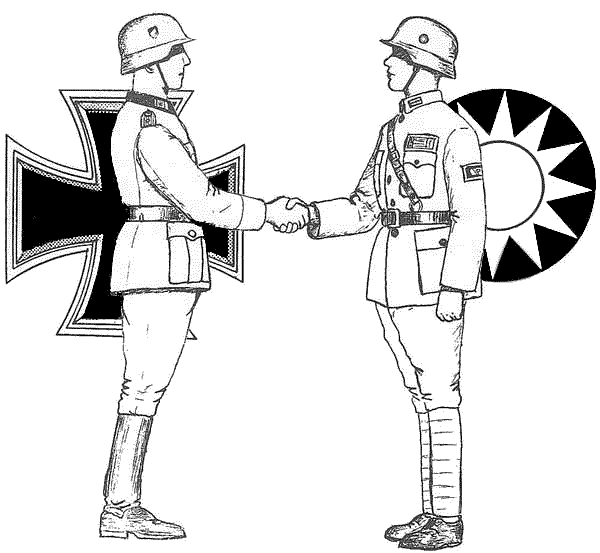
With Sino-German cooperation until 1941, Chinese industry and military was improved just prior to the war against Japan.

In early 1927, the Kuomintang-CCP rivalry led to a split in the revolutionary ranks. The CCP and the left wing of the Kuomintang had decided to move the seat of the Nationalist government from Guangzhou to Wuhan. But Chiang Kai-shek, whose Northern Expedition was proving successful, set his forces to destroying the Shanghai CCP apparatus and established an anti-Communist government at Nanjing in April 1927.

=== Nanjing period in China ===
The "Nanjing Decade" of 1928–37 was one of consolidation and accomplishment under the leadership of the Nationalists, with a mixed but generally positive record in the economy, social progress, development of democracy, and cultural creativity. Some of the harsh aspects of foreign concessions and privileges in China were moderated through diplomacy.

=== The 1920s and the Depression ===
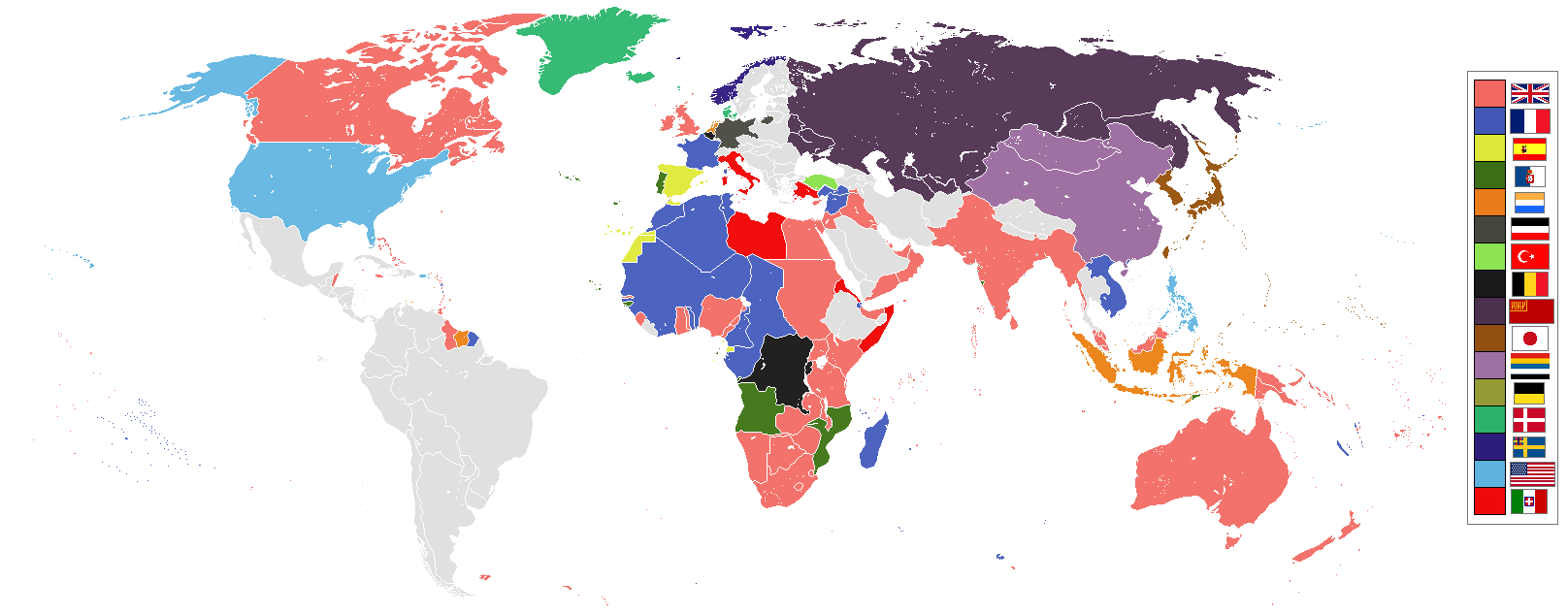
The world in 1920, part of the interwar period. Great Britain and France expanded greatly at the expense of the former German Empire

The interwar period was the period between the end of the First World War and the beginning of the Second World War. This period was marked by turmoil in much of the world, as Europe struggled to recover from the devastation of the First World War.

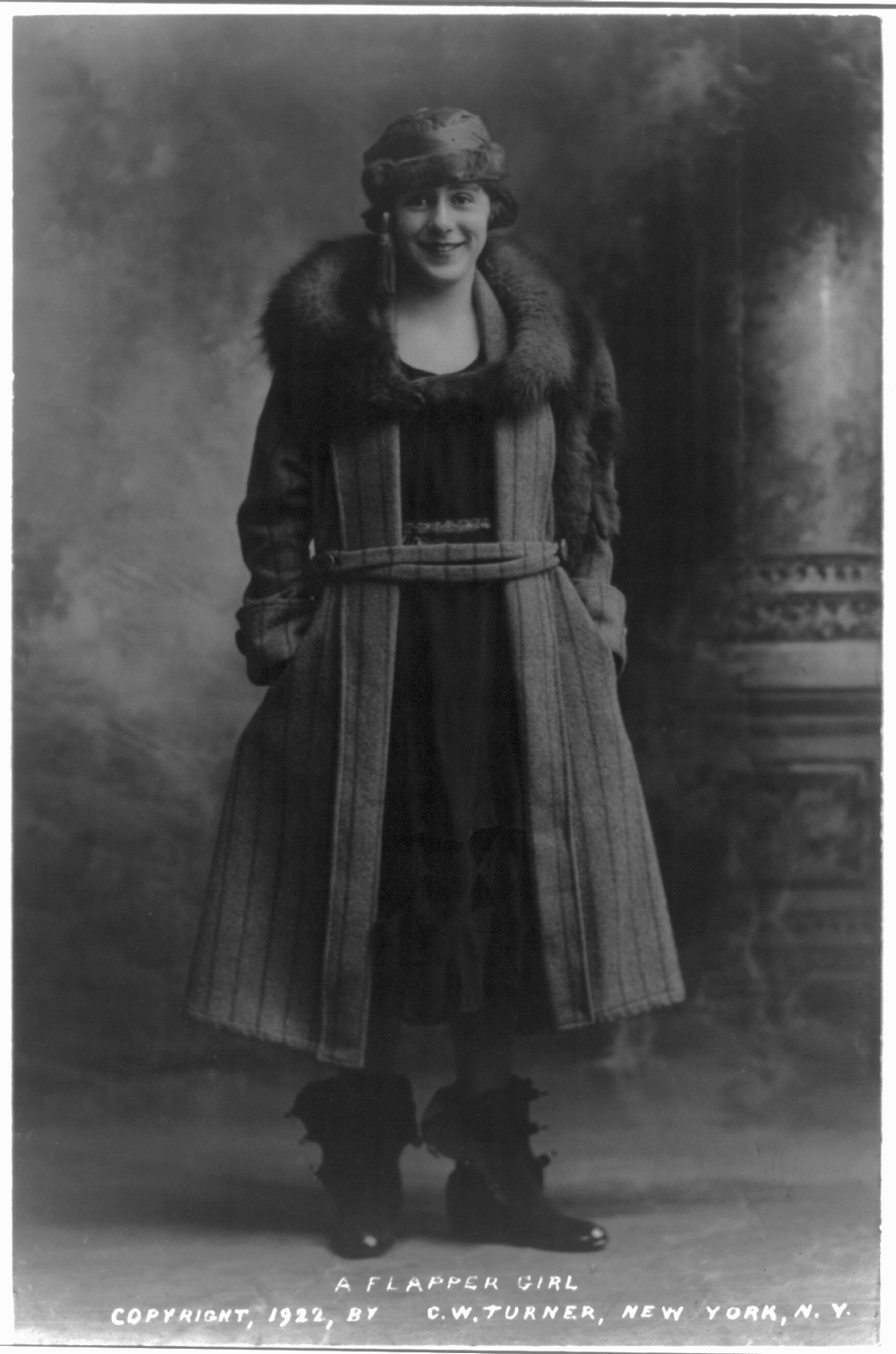
An American flapper girl. In the 1920s, women experienced a degree of liberation.

In North America, especially the first half of this period, people experienced considerable prosperity in the Roaring Twenties. The social and societal upheaval known as the Roaring Twenties began in North America and spread to Europe in the aftermath of World War I. The Roaring Twenties, often called the "Jazz Age", saw an exposition of social, artistic, and cultural dynamism. "Normalcy" returned to politics, jazz music blossomed, the flapper redefined modern womanhood, Art Deco peaked. The spirit of the Roaring Twenties was marked by a general feeling of discontinuity associated with modernity, a break with traditions. Everything seemed to be feasible through modern technology. New technologies, especially automobiles, movies and radio proliferated "modernity" to a large part of the population. The 1920s saw the general favor of practicality, in architecture as well as in daily life. The 1920s was further distinguished by several inventions and discoveries, extensive industrial growth and the rise in consumer demand and aspirations, and significant changes in lifestyle.

I got the Ritz from the one I love, Jazz music radio broadcast 1932

Europe spent these years rebuilding and coming to terms with the vast human cost of the conflict. The occupation of Constantinople and Smyrna in the Ottoman Empire by the Allies in the aftermath of World War I prompted the establishment of the Turkish National Movement. The Turkish War of Independence (1919–1923) was waged with the aim of revoking the terms of the Treaty of Sèvres. After the Turkish victory, the Treaty of Lausanne of July 24, 1923, led to the international recognition of the sovereignty of the newly formed "Republic of Turkey" as the successor state of the Ottoman Empire, and the republic was officially proclaimed on October 29, 1923, in Ankara, the country's new capital. The Lausanne Convention stipulated a population exchange between Greece and Turkey, whereby 1.1 million Greeks left Turkey for Greece in exchange for 380,000 Muslims transferred from Greece to Turkey. The economy of the United States became increasingly intertwined with that of Europe. In Germany, the Weimar Republic gave way to episodes of political and economic turmoil, which culminated with the German hyperinflation of 1923 and the failed Beer Hall Putsch of that same year. When Germany could no longer afford war payments, Wall Street invested heavily in European debts to keep the European economy afloat as a large consumer market for American mass-produced goods. By the middle of the decade, economic development soared in Europe, and the Roaring Twenties broke out in Germany, Britain and France, the second half of the decade becoming known as the "Golden Twenties". In France and francophone Canada, they were also called the "années folles" ("Crazy Years").

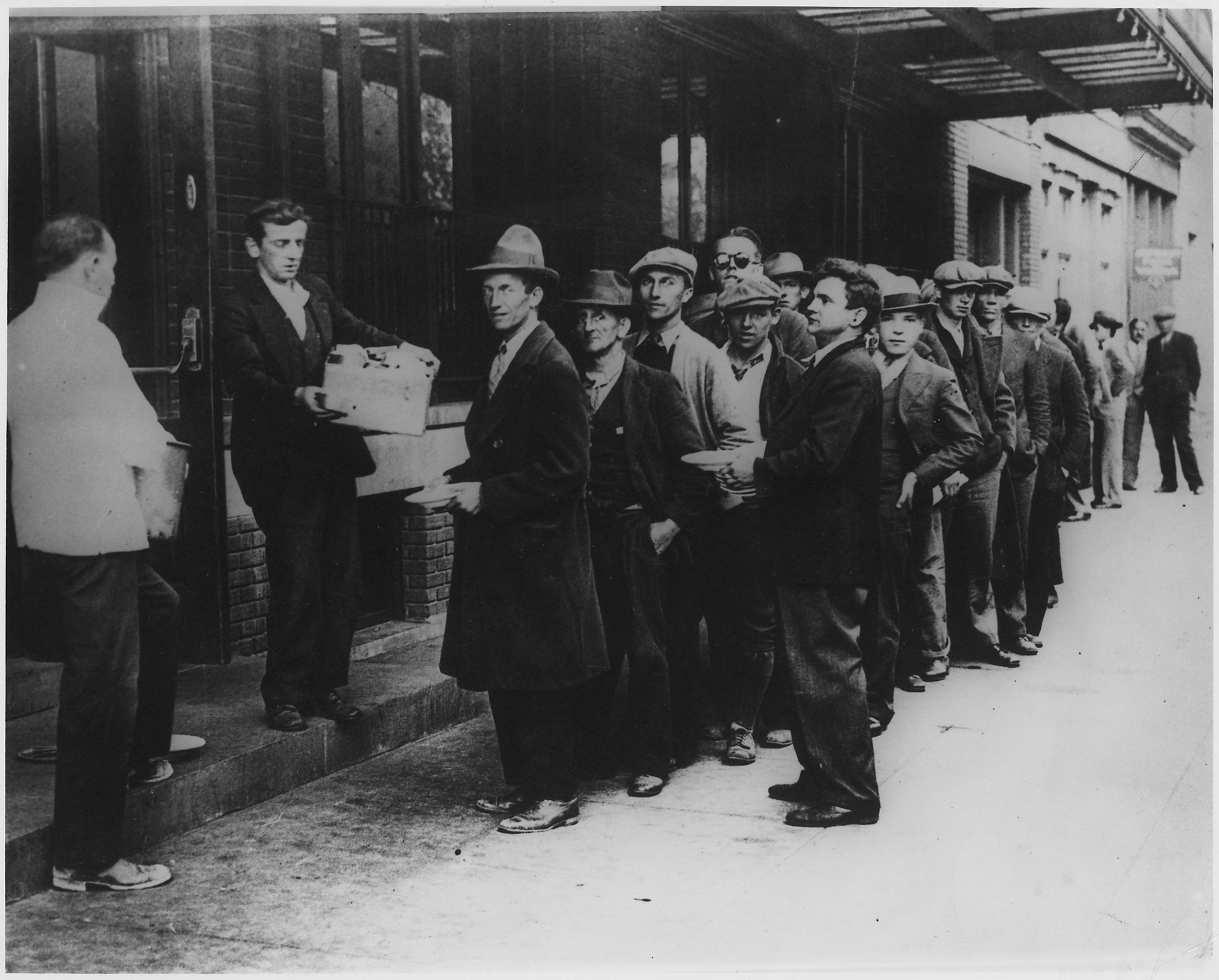
Great Depression, Breadlines-long line of people waiting to be fed, New York City, United States

Worldwide prosperity changed dramatically with the onset of the Great Depression in 1929. The Wall Street Crash of 1929 served to punctuate the end of the previous era, as The Great Depression set in. The Great Depression was a worldwide economic downturn starting in most places in 1929 and ending at different times in the 1930s or early 1940s for different countries. It was the largest and most important economic depression in the 20th century, and is used in the 21st century as an example of how far the world's economy can fall.

The Great Depression had devastating effects in virtually every country, rich or poor. International trade plunged by half to two-thirds, as did personal income, tax revenue, prices and profits. Cities all around the world were hit hard, especially those dependent on heavy industry. Construction was virtually halted in many countries. Farming and rural areas suffered as crop prices fell by roughly 60 percent. Facing plummeting demand with few alternate sources of jobs, areas dependent on primary sector industries suffered the most. The Great Depression ended at different times in different countries with the effect lasting into the next era. America's Great Depression ended in 1941 with America's entry into World War II. The majority of countries set up relief programs, and most underwent some sort of political upheaval, pushing them to the left or right. In some world states, the desperate citizens turned toward nationalist demagogues—the most infamous being Adolf Hitler—setting the stage for the next era of war. The convulsion brought on by the worldwide depression resulted in the rise of Nazism. In Asia, Japan became an ever more assertive power, especially with regards to China.

=== The League and crises ===
UK Prime Minister Neville Chamberlain attempted to negotiate with Adolf Hitler as Nazi Germany practiced an expansionist policy.

The interwar period was also marked by a radical change in the international order, away from the balance of power that had dominated pre–World War I Europe. One main institution that was meant to bring stability was the League of Nations, which was created after the First World War with the intention of maintaining world security and peace and encouraging economic growth between member countries.

However the League failed to resolve any major crises and by 1938 it was no longer a major player. The League was undermined by the bellicosity of Nazi Germany, Imperial Japan, the Soviet Union, and Mussolini's Italy, and by the non-participation of the United States.

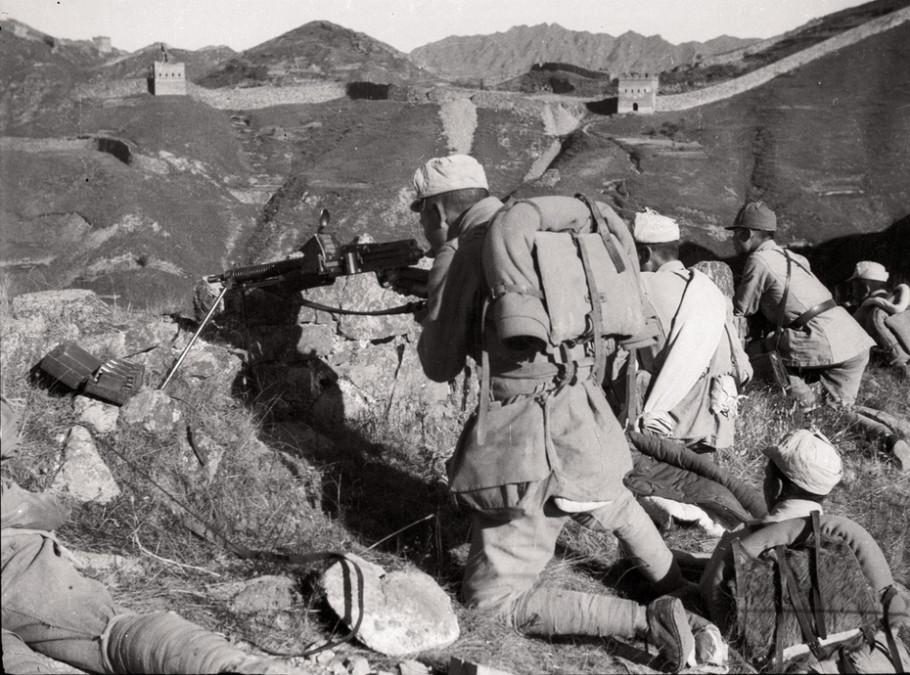
Nationalist Chinese soldiers defending at the Battle at Great Wall, Laiyuan, Hebei, China autumn 1937. The Second Sino-Japanese War cost at least twenty millions lives.

A series of international crises strained the League to its limits, the earliest being the invasion of Manchuria by Japan and the Abyssinia Crisis of 1935–1936 in which Italy invaded Abyssinia, one of the only free African nations at that time.

The League tried to enforce economic sanctions upon Italy, but to no avail. The incident highlighted French and British weakness, exemplified by their reluctance to alienate Italy and lose her as their ally. The limited actions taken by the Western powers pushed Mussolini's Italy towards alliance with Hitler's Germany anyway. The Abyssinian war showed Hitler how weak the League was and encouraged the remilitarization of the Rhineland in flagrant disregard of the Treaty of Versailles. This was the first in a series of provocative acts culminating in the invasion of Poland in September 1939 and the beginning of the Second World War.

=== Tripartite Pact, World War II, and contemporary history (post-1945) ===
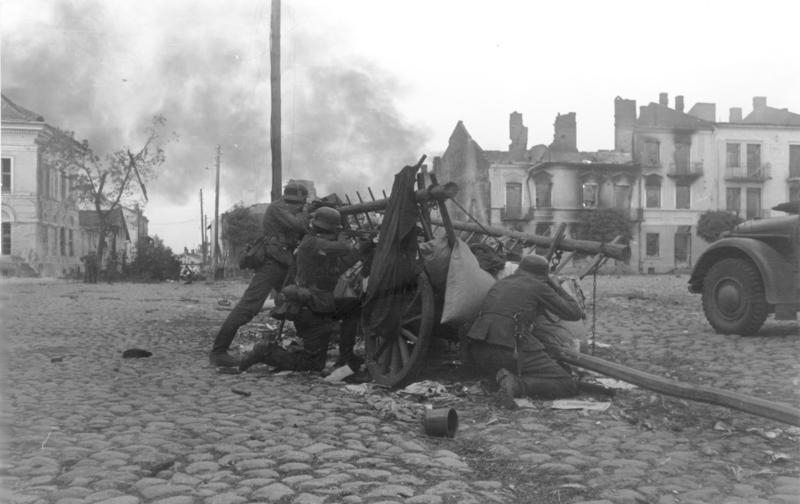
The German Invasion of Poland in 1939 is the official start of World War II.

Facing resource scarcity due to a growing population, Japan seized Manchuria in September 1931 and put ex-Qing emperor Puyi in charge as head of the puppet state of Manchukuo in 1932. During the Sino-Japanese War (1937–1945), the loss of Manchuria, and its vast potential for military-industrial development, was a blow to the Chinese economy. After 1940, conflicts between the Kuomintang and Communists became more frequent in the areas not under Japanese control. The Communists expanded their influence wherever opportunities presented themselves through mass organizations, administrative reforms, and the land- and tax-reform measures favoring the peasants—while the Kuomintang attempted to neutralize the spread of Communist influence. The Second Sino-Japanese War had seen tensions rise between Imperial Japan and the United States; events such as the Panay incident and the Nanjing massacre turned American public opinion against Japan. With the occupation of French Indochina in the years of 1940–1941, and with the continuing war in China, the United States placed a metal and oil embargo on Japan which were vital to its war effort. The Japanese were faced with the option of either withdrawing from China or seizing and securing new sources of raw materials in the resource-rich, European-controlled colonies of Southeast Asia—specifically British Malaya and the Dutch East Indies (modern-day Indonesia).

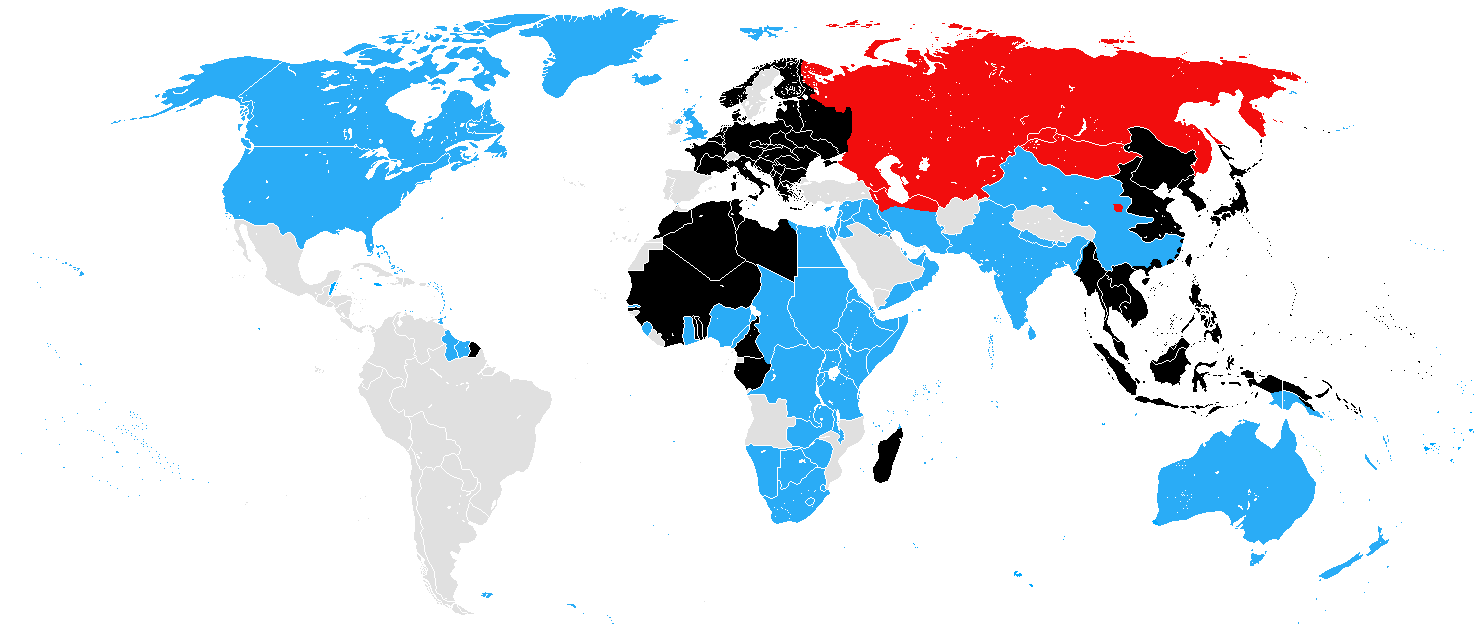
World War II at the height of Axis expansion (black) fighting against the Allies (blue) and Comintern (red). The Empire of Japan was not at war with the Soviet Union despite being part of the Tripartite Pact.

Although Japan had invaded China in 1937, the conventional view is that the World War II began on September 1, 1939, when Nazi Germany invaded Poland. Within two days the United Kingdom and France declared war on Germany, even though the fighting was confined to Poland. Pursuant to a then-secret provision of its non-aggression Molotov–Ribbentrop Pact, the Soviet Union joined Germany on September 17, 1939, to conquer Poland and divide Eastern Europe. The Allies were initially made up of Poland, the United Kingdom, France, Australia, Canada, New Zealand, South Africa, as well as British Commonwealth countries which were controlled directly by the UK, such as the Indian Empire. All of these countries declared war on Germany in September 1939.

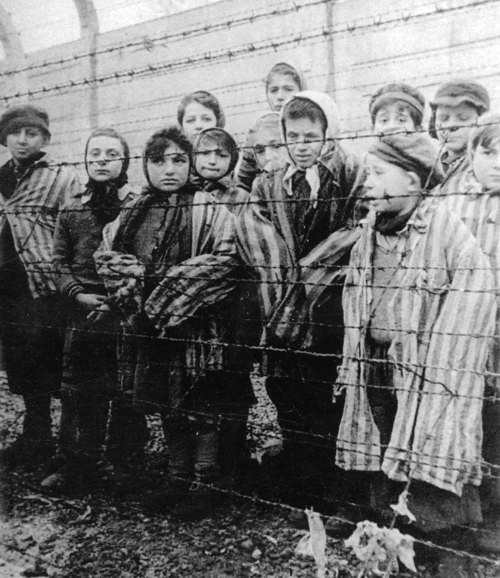
Survivors of the Holocaust at the infamous German concentration camp of Auschwitz located in occupied Poland.

Following the lull in fighting, known as the "Phoney War", Germany invaded western Europe in May 1940. Six weeks later, France, in the meantime, attacked by Italy as well, surrendered to Germany, which then tried unsuccessfully to conquer Britain. On September 27, Germany, Italy, and Japan signed a mutual defense agreement, the Tripartite Pact, and were known as the Axis Powers. Nine months later, on June 22, 1941, Germany launched a massive invasion of the Soviet Union, which prompt it to join the Allies. Germany was now engaged in fighting a war on two fronts. This proved to be a mistake – Germany had not successfully carried out the invasion of Britain and the war turned against the Axis.

On December 7, 1941, Japan attacked the United States at Pearl Harbor, bringing it too into the war on the side of the Allies. China also joined the Allies, as did most of the rest of the world. China was in turmoil at the time, and attacked Japanese armies through guerilla-type warfare. By the beginning of 1942, the alignment of the major combatants were as follows: the British Commonwealth, the Soviet Union and the United States were fighting Germany and Italy; China, the British Commonwealth, and the United States were fighting Japan. The United Kingdom, the United States, the Soviet Union and China were referred as a "trusteeship of the powerful" during the World War II and were recognized as the Allied "Big Four" in Declaration by United Nations These four countries were considered as the "Four Policemen" or "Four Sheriffs" of the Allies power and primary victors of World War II. Battles raged across all of Europe, in the North Atlantic Ocean, across North Africa, throughout Southeast Asia, throughout China, across the Pacific Ocean and in the air over Japan. Italy surrendered in September 1943 and was split into a northern Germany-occupied puppet state and an Allies-friendly state in the South; Germany surrendered in May 1945. Following the atomic bombings of Hiroshima and Nagasaki, Japan surrendered, marking the end of the war on September 2, 1945.

U.S President Franklin Roosevelt declaring war on the Japanese Empire in the aftermath of the Pearl Harbor Attack.

Excerpt of U.S. President Harry Truman's speech regarding the nuclear attack on Hiroshima, Japan.

It is possible that around 62 million people died in the war; estimates vary greatly. About 60% of all casualties were civilians, who died as a result of disease, starvation, genocide (in particular, the Holocaust), and aerial bombings. The Soviet Union and China suffered the most casualties. Estimates place deaths in the Soviet Union at around 23 million, while China suffered about 10 million. No country lost a greater portion of its population than Poland: approximately 5.6 million, or 16%, of its pre-war population of 34.8 million died. The Holocaust (which roughly means "burnt whole") was the deliberate and systematic murder of millions of Jews and other "unwanted" during World War II by the Nazi regime in Germany. Several differing views exist regarding whether it was intended to occur from the war's beginning, or if the plans for it came about later. Regardless, persecution of Jews extended well before the war even started, such as in the Kristallnacht (Night of Broken Glass). The Nazis used propaganda to great effect to stir up anti-Semitic feelings within ordinary Germans.

Over the course of the 20th century, the world's per-capita gross domestic product grew by a factor of five, much more than all earlier centuries combined (including the 19th with its Industrial Revolution). Many economists made the case that this understated the magnitude of growth, as many of the goods and services consumed at the end of the 20th century, such as improved medicine (causing world life expectancy to increase by more than two decades) and communications technologies, were not available at any price at its inception. However, the gulf between the world's rich and poor grew wider, and the majority of the global population remained in the poor side of the divide.

=== Latin America polarization ===
In Latin America in the 1970s, leftists acquired a significant political influence which prompted the right-wing, ecclesiastical authorities and a large portion of the individual country's upper class to support coups d'état to avoid what they perceived as a communist threat. This was further fueled by Cuban and United States intervention which led to a political polarization. Most South American countries were in some periods ruled by military dictatorships that were supported by the United States of America. In the 1970s, the regimes of the Southern Cone collaborated in Operation Condor killing many leftist dissidents, including some urban guerrillas.

=== Information Age ===
The Information Age began in the mid-20th century, characterized by a rapid epochal shift from the traditional industry established by the Industrial Revolution to an economy primarily based upon information technology. The onset of the Information Age can be associated with the development of transistor technology, particularly the MOSFET (metal-oxide-semiconductor field-effect transistor), which became the fundamental building block of digital electronics and revolutionized modern technology.

According to the United Nations Public Administration Network, the Information Age was formed by capitalizing on computer microminiaturization advances, which, upon broader usage within society, would lead to modernized information and to communication processes becoming the driving force of social evolution.
